= 1745 in poetry =

| List of years in poetry | (table) |
- … 1735; 1736; 1737; 1738; 1739; 1740; 1741; 1742; 1743; 1744; 1745; 1746; 1747; 1748; 1749; 1750; 1751; 1752; 1753; 1754; 1755 …
- In literature 1742 1743 1744 1745 1746 1747 1748
- Art; Archaeology; Architecture; Literature; Music; Philosophy; Science; +...

Nationality words link to articles with information on the nation's poetry or literature (for instance, Irish or France).

== Events ==
- October 19 – Jonathan Swift, Irish satirist and Dean of St Patrick's Cathedral, Dublin, dies aged 78. His body is laid out in public for the people of Dublin to pay their last respects, and he is buried, in accordance with his wishes, in his cathedral by Esther Johnson's side, with his own epitaph: Ubi sæva Indignatio/Ulterius/Cor lacerare nequit ("Where savage indignation can no longer lacerate the heart"). His death marks the end of the Scriblerus Club and the effective end of the age of Augustan poetry.

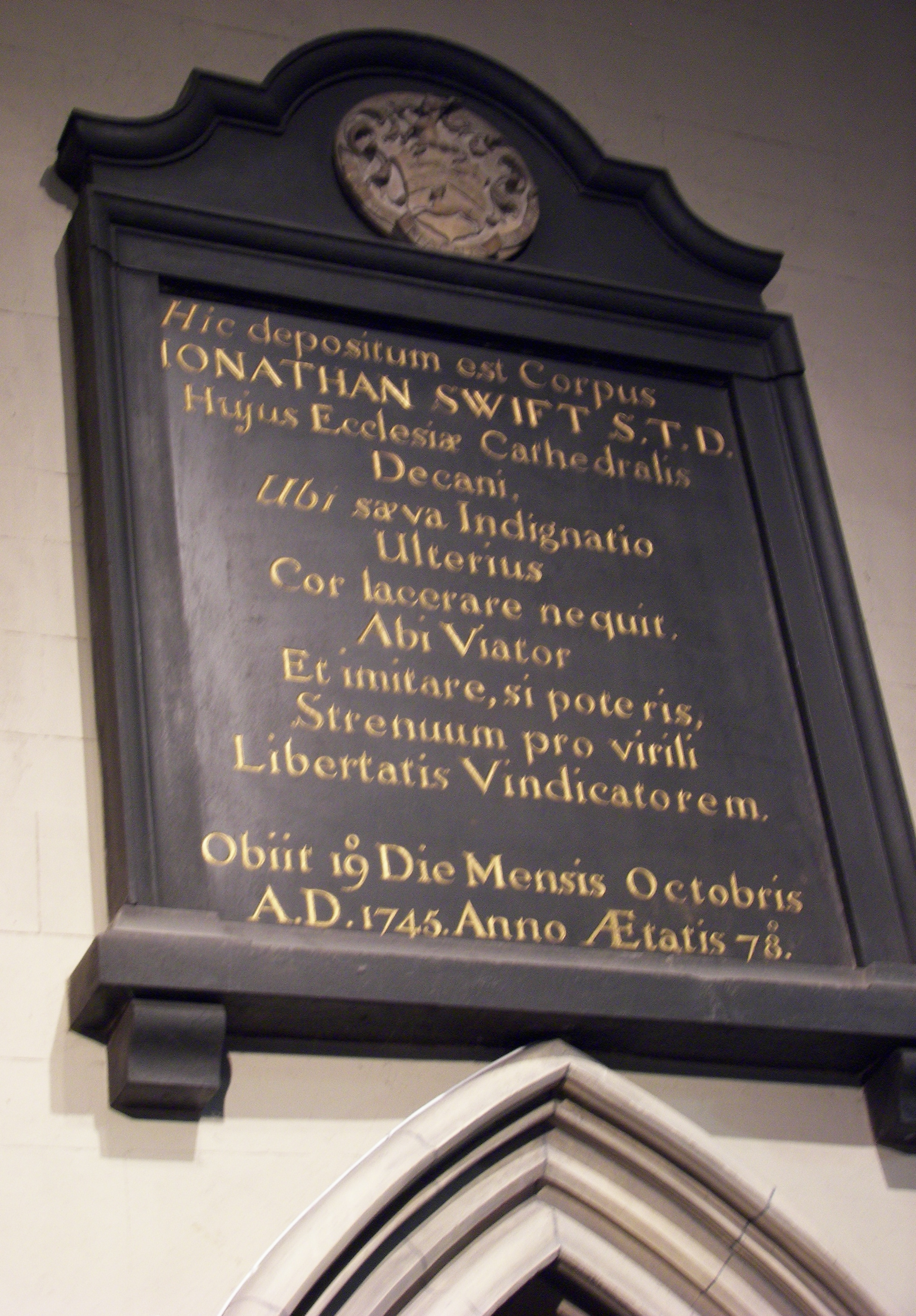
Latin epitaph for Jonathan Swift in St Patrick's Cathedral, Dublin near his burial site. Literal translation: "Here is laid the Body of Jonathan Swift, Doctor of Sacred Theology, Dean of this Cathedral Church, where savage Indignation can no longer lacerate the Heart. Go forth, Voyager, and copy, if you can, this vigorous (to the best of his ability) Champion of Liberty. He died on the 19th Day of the Month of October, A.D. 1745, in the 78th Year of his Age."

== Works published ==
- John Adams, Poems on Several Occasions, Biblical verse paraphrases, devotional works and nonreligious poems; English Colonial America
- Mark Akenside, Odes on Several Subjects, published anonymously
- John Brown, An Essay on Satire: Occasion'd by the death of Mr. Pope, published anonymously; Alexander Pope died May 30, 1744
- John Gilbert Cooper, The Power of Harmony, published anonymously
- Charles Jennens, Belshazzar: An oratorio, verse and music; performed in March; music by Handel
- Samuel Madden, Boulter's Monument, "Assisted by Samuel Johnson", according to The Concise Oxford Chronology of English Literature
- Moses Mendes, translator, Henry and Blanche; or, The Revengful Marriage, from the French of Alain-René Lesage
- Glocester Ridley, Jovi Eleutherio; or, An Offering to Liberty, published anonymously
- Thomas Scott, England's Danger and Duty, published anonymously
- William Thompson, Sickness, first two books (Book 3, 1746)

== Births ==
Death years link to the corresponding "[year] in poetry" article:

- January 18 – Caterino Mazzolà (died 1806), Italian poet and librettist
- February 2 – Hannah More (died 1833), English religious writer, poet, play and philanthropist
- February 20 – Henry James Pye (died 1813), English Poet Laureate
- March 4 (bapt.) – Charles Dibdin (died 1814), English musician, dramatist, novelist, poet, actor and songwriter
- July 5 – Carl Arnold Kortum (died 1824), German writer, poet and physician
- July 26 – Henry Mackenzie (died 1831), Scottish novelist, writer and poet
- October 12 – Félix María de Samaniego (died 1801), Spanish fabulist
- October 13 (bapt.) – William Crowe (died 1829), English poet and academic
- November 9 – William Hayley (died 1820), English poet and writer, best known as the friend and biographer of William Cowper
- December 10 – Thomas Holcroft (died 1809), English dramatist, poet and miscellaneous writer
- Also – Charles Morris (died 1838), British army officer and songwriter

== Deaths ==
Death years link to the corresponding "[year] in poetry" article:

- Spring – William Meston (born 1688), Scottish poet
- May 28 – Jonathan Richardson (born 1667), English portrait painter and poet
- June – Pierre des Maizeaux (born 1673), French writer, translator, biographer and poet
- September 11 – Mary Chandler (born 1687), English milliner and poet
- October 19 – Jonathan Swift (born 1667), Irish cleric, satirist, essayist, political pamphleteer and poet
- November 16 – William Broome (born 1689), English poet and translator

== See also ==
- Poetry
- List of years in poetry
- List of years in literature
- 18th century in poetry
- 18th century in literature
- Augustan poetry
