= 1744 in poetry =

List of years in poetry	(table)
- … 1734; 1735; 1736; 1737; 1738; 1739; 1740; 1741; 1742; 1743; 1744; 1745; 1746; 1747; 1748; 1749; 1750; 1751; 1752; 1753; 1754 …
- In literature 1741 1742 1743 1744 1745 1746 1747
- Art; Archaeology; Architecture; Literature; Music; Philosophy; Science; +...

Nationality words link to articles with information on the nation's poetry or literature (for instance, Irish or France).

== Works published ==
=== Colonial America ===
- John Armstrong, The Art of Preserving Health
- Mather Byles, Poems on Several Occasions, 31 poems written since 1727; he wrote a range of poetic forms in formal, neoclassical verse influenced by Alexander Pope
- James Logan, Cicero's Cato Major, a verse translation
- Jane Turell, Memoirs, a collection of pious poems already published as Reliquiae Turellae together with secular verses (posthumous)

=== United Kingdom ===
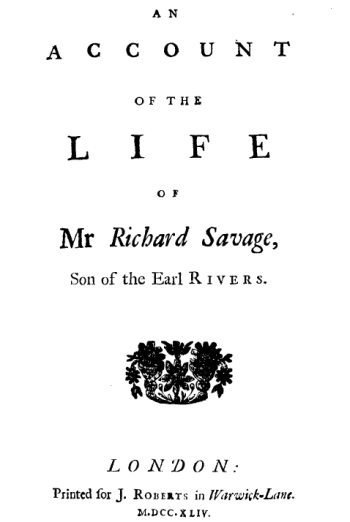
Title page of Life of Mr Richard Savage by Samuel Johnson

- Anonymous, Tommy Thumb's Pretty Song Book, the first extant collection of nursery rhymes
- Mark Akenside:
  - The Pleasures of the Imagination, a long, didactic, enormously popular poem that remained in print through most of the century (revised 1757)
  - An Epistle to Curio, published anonymously in November; "Curio" is William Pulteney, Earl of Bath
- John Armstrong, The Art of Preserving Health
- Jane Brereton, Poems on Several Occasions, the book states it was published this year, but it may have been published in January 1745, according to The Concise Oxford Chronology of English Literature
- Henry Brooke, see Edward Moore, below
- Edward Moore and Henry Brooke, Fables for the Female Sex, published anonymously; Henry Brooke wrote the last three fables
- Samuel Johnson:
  - editor, An Account of the Life of John Philip Barretier, on the late poet, compiled by Johnson from François Baratier's letters; published anonymously
  - An Account of the Life of Mr Richard Savage, on the late poet; the first major biography published by Johnson; published anonymously
- Joseph Warton, Enthusiast; or, The Lover of Nature, published anonymously on March 8
- John Wesley and Charles Wesley, A Collection of Psalms and Hymns
- Paul Whitehead, The Gymnasiad; or, Boxing Match

== Births ==
Death years link to the corresponding "[year] in poetry" article:

- July 19 – Heinrich Christian Boie (died 1806), German author and poet
- August 25 – Johann Gottfried Herder (died 1803), German philosopher, poet, and literary critic
- November 26 – Karl Siegmund von Seckendorff (1785), German
- November 30 – Karl Ludwig von Knebel (died 1834), German poet and translator
- Also:
  - Werner Hans Frederik Abrahamson (died 1812), Danish

== Deaths ==
Death years link to the corresponding "[year] in poetry" article:

- April 27 – James Miller (born 1704), English playwright, poet and satirist
- May 30 – Alexander Pope (born 1688), 56, English poet
- September 18 – Lewis Theobald (born 1688), English poet, playwright, translator and editor of Shakespeare

== See also ==
- Poetry
- List of years in poetry
- List of years in literature
- 18th century in poetry
- 18th century in literature
- Augustan poetry
- Scriblerus Club
