= 1746 in poetry =

List of years in poetry	(table)
- … 1736; 1737; 1738; 1739; 1740; 1741; 1742; 1743; 1744; 1745; 1746; 1747; 1748; 1749; 1750; 1751; 1752; 1753; 1754; 1755; 1756 …
- In literature 1743 1744 1745 1746 1747 1748 1749
- Art; Archaeology; Architecture; Literature; Music; Philosophy; Science; +...

Nationality words link to articles with information on the nation's poetry or literature (for instance, Irish or French poetry).

== Events ==
- Lucy Terry writes the first known poem by an African American, "Bars Fight, August 28, 1746", about an Indian massacre of two white families in Deerfield, Massachusetts; the ballad was related orally for a century and first printed in 1855; English Colonial America
- May 9 - Voltaire, on being admitted into the French Academy, gives a discours de réception in which he criticizes Boileau's poetry. In England, Voltaire's speech is quoted in The Gentleman's Magazine in July and the full text is translated into English in Dodsley's Museum for December 20.

== Works published ==
- Thomas Blacklock, Poems on Several Occasions
- William Collins, Odes on Several Descriptive and Allegoric Subjects, including "To Simplicity", "To Liberty", "Ode Written in the beginning of the Year 1746" and "The Passions, and Ode for Music"; published this year, although the book states "1747"
- Soame Jenyns, The Modern Fine Gentleman, published anonymously (see also The Modern Fine Lady 1751)
- Tobias George Smollett, Advice, published anonymously
- Horace Walpole, The Beauties, published anonymously
- Joseph Warton, Odes on Various Subjects

=== Akenside's "Balance of Poets" ===
In Dodsley's Museum of September 13, a literary periodical, Mark Akenside publishes two lists of personages: One, "The Temple of Modern Fame, A Vision", a list of the 24 most famous men of modern times, ranked in order of fame and including monarchs, scientists, priests, philosophers and men of letters. French poet and critic Boileau is ranked 20th, beneath Tasso and Ariosto but above Francis Bacon, John Milton Miguel de Cervantes and Molière. (William Shakespeare, Dante, Cornielle and Racine aren't on the list at all).) In some accompanying prose, Akenside wrote:

At the next trumpet, the tutelary of France went out with the assured air that was natural to her, and brought in a tall, slender man in a large wig, with a very fine sneer upon his face. She said his name was Boileau and that nobody could pretend to dispute that place with him. However, the stately genius of England opposed her; her remonstrances prevailed, and Pope took the place which Boileau thought belonged to him.

The second list, "The Balance of Poets", is a table, giving 20 modern and 20 ancient poets marks of up to 20 points in each of the following categories: Critical Ordonnance, Pathetic Ordonnance, Dramatic Ordonnance, Incidental Expression, Taste, Colouring, Versification, Moral, and Final Estimate. Boileau's "Final Estimate" rating is 12, the same as Euripides and Tasso, better than Lucretius and Terence (who both get 10), Ariosto, Dante, Horace, Pindar, Alexander Pope, Racine and Sophocles each get 13. "Perhaps neither of these curiosities of criticism is to be taken very seriously", wrote Alexander Clark, an early 20th-century literary historian. (See also, Oliver Goldsmith's "poetical scale" of 1758.)

== Births ==
Death years link to the corresponding "[year] in poetry" article:

- February 16 – Wilhelm Heinse (died 1803), German author and poet
- March 27 – Michael Bruce (died 1767), Scottish poet and hymnist
- June 5 (bapt.) – Elizabeth Hands (died 1815), English servingmaid poet
- September 3 – Friedrich Wilhelm Gotter (died 1797), German poet and dramatist
- September 13 – Ernst Theodor Johann Brückner (died 1805), German theologian and writer
- Undated – Isachar Falkensohn Behr (died 1817), Lithuanian-born German-Jewish poet and physician

== Deaths ==
Birth years link to the corresponding "[year] in poetry" article:

- January 2 – Edward Chicken (born 1698), English Geordie poet and teacher
- February 4 – Robert Blair (born 1699), Scottish member of the "Graveyard poets"
- November 12 – Mary Leapor (born 1722), English kitchenmaid poet, from measles
- December 6 – Lady Grizel Baillie (born 1665), Scottish poet

== See also ==
- Poetry
- List of years in poetry
- List of years in literature
