= 1752 in literature =

| List of years in literature | (table) |
- … 1742; 1743; 1744; 1745; 1746; 1747; 1748; 1749; 1750; 1751; 1752; 1753; 1754; 1755; 1756; 1757; 1758; 1759; 1760; 1761; 1762 …
- In poetry 1749 1750 1751 1752 1753 1754 1755
- Art; Archaeology; Architecture; Literature; Music; Philosophy; Science; +...

This article contains information about the literary events and publications of 1752.

== Events ==
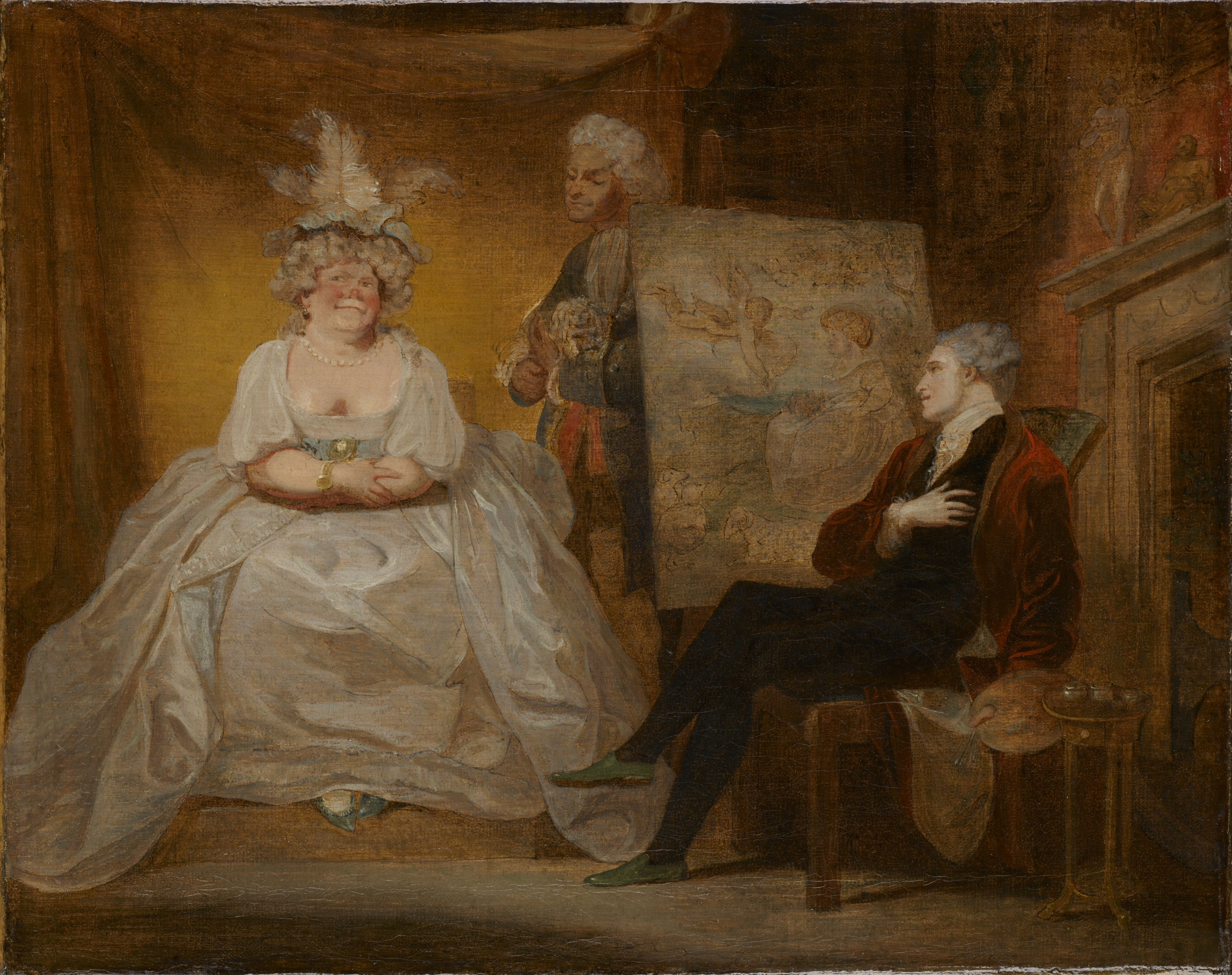
Scene from Samuel Foote's satire Taste with the playwright cross-dressed as Lady Pentweazel (painting by Robert Smirke)

- January 4 – The Paper War of 1752–1753 begins with the first issue of The Covent-Garden Journal, where Henry Fielding starts a long quarrel with John Hill by declaring war against hack writers. Tobias Smollett soon becomes involved, accusing Fielding of plagiarism.
- February 29 – Thomas Sheridan introduces at the Smock Alley Theatre in Dublin a version of Shakespeare's Coriolanus that incorporates parts of the version by James Thomson, as Coriolanus, or The Roman Matron.
- September 15 – At Williamsburg, Virginia, Lewis Hallam begins a North American tour with his brother William's company, with a production of Shakespeare's The Merchant of Venice.
- unknown date – The first of the Herculaneum papyri are discovered.

== New books ==
=== Fiction ===
- Charlotte Lennox – The Female Quixote
- Voltaire – Histoire du docteur Akakia et du natif de Saint-Malo

=== Drama ===
- Samuel Foote – Taste

=== Poetry ===
- Moses Browne – The Works and Rest of the Creation
- John Byrom – Enthusiasm
- Richard Owen Cambridge – A Dialogue Between a Member of Parliament and His Servant
- Thomas Cooke – Pythagoras
- William Mason – Elfrida
- Christopher Smart – Poems

=== Non-fiction ===
- George Ballard – Memoirs of Several Ladies of Great Britain Who Have Been Celebrated for their Writing or Skill in the Learned Languages, Arts, and Sciences
- George Berkeley – A Miscellany
- Thomas Birch – The Life of John Tillotson
- Francis Blackburne – A Serious Inquiry into the Use and Importance of External Religion
- William Dodd – The Beauties of Shakespeare
- Henry Fielding as "Sir Alexander Drawcansir" – The Covent-Garden Journal (periodical)
- John Hawkesworth – The Adventurer (periodical)
- David Hume – Political Discourses
- William Law
  - The Spirit of Love
  - The Way to Divine Knowledge
- Henry St. John – Letters on the Study and Use of History
- José Francisco de Isla – Cartas de Juan de la Encina
- Diego de Torres Villarroel – Obra`

== Births ==
- January 3 – Johannes von Müller, Swiss historian (died 1809)
- February 17 – Friedrich Maximilian Klinger, German dramatist and novelist (died 1831)
- June 13 – Fanny Burney, English novelist and diarist (died 1840)
- November 20 – Thomas Chatterton, English poet and forger of medieval poetry (died 1770)

== Deaths ==
- September 19 – Louis Fuzelier, French dramatist (born 1672)
- September 22 – Péter Apor, Hungarian historian writing in Latin (born 1676)
- October 24 – Christian Falster, Danish poet and philologist (born 1690)
- November 2 – Johann Albrecht Bengel, German New Testament commentator (born 1687)
- November 5 – Carl Andreas Duker, German classical scholar (born 1670)
- Unknown date – Li E (厲鶚), Chinese poet (born 1692)

== See also ==
- Augustan literature
