= 1749 in poetry =

List of years in poetry	(table)
- … 1739; 1740; 1741; 1742; 1743; 1744; 1745; 1746; 1747; 1748; 1749; 1750; 1751; 1752; 1753; 1754; 1755; 1756; 1757; 1758; 1759 …
- In literature 1746 1747 1748 1749 1750 1751 1752
- Art; Archaeology; Architecture; Literature; Music; Philosophy; Science; +...

Nationality words link to articles with information on the nation's poetry or literature (for instance, Irish or France).

== Works published ==
=== United Kingdom ===
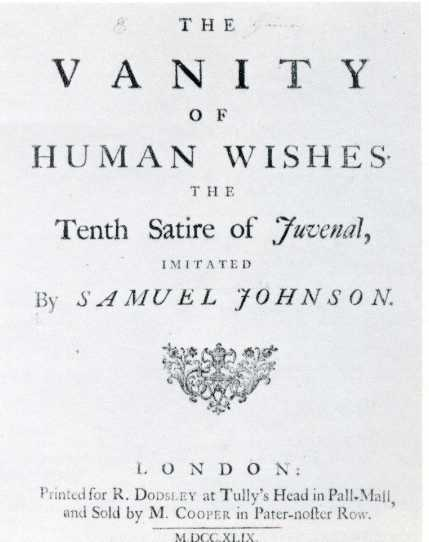
Title page of The Vanity of Human Wishes by Samuel Johnson, first published this year

- John Brown, On Liberty
- William Collins:
  - Ode Occasion'd by the Death of Mr. Thomson, James Thomson died in August 1748
  - "The Passions"
- Thomas Cooke, An Ode on Beauty, published anonymously
- Joseph Dumbleton, "A Rhapsody on Rum", a popular, solemn poem by a Southern newspaper versifier describing how rum destroys a drinker; first published in the ' 'South Carolina Gazette' ' and reprinted in newspapers throughout English Colonial America
- Aaron Hill, Gideon; or, The Patriot
- Samuel Johnson, The Vanity of Human Wishes: The tenth satire of Juvenal, imitated
- Henry Jones, Poems on Several Occasions
- William Mason, Isis: An elegy
- Gilbert West, Odes of Pindar

=== Other ===
- Joseph Green, "Entertainment for a Winter's Evening," a satirical poem about Boston's first Masonic procession; published in Boston, Colonial America
- Ewald von Kleist, Spring; Germany
- Anonymous, Fuqek Nitħaddet Malta ("I am talking about you, Malta"), Malta, approximate date

== Births ==
Death years link to the corresponding "[year] in poetry" article:

- April 19 – Ōta Nanpo (大田 南畝), the most oft-used pen name of Ōta Tan, whose other pen names include Yomo no Akara, Yomo Sanjin, Kyōkaen, and Shokusanjin 蜀山人 (died 1823), late Edo period Japanese poet and fiction writer
- May 4 – Charlotte Turner Smith (died 1806), English poet and novelist
- August 28 – Johann Wolfgang von Goethe (died 1832), German writer
- December 15 – James Graeme (died 1772), Scottish poet
- December 25 – Samuel Jackson Pratt (died 1814), English poet and writer
- Undated – Wang Yun (died 1819), Chinese poet and playwright during the Qing dynasty

== Deaths ==
Birth years link to the corresponding "[year] in poetry" article:

- January 22 – Matthew Concanen (born 1701), Irish-born English poet and writer
- February 20 – Usher Gahagan, Irish-born Latin scholar, poet and coiner, hanged
- May – Samuel Boyse (born 1702/3), Irish poet
- June 18 – Ambrose Philips (born 1674), English poet and politician
- August 13 – Johann Elias Schlegel (born 1719), German critic and poet

== See also ==
- Poetry
- List of years in poetry
- List of years in literature
