= 1751 in poetry =

List of years in poetry	(table)
- … 1741; 1742; 1743; 1744; 1745; 1746; 1747; 1748; 1749; 1750; 1751; 1752; 1753; 1754; 1755; 1756; 1757; 1758; 1759; 1760; 1761 …
- In literature 1748 1749 1750 1751 1752 1753 1754
- Art; Archaeology; Architecture; Literature; Music; Philosophy; Science; +...

Let not Ambition mock their useful toil,

Their homely joys, and destiny obscure;
Nor Grandeur hear with a disdainful smile

The short and simple annals of the poor.

— Thomas Gray, Elegy Written in a Country Church-Yard, published this year

Nationality words link to articles with information on the nation's poetry or literature (for instance, Irish or France).

== Events ==
- Christopher Smart wins the Seatonian Prize for the second year in a row. He will also win the prize in 1753 and 1755.

== Works published ==
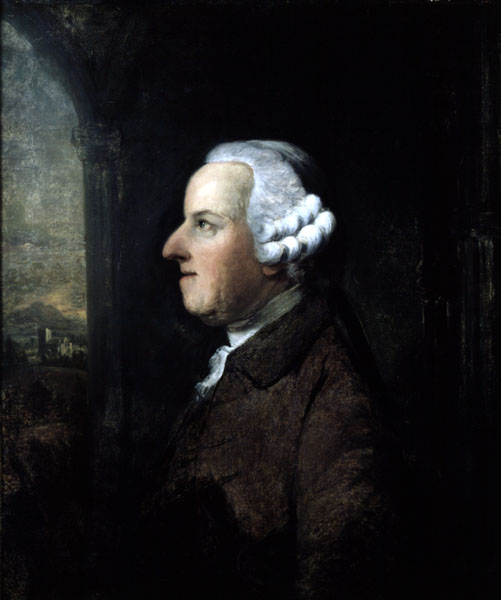
Portrait of Thomas Gray by Benjamin Wilson, date unknown, with image of the church at Stoke Poges where Gray composed An Elegy Written in a Country Church-Yard and where Gray is buried

=== United Kingdom ===
- Richard Owen Cambridge, The Scribleriad, in six books, first published separately from January through March
- Thomas Cooke, An Ode on the Powers of Poetry, published anonymously
- Nathaniel Cotton, Visions in Verse, published anonymously, a verse version for children of Gay's Fables 1727
- Thomas Gray, Elegy Written in a Country Church-Yard, published anonymously, a literary sensation published February 15 by Robert Dodsley in a quarto pamphlet with a preface by Horace Walpole (reprinted in Designes by Mr. R. Bentley 1753 and in Gray's Poems 1768); an important work of the Graveyard poets movement
- Mary Leapor, Poems Upon several Occasions, edited by Samuel Richardson and Isaac Hawkins, published posthumously (see also Poems upon Several Occasions 1748
- Moses Mendes, The Seasons
- Alexander Pope, The Works of Alexander Pope, edited by William Warburton, published posthumously

=== Switzerland, German language ===
- Johann Jakob Bodmer:
  - Die Sundflutz, an epic
  - Noah, an epic
- Solomon Gessner, Lied eines Schweizers an sein bewaffnetes Madchen, German-language work published in Switzerland

=== Other ===
- Christoph Martin Wieland, Nature of Things, alexandrine verse, in six books; Germany

== Births ==
Death years link to the corresponding "[year] in poetry" article:

- January 22 – David Richards (Dafydd Ionawr) (died 1827), Welsh poet
- February 20 – Johann Heinrich Voss (died 1826), German poet
- October 15 – David Samwell (Dafydd Ddu Feddyg) (died 1798), Welsh naval surgeon and poet
- October 30 – Richard Brinsley Sheridan (died 1816), Irish playwright, poet, speechwriter and Whig politician
- Probable date – Mary Scott (died 1793), English poet
- Approximate date – Henrietta Battier (died 1813), Irish poet, satirist and actress

== Deaths ==
Birth years link to the corresponding "[year] in poetry" article:

- April 19 – John Bancks (Banks) (born 1709), English poet and author
- May 24 – William Hamilton (born 1665?), Scottish comic poet
- October 26 – Philip Doddridge (born 1702), English Nonconformist preacher and writer

== See also ==
- Poetry
- List of years in poetry
