= 1740 in poetry =

List of years in poetry	(table)
- … 1730; 1731; 1732; 1733; 1734; 1735; 1736; 1737; 1738; 1739; 1740; 1741; 1742; 1743; 1744; 1745; 1746; 1747; 1748; 1749; 1750 …
- In literature 1737 1738 1739 1740 1741 1742 1743
- Art; Archaeology; Architecture; Literature; Music; Philosophy; Science; +...

When Britain first, at Heaven's command
Arose from out the azure main;
This was the charter of the land,
And guardian angels sang this strain:

"Rule, Britannia! rule the waves:
"Britons never will be slaves."

—first stanza of James Thomson's "Rule, Britannia", written for the masque Alfred

Nationality words link to articles with information on the nation's poetry or literature (for instance, Irish or France).

== Works published ==
=== Great Britain ===
- Sarah Dixon, Poems on Several Occasions, Canterbury: J. Abree
- John Dyer, The Ruins of Rome
- Richard Glover, An Apology for the Life of Mr. Colley Cibber
- Christopher Pitt, The Aeneid of Virgil (Books 1-4 first published 1736; see also An Essay on Vergil's Aeneid 1728, Works of Virgil 1753)
- Aquila Rose, Poems on Several Occasions, English Colonial America (posthumous)
- James Thomson, Alfred, including "Ode in Honour of Great Britain," that is, "Rule Britannia"
- Francis Tolson, Hermathenæ, Or Moral Emblems, and Ethnick Tales, with Explanatory Notes

=== Other ===
- Johann Jakob Bodmer, Von dem Wunderbaren in der Poesie a German-language critical treatise published in Switzerland

== Births ==
Death years link to the corresponding "[year] in poetry" article:

- February 4 – Carl Michael Bellman (died 1795), Swedish poet
- April 10 – Basílio da Gama (died 1795), Brazilian
- August 15 – Matthias Claudius (died 1815), German
- September 2 – Johann Georg Jacobi (died 1814), German
- November 4 – Augustus Montagu Toplady (died 1778), English clergyman and hymn-writer; an opponent of John Wesley; author of the hymn "Rock of Ages"
- Also:
  - Charlotte Brooke (died 1793), Irish poet
  - Samuel Henley (died 1815) English clergyman, school teacher, college principal, antiquarian, writer and poet
  - Thomas Moss (died 1808), English clergyman and poet
  - Christoph Friedrich Sangerhausen (died 1802), German

== Deaths ==
Death years link to the corresponding "[year] in poetry" article:

- April 23 – Thomas Tickell (born 1685), English poet and man of letters
- December 11 – Sidonia Hedwig Zäunemann (born 1711), German
- date not known – John Adams (born 1704), English Colonial American clergyman and poet
- date not known – Jane Brereton (born 1685), English poet notable as a correspondent to The Gentleman's Magazine
- date not known – Upendra Bhanja (born either 1670 or 1688), poet of Oriya Literature and awarded the title "Kavi-Samrata" - "The Emperor of the Poets"
- date not known – Amalia Wilhelmina Königsmarck (born 1663), Swedish poet

== See also ==
- Poetry
- List of years in poetry
- List of years in literature
- 18th century in poetry
- 18th century in literature
- Augustan poetry
- Scriblerus Club
