= 1741 in poetry =

List of years in poetry	(table)
- … 1731; 1732; 1733; 1734; 1735; 1736; 1737; 1738; 1739; 1740; 1741; 1742; 1743; 1744; 1745; 1746; 1747; 1748; 1749; 1750; 1751 …
- In literature 1738 1739 1740 1741 1742 1743 1744
- Art; Archaeology; Architecture; Literature; Music; Philosophy; Science; +...

Nationality words link to articles with information on the nation's poetry or literature (for instance, Irish or France).

== Events ==
- About this time Thomas Seaton established the Seatonian Prize at Cambridge University for religious poetry

== Works published ==
=== Great Britain ===
- Geoffrey Chaucer, The Canterbury Tales of Chaucer, posthumous edition edited by George Ogle
- Stephen Duck, Every Man in his Own Way
- Thomas Francklin, Of the Nature of the Gods, anonymously published translation from the Latin of Cicero's De natura deorum
- Sarah Parsons Moorhead, "Lines [. . .] Dedicated to the Rev. Mr. George Tennent", sharply criticizes the clergyman; English Colonial American
- Robert Nugent, 1st Earl Nugent, An Ode to Mankind, published anonymously
- William Shenstone, The Judgment of Hercules
- Leonard Welsted, The Summum Bonum; or, Wistest Philosophy
- John Wesley and Charles Wesley, A Collection of Psalms and Hymns (see also Hymns and Sacred Poems 1739)
- William Whitehead, The Danger of Writing Verse

=== Other ===
- Johann Jakob Bodmer, Kritische Betrachtungen über die poetischen Gemählde der Dichter a German-language critical treatise published in Switzerland

== Births ==
Death years link to the corresponding "[year] in poetry" article:

- March 25 – Daniel Schiebeler (died 1771) German writer and poet
- April 11 – Johann Heinrich Merck (died 1791), German critic, essayist, editor, writer and poet
- November 15 – Johann Kaspar Lavater (died 1801), Swiss clergyman, philosopher, writer and poet

== Deaths ==
Birth years link to the corresponding "[year] in poetry" article:

- March 17 – Jean-Baptiste Rousseau, French poet (born 1671)

== See also ==
- Poetry
- List of years in poetry
- List of years in literature
- 18th century in poetry
- 18th century in literature
- Augustan poetry
- Scriblerus Club
