= 1747 in poetry =

List of years in poetry	(table)
- … 1737; 1738; 1739; 1740; 1741; 1742; 1743; 1744; 1745; 1746; 1747; 1748; 1749; 1750; 1751; 1752; 1753; 1754; 1755; 1756; 1757 …
- In literature 1744 1745 1746 1747 1748 1749 1750
- Art; Archaeology; Architecture; Literature; Music; Philosophy; Science; +...

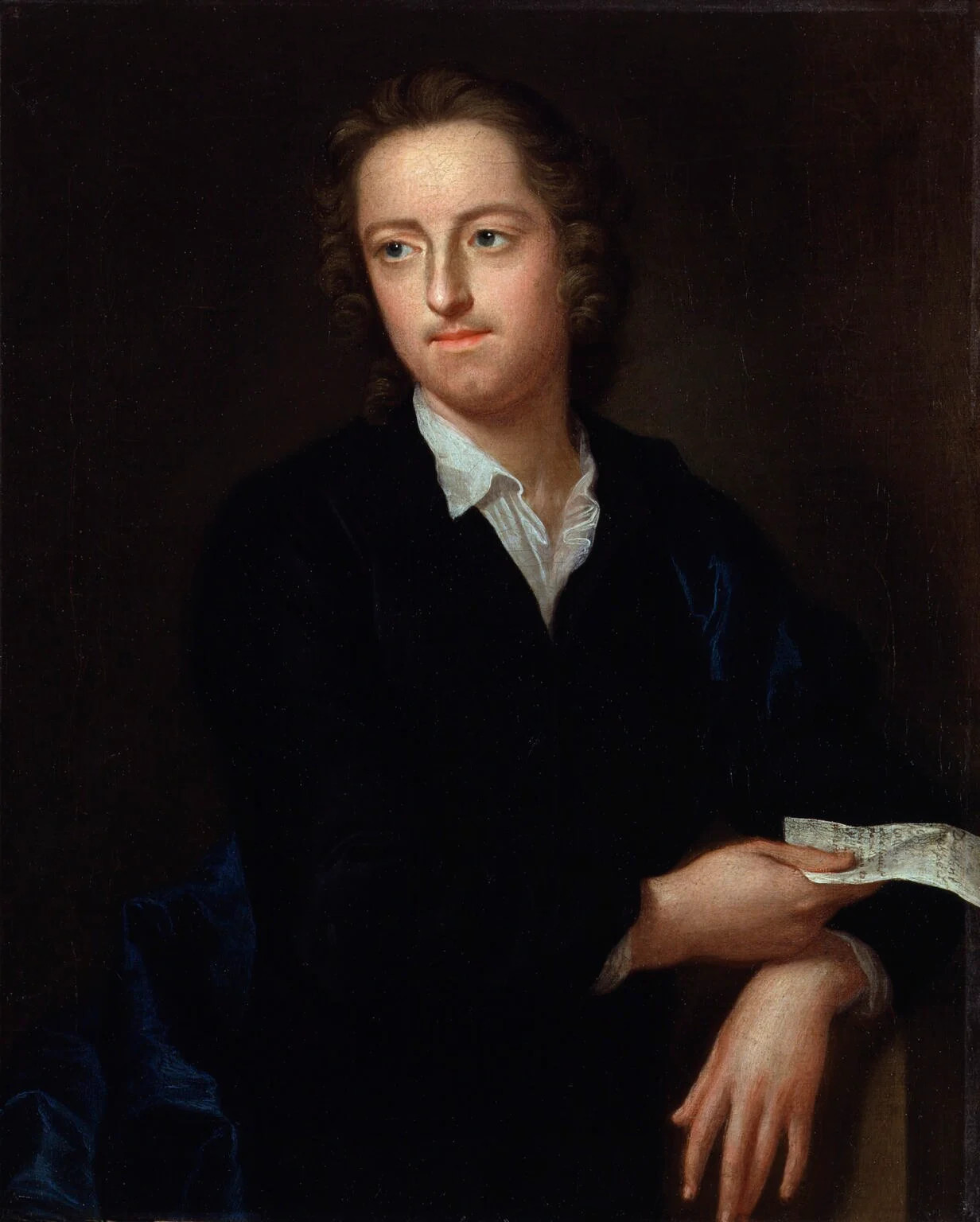
Thomas Gray, author of Ode on a Distant Prospect of Eton College, published this year

Alas! regardless of their doom,

The little victims play;

No sense have they of ills to come,

Nor care beyond to-day:

* * *
Yet, ah! why should they know their fate,
Since sorrow never comes too late,

And happiness too swiftly flies?

Thought would destroy their Paradise.
No more;—where ignorance is bliss,

'Tis folly to be wise.

— Thomas Gray, Ode on a Distant Prospect of Eton College (full text here)

Nationality words link to articles with information on the nation's poetry or literature (for instance, Irish or France).

== Events ==
- February – Horace Walpole's tabby cat Selima drowns in a Chinese porcelain vase while pursuing goldfish in his London home; he commissions an epitaph from Thomas Gray, who sends him "Ode on the Death of a Favourite Cat, Drowned in a Tub of Gold Fishes" on March 1.

== Works published ==
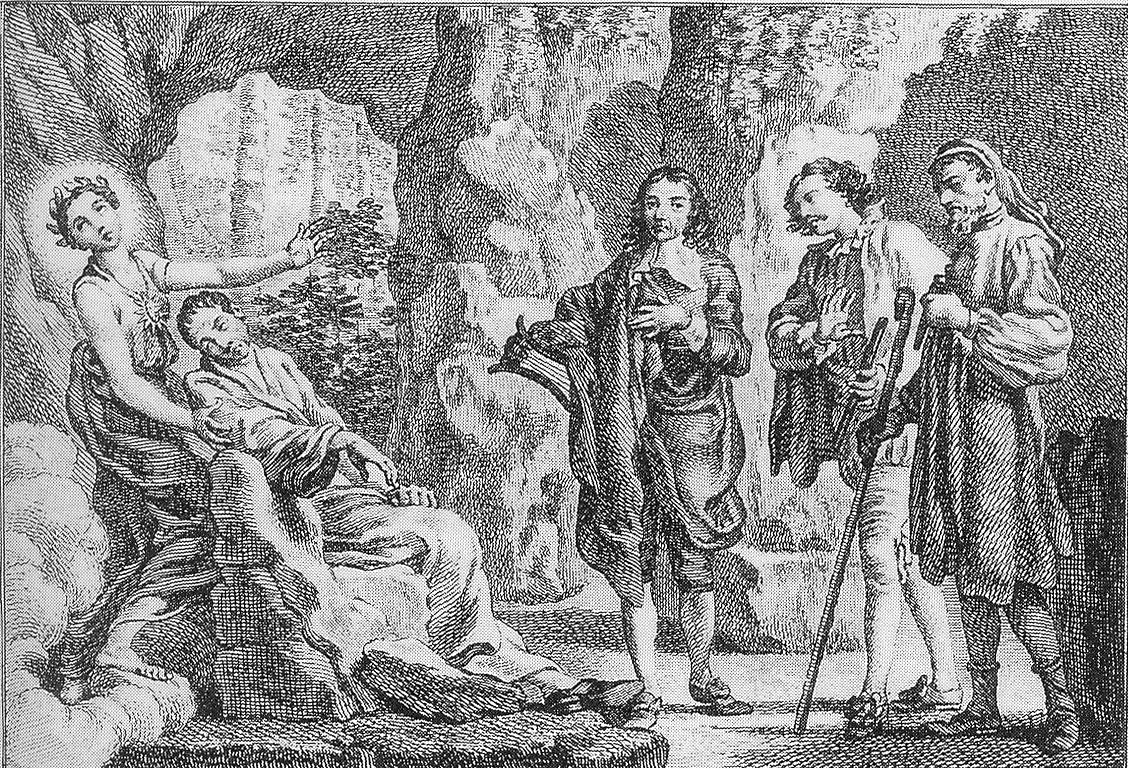
The death of Alexander Pope from Musaeus, a threnody by William Mason, published this year.

- Sir William Blackstone, The Panthion, published anonymously, attribution uncertain
- William Dunkin, Boeotia
- Philip Francis, A Poetical Translation of the Works of Horace, parallel Latin and English texts; first collected edition (originally published in separate parts: The Odes, Epodes and Carmen Seculare of Horace 1743)
- Thomas Gray, Ode on a Distant Prospect of Eton College (text), published anonymously (see quotation, above)
- Charlotte Lennox, Poems on Several Occasions
- William Livingston, Philosophic Solitude; or, The Choice of a Rural Life, celebrating rural life and nature; the book would go through five printings in the author's life; English Colonial America
- David Mallet, Amyntor and Theodora; or, The Hermit
- William Mason, Musaeus, a Monody to the memory of Pope, published anonymously; written in imitation of John Milton's Lycidas
- Lady Mary Wortley Montagu, Six Town Eclogues, with some other Poems
- Samuel Niles, A Brief and Plain Essay on God's Wonder Working Providence for New-England [. . .], a verse account of the battle of Louisburg in Nova Scotia, described as a sign of God's favor for the victors; English Colonial America
- Josiah Relph, A Miscellany of Poems
- Tobias Smollett, Reproof: A satire, published anonymously; a sequel to Advice 1746
- Thomas Warton, the younger, The Pleasures of Melancholy, published anonymously

== Works wrongly dated as 1747 ==
- William Collins, Odes on Several Descriptive and Allegoric Subjects, published 1746, although the book is dated this year

== Births ==
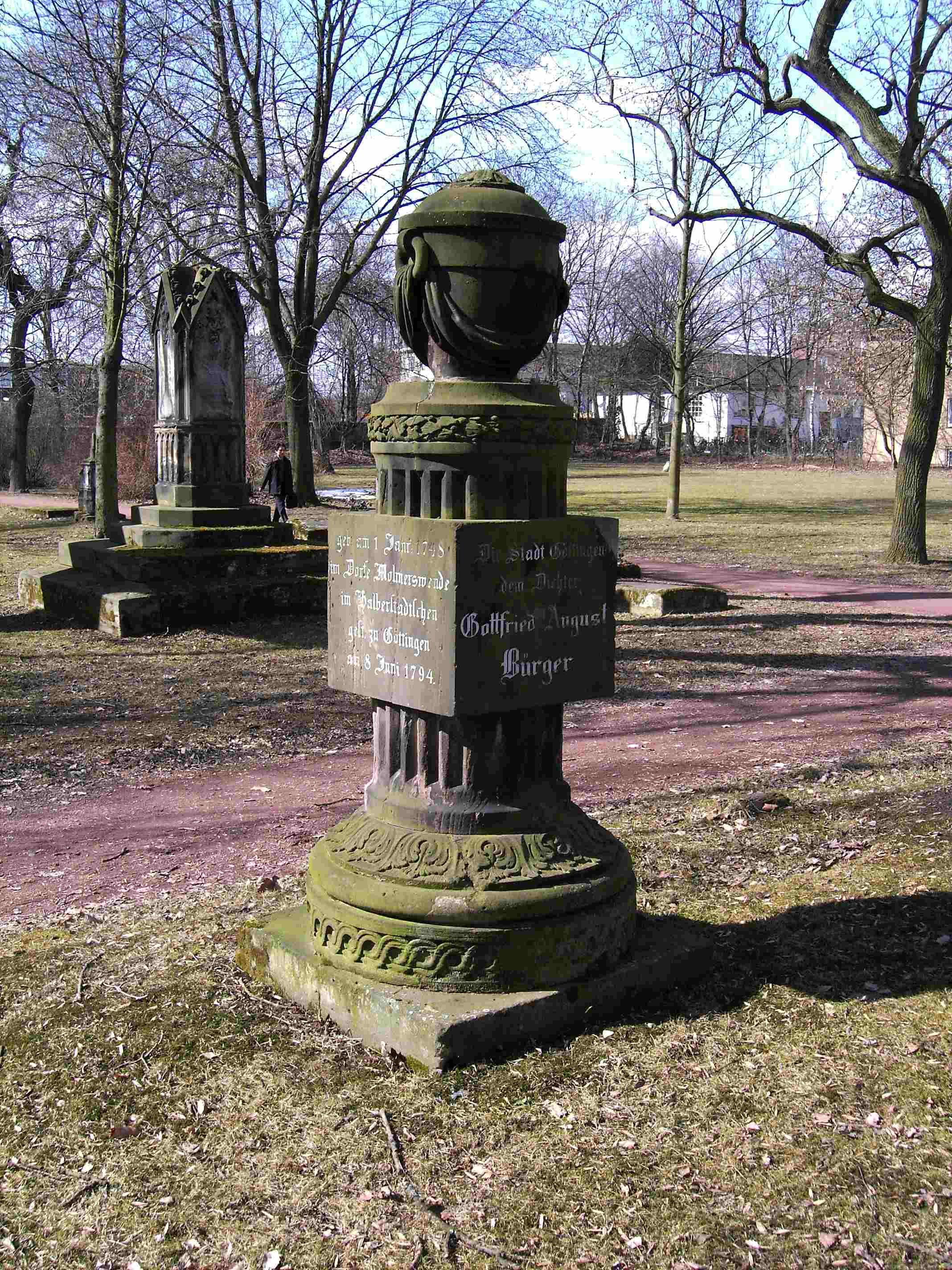
Tombstone of Gottfried August Bürger, with his preferred birth date ("1 Jan'r. 1748"). Many scholars now accept December 31, 1747

Death years link to the corresponding "[year] in poetry" article:

- January 12 – Susanna Blamire (died 1794), English poet and writer of Lallans songs
- January 15 – John Aikin (died 1822), English doctor, writer and poet
- February 19 – Heinrich Leopold Wagner (died 1779), German writer and poet
- June 24 – John O'Keeffe (died 1833), Irish dramatist and poet
- October 31 – Johann Karl Wezel (also "Carl"; died 1819), German poet, writer and educator
- December 22 – Johann Jakob Thill (died 1772), German
- December 31 – Gottfried August Bürger (see subsection below)

=== Birthdate of Gottfried August Bürger ===
Gottfried August Bürger (died 1794), German poet and author who wrote stories about Baron von Munchhausen, preferred to think of himself as being born on January 1, 1748, and so celebrated his birthdays on that date. His tombstone is inscribed with it, and many scholars have agreed with him over the generations. Many other scholars, including many modern sources, give December 31, 1747, as the day of birth, as birth records state.

== Deaths ==
Birth years link to the corresponding "[year] in poetry" article:

- January 16 – Barthold Heinrich Brockes (born 1680), German poet
- August – Leonard Welsted (born 1688), English poet and "dunce" in Alexander Pope's writings (both in The Dunciad and in Peri Bathos)
- Also:
  - Benjamin Colman (born 1673), English Colonial American clergyman and poet
  - Thomas Gilbert

== See also ==
- Poetry
- List of years in poetry
- List of years in literature
