= 1750 in poetry =

List of years in poetry	(table)
- … 1740; 1741; 1742; 1743; 1744; 1745; 1746; 1747; 1748; 1749; 1750; 1751; 1752; 1753; 1754; 1755; 1756; 1757; 1758; 1759; 1760 …
- In literature 1747 1748 1749 1750 1751 1752 1753
- Art; Archaeology; Architecture; Literature; Music; Philosophy; Science; +...

Nationality words link to articles with information on the nation's poetry or literature (for instance, Irish or France).

== Events ==
- Christopher Smart wins the Seatonian Prize for "On the Attributes of the Supreme Being"

== Works published ==
- William Collins, The Passions: An ode
- Thomas Cooke, An Ode on Moartial Virtue, published anonymously
- Robert Dodsley, The Oeconomy of Human Life, published anonymously; has also been attributed to Philip Stanhope, 4th Earl of Chesterfield; published this year, although the book states "1751"
- Mary Jones, Miscellanies in Prose and Verse
- Charlotte Lennox, The Art of Coquetry
- James Thomson, Poems on Several Occasions, posthumous
- Thomas Warton, the younger, New-market, published anonymously this year, although the book states "1751"
- Edward Young, The Complaint; or, Night-Thoughts on Life, Death and Immortality, published anonymously; the collected edition of Nights, Books 1–9 (see The Complaint 1742)

== Births ==
Death years link to the corresponding "[year] in poetry" article:

- April 24 – John Trumbull (died 1831), American poet
- June 19 – Lemuel Hopkins (died 1801), American poet and satirist
- July 30 – John Taylor (died 1826), English businessman, poet and Unitarian hymn writer
- September 5 – Robert Fergusson (died 1774), Scottish poet
- September 18 – Tomás de Iriarte y Oropesa (died 1791), Spanish poet
- October 31 – Leonor de Almeida Portugal (died 1839), Portuguese poet
- November 7 – Count Friedrich Leopold zu Stolberg-Stolberg (died 1819), German poet
- December 8 – Lady Anne Barnard, née Lindsay (died 1825), Scottish poet and author of the ballad "Auld Robin Gray"

== Deaths ==
Birth years link to the corresponding "[year] in poetry" article:

- February 8 – Aaron Hill (born 1685), English dramatist, poet and miscellaneous writer
- March 20 – Johann Sigismund Scholze (born 1705), German
- March 21 – Mehetabel Wesley Wright (born 1697), English
- July 29 – Laetitia Pilkington (born c. 1709), Anglo-Irish poet and memoirist
- John Winstanley (born 1678?), Anglo-Irish

== See also ==
- Poetry
- List of years in poetry
