= 1742 in poetry =

List of years in poetry	(table)
- … 1732; 1733; 1734; 1735; 1736; 1737; 1738; 1739; 1740; 1741; 1742; 1743; 1744; 1745; 1746; 1747; 1748; 1749; 1750; 1751; 1752 …
- In literature 1739 1740 1741 1742 1743 1744 1745
- Art; Archaeology; Architecture; Literature; Music; Philosophy; Science; +...

At thirty, a man suspects himself a fool;

Knows it at forty, and reforms his plan;
At fifty chides his infamous delay,
Pushes his prudent purpose to resolve;
In all the magnanimity of thought

Resolves, and re-resolves; then dies the same.

— Edward Young, Night Thoughts, "Night 1"

Nationality words link to articles with information on the nation's poetry or literature (for instance, Irish or France).

== Events ==
- Jonathan Swift suffers what appears to have been a stroke, losing the ability to speak and realizing his worst fears of becoming mentally disabled. ("I shall be like that tree," he once said, "I shall die at the top.") To protect him from unscrupulous hangers on, who had begun to prey on him, Swift's closest companions had him declared of "unsound mind and memory."

== Works published ==
- William Collins, Persian Eclogues, published anonymously; supposedly a translation (see also second edition, titled Oriental Eclogues, 1757)
- Thomas Cooke, Mr. Cooke's Original Poems
- Philip Francis, translator, The Odes, Epodes, and Carmen Seculare of Horace, very popular translation, published this year in Dublin (republished in 1743 in London; two more volumes, The Satires of Horace and The Epistles and Art of Poetry of Horace published 1746; see also A Poetical Translation of the Works of Horace 1747)); Irish writer published in England
- John Gwynn, attributed, The Art of Architecture: A Poem In Imitation of Horace's Art of Poetry
- James Hammond, Love Elegies, published anonymously this year, although the book states "1743", with a preface by the Earl of Chesterfield
- James Merrick, The Destruction of Troy, translated from the Ancient Greek of Triphiodorus
- Sarah Parsons Moorhead, "To the Reverend Mr. James Davenport on His Departure from Boston", criticizes evangelical clergyman; English Colonial America
- William Shenstone, The School-Mistress, the second version, with 28 stanzas (the first version, with 12 stanzas, published in Poems 1737; final, 35-stanza version in Dodsley's Collection, Volume 1, 1748)
- William Somervile, Field Sports
- Sir Charles Hanbury Williams, The Country Girl: An ode, published anonymously
- Edward Young, The Complaint, or, Night-Thoughts on Life, Death and Immortality: Night the First, published anonymously; Night the Second ("On Time, Death, Friendship") and Night the Third ("Narcissa")also published this year (see also Night the Fourth and Night the Fifth 1743, Night the Fifth 1743, Night the Sixth, Night the Seventh 1744, Night the Eighth, Night the Ninth 1745), a signal work by one of the Graveyard poets

== Births ==
Death years link to the corresponding "[year] in poetry" article:

- February 14 – Peter Wilhelm Hensler (died 1779), German writer, poet and lawyer
- February 17 - Dositej Obradović (died 1811), Serbian author, philosopher, linguist, polyglot and the first minister of education of Serbia
- March 25 – William Combe, born William Combes (died 1823), English writer, poet and adventurer
- July 1 – Georg Christoph Lichtenberg (died 1799), German writer, poet, mathematician and the first German professor of experimental physics
- September 9 – Thomas Penrose (died 1779), English poet
- October 6 – Johan Herman Wessel (died 1785), Norwegian poet
- December 12 – Anna Seward, called "the Swan of Lichfield" (died 1809), English poet
- December 25 – Charlotte von Stein (died 1827), German member of the court at Weimar, poet and close friend of Johann Wolfgang von Goethe (on whom she is a strong influence) and Friedrich Schiller
- Approximate date
  - Mary Alcock, née Cumberland (died 1798), English poet, essayist and philanthropist
  - Anne Hunter (died 1821), Scots poet and songwriter who writes the lyrics to many of Haydn’s songs

== Deaths ==
Death years link to the corresponding "[year] in poetry" article:

- April 27 – Nicholas Amhurst (born 1697), English poet and political writer
- July 9 – John Oldmixon (born 1673), English historian, pamphleteer, poet and critic
- July 19 – William Somervile (born 1675), English poet
- December 17 – François-Joseph de Beaupoil de Sainte-Aulaire (born 1643), French poet and army officer
- Date not known – David French (born 1700), English Colonial American translator

== See also ==
- Poetry
- List of years in poetry
- List of years in literature
- 18th century in poetry
- 18th century in literature
- Augustan poetry
- Scriblerus Club
