= 1753 in poetry =

List of years in poetry	(table)
- … 1743; 1744; 1745; 1746; 1747; 1748; 1749; 1750; 1751; 1752; 1753; 1754; 1755; 1756; 1757; 1758; 1759; 1760; 1761; 1762; 1763 …
- In literature 1750 1751 1752 1753 1754 1755 1756
- Art; Archaeology; Architecture; Literature; Music; Philosophy; Science; +...

Nationality words link to articles with information on the nation's poetry or literature (for instance, Irish or France).

== Events ==
- Christopher Smart wins the Seatonian Prize for the third time. He won it in 1750 and 1751 and will win it again in 1755.

== Works published ==
- John Armstrong, Taste: An epistle to a young critic
- Theophilus Cibber, The Lives of the Poets of Great Britain and Ireland, compiled mostly by Robert Shiels with added material and revisions by Cibber (prose biography)
- Thomas Cooke, An Ode on Benevolence, published anonymously
- Robert Dodsley, Public Virtue
- Thomas Francklin, Translation: A poem
- Richard Gifford, Contemplation: A poem, published anonymously
- Thomas Gray, "Hymn to Adversity"
- Henry Jones, Merit: A poem
- William Kenrick, The Whole Duty of Woman, published anonymously
- Heyat Mahmud, Hitaggyānbāṇī; Bengali
- John Ogilvie, The Day of Judgment, published anonymously
- Christopher Pitt, and others, The Works of Virgil, in Latin and English, for Pitt, publication was posthumous
- Christopher Smart, The Hilliad: an epic poem, a satire on Sir John Hill (1716?–1775), editor of the British Magazine, sparked by some of Hill's criticisms in the August 1752 issue of The Impertinent (the only issue published) of Smart's Poems on Several Occasions that year
- William Smith, A Poem on Visiting the Academy of Philadelphia, June 1753, Smith had been invited to visit by Benjamin Franklin; the academy would later become the University of Pennsylvania; Smith would later be hired as an instructor and became the first provost after he helped change the academy into the College of Philadelphia'
- John Wesley and Charles Wesley, Hymns and Spiritual Songs
- George Whitefield, Hymns for Social Worship, an anthology

== Births ==
Death years link to the corresponding "[year] in poetry" article:

- March 8 – William Roscoe (died 1831), English historian, abolitionist, poet and writer
- April 11 – Lady Sophia Burrell, née Raymond (died 1802), English poet and dramatist
- July 8 – Ann Yearsley, née Cromartie (died 1806), English poet and writer
- December 19 – George Ellis (died 1815), Jamaican-born English politician, satirical poet and literary historian
- John Frederick Bryant (died 1791), English pipe-maker and poet
- Dhiro (died 1825), Indian, Gujarati-language devotional poet
- Irayimman Tampi (died 1856), Indian, Malayalam-language poet in the court of Swati Tirunal Rama Varma; writer of Omana tinkal kitjavo, a "cradle song" (or lullaby) still popular in Malayalam
- Approximate date – Phillis Wheatley (died 1784), Senegalese-born African-American poet; becomes a slave at age 7

== Deaths ==
Death years link to the corresponding "[year] in poetry" article:

- September 18 – Hristofor Zhefarovich (born unknown), Serbian painter, engraver, writer and poet
- November – Giuseppe Valentini (born 1681), Italian poet, composer and painter

== See also ==
- Poetry
- List of years in poetry
- 18th century in poetry
- Paper War of 1752–1753
- Augustan poetry
- Augustan literature
