= 1815 in poetry =

List of years in poetry	(table)
- … 1805; 1806; 1807; 1808; 1809; 1810; 1811; 1812; 1813; 1814; 1815; 1816; 1817; 1818; 1819; 1820; 1821; 1822; 1823; 1824; 1825 …
- In literature 1812 1813 1814 1815 1816 1817 1818
- Art; Archaeology; Architecture; Literature; Music; Philosophy; Science; +...

Nationality words link to articles with information on the nation's poetry or literature (for instance, Irish or France).

== Events ==
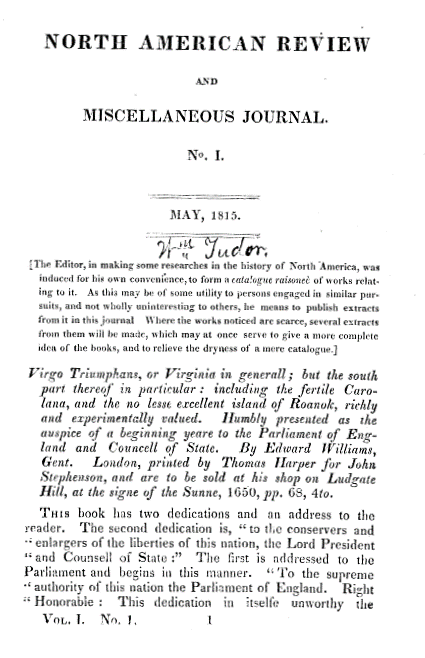
First issue of the North American Review with signature of its editor William Tudor (1779-1830)

- February 2 — Leigh Hunt released from prison after being jailed for criticizing the Prince Regent in The Examiner.
- May — North American Review founded in Boston, Massachusetts.
- September — Lord Byron writes to Samuel Taylor Coleridge of his admiration of Christabel, which he has heard recited by Walter Scott; Coleridge sends Byron a copy of the poem, and after reading it Byron realizes he has unconsciously borrowed from it in Siege of Corinth; he offers to omit the lines; yet on publication the lines remain and Byron offers an explanatory note.
- Percy Bysshe Shelley writes Alastor, or The Spirit of Solitude which lacks a title when he passes it along to his friend, Thomas Love Peacock. Peacock suggests the name "Alastor" from Roman mythology.
- First complete publication of the Old English epic poem Beowulf, in a Latin translation by Icelandic-Danish scholar Grímur Jónsson Thorkelin.

== Works published ==
=== United Kingdom ===
- Lord Byron, Hebrew Melodies, including "She Walks in Beauty", "The Destruction of Sennacherib" published in April with musical settings; though expensive at a cost of one guinea, over 10,000 copies sell; by summer, an edition of Byron's poems without the musical settings is published.
- Louisa Costello, The Maid of the Cyprus Isle, and Other Poems
- William Cowper (pronounced "Cooper"), Poems, by William Cowper, edited by John Johnson
- James Hogg, The Pilgrims of the Sun
- Leigh Hunt, The Descent of Liberty: A masque
- Ann Radcliffe, Poems
- Walter Scott:
  - "The Lord of the Isles"
  - The Field of Waterloo (the Battle of Waterloo took place on June 18)
- Lydia Sigourney, Moral Pieces in Prose and Verse, United States
- Robert Southey, The Minor Poems of Robert Southey, a reprinting of Poems 1796 and Metrical Tales 1805
- William Wordsworth:
  - Poems, including a revised version of "I Wandered Lonely as a Cloud" and Lyrical Ballads (published separately in 1798, 1800, 1802, 1805); a third volume published in 1820
  - The White Doe of Rylstone; or, The Fate of the Nortons

=== United States ===
- Hugh Henry Brackenridge, Modern Chivalry: Containing the Adventures of a Captain, and Teague O'Regan, his Servant, United States
- William Cullen Bryant, "To a Waterfowl", a widely popular and much anthologized poem in which the narrator's doubt and uncertainty is relieved by seeing a bird flying alone across the sky, inspiring belief in the guidance of God; later published in The North American Review in March 1818; Matthew Arnold called it "the best short poem in the language"
- Philip Freneau, A Collection of Poems on American Affairs, two volumes of previously unpublished verses reflecting strong patriotism; released during the War of 1812
- Lydia Sigourney, Moral Pieces in Prose and Verse, the author's first published book

=== Other ===
- Ang Duong, "Neang Kakey", Cambodian verse melodrama composed in Thailand
- Theodor Körner (died 1813), Poetischer Nachlass, Germany

== Births ==
Death years link to the corresponding "[year] in poetry" article:

- March 29 – Hagiwara Hiromichi 萩原広道 (died 1863), Japanese late-Edo period scholar of literature, philology and nativist studies (Kokugaku); also author, translator and poet; known for his commentary and literary analysis of The Tale of Genji
- October 29 – Dan Emmett (died 1904), American songwriter
- December 30 – Betty Paoli, born Barbara "Babette" Elisabeth Glück (died 1894), Austrian poet
- Meenakshi Sundaram Pillai (died 1876), Tamil scholar and poet

== Deaths ==
Birth years link to the corresponding "[year] in poetry" article:

- January 21 – Matthias Claudius (born 1740), German poet
- April 10 – George Ellis (born 1753) English antiquarian and poet
- June – Elizabeth Hands (born 1746), English poet
- December 29 – Samuel Henley (born 1740), English clergyman, schoolteacher, college principal, antiquarian, writer and poet

== See also ==
- Poetry
- List of years in poetry
- List of years in literature
- 19th century in literature
- 19th century in poetry
- Romantic poetry
- Golden Age of Russian Poetry (1800–1850)
- Weimar Classicism period in Germany, commonly considered to have begun in 1788 and to have ended either in 1805, with the death of Friedrich Schiller, or 1832, with the death of Goethe
- List of poets
