= 1814 in poetry =

| List of years in poetry | (table) |
- … 1804; 1805; 1806; 1807; 1808; 1809; 1810; 1811; 1812; 1813; 1814; 1815; 1816; 1817; 1818; 1819; 1820; 1821; 1822; 1823; 1824 …
- In literature 1811 1812 1813 1814 1815 1816 1817
- Art; Archaeology; Architecture; Literature; Music; Philosophy; Science; +...

Nationality words link to articles with information on the nation's poetry or literature (for instance, Irish or France).

== Events ==
- January - Lord Byron writes his semi-autobiographical tale in verse The Corsair while snowed up at Newstead Abbey in England with his half-sister, Augusta Leigh. It is published on February 1 by John Murray
- April 15 - Augusta Leigh bears a daughter, Elizabeth Medora Leigh, perhaps by Byron.
- July 28–September 13 - English poet Percy Bysshe Shelley abandons his pregnant wife and runs away with the 16-year-old Mary Wollstonecraft Godwin, accompanied by her stepsister Jane Clairmont (also 16), to war-ravaged France, quickly moving on to Switzerland.
- September 12–15 - Battle of Baltimore (War of 1812): American lawyer Francis Scott Key, witnessing the bombardment of Baltimore, Maryland, from a British ship, writes "Defence of Fort McHenry". His brother-in-law arranges to have the poem published in a broadside with a recommended tune on September 17 and on September 20, both the Baltimore Patriot and The American print it; the song quickly becomes popular, with seventeen newspapers from Georgia to New Hampshire reproducing it. In 1931 as "The Star-Spangled Banner" it is officially adopted at the national anthem of the United States:

O! thus be it ever, when freemen shall stand,

Between their lov'd home and the war's desolation,

Blest with vict'ry and peace, may the Heav'n rescued land,

Praise the Power that hath made and preserv'd us a nation!

Then conquer we must, when our cause it is just,
And this be our motto — "In God is our Trust;"

And the star-spangled Banner in triumph shall wave,
O'er the Land of the Free and the Home of the Brave.

—last stanza of Francis Scott Key's "The Battle of Fort McHenry"

== Works published ==
=== United Kingdom ===
- Thomas Brown, The Paradise of Coquettes
- Lord Byron:
  - The Corsair, sells 10,000 copies on the first day (February 1), and over 25,000 copies in the first month, going through seven editions
  - "Lara, a Tale" written May 14–June 14 and published anonymously in the summer, it sells 6,000 copies by early August; published together with "Jacqueline, a Tale" by Samuel Rogers
  - "Ode to Napoleon Buonaparte", published anonymously written April 9 when Napoleon abdicates, published April 16
- Henry Cary, translation of Dante's Divine Comedy, complete in blank verse
- George Daniel, The Modern Dunciad, published anonymously
- Pierce Egan (the elder), The Mistress of Royalty; or, The Loves of Florizel and Perdita, published anonymously; about the relationship between the Prince of Wales ("Florizel") and Mrs. Mary Robinson ("Perdita")
- James Hogg, writing as "J. H. Craig, of Douglas", The Hunting of Badlewe
- Leigh Hunt, The Feast of the Poets, revised and enlarged in 1815, first published in The Reflector, 1810
- Isabella Lickbarrow, Poetical Effusions
- Thomas Love Peacock:
  - Sir Hornbrook; or, Childe Launcelot's Expedition
  - Sir Proteus: A satirical ballad, dedicated to Lord Byron; written under the name "P. M. O'Donovan"
- J. H. Reynolds, The Eden of the Imagination
- Robert Southey:
  - Odes to the Prince Regent, the Emperor of Russia and the King of Prussia, the author's first work as Poet Laureate; republished in 1821 as Carmen Triumphale, for the Commencement of the Year 1814
  - Roderick, the Last of the Goths
- William Wordsworth, The Excursion: Being a portion of The Recluse, a poem

=== United States ===
- Francis Scott Key, "The Battle of Fort McHenry" (see Events above)
- William Littell, Festoons of Fancy, Consisting of Compositions Amatory, Sentimental and Humorous in Verse and Prose, mostly poems on women and on love but notable for satires on government officials, a recently passed law on divorce and on the process of elections
- Salmagundi; or, the Whim–whams and Opinions of Launcelot Langstaff, Esq. and Others ... A New and Improved Edition, with Tables of Contents and a Copious Index, including poems by James Kirke Paulding, New York: Published by David Longworth, United States
- Esther Talbot, "Peace", words dated April 4, unpublished until music setting in Music in Stoughton: A Brief History (1989)

=== Other ===
- Bernhard Severin Ingemann, De sorte Riddere ("The Black Knights"), Denmark
- Adam Oehlenschlager, Helge, a narrative cycle, Denmark

== Births ==
Death years link to the corresponding "[year] in poetry" article:

- January 7 – Robert Nicoll, Scottish (died 1837)
- January 10 – Aubrey Thomas de Vere, Irish (died 1902)
- March 9 (February 25 O.S.) – Taras Shevchenko, Ukrainian poet and artist (died 1861)
- May 21 – Louis Janmot, French painter and poet (died 1892)
- June 28 – Frederick William Faber, English poet, hymnodist, theologian and Catholic convert (died 1863)
- August 26 – Johann Pucher (Janez Puhar), Slovene Catholic priest, inventor, scientist, photographer, artist and poet in Slovene and German (died 1864)
- September 3 – James Joseph Sylvester, English mathematician and translator (died 1897)
- December 18 – Sarah T. Bolton, née Sarah Tittle Barrett, American (died 1893)

== Deaths ==
Birth years link to the corresponding "[year] in poetry" article:

- January 4 – Johann Georg Jacobi (born 1740), German
- October 4 – Samuel Jackson Pratt (born 1749), English poet and writer
- October 14 – Mercy Otis Warren (born 1727), American playwright, poet and historian
- November 22 – Edward Rushton (born 1756), English poet, bookseller and abolitionist

== See also ==
- Poetry
- List of years in poetry
- List of years in literature
- 19th century in literature
- 19th century in poetry
- Romantic poetry
- Golden Age of Russian Poetry (1800–1850)
- Weimar Classicism period in Germany, commonly considered to have begun in 1788 and to have ended either in 1805, with the death of Friedrich Schiller, or 1832, with the death of Goethe
- List of poets
