= 1831 in poetry =

This article covers 1831 in poetry. Nationality words link to articles with information on the nation's poetry or literature (for instance, Irish or France).

== Works ==
=== United Kingdom ===
- John Banim and Michael Banim, The Chaunt of the Cholera
- Henry Glassford Bell, Summer and Winter Hours
- Thomas Campbell, Poland: A Poem. Lines on the View from St. Leonard's
- James Hogg, Songs, by the Ettrick Shepherd
- Thomas Hood, The Dream of Eugene Aram, the Murderer
- Charles Lamb, anonymously published, Satan in Search of a Wife
- Walter Savage Landor, Gebir, Count Julian and Other Poems (Geber originally published 1798; Count Julian originally published 1812)
- Winthrop Mackworth Praed, The Ascent of Elijah
- Letitia Elizabeth Landon, writing under the pen name "L.E.L." Fisher's Drawing Room Scrap Book, 1832

=== United States ===
- William Cullen Bryant, "Song of Marion's Men", lyric poem, about Francis Marion, an American military figure in the American Revolution
- Oliver Wendell Holmes Sr., "The Last Leaf", about an aging participant in the Boston Tea Party
- Lowell Mason, Church Psalmody
- Edgar Allan Poe, Poems by Edgar Allan Poe, Second Edition, including early, unrevised versions of some of the author's most significant verses, including "To Helen", "Israfel" and "The Doomed City"; the preface, "Letter to B", discusses Poe's critical theories, much of which was borrowed from Samuel Taylor Coleridge
- Samuel Francis Smith, "America", five stanzas; one of the most popular patriotic hymns in the United States, written at Lowell Mason's request; composed in 30 minutes; set to the music of the British anthem "God Save the King" and first sung at an Independence Day gathering in Boston; known for its opening line "My country 'tis of thee", published by Mason in The Choir 1832
- William Joseph Snelling, Truth: A New Year's Gift for Scribblers, a verse satire on contemporary poets, calling many of them inferior, especially those portraying American Indians with stereotypes
- John Greenleaf Whittier, Legends of New-England in Prose and Verse, the author's first book; uncomfortable with the gothic style of the volume, Whittier suppressed it later
- Emma Hart Willard, The Fulfillment of a Promise, includes "Rocked in the Cradle of the Deep", about the poet's trip home from Europe, which became a very popular poem set to music by Joseph P. Knight
- Nathaniel Parker Willis, Poem Delivered Before the Society of United Brothers

=== Other ===
- Victor Hugo, Les Feuilles d'automne, France
- Giacomo Leopardi, Canti, Italy
- George Métivier, Rimes Guernesiaises, Guernsey

== Births ==
Death years link to the corresponding "[year] in poetry" article:

- March 18 – David Mills (died 1903), Canadian poet, politician, author and jurist
- June 13 – James Clerk Maxwell (died 1879), Scottish mathematician and theoretical physicist whose poetry was published by a friend in 1881, two years after his death
- July 7 – Jane Elizabeth Conklin (died 1914), American poet and religious writer
- September 12 – Álvares de Azevedo (died 1852), Brazilian
- October 17 – Isa Craig (died 1903), Scots
- November 8 – Robert Bulwer-Lytton (died 1891), English novelist and poet
- December 22 – Charles Stuart Calverley, English poet, wit and literary father of what has been called "the university school of humour"
- Date not known – Charles R. Thatcher (thought to have died in 1882), Australian

== Deaths ==
Birth years link to the corresponding "[year] in poetry" article:

- January 14 – Henry Mackenzie (born 1745), Scottish novelist, writer, critic and poet
- January 21 – Ludwig Achim von Arnim (born 1781), German poet and novelist
- March 8 - Laurence Hynes Halloran, 64, Irish-Australian pioneer schoolteacher and journalist; publishes poetry before being shipped to Australia as a convict
- May 11 – John Trumbull, 81 (born 1750), American
- June 30 - William Roscoe (born 1753), English poet
- December 23 - Henry Louis Vivian Derozio, 22 (born 1809), Indian poet writing in English and academic of Eurasian and Portuguese descent
- Also - Ryōkan 良寛 (born 1758), Japanese waka poet and calligrapher, Buddhist monk, often a hermit

== See also ==
- List of years in poetry
- List of years in literature
- 19th century in poetry
- 19th century in literature
- Golden Age of Russian Poetry (1800–1850)
- Weimar Classicism period in Germany, commonly considered to have begun in 1788 and to have ended either in 1805, with the death of Friedrich Schiller, or 1832, with the death of Goethe
- Lists of poets
- Poetry
