= 1759 in poetry =

List of years in poetry	(table)
- … 1749; 1750; 1751; 1752; 1753; 1754; 1755; 1756; 1757; 1758; 1759; 1760; 1761; 1762; 1763; 1764; 1765; 1766; 1767; 1768; 1769 …
- In literature 1756 1757 1758 1759 1760 1761 1762
- Art; Archaeology; Architecture; Literature; Music; Philosophy; Science; +...

Nationality words link to articles with information on the nation's poetry or literature (for instance, Irish or France).

== Events ==
- August 12 — Battle of Kunersdorf (Seven Years' War): German poet Major Ewald Christian von Kleist is fatally injured.
- September 12 — Just before the Battle of the Plains of Abraham, in the Seven Years' War, British General James Wolfe is said to have recited Thomas Gray's Elegy Written in a Country Churchyard (1751) to his officers, adding, "Gentlemen, I would rather have written that poem than take Quebec tomorrow".
- Christopher Smart, confined to St Luke's Hospital for Lunatics in London, begins to write Jubilate Agno.
- Johann Ernst Immanuel Walch becomes professor of rhetoric and poetry at the University of Jena.

== Works published ==
- Samuel Butler (died 1680), The Genuine Remains in Verse and Prose, posthumous
- Edward Capell, editor, Prolusions; or, Select Pieces of Antient Poetry, published anonymously this year, although the book states 1760
- John Gilbert Cooper, translator, Ver-Vert; or, The Nunnery Parrot, published anonymously, translated from the French of Jean-Baptiste-Louis Gresset's mock epic Ver-Vert 1733
- Frances Greville, "Prayer for Indifference", published in the Edinburgh Chronicle
- Mary Latter, The Miscellaneous Works
- William Mason, Caractacus
- Augustus Toplady (born 1740), Poems on Sacred Subjects, published anonymously in the author's 18th birthday year
- Francis Williams, "Ode to Governor Haldane", the first known published poem by a Jamaican black
- Edward Young, Conjectures on Original Composition (criticism)

== Births ==
Death years link to the corresponding "[year] in poetry" article:

- January 25 – Robert Burns, also known as "Rabbie Burns", "Scotland's favourite son", "the Ploughman Poet", "the Bard of Ayrshire" and, in Scotland, simply "The Bard" (died 1796), Scottish poet and lyricist, called the national poet of Scotland
- March 26 – John Mayne (died 1836), Scottish poet, journalist and printer
- November 10 – Friedrich Schiller (died 1805), German poet and dramatist
- date not known:
  - A. Flowerdew (died 1830), English poet and hymnist
  - Sarah Wentworth Apthorp Morton (died 1846), American

== Deaths ==
Death years link to the corresponding "[year] in poetry" article:

- June 12 – William Collins, 37 (born 1721), English poet
- August 24 – Ewald Christian von Kleist (born 1715), German poet
- November 2 – Sir Charles Hanbury Williams (born 1708), Welsh diplomat and satiric poet
- Approximate year
  - Martha Wadsworth Brewster (born 1710), American poet
  - Mary Masters (born 1694?), English poet

== See also ==
- Poetry
- List of years in poetry
- 18th century in poetry
- Augustan poetry
- Augustan literature
