= 1751 in philosophy =

1751 in philosophy

== Publications ==
- David Hume, An Enquiry Concerning the Principles of Morals (1751){01}

== Births ==
- March 16 - James Madison

== Deaths ==
- November 11 - Julien Offray de La Mettrie (born 1709)
