= 1818 in poetry =

A thing of beauty is a joy for ever:

Its loveliness increases; it will never

Pass into nothingness;

— John Keats, Endymion

Nationality words link to articles with information on the nation's poetry or literature (for instance, Irish or France).

== Events ==
=== John Keats ===
- June–August – Keats with his friend Charles Armitage Brown makes a walking tour of Scotland, Ireland and the English Lake District. On July 11 while in Scotland he visits Burns Cottage, the birthplace of Robert Burns (1759–1796). Before Keats arrives, he writes to a friend that "one of the pleasantest means of annulling self is approaching such a shrine as the cottage of Burns — we need not think of his misery — that is all gone — bad luck to it — I shall look upon it all with unmixed pleasure." but his encounter with the cottage's alcoholic custodian returns him to thoughts of misery. On August 2 he climbs to the summit of Ben Nevis, on which he writes a sonnet.
- September–November – Keats meets and falls in love with Fanny Brawne (1800–65).
- December – Keats is invited to move into Brown's home at Wentworth Place, in Hampstead, at this time a pastoral suburb north of London. In the next 17 months as Brown's housemate, Keats writes "Ode on a Grecian Urn", "The Eve of St. Agnes" and "Ode to a Nightingale", among other works.

=== Other events ===
- January 11 – Percy Bysshe Shelley's "Ozymandias" is published in Leigh Hunt's weekly The Examiner (London; p. 24) under the pen name 'Glirastes'; Horace Smith's contribution to the same informal sonnet-writing competition, "On a Stupendous Leg of Granite, Discovered Standing by Itself in the Deserts of Egypt, with the Inscription Inserted Below" is published on February 1 under his initials.
- February 4 – While John Keats and Percy Bysshe Shelley are at Leigh Hunt's home for the evening, all three compete in composing sonnets about the Nile. Hunt is judged the winner, with:

It flows through old hushed Egypt and its sands,
Like some grave mighty thought threading a dream,
And times and things, as in that vision, seem
Keeping along it their eternal stands [...]

- March 12 – Percy Bysshe Shelley and family, along with his sister-in-law Claire Clairmont, mother of Lord Byron's child, leaves England for the Continent, reaching Milan April 4 and visiting the Italian lakes. In June they move to the Bagni di Lucca, where Shelley translates Plato's Symposium, writes "On Love," and completes Rosalind and Helen. In August, they move to Este, near Venice to be closer to Lord Byron; there Shelley begins Prometheus Unbound. Their daughter Clara dies September 24 and the Shelleys visit Venice October 12–31, then travel to Rome and Naples, where they remain until February 28, 1819.
- September 19 – Lord Byron writes to Thomas Moore, telling him he has completed the first Canto of Don Juan (which he began on July 3).
- Emancipated convict and writer of patriotic verse Michael Massey Robinson is paid by Lachlan Macquarie, Governor of New South Wales, for services as poet laureate to the colony.

== Works published ==
=== United Kingdom ===
Ozymandias
By Percy Bysshe Shelley

I met a traveller from an antique land
Who said: Two vast and trunkless legs of stone
Stand in the desert. Near them, on the sand,
Half sunk, a shattered visage lies, whose frown
And wrinkled lip, and sneer of cold command
Tell that its sculptor well those passions read
Which yet survive, stamped on these lifeless things,
The hand that mocked them and the heart that fed.
And on the pedestal these words appear:
"My name is Ozymandias, king of kings:
Look on my works, ye Mighty, and despair!"
Nothing beside remains. Round the decay
Of that colossal wreck, boundless and bare
The lone and level sands stretch far away.

- Bernard Barton:
  - The Convict's Appeal
  - Poems, anonymously published as "by an amateur"
- Thomas Haynes Bayly, published under the pen name "Q. in the Corner", Parliamentary Letters, and Other Poems
- Mary Matilda Betham, Vignettes
- William Blake, Jerusalem The Emanation of the Giant Albion, illuminated book of 100 plates, estimated to have been published this date, although "1804" is printed on the title plate, but "this probably indicates the date when Blake began the work"
- Sir Thomas Burges, The Dragon Knight
- Lord Byron:
  - Beppo: A Venetian story, published anonymously
  - Childe Harold's Pilgrimage: Canto the Fourth (see also Childe Harold's Pilgrimage, 1812, 1816)
- William Hazlitt, Lectures on the English Poets (criticism)
- Felicia Dorothea Hemans, Translations from Camoens and Other Poets, with Original Poetry
- Leigh Hunt:
  - Foliage; or, Poems Original and Translated
  - Literary Pocket-Book (miscellaneous poetry and prose)
- John Keats:
  - Endymion
  - "When I have Fears that I may Cease to Be"
- Thomas Moore, publishing as "Thomas Brown the Younger", The Fudge Family in Paris, at least nine editions published this year
- Hannah More, Tragedies
- Thomas Love Peacock, Rhododaphne; or, The Thessalian Spell
- Percy Bysshe Shelley:
  - Julian and Maddalo
  - Ozymandias
- William Sotheby, Farewell to Italy, and Occasional Poems

=== United States ===
- Phoebe Hinsdale Brown, "I love to steal awhile away", American religious hymn
- William Cullen Bryant, To a Waterfowl
- Thomas Green Fessenden, The ladies monitor, a poem (Bellows Falls: Printed by Bill Blake & Co.)
- John Neal:
  - The Portico, first long poems published in volume 5
  - Battle of Niagara, considered the best poetic description of Niagara Falls up to that time
  - Goldau, or, the Maniac Harper, which accompanied Battle of Niagara in a bound volume
- James Kirke Paulding, The Backwoodsman (Philadelphia: M. Thomas), a long poem in heroic couplets about a New York pioneer on the frontier in Kentucky
- Samuel Woodworth, The Poems, Odes, Songs, and Other Metrical Effusions, of Samuel Woodworth (New York: Abraham Asten and Matthias Lopez)
- Richard Henry Wilde, "My Life is Like the Summer Rose", John Greenleaf Whittier called it "a perfect poem"

== Works misdated as this year ==
- Percy Bysshe Shelley, The Revolt of Islam, originally Laon and Cythna (actually printed in December 1817 although the book states the year of publication as this year)

== Works published in other languages ==
- Kristijonas Donelaitis, The Seasons ("Metai" in Lithuanian), written about 1765–1775, is published in Königsberg
- Adam Mickiewicz, City Winter ("Zima miejska" in Polish), his first poem, is published in Vilnius

== Births ==
Death years link to the corresponding "[year] in poetry" article:

- January 24 – John Mason Neale, English priest, scholar and hymnwriter (died 1866)
- April – Cecil Frances Alexander, née Humphreys, Anglo-Irish hymnwriter (died 1895)
- July 30 – Emily Brontë, English novelist and poet (died 1848)
- October 16 – William Forster, Australian politician, Premier of New South Wales and poet (died 1882)
- October 22 – Leconte de Lisle, French Parnassian poet (died 1894)
- December 24 – Eliza Cook, English writer, poet and radical campaigner (died 1889)
- Date unknown:
  - Alexander McLachlan, Scottish-born Canadian poet (died 1896)
  - Charlotta Öberg, Swedish poet (died 1856)

== Deaths ==
Birth years link to the corresponding "[year] in poetry" article:

- May 14 or 16 – Matthew Lewis, English Gothic writer (born 1775)
- November 23 – John Williams, English satirist, journalist and poet, in the United States (born 1716)

== See also ==
- Poetry
- List of years in poetry
- List of years in literature
- 19th century in literature
- 19th century in poetry
- Romantic poetry
- Golden Age of Russian Poetry (1800–1850)
- Weimar Classicism period in Germany, commonly considered to have begun in 1788 and to have ended either in 1805, with the death of Friedrich Schiller, or 1832, with the death of Goethe
- List of poets
