= The Pleasures of the Imagination =

The Pleasures of the Imagination is a long didactic poem by Mark Akenside, first published in 1744.

== Contents ==
The first book defines the powers of imagination and discusses the various kinds of pleasure to be derived from the perception of beauty; the second distinguishes works of imagination from philosophy; the third describes the pleasure to be found in the study of man, the sources of ridicule, the operations of the mind, in producing works of imagination, and the influence of imagination on morals. The ideas were largely borrowed from Joseph Addison's essays on the imagination in The Spectator and from Lord Shaftesbury. Edward Dowden complains that "his tone is too high-pitched; his ideas are too much in the air; they do not nourish themselves in the common heart, the common life of man." Samuel Johnson praised the blank verse of the poems, but found fault with the long and complicated periods.

== Inspiration ==
Akenside got the idea for the poem during a visit to Morpeth in 1738.

== Similarly-named work ==
The Pleasures of the Imagination may also refer to The Spectator papers numbered 411 through 421, by Joseph Addison. These specific papers differed from the rest in that they were non-narrative and philosophical, and contained less obvious social commentary.
