= William Meston =

William Meston (1688? – 1745) was a Scottish poet.

The son of a blacksmith, he was educated at Marischal College, Aberdeen, took part in the Jacobite rebellion of 1715, and had to go into hiding. His Knight of the Kirk (1723) is an imitation of Hudibras.

His "Mob Contra Mob" or "The Rabblers Rabbled" was printed in Edinburgh in 1738 and reprinted by Peter Williamson also in Edinburgh c.1770.
