= 1817 in poetry =

Nationality words link to articles with information on the nation's poetry or literature (for instance, Irish or France).

== Events ==
- February 28 – Lord Byron writes a letter to Thomas Moore and includes in it his poem, "So, we'll go no more a roving". Moore will publish the poem in 1830 as part of Letters and Journals of Lord Byron.
- March – Percy and Mary Shelley with Claire Clairmont and the latter's new daughter by Byron, Allegra (at this time called Alba), having moved from Bath, begin a year's residence in Marlow, Buckinghamshire, England, where Mary completes Frankenstein and gives birth to her third child, and Percy writes The Revolt of Islam.
- September 19 – The body of Scottish poet Robert Burns (died 1796) is moved to a new mausoleum in Dumfries.
- December 28 – English painter Benjamin Haydon introduces John Keats to William Wordsworth and Charles Lamb at a dinner in London to celebrate progress on his painting Christ's Entry into Jerusalem (in which all feature).

== Works published ==
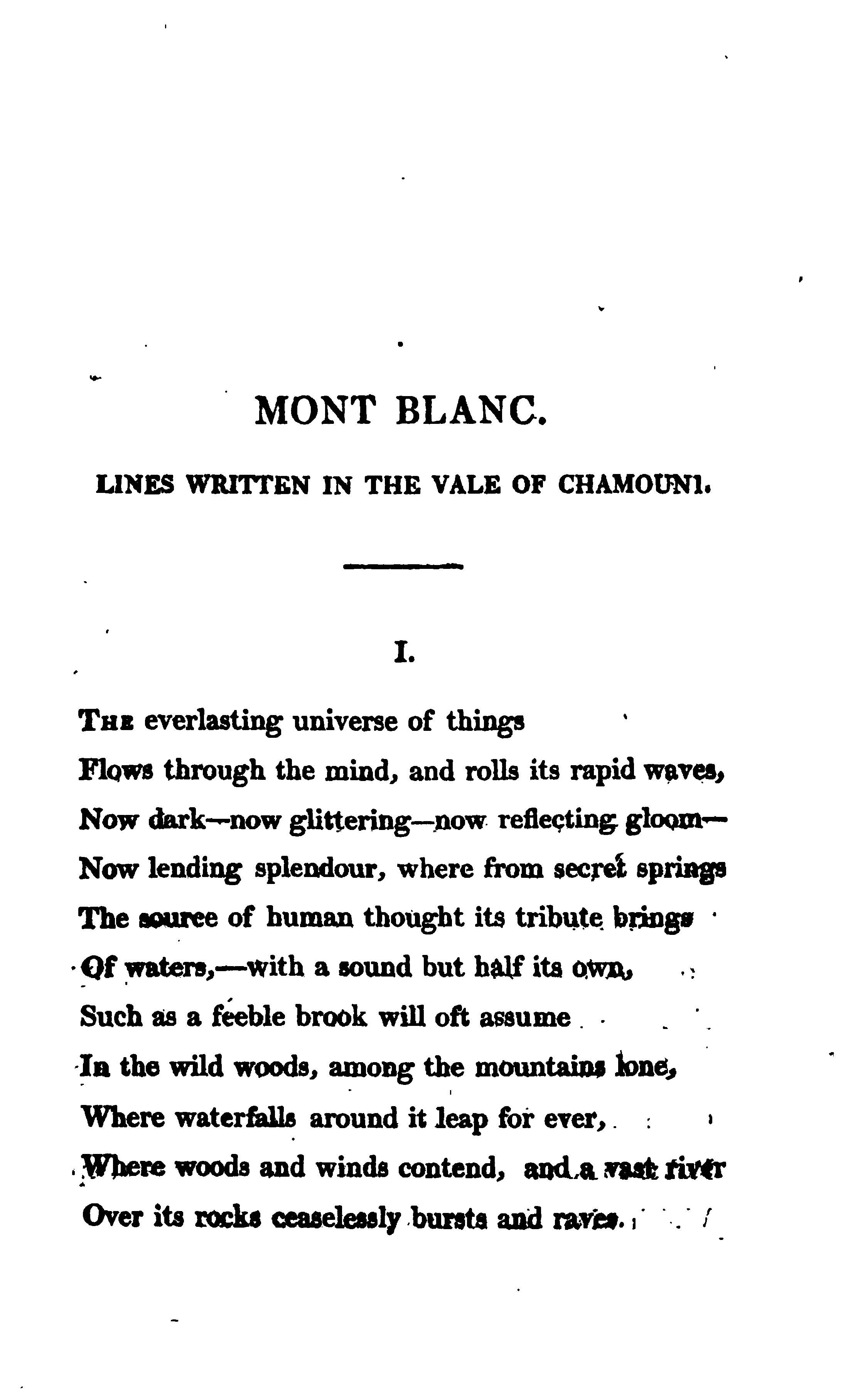
First page of Percy Bysshe Shelley's "Mont Blanc" from History of a Six Weeks' Tour

=== United Kingdom ===
- Lord Byron
  - The Lament of Tasso
  - Manfred: A dramatic poem, mostly written in 1816
- S. T. Coleridge:
  - Sibylline Leaves, including a later version of "Frost at Midnight"
  - Zapolya: A Christmas tale
- William Combe, The Dance of Life
- George Croly, Paris in 1815
- John Hookham Frere, Prospectus and Specimen of an Intended National Work by William and Robert Whistlecraft Relating to King Arthur and his Round Table [cantos i, ii]; cantos iii and iv published 1818
- Felicia Dorothea Hemans, Modern Greece
- John Keats, Poems, including Endymion
- Thomas Moore, Lalla Rookh: An oriental romance
- Charlotte Caroline Richardson
  - Waterloo, a Poem on the Late Victory
  - Isaac and Rebecca
- Walter Scott, Harold the Dauntless
- Percy Bysshe Shelley:
  - Laon and Cythna, revised as The Revolt of Islam; originally published on December 1, but suppressed; at the insistence of the publisher, Ollier, passages were removed and Shelley published the retitled, revised version (but misdated 1818)
  - Hymn to Intellectual Beauty, written in 1816, published in Leigh Hunt's Examiner on January 19 of this year
  - "Mont Blanc", published in History of a Six Weeks' Tour through a part of France, Switzerland, Germany, and Holland, a book written with his wife, Mary, who wrote most of the prose (Percy Shelley wrote the poem)
- Robert Southey, Wat Tyler: A Dramatic Poem
- Charles Wolfe, The Burial of Sir John Moore at Corunna

=== United States ===
- William Cullen Bryant, "Thanatopsis" published in the North American Review as fragments that the editors combined under the title, the first American poem to gain attention and respect from British critics; a reflection on death; influenced by reading Thomas Gray, Henry Kirke White and Robert Southey; the author was not yet 20, and many were skeptical that a young man could write the sophisticated and powerful piece
- John Neal, poetry published in The Portico volumes 3 and 4
- Robert Charles Sands, The bridal of Vaumond; A Metrical Romance, New York: James Eastburn and Co.
- The Village Songster: Containing a Selection of the Most Approved Patriotic and Comic Songs, including "He's Not Worth the Trouble" by Susanna Haswell Rowson, Haverhill, Massachusetts: "Printed by Burrill and Tileston, and sold at their bookstore", anthology

== Births ==
Death years link to the corresponding "[year] in poetry" article:

- February 4 – John McPherson (died 1845), Canadian poet
- February 21 – José Zorrilla (died 1893), Spanish Romantic poet and dramatist
- July 4 – Elizabeth Ayton Godwin (died 1889), British Victorian era hymnwriter and religious poet
- July 12 – Henry David Thoreau (died 1862), American Transcendentalist philosopher and writer
- September 14 – Theodor Storm (died 1888, German literary realist writer
- October 28 – Cornelius Mathews (died 1889), American writer in the Young America movement
- December 15 – Raffaello Carboni (died 1875), Italian revolutionary and writer, working for a time in Australia
- Also:
  - Venmani Acchen Nambudiri (died 1891), Indian, Malayalam-language poet associated with the Venmani School of poetry

== Deaths ==
Birth years link to the corresponding "[year] in poetry" article:

- May 24 – Juan Meléndez Valdés (born 1754), Spanish
- October 26 – Moritz August von Thümmel (born 1738), German
- Tarikonda Venkamamba (born 1730), Telugu (a woman)

== See also ==
- Poetry
- List of years in poetry
- List of years in literature
- 19th century in literature
- 19th century in poetry
- Romantic poetry
- Golden Age of Russian Poetry (1800–1850)
- Weimar Classicism period in Germany, commonly considered to have begun in 1788 and to have ended either in 1805, with the death of Friedrich Schiller, or 1832, with the death of Goethe
- List of poets
