= 1812 in poetry =

Nationality words link to articles with information on the nation's poetry or literature (for instance, Irish or France).

== Events ==
- January 15 – Lord Byron takes his seat in the Parliament of the United Kingdom.
- Summer – English painter J. M. W. Turner exhibits his oil Snow Storm: Hannibal and his Army Crossing the Alps in the Royal Academy summer exhibition at Somerset House, London, the first time one of his paintings is accompanied by a catalogue quotation from his poem "Fallacies of Hope". He continues to quote from it until the last year he exhibits (1850) but it probably never exists as a whole work.

== Works published ==
=== United Kingdom ===
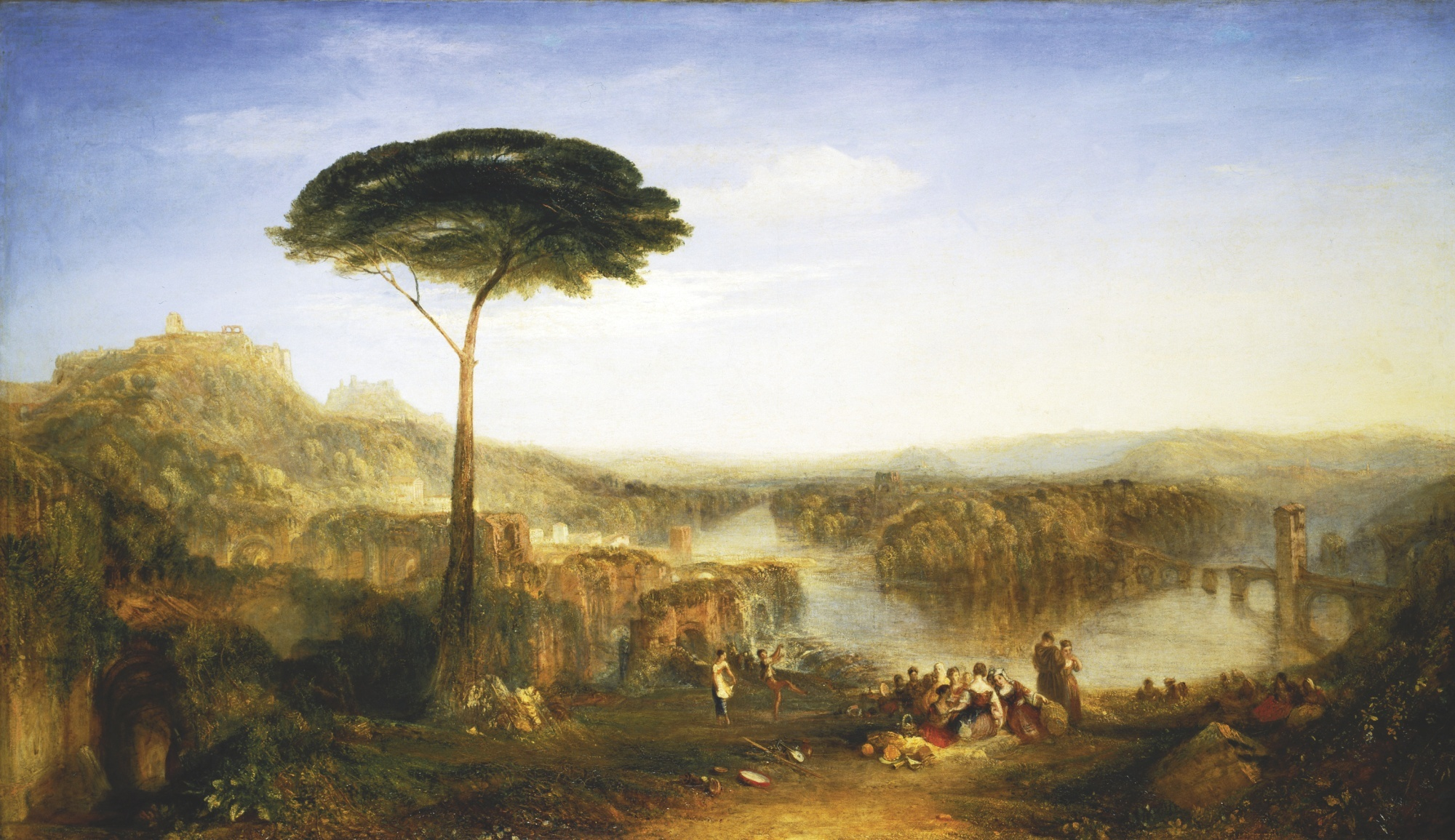
Childe Harold's Pilgrimage by J. M. W. Turner, 1823

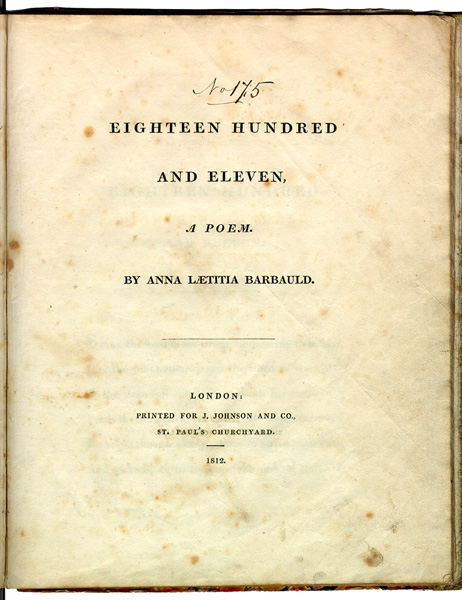
Original title page from Anna Laetitia Barbauld's Eighteen Hundred and Eleven

- Anna Laetitia Barbauld, Eighteen Hundred and Eleven, which criticises Britain's participation in the Napoleonic Wars
- Bernard Barton, Metrical Effusions' or, Verses on Various Occasions, published anonymously
- Lord Byron
  - Childe Harold's Pilgrimage, Parts I-II, on March 20, with other books published in following years, up to 1818. Fourteen shorter poems also included. The publication of these first two cantos is received with acclamation, and Byron wrote, "I awoke one morning and found myself famous." The poem describes the travels and reflections of a world-weary young man who, disillusioned with a life of pleasure and revelry, looks for distraction in foreign lands; in a wider sense, it is an expression of the melancholy and disillusionment felt by a generation weary of the wars of the post-Revolutionary and Napoleonic eras. The title comes from the term childe, a medieval title for a young man who was a candidate for knighthood.
  - The Curse of Minerva
- H. F. Cary, translator, Dante, Purgatorio and Paradiso
- William Combe, The Tour of Dr Syntax, in Search of the Picturesque, published anonymously; first published in monthly segments in 1809; The Second Tour of Doctor Syntax (1820); The Third Tour (1821); inspired various imitations, including The Tour of Doctor Syntax Through London and Doctor Syntax in Paris, both 1820
- George Crabbe, Tales
- Mary Elliott, Simple Truths in Verse, published under the author's maiden name, "Mary Belson"; for children
- Reginald Heber, Poems and Translations
- Felicia Dorothea Browne, The Domestic Affections, and Other Poems
- Walter Savage Landor, Count Julian: A tragedy
- M. G. Lewis, Poems
- Eliza Macauley, Effusions of Fancy
- Thomas Love Peacock, The Genius of the Thames, Palmyra, and Other Poems (Palmyra, 1806; The Genius of the Thames, 1810)
- Samuel Rogers, Poems by Samuel Rogers
- P. B. Shelley, The Devil's Walk, a broadside ballad on a single sheet
- James and Horace Smith, Rejected Addresses; or, The New Theatrum Poetarium, parodies, published anonymously; many editions follow, including the 18th in 1833, with a new preface by Horatio Smith; 21st edition in 1847
- William Tennant, Anster Fair, the first use of the Italian ottava rima mock-heroic style in Britain; Scottish schoolmaster poet
- John Wilson, The Isle of Palms, and Other Poems; Scottish poet

=== Other ===
- Robert Treat Paine, Jr., The Works, in Verse and Prose, of the Late Robert Treat Paine, Jun. Esq. With Notes. To which are prefixed, sketches of his life, character and writings, contains "Philenia to Menander" by Sarah Wentworth Apthorp Morton, Boston: Printed and published by J. Belcher; posthumously published, with poems in such genres as political satire, drama criticism, neoclassical verse and spiritual prose, all selected by Charles Prentiss; United States
- John Pierpont, The Portrait, a Federalist poem praising George Washington and Alexander Hamilton while denouncing Thomas Jefferson

== Births ==
Death years link to the corresponding "[year] in poetry" article:

- February 7 – Charles Dickens (died 1870), English novelist, writer, poet and playwright
- February 28 – Berthold Auerbach (died 1882), German-Jewish poet and novelist
- March – Iswarchandra Gupta (ঈশ্বরচন্দ্র গুপ্ত) (died 1859) Bengali poet and writer
- May 2 – Edward Lear (died 1888) English artist, illustrator and writer known for his literary nonsense in poetry and prose, especially his limericks, a form he popularised
- May 7 – Robert Browning (died 1899), English poet and playwright
- July 20 – Louisa Anne Meredith (died 1895), Australian
- September 24 – Mary Ann Browne (died 1845), English poet and writer of musical scores
- Also:
  - Tachibana Akemi, 橘曙覧 (died 1868), Japanese poet and classical scholar (surname: Tachibana)
  - María Josefa Mujía (died 1888), Bolivian

== Deaths ==
Birth years link to the corresponding "[year] in poetry" article:

- May 14 – Duncan Ban MacIntyre (born 1724), Scottish Gaelic poet
- November 27 (bur.) – Jane Cave (born c. 1754), Welsh
- December 26 – Joel Barlow (born 1754), American
- Werner Hans Frederik Abrahamson (born 1744), Danish
- Isaac Bickerstaffe (born 1733), Irish poet and playwright

== See also ==
- Poetry
- List of years in poetry
- List of years in literature
- 19th century in literature
- 19th century in poetry
- Romantic poetry
- Golden Age of Russian Poetry (1800–1850)
- Weimar Classicism period in Germany, commonly considered to have begun in 1788 and to have ended either in 1805, with the death of Friedrich Schiller, or 1832, with the death of Goethe
- List of poets
