= 1745 in literature =

This article contains information about the literary events and publications of 1745.

== Events ==
- February – London theatres stage competing productions of Shakespeare's King John in response to the Jacobite rising begun this summer by Bonnie Prince Charlie. David Garrick's production of the original text at Drury Lane contrasts with Colley Cibber's adaptation Papal Tyranny in the Reign of King John at Covent Garden. The rivalry anticipates "the Romeo and Juliet war" of five years later.
- September 21 – Friedrich Gottlieb Klopstock delivers a speech on epic poetry – Abschiedsrede über die epische Poesie, kultur- und literargeschichtlich erläutert – to mark his leaving school.
- October 19 – Jonathan Swift, Irish satirist and Dean of St Patrick's Cathedral, Dublin, dies aged 78. His body is laid out in public for the people of Dublin to pay their last respects, and he is buried, in accordance with his wishes, in his cathedral by Esther Johnson's side, with his own epitaph: Ubi sæva Indignatio/Ulterius/Cor lacerare nequit ("Where savage indignation can no longer lacerate the heart").
- November 17 – In Bethlehem, Pennsylvania, Bishop August Gottlieb Spangenberg of the Moravian Church asks innkeeper Samuel Powell to begin importing and distributing books, the origins of a bookstore still in existence in 2007.

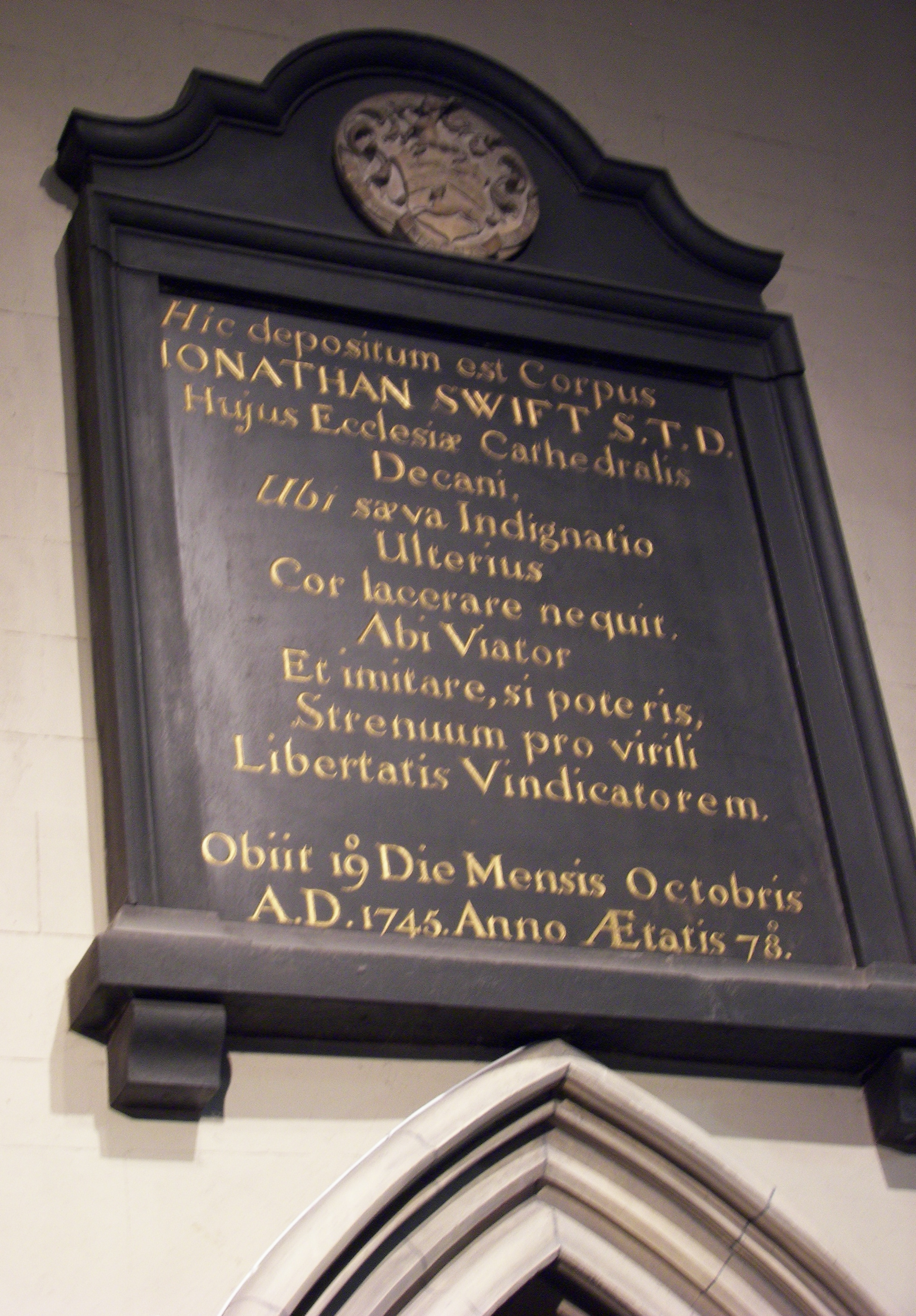
Latin epitaph for Jonathan Swift in St Patrick's Cathedral, Dublin near his burial site. Literal translation: "Here is laid the Body of Jonathan Swift, Doctor of Sacred Theology, Dean of this Cathedral Church, where savage Indignation can no longer lacerate the Heart. Go forth, Voyager, and copy, if you can, this vigorous (to the best of his ability) Champion of Liberty. He died on the 19th Day of the Month of October, A.D. 1745, in the 78th Year of his Age."

== New books ==
=== Prose ===
- Mark Akenside – Odes
- Elizabeth Boyd – The Snail: Or the Lady's Lucubrations (periodical – one vol. only published)
- John Brown – An Essay on Satire, occasion'd by the death of Mr. Pope
- Comte de Caylus – Cinq contes de fées (Five Fairy Tales)
- John Gilbert Cooper – The Power of Harmony
- Philip Doddridge – The Rise and Progress of Religion in the Soul
- Henry Fielding
  - A Serious Address to the People of Great Britain (on the Jacobite rebellion)
  - The True Patriot (periodical)
- Enrique Flórez – Mapa de todos los sitios de batallas que tuvieron los romanos en España
- Samuel Johnson
  - Miscellaneous Observations on the Tragedy of Macbeth
  - Proposals for Printing a New Edition of the Plays of William Shakespear
- Jean-Bernard, abbé Le Blanc – Lettres d'un François (Letters on the English and French Nations)
- Samuel Madden – Boulter's Monument
- Pierre de Marivaux – La Vie de Marianne (The Life of Marianne; last published section of unfinished novel)
- Moses Mendes – Henry and Blanche (trans. of Alain-René Lesage)
- Glocester Ridley – Jovi Eleutherio
- Thomas Scott – England's Danger and Duty
- Jonathan Swift (died October 19) – Directions to Servants (unfinished)
- William Thompson – Sickness

=== Drama ===
- Colley Cibber – Papal Tyranny in the Reign of King John (adapted from Shakespeare)
- Robert Dodsley – Rex et Pontifex
- Luise Gottsched – Das Testament
- Charles Jennens – Belshazzar (oratorio by Handel)
- James Miller – The Picture (adapted from Molière's Sganarelle)
- James Thomson – Tancred and Sigismunda

== Births ==
- January 4 – Johann Jakob Griesbach, German Biblical commentator (died 1812)
- February 2
  - Hannah More, English Romantic poet, religious writer and philanthropist (died 1833)
  - John Nichols, English printer and antiquary (died 1826)
- February 20 – Henry James Pye, English poet (died 1813)
- July 26 – Henry Mackenzie, Scottish novelist, writer and poet (died 1831)
- September 3 – Charles Victor de Bonstetten, Swiss liberal writer (died 1832)
- September 12 (bapt.) – Karl von Marinelli, Austrian actor and dramatist (died 1803)
- October 13 (bapt.) – William Crowe, English poet (died 1829)
- December 10 – Thomas Holcroft, English dramatist and miscellanist (died 1809)
- Probable year of birth – Olaudah Equiano, African writer (died 1797)

== Deaths ==
- Spring – William Meston, Scottish poet (born c. 1688)
- May 13 – Charles Coffey, Irish dramatist and composer
- July 11 – Pierre Desmaiseaux, exiled French biographer (born c. 1673)
- September 6 – David Wilkins, Prussian-born English orientalist (born 1685)
- October 19 – Jonathan Swift, Irish satirist (born 1667)
- November 16 – William Broome, English poet and translator (born 1689)
- December 16 – Pierre Desfontaines, French journalist and historian (born 1685)
- December 29 – Nur al-Din Nimatullah al-Jazayiri, Safavid Iranian Ja'fari jurist, linguist and writer (born 1677)

== In literature ==
- Walter Scott's novel Waverley (1814) and Robert Louis Stevenson's The Master of Ballantrae (1889) are set during the Jacobite rising of 1745.
