= 1744 in literature =

This article contains information about the literary events and publications of 1744.

== Events ==
- February 6 – Samuel Foote makes his debut as an actor as Othello at the Haymarket Theatre, London, England.
- February 15 – Spranger Barry makes his debut as an actor at the Theatre Royal, Dublin.
- April – The Female Spectator (a monthly) is founded by Eliza Haywood in England, the first periodical written for women by a woman.
- April 14 – The Physico-Historical Society is formed in Dublin for the preservation of 'manuscripts, rare printed books, and natural curiosities relating to Ireland'.
- May 29 – Alexander Pope is received into the Catholic Church, a day before his death.

== New books ==
=== Fiction ===
- Mary Collyer – Felicia to Charlotte
- Sarah Fielding – The Adventures of David Simple
- Eliza Haywood – The Fortunate Foundlings
- Edward Moore – Fables for the Female Sex
- Joseph Warton – The Enthusiast

=== Children ===
- John Newbery – A Little Pretty Pocket-Book
- Tommy Thumb's Pretty Song Book (earliest extant English nursery-rhyme collection)

=== Drama ===
- Robert Dodsley – A Select Collection of Old Plays
- William Havard – Regulus
- James Miller (died April 27)
  - Joseph and his Brethren (music by Handel)
  - Mahomet the Imposter (adapted from Voltaire's Mahomet; completed by John Hoadly)
- James Ralph – The Astrologer (adapted from Thomas Tomkis's Albumazar, itself adapted from Giambattista della Porta's L'astrologo)
- Antonio de Zamora – No hay deuda que no se pague y convidado de piedra

=== Poetry ===
- Mark Akenside
  - The Pleasures of the Imagination
  - An Epistle to Curio
- Jane Brereton – Poems
- Gabriel Álvarez de Toledo (ed. Diego de Torres Villarroel) – Obras póstumas poéticas, con la Burromaquia

=== Non-fiction ===
- John Armstrong – The Art of Preserving Health
- George Berkeley – Siris
- Pierre François Xavier de Charlevoix – Histoire et Description Generale de la Nouvelle France (History and General Description of New France)
- Émilie de Breteuil, marquise du Chatelet -Dissertation sur la nature et la propagation du feu
- Colley Cibber – Another Occasional Letter from Mr. Cibber to Mr. Pope
- David Garrick – An Essay on Acting (attrib.)
- Samuel Johnson
  - Life of Mr Richard Savage
  - An Account of the Life of John Philip Barretier
- Francis Moore – A Voyage to Georgia
- William Oldys (editor) – The Harleian Miscellany (introduction by Samuel Johnson)
- Alexander Pope – Essay on Man, volume 4: "Epistle: Of the Nature and State of Man, with Respect to" (4) "Happiness" (the first 2 epistles were written in 1732 and the third in 1733).
- John Ranby – The Method of Treating Gunshot Wounds
- Emanuel Swedenborg – The Animal Kingdom (Soul's Domain) (1744–45)
- Jonathan Swift – Three Sermons

== Births ==
- January 29 – Catharina Charlotta Swedenmarck, Swedish writer (died 1813)
- February 10 – William Mitford, English historian (died 1827)
- April 11 (baptised) – Elizabeth Bonhôte, English novelist, essayist and poet (died 1818)
- August 25 – Johann Gottfried Herder, German poet (died 1803)
- December – Elsa Fougt, Swedish editor and publisher (died 1826)

== Deaths ==
- January 28 – Thomas Innes, Scottish historian (born 1662)
- January 23 – Thomas Griffith, Irish actor and theatre manager (born 1680)
- March 31 – Antiochus Kantemir, Russian diplomat and writer (born 1708)
- April 27 – James Miller, English playwright, poet and satirist (born 1704)
- May 30 – Alexander Pope, English poet and satirist (born 1688)
- September 18 – Lewis Theobald, English literary historian (born 1688)
