= 1746 in literature =

This article contains information about the literary events and publications of 1746.

== Events ==
- May 9 – Voltaire, on being admitted into the Académie française, gives a discours de réception in which he criticizes Boileau's poetry.
- June 18 – Samuel Johnson signs a contract to compile A Dictionary of the English Language for a group of London booksellers led by Robert Dodsley at a literary breakfast.
- August 28 – A Native American massacre on this day of two white families in Deerfield, Massachusetts, gives rise to the first known poem by an African American, Lucy Terry, at the time a slave of around 16: "Bars Fight, August 28, 1746".
- October 4 – Irish actor Spranger Barry makes his London stage debut in the title role of Othello at the Theatre Royal, Drury Lane (with Charles Macklin as Iago).
- unknown dates
  - The probable first performance of Carlo Goldoni's comedy Servant of Two Masters (Italian: Il servitore di due padroni) takes place at the Teatro San Samuele in Venice.
  - The oldest manuscript of Jean de Joinville's Life of Saint Louis is rediscovered in Brussels.
  - Élie Catherine Fréron founds his controversial journal Lettres de la comtesse de...

== New books ==
=== Prose ===
- John Arbuthnot (died 1735) – Miscellanies
- John Collier as "Tim Bobbin" – A View of the Lancashire Dialect by way of dialogue between Tummus... and Meary...
- Zachary Grey – A Word or Two of Advice to William Warburton
- James Hervey – Meditations Among the Tombs
- Soame Jenyns – The Modern Fine Gentleman
- Jacques Rochette de La Morlière – Angola
- Pierre Louis Maupertuis – Astronomie nautique, volume 2
- Tobias Smollett – Advice
- Lauritz de Thurah – Den Danske Vitruvius, volume I
- John Upton – Critical Observations on Shakespeare
- Horace Walpole – The Beauties
- John Wesley
  - The Principles of a Methodist Father Explain'd
  - Sermons on Several Occasions

=== Drama ===
- Charles Macklin – Henry VII
- Pierre de Marivaux – Le Préjugé vaincu
- Takeda Izumo I, Takeda Izumo II, Namiki Sōsuke and Miyoshi Shōraku – Sugawara Denju Tenarai Kagami

=== Poetry ===
- Thomas Blacklock – Poems
- William Collins – Odes
- Thomas Cooke – A Hymn to Liberty
- Christian Fürchtegott Gellert – Fabeln und Erzählungen (Fables and Stories) (in verse)
- Joseph Warton – Odes on Various Subjects
- See also 1746 in poetry

== Births ==
- January 12 – Johann Heinrich Pestalozzi, Swiss educational reformer (died 1827)
- January 25 – Stéphanie Félicité, comtesse de Genlis, French writer, harpist, educator (died 1830)
- March 27 – Michael Bruce, Scottish poet (died 1767)
- April 3 – Jean-Baptiste Cousin de Grainville, French fantasy novelist (died 1805)
- May 3 – Radu Golescu, Wallachian statesman and literary sponsor (died 1818)
- December 21 – José de la Cruz (Huseng Sisiw), Filipino writer (died 1829)
- unknown date – Victor d'Hupay, French philosopher (died 1818)

== Deaths ==
- February 4 – Robert Blair, Scottish member of the "Graveyard poets" (born 1699)
- February 8 – Anton Josef Kirchweger, Latin Pietist author (year of birth unknown)
- May 16 – Moshe Chaim Luzzatto, Italian Jewish rabbi, kabbalist and philosopher (born 1707)
- May 22 – Thomas Southerne, Irish dramatist (born 1660)
- November 12 – Mary Leapor, English kitchenmaid poet (born 1722; died of measles)
- December 6 – Lady Grizel Baillie, Scottish poet (born 1665)
- unknown date – Frederic Count de Thoms, German biographer of King Louis XIV of France and art collector (born 1669)
