= 1751 in literature =

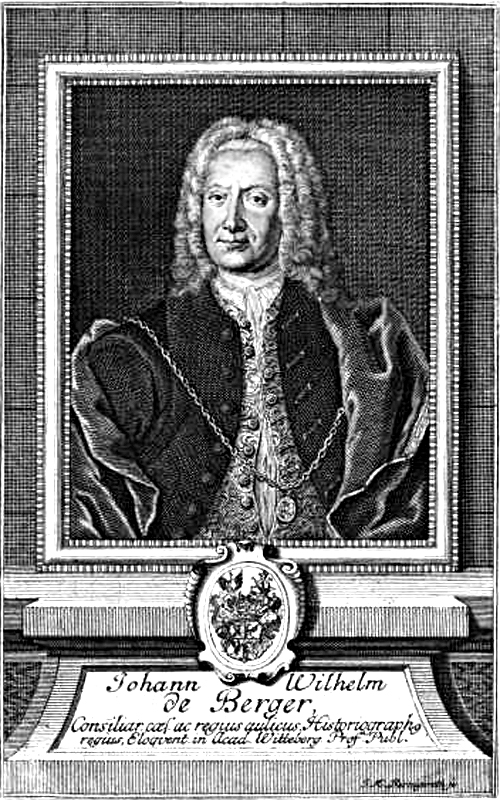
Johann Wilhelm von Berger, German philosopher and rhetorician (1672-1751)

This article contains information about the literary events and publications of 1751.

== Events ==
- May 19 – Demetrio, an opera based on lyrics by court poet Pietro Metastasio, with music by Davide Perez, is performed at Teatro San Samuele in Venice. In the same year, in Vienna, Metastasio writes the poem, Il rè pastore, later used by Wolfgang Amadeus Mozart to compose an opera seria.
- June 28 – The first volume of Denis Diderot's Encyclopédie is published.
- undated
  - The Art of Cookery Made Plain and Easy by Hannah Glasse becomes the first formally published modern cookbook in English.
  - John Smith & Son's bookshop is established in Glasgow. It will claim to be the oldest surviving bookseller in the English-speaking world.

== New books ==
=== Fiction ===
- John Cleland – Memoirs of a Coxcomb
- Francis Coventry – The History of Pompey the Little
- Henry Fielding – Amelia (published December dated 1752)
- Eliza Haywood (anonymously) – The History of Miss Betsy Thoughtless
- Robert Paltock – The Life and Adventures of Peter Wilkins, a Cornish Man
- Tobias Smollett – The Adventures of Peregrine Pickle
- Voltaire – Micromégas. Histoire philosophique

=== Drama ===
- David Mallet – Alfred (masque)
- Moses Mendes
  - Robin Hood
  - The Seasons
- Edward Moore – Gil Blas

=== Poetry ===
- Richard Owen Cambridge – The Scribleriad
- Thomas Cooke – An Ode on the Powers of Poetry
- Nathaniel Cotton – Visions in Verse
- Thomas Gray (anonymously) – Elegy Written in a Country Churchyard
- Soame Jenyns – The Modern Fine Lady
- Mary Leapor (died 1746) – Poems

=== Non-fiction ===
- John Arbuthnot (died 1735) – Miscellaneous Works
- Antoine Augustin Calmet – Traité sur les apparitions des esprits et sur les vampires ou les revenans de Hongrie, de Moravie, &c.
- Catharine Trotter Cockburn (died 1749) – The Works of Mrs. Catharine Cockburn
- John Gilbert Cooper – Cursory Remarks on Mr. Warburton's New Edition of Mr. Pope's Works
- Ignacio de Luzán – Memorias literarias de París
- Denis Diderot – Encyclopédie
- Henry Fielding – An Enquiry into the Causes of the Late Increase of Robbers
- James Harris – Hermes, a philosophical inquiry concerning universal grammar
- Henry Home, Lord Kames – Essays on the Principles of Morality and Natural Religion
- David Hume – An Enquiry Concerning the Principles of Morals
- John Jortin – Remarks on Ecclesiastical History
- Carl Linnaeus – Philosophia Botanica
- Alexander Pope (died 1744) – The Works of Alexander Pope (ed. William Warburton)
- Voltaire – The Age of Louis XIV
- John Wesley – Serious Thoughts upon the Perseverance of Saints
- Benjamin Whichcote (died 1683) – Works

== Births ==
- January 23 – Jakob Michael Reinhold Lenz, Baltic German writer (died 1792)
- January 31 – Priscilla Wakefield (née Bell), English Quaker writer and philanthropist (died 1832)
- February 20 – Johann Heinrich Voss, German poet and translator (died 1826)
- July 29 – Elisabetta Caminèr Turra, Venetian writer and translator (died 1796)
- October 9 – Pierre Louis de Lacretelle, French political writer (died 1824)
- October 30 – Richard Brinsley Sheridan, Irish dramatist and politician (died 1816)
- December 1 – Johan Henric Kellgren, Swedish poet and critic (died 1795)
- unknown dates
  - John Bowles, English political writer and lawyer (died 1819)
  - Luciano Comella, Spanish dramatist (died 1812)
- probable year
  - Helen Craik, Scottish novelist and poet (died 1825)
  - Mary Scott, English poet (died 1793)

== Deaths ==
- May 24 – William Hamilton, Scottish comic poet (born c. 1665)
- October 26 – Philip Doddridge, English nonconformist leader, educator and hymn writer (born 1702)
- October 29 – Bartholomew Green, Boston printer (born 1701)
- December 12 – Henry St John, 1st Viscount Bolingbroke, English political philosopher (born 1678)
