= Mark Akenside =

English poet and physician (1721–1770)

Mark Akenside FRS
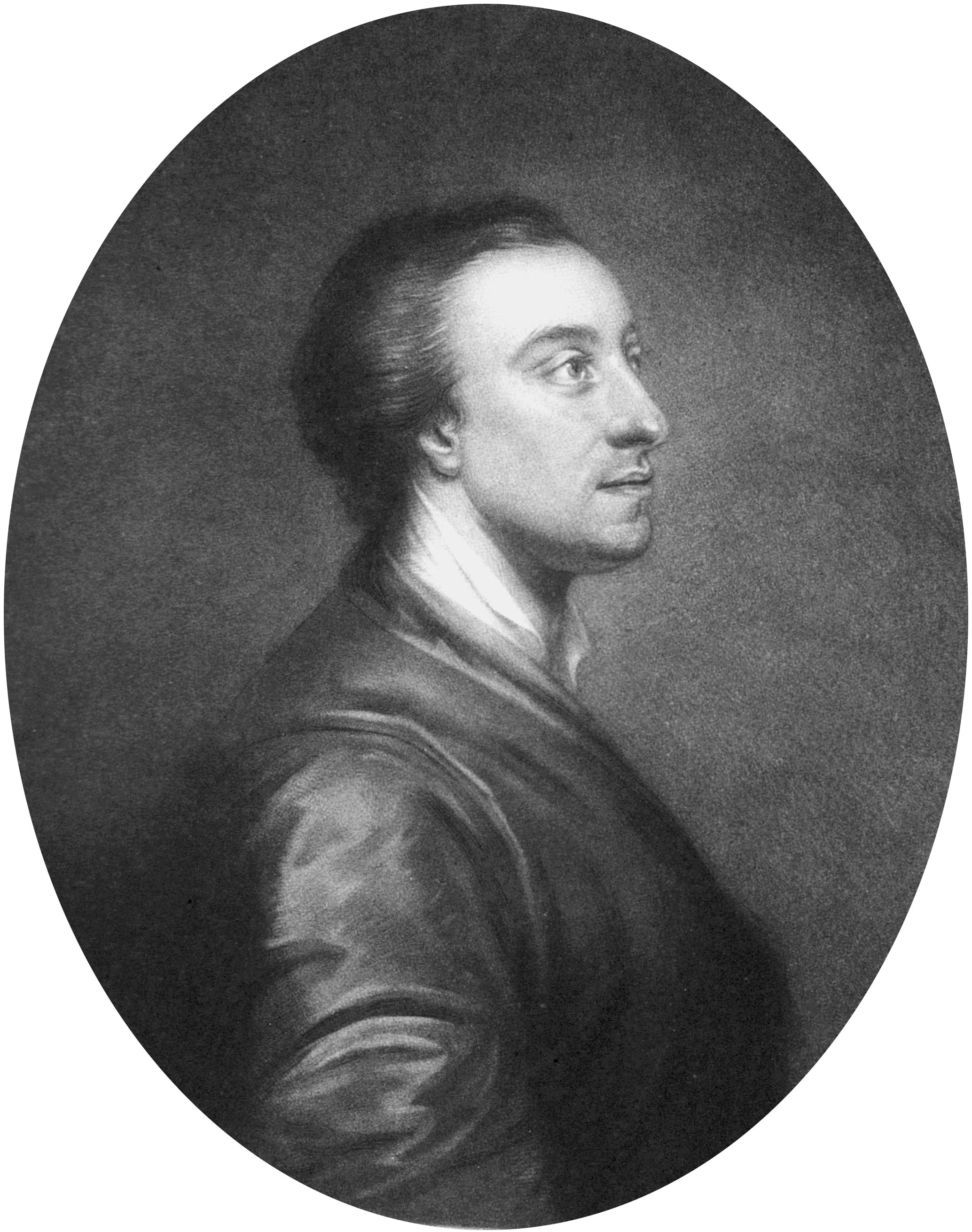
- Born: 9 November 1721; Newcastle upon Tyne, Northumberland, England
- Died: 23 June 1770 (aged 48); Old Burlington Street, London, England
- Occupations: poet, physician
- Notable work: The Pleasures of the Imagination

Mark Akenside (9 November 1721 – 23 June 1770) was an English poet and physician.

== Biography ==
Akenside was born in Butcher Bank, Newcastle upon Tyne, England, the son of a butcher. He was slightly lame all his life from a wound he received as a child from his father's cleaver. All his relations were Dissenters, and, after attending the Royal Free Grammar School of Newcastle, and a dissenting academy in the town, he was sent in 1739 to the University of Edinburgh to study theology with a view to becoming a minister, his expenses being paid from a special fund set aside by the dissenting community for the education of their pastors. He had already contributed The Virtuoso, in imitation of Spenser's style and stanza (1737) to the Gentleman's Magazine, and in 1738 A British Philippic, occasioned by the Insults of the Spaniards, and the present Preparations for War (also published separately).

After one winter as a theology student, Akenside changed to medicine as his field of study. He repaid the money that had been advanced for his theological studies, and became a deist. His politics, said Dr. Samuel Johnson, were characterized by an "impetuous eagerness to subvert and confound, with very little care what shall be established," and he is caricatured in the republican doctor of Tobias Smollett's The Adventures of Peregrine Pickle. He was elected a member of the Medical Society of Edinburgh in 1740. His ambitions already lay outside his profession, and his gifts as a speaker made him hope one day to enter Parliament. In 1740, he printed his Ode on the Winter Solstice in a small volume of poems. In 1741, he left Edinburgh for Newcastle and began to call himself surgeon, though it is doubtful whether he practised, and from the next year dates his lifelong friendship with Jeremiah Dyson (1722–1776).

During a visit to Morpeth in 1738, Akenside had the idea for his didactic poem, The Pleasures of the Imagination, which was well received and later described as 'of great beauty in its richness of description and language', and was also subsequently translated into more than one foreign language. He had already acquired a considerable literary reputation when he came to London about the end of 1743 and offered the work to Robert Dodsley for £120. Dodsley thought the price exorbitant, and only accepted the terms after submitting the manuscript to Alexander Pope, who assured him that this was "no everyday writer". The three books of this poem appeared in January 1744. His aim, Akenside tells us in the preface, was "not so much to give formal precepts, or enter into the way of direct argumentation, as, by exhibiting the most engaging prospects of nature, to enlarge and harmonize the imagination, and by that means insensibly dispose the minds of men to a similar taste and habit of thinking in religion, morals and civil life". His powers fell short of this ambition; his imagination was not brilliant enough to surmount the difficulties inherent in a poem dealing so largely with abstractions; but the work was well received. Thomas Gray wrote to Thomas Warton that it was "above the middling", but "often obscure and unintelligible and too much infected with the Hutchinson jargon".

William Warburton took offence at a note added by Akenside to the passage in the third book dealing with ridicule. Accordingly, he attacked the author of the Pleasures of the Imagination—which was published anonymously—in a scathing preface to his Remarks on Several Occasional Reflections, in answer to Dr Middleton ... (1744). This was answered, nominally by Dyson, in An Epistle to the Rev. Mr Warburton, in which Akenside probably had a hand. It was in the press when he left England in 1744 to secure a medical degree at Leiden. In little more than a month he had completed the necessary dissertation, De ortu et incremento foetus humani, and received his diploma.

Returning to England, Akenside unsuccessfully attempted to establish a practice in Northampton. In 1744, he published his Epistle to Curio, attacking William Pulteney (afterwards Earl of Bath) for having abandoned his liberal principles to become a supporter of the government, and in the next year he produced a small volume of Odes on Several Subjects, in the preface to which he lays claim to correctness and a careful study of the best models. His friend Dyson had meanwhile left the bar, and had become, by purchase, clerk to the House of Commons. Akenside had come to London and was trying to make a practice at Hampstead. Dyson took a house there, and did all he could to further his friend's interest in the neighbourhood. But Akenside's arrogance and pedantry frustrated these efforts, and Dyson then took a house for him in Bloomsbury Square, making him independent of his profession by an allowance stated to have been £300 a year, but probably greater, for it is asserted that this income enabled him to "keep a chariot", and to live "incomparably well". In 1746 he wrote his much-praised "Hymn to the Naiads", and he also became a contributor to Dodsley's Museum, or Literary and Historical Register. He was now twenty-five years old, and began to devote himself almost exclusively to his profession. He was elected a Fellow of the Royal Society in 1753.

He was an acute and learned physician. He was admitted M.D. at the University of Cambridge in 1753, fellow of the Royal College of Physicians in 1754, and fourth censor in 1755. In June 1755 he read the Gulstonian lectures before the college, in September 1756 the Croonian Lectures, and in 1759 the Harveian Oration. In January 1759 he was appointed assistant physician, and two months later principal physician to Christ's Hospital, but he was charged with harsh treatment of the poorer patients, and his unsympathetic character prevented the success to which his undeniable learning and ability entitled him. At the accession of George III both Dyson and Akenside changed their political opinions, and Akenside's conversion to Tory principles was rewarded by the appointment of physician to the queen. Dyson became secretary to the treasury, lord of the treasury, and in 1774 privy councillor and cofferer to the household.

Akenside died at his house in Burlington Street, where he had lived from 1762. His friendship with Dyson puts his character in the most amiable light. Writing to his friend so early as 1744, Akenside said that the intimacy had "the force of an additional conscience, of a new principle of religion", and there seems to have been no break in their affection. He left all his effects and his literary remains to Dyson, who issued an edition of his poems in 1772. This included the revised version of the Pleasures of Imagination, on which the author was engaged at his death.

Akenside's verse was better when it was subjected to more severe metrical rules. His odes are rarely lyrical in the strict sense, but they are dignified and often musical. By 1911 his works were little read. Edmund Gosse described him as "a sort of frozen Keats".

== Works ==
The authoritative edition of Akenside's Poetical Works is that prepared by Robin Dix (1996). An important earlier edition was prepared by Alexander Dyce (1834) for the Aldine Edition of the British Poets, and reprinted with small additions in subsequent issues of the series. See Dyce's Life of Akenside prefixed to his edition, also Johnson's Lives of the Poets, and the Life, Writings and Genius of Akenside (1832) by Charles Bucke.

== References and sources ==
Sources

- Editnotes:
- Christie, Rev James (1904). Northumberland: Its History, Its Features, and Its People (2nd ed.). Carlisle: Chas. Thurnam & Sons.
