= 1743 in literature =

This article contains information about the literary events and publications of 1743.

== Events ==
- March – Robert Dodsley advertises in the London Evening Post his plans to publish rare 16th and 17th-century plays so as to avoid them being lost.
- July 5 – A benefit performance for the elderly acting couple Henry and Elizabeth Wetherilt is held at Smock Alley Theatre in Dublin.
- August – Shortly after the death of Richard Savage, Samuel Johnson announces his intention to publish a biography of Savage.
- unknown dates
  - Johann Elias Schlegel becomes secretary to an ambassador at the Danish court.
  - A legal deposit law requires a copy of every book printed in the Grand Duchy of Tuscany to be deposited in the Magliabechiana library in Florence.

== New books ==
=== Fiction ===
- Comte de Caylus – les Contes orientaux
- William Rufus Chetwood – The Twins (prose fiction)
- Henry Fielding – The Life of Jonathan Wild the Great in Miscellanies, with A Journey from This World to the Next
- Eliza Haywood – Memoirs of an Unfortunate Young Nobleman
- Aaron Hill – The Fanciad
- Marguerite de Lubert – La Princesse Camion (Princess Camion)
- Benjamin Martin – A Course of Lectures in Natural and Experimental Philosophy, Geography, and Astronomy
- Diego de Torres Villarroel – Vida

=== Drama ===
- Thomas Cooke – Love the Cause and Cure of Grief
- Charles Simon Favart – Le Coq du village
- Henry Fielding – The Wedding-Day
- John Gay – The Distress'd Wife
- Voltaire – Mérope
- William Shakespeare (ed. Thomas Hanmer) – The Works of Shakespear

=== Poetry ===
- Robert Blair – The Grave
- Samuel Boyse – Albion's Triumph
- James Bramston (attributed) – The Crooked Six-pence
- William Collins – Verses Humbly Address'd to Sir Thomas Hanmer (related to Hanmer's edition of The Works of Shakespear)
- Philip Francis – The Odes, Epodes, and Carmen Seculare of Horace
- David Mallet – Poems on Several Occasions
- Alexander Pope – The New Dunciad (revised version)

=== Non-fiction ===
- Henry Baker – The Microscope Made Easy
- Henry St. John, 1st Viscount Bolingbroke – Remarks on the History of England (from The Craftsman)
- John Brown – Honour
- Colley Cibber
  - The Egotist; or, Colley Upon Cibber (many deprecations on Alexander Pope)
  - A Second Letter from Mr. Cibber to Mr. Pope
- Thomas Cooke – An Epistle to the Countess of Shaftesbury
- Manuel da Assumpção – Vocabolario em idioma Bengalla, e Portuguez (Vocabulary of the Bengali Language and Portuguese)
- Philip Doddridge – The Principles of the Christian Religion
- Enrique Flórez – Clave historial con que se abre la puerta a la historia eclesiástica y política (Clavis Historiae)
- Eliza Haywood – A Present for a Servant-Maid (conduct book for female servants, in the light of Richardson's Pamela)
- Richard Pococke – A Description of the East & Some Other Countries
- William Stukeley – Abury: A temple of the British Druids
- Diego de Torres Villarroel – Vida, ascendencia, nacimiento, crianza y aventuras del Doctor Don Diego de Torres Villarroel
- William Whitehead – An Essay on Ridicule

== Births ==
- January 25 – Friedrich Heinrich Jacobi, German philosopher (died 1819)
- February 14 – Jane Bowdler, English poet and essayist (died 1784)
- March 4 – Johann David Wyss, Swiss novelist writing in German (died 1818)
- March 14 – Hannah Cowley, English dramatist and poet (died 1809)
- April 13 – Thomas Jefferson, American revolutionary and president (died 1826)
- June 20 – Anna Laetitia Barbauld, English poet (died 1825)
- July 14 – Gavrila Romanovich Derzhavin, Russian lyric poet (died 1816)
- July 30 – Philip Yorke, Welsh antiquary and genealogist (died 1804)
- August 17 – Julien Louis Geoffroy, French critic (died 1814)

== Deaths ==
- April 4
  - Robert Ainsworth, English lexicographer (born 1660)
  - Daniel Neal, English historian (born 1678)
- April 29 – Charles-Irénée Castel de Saint-Pierre, French writer and thinker (born 1658)
- May 6 – Andrew Michael Ramsay, Scottish biographer (born 1686)
- August 1 – Richard Savage, English poet (born c. 1697)
- October 5 – Henry Carey, English poet, songwriter and dramatist, suicide (born 1687)
- October 15 – John Ozell, English translator (year of birth not known)
- December 22 – James Bramston, English satirical poet (born c. 1694)
