= 1743 in poetry =

This article covers 1743 in poetry. Nationality words link to articles with information on the nation's poetry or literature (for instance, Irish or France).

== Works published ==
=== United Kingdom ===
- Robert Blair, The Grave a work representative of the Graveyard poets movement
- Samuel Boyse, Albion's Triumph
- James Bramston, The Crooked Six-pence, published anonymously, attributed to Bramston by Isaac Reed in his Repository 1777; a parody of John Philips' The Splendid Shilling 1705, and that poem's text is included in this publication
- William Collins, Verses Humbly Address'd to Sir Thomas Hammer on his Edition of Shakespear's Works, published anonymously "By a Gentleman of Oxford"
- Thomas Cooke, An Epistle to the Countess of Shaftesbury
- Philip Doddridge, The Principles of the Christian Religion
- Robert Dodsley, Pain and Patience
- Philip Francis, translator, The Odes, Epodes, and Carmen Seculare of Horace, very popular translation, published this year in London (originally published in 1742 in Dublin; two more volumes, The Satires of Horace and The Epistles and Art of Poetry of Horace published 1746; see also A Poetical Translation of the Works of Horace 1747)); Irish writer published in England
- Joseph Green (poet), "The Disappointed Cooper", mocking an old man's marriage to a woman half his age and criticizing the behavior of some New Light ministers; English Colonial America
- Aaron Hill, The Fanciad: An heroic poem, published anonymously
- David Mallet, Poems on Several Occasions
- Alexander Pope, The New Dunciad
- William Whitehead, An Essay on Ridicule

=== Other ===
- André Philippe de Prétot, Le Recueil du Parnasse, ou, nouveau choix de pieces fugitives en prose & en vers, Paris: Chez Briasson, France

== Births ==
Death years link to the corresponding "[year] in poetry" article:

- March 14 – Hannah Cowley (died 1809), English dramatist and poet
- June 20 – Anna Laetitia Barbauld, (died 1825), English poet, essayist, and children's author
- November 18 – Johannes Ewald (died 1781), Danish national dramatist and poet
- December 10 – Johann Christoph Schwab (died 1821), German
- December 23 – Ippolit Bogdanovich (died 1803), Russian classicist author of light poetry, best known for his long poem Dushenka
- Approximate date – Eibhlín Dubh Ní Chonaill (died 1800), Irish noblewoman and poet, composer of the Caoineadh Airt Uí Laoghaire

== Deaths ==
Birth years link to the corresponding "[year] in poetry" article:

- May 6 – Andrew Michael Ramsay (born 1686), Scottish-born writer and poet who lived most of his adult life in France
- June 26 – Joseph Relph (born 1712), Cumberland poet
- August 1 – Richard Savage (born 1697), English poet
- October 5 – Henry Carey (born 1687), English poet, dramatist and songwriter, suicide
- December 22 – James Bramston (born 1694), English poet and satirist

== See also ==
- Poetry
- List of years in poetry
- List of years in literature
- 18th century in poetry
- 18th century in literature
- Augustan poetry
- Scriblerus Club
