= 1748 in poetry =

This article covers 1748 in poetry. Nationality words link to articles with information on the nation's poetry or literature (for instance, Irish or France).

== Works published ==
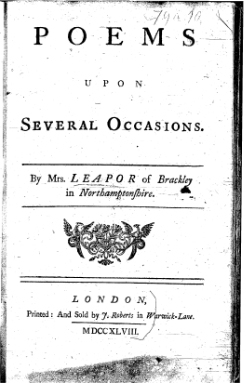
Title page of Mary Leapor's Poems

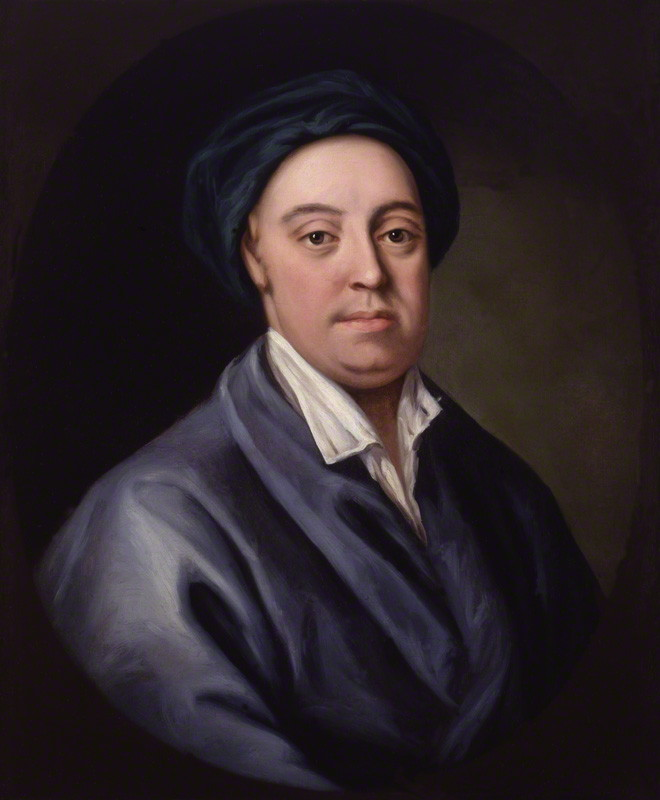
James Thomson, who published and died this year

=== United Kingdom ===
- Mark Akenside, An Ode to the Earl of Huntingdon
- Robert Dodsley, editor, first three volumes of A Collection of Poems (1748–58), Volume 2 includes Thomas Gray's "Ode [on the Spring]", "Ode on the Death of a Favourite Cat, Drowned in a Tub of Gold Fishes" and "Ode on a Distant Prospect of Eton College" (first published separately 1747)
- William Kenrick, The Town
- Mary Leapor, Poems upon Several Occasions (1748–51), posthumous
- Ambrose Philips, Pastorals, Epistles, Odes and Other Original Poems
- Thomas Sheridan, The Simile; or, Woman: a Cloud, published posthumously
- James Thomson, The Castle of Indolence: An Allegorical Poem. Written in Imitation of Spenser., a mock-Spenserian poem; published by Andrew Millar (see also "Deaths", below)
- Thomas Warton, the elder, Poems on Several Occasions, published posthumously, edited by Joseph Warton, who also included two of his own odes

=== Other ===
- Johann Jakob Bodmer, Proben der alten schwäbischen Poesie des dreyzehnten Jahrhunderts. Aus der Manessischen Sammlung, German-language anthology published in Switzerland

== Births ==
Death years link to the corresponding "[year] in poetry" article:

- January 1 (disputed — see explanation here) – Gottfried August Bürger (died 1794), German poet
- June 14 – Henry Alline (died 1784), American-born Canadian preacher and hymn-writer
- October 13 – Henry Livingston, Jr. (died 1828), American farmer and poet; his family later claim he, not Clement Moore, is the author of "The Night Before Christmas"
- December 21 – Ludwig Christoph Heinrich Hölty (died 1776), German poet and lyricist
- Also – Hugh Henry Brackenridge (died 1816), Scottish-born American writer, poet, lawyer, judge and Pennsylvania Supreme Court justice

== Deaths ==
Watts' tomb in Bunhill Fields

Death years link to the corresponding "[year] in poetry" article:

- February 21 – Antoine Danchet (born 1671), French playwright, librettist and dramatic poet
- April 13 – Christopher Pitt (born 1699), English poet and translator
- August 27 – James Thomson, 47 (born 1700), Scottish-born poet and playwright, author of the words to "Rule Britannia!"
- November 25 – Isaac Watts (born 1674), English "Father of English Hymnody"
- Also – Mohammed Awzal (born 1670), Moroccan religious Berber poet

== See also ==
- Poetry
- List of years in poetry
- List of years in literature
