= 1754 in poetry =

This article covers 1754 in poetry. Nationality words link to articles with information on the nation's poetry or literature (for instance, Irish or France).

== Works published ==
=== United Kingdom ===
- Thomas Cooke, An Ode on Poetry, Painting, and Sculpture, published anonymously
- Thomas Denton, Immortality; or, The Consolation of Human Life, published anonymously
- John Duncombe, The Feminiad: or, Female Genius, a Poem, which circulated in manuscript before being published this year (a second edition, now called The Feminead, came out in 1757). The poem celebrates virtuous learned women and was meant to encourage women to write.
- Thomas Gray, The Progress of Poesy
- Henry Jones, The Relief; or, Day Thoughts, occasioned by Edward Young's The Complaint 1742
- Jonathan Swift, The Works of Jonathan Swift, published posthumously; edited by John Hawkesworth; five more volumes were published from 1764 through 1765 and six volumes of letters from 1766 through 1768
- Thomas Warton the younger, Observations on the Faerie Queene of Spenser, criticism
- William Whitehead, Poems on Several Occasions

=== English, Colonial America ===
- John Mercer, The Dinwiddianae Poems and Prose, begins on November 4 (continues until 1757), a satiric series using puns, mock-heroics and invective attacking the policies of Virginia Governor Robert Dinwiddie and General Edward Braddock; English Colonial America
- William Shirley, The Antigonian and Bostonian Beauties: A Poem, English, Colonial America

=== Other ===
- Solomon Gessner, Daphnis, Switzerland, German-language

== Births ==
Death years link to the corresponding "[year] in poetry" article:

- March 11 – Juan Meléndez Valdés (died 1817), Spanish
- March 24 – Joel Barlow (died 1812), American poet and diplomat
- May 23 – William Drennan (died 1820), Irish
- June 18 – Anna Maria Lenngren (died 1817), Swedish
- August 27 – John Codrington Bampfylde (died 1796), English
- September 25 – Thomas Maurice (died 1824), English poet and clergyman
- December 24 – George Crabbe (died 1832), English
- Earliest likely year – Jane Cave (died 1812), Welsh

== Deaths ==
Birth years link to the corresponding "[year] in poetry" article:

- January 28 – Ludvig Holberg (born 1684), Danish/Norwegian poet and playwright
- February 1 – Elizabeth Tollet (born 1694), English
- March 25 – William Hamilton (born 1704), Scottish Jacobite
- October 28 – Friedrich von Hagedorn (born 1708), German
- Seán Clárach Mac Domhnaill (born 1691), Irish

== See also ==
- Poetry
- List of years in poetry
