= Cromek =

Cromek is a surname. Notable people with the surname include:

- Robert Cromek (1770–1812), English engraver, editor, art dealer, and entrepreneur
- Thomas Hartley Cromek (1809–1873), English artist, son of Robert

== See also ==
- Cromer (surname)
