= Chroma =

Chroma may refer to:

== Science and technology ==
- Chroma (video), the signal used in video systems to convey the color information
- Chroma, a type of colorfulness
- Chroma, a measure of color purity in the Munsell color system
- Chroma (vector database), an open-source vector database
- Chroma key, a post-production technique for compositing two images or video streams

== Arts and entertainment ==
=== Literature ===
- Chroma: A Queer Literary Journal, a UK-based journal
- Chroma, a short story collection by Frederick Barthelme
- Chroma, a book by Derek Jarman
- Chroma, a character in The Phantom Tollbooth by Norton Juster

=== Music ===
- Chroma feature, a quality of a musical pitch class
- Chroma (album), a 2005 album by Cartel
- Chroma (musician) (born 1993), Japanese musician
- Rhodes Chroma or ARP Chroma, a polyphonic synthesizer
- "Chroma", a contemporary composition by Rebecca Saunders
- St. Chroma, a song by American musician Tyler, the Creator

=== Video games ===
- Chroma, a canceled 2014 video game by Harmonix
- Chroma and Chroma Prime, playable characters from Warframe
- Chroma, a fictional city in the video game De Blob
- Chroma, a fictional supernatural force in the video game Fahrenheit
- Chroma, a profession in the video game Phantom Brave

=== Other arts ===
- Chroma (ballet), a ballet by Wayne McGregor

== Companies ==
- Chroma ATE, a Taiwanese electronics company
- EnChroma, a lens technology and eyewear company

== See also ==
- Chromatica, an album by Lady Gaga
- Croma (disambiguation)
- Cromer (disambiguation)
