= Cromers =

Cromers is the name of two unincorporated communities in the United States

- Cromers, Georgia
- Cromers, Ohio

== See also ==
- Cromer (disambiguation)
