= Elegy Written in a Country Churchyard =

1751 poem by Thomas Gray

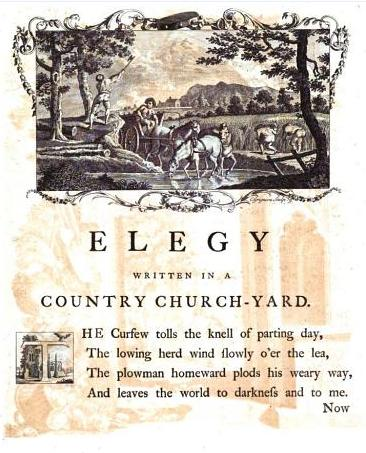
First page of Dodsley's illustrated edition of Gray's Elegy with illustration by Richard Bentley

"Elegy Written in a Country Churchyard" is a poem by Thomas Gray, completed in 1750 and first published in 1751. The poem's origins are unknown, but it was partly inspired by Gray's thoughts following the death of the poet Richard West in 1742. Originally titled Stanzas Wrote in a Country Church-Yard, the poem was completed when Gray was living near the Church of St Giles, Stoke Poges. It was sent to his friend Horace Walpole, who popularised the poem among London literary circles. Gray was eventually forced to publish the work on 15 February 1751 in order to preempt a magazine publisher from printing an unlicensed copy of the poem.

The poem is an elegy in name but not in form; it employs a style similar to that of contemporary odes, but it embodies a meditation on death, and remembrance after death. The poem argues that the remembrance can be good and bad, and the narrator finds comfort in pondering the lives of the obscure rustics buried in the churchyard. The two versions of the poem, Stanzas and Elegy, approach death differently; the first contains a stoic response to death, but the final version contains an epitaph which serves to repress the narrator's fear of dying.

The Elegy quickly became popular. It was printed many times and in a variety of formats, translated into many languages, and praised by critics even after Gray's other poetry had fallen out of favour. But while many have continued to commend its language and universal aspects, some have felt that the ending is unconvincing – failing to resolve the questions raised by the poem in a way helpful to the obscure rustic poor who form its central image.

== Background ==
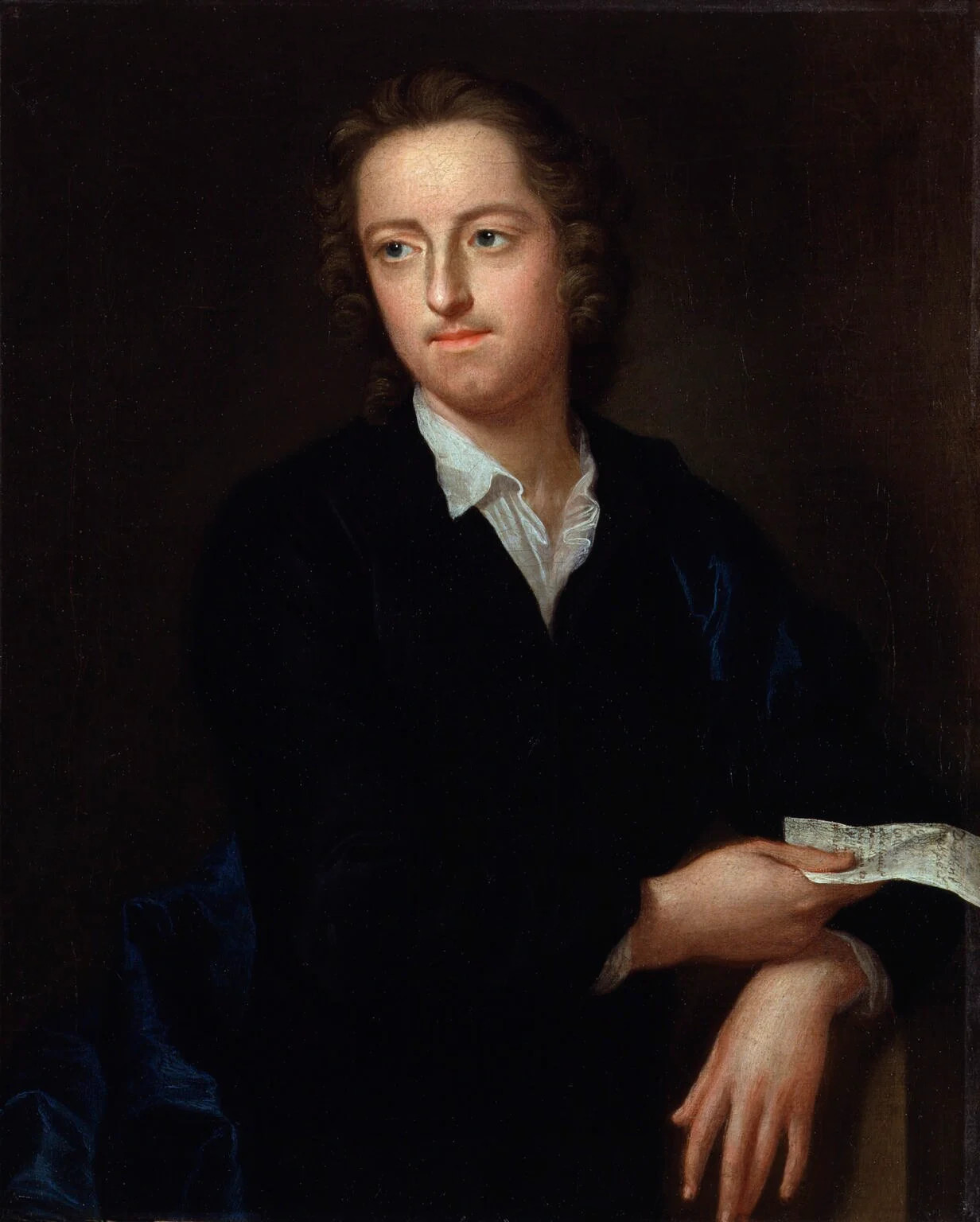
Thomas Gray, by John Giles Eccardt, 1747–48, National Portrait Gallery, London

Gray's life was surrounded by loss and death, and many people whom he knew died painfully and alone. In 1749, several events occurred that caused Gray stress. On 7 November, Mary Antrobus, Gray's aunt, died; her death devastated his family. The loss was compounded a few days later by news that his friend since childhood Horace Walpole had been almost killed by two highwaymen. Although Walpole survived and later joked about the incident, it disrupted Gray's ability to pursue his scholarship. The events dampened the mood that Christmas, and Antrobus's death was ever fresh in the minds of the Gray family. As a side effect, the events caused Gray to spend much of his time contemplating his own mortality. As he began to contemplate various aspects of mortality, he combined his desire to determine a view of order present in the classical world with aspects of his own life. With spring nearing, Gray questioned if his own life would enter into a sort of rebirth cycle or, should he die, if there would be anyone to remember him. Gray's meditations during spring 1750 turned to how individuals' reputations would survive. Eventually, Gray remembered some lines of poetry that he composed in 1742 following the death of West, a poet he knew. Using that previous material, he began to compose a poem that would serve as an answer to the various questions he was pondering.

On 3 June 1750, Gray moved to Stoke Poges, and on 12 June he completed "Elegy Written in a Country Churchyard". Immediately, he included the poem in a letter he sent to Walpole, that said:

As I live in a place where even the ordinary tattle of the town arrives not till it is stale, and which produces no events of its own, you will not desire any excuse from me for writing so seldom, especially as of all people living I know you are the least a friend to letters spun out of one's own brains, with all the toil and constraint that accompanies sentimental productions. I have been here at Stoke a few days (where I shall continue good part of the summer); and having put an end to a thing, whose beginnings you have seen long ago. I immediately send it you. You will, I hope, look upon it in light of a thing with an end to it; a merit that most of my writing have wanted, and are like to want, but which this epistle I am determined shall not want.

The letter reveals that Gray felt that the poem was unimportant, and that he did not expect it to become as popular or influential as it did. Gray dismisses its positives as merely being that he was able to complete the poem, which was probably influenced by his experience of the churchyard at Stoke Poges, where he attended the Sunday service and was able to visit the grave of Antrobus.

The version that was later published and reprinted was a 32-stanza version with the "Epitaph" conclusion. Before the final version was published, it was circulated in London society by Walpole, who ensured that it would be a popular topic of discussion throughout 1750. By February 1751, Gray received word that William Owen, the publisher of the Magazine of Magazines, would print the poem on 16 February; the copyright laws of the time did not require Gray's approval for publication. With Walpole's help, he was able to convince Robert Dodsley to print the poem on 15 February as a quarto pamphlet.

Walpole added a preface to the poem reading: "The following POEM came into my hands by Accident, if the general Approbation with which this little Piece has been spread, may be call'd by so slight a Term as Accident. It is the Approbation which makes it unnecessary for me to make any Apology but to the Author: As he cannot but feel some Satisfaction in having pleas'd so many Readers already, I flatter myself he will forgive my communicating that Pleasure to many more."

The pamphlet contained woodblock illustrations and was printed without attribution to Gray, at his request. Immediately after, Owen's magazine with Gray's poem was printed but contained multiple errors and other problems. In a 20 February letter to Walpole, Gray thanked him for intervening and helping to get a quality version of the poem published before Owen. It was so popular that it was reprinted twelve times and reproduced in many different periodicals until 1765, including in Gray's Six Poems (1753), in his Odes (1757), and in Volume IV of Dodsley's 1755 compilation of poetry. The revised version of 1768 was that later printed.

== Composition ==
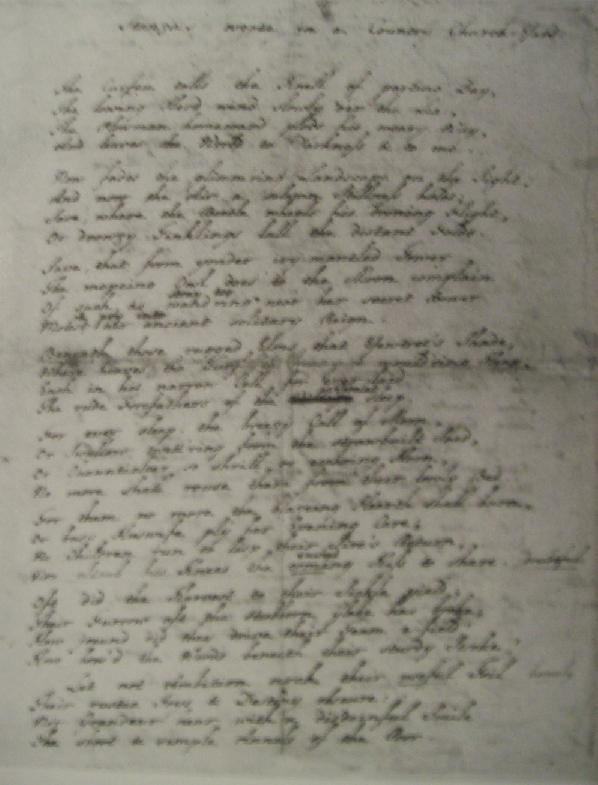
Holograph manuscript of Gray's "Stanzas Wrote in a Country Church-Yard"

The poem most likely originated in the poetry that Gray composed in 1742. William Mason, in Memoirs, discussed his friend Gray and the origins of Elegy: "I am inclined to believe that the Elegy in a Country Church-yard was begun, if not concluded, at this time [August 1742] also: Though I am aware that as it stands at present, the conclusion is of a later date; how that was originally I shall show in my notes on the poem." Mason's argument was a guess, but he argued that one of Gray's poems from the Eton Manuscript, a copy of Gray's handwritten poems owned by Eton College, was a 22-stanza rough draft of the Elegy called "Stanza's Wrote in a Country Church-Yard". The manuscript copy contained many ideas which were reworked and revised as he attempted to work out the ideas that would later form the Elegy. A later copy was entered into Gray's commonplace book and a third version, included in an 18 December 1750 letter, was sent to Thomas Wharton. The draft sent to Walpole was subsequently lost.

There are two possible ways the poem was composed. The first, Mason's concept, argues that the Eton copy was the original for the Elegy poem and was complete in itself. Later critics claimed that the original was more complete than the later version; Roger Lonsdale argued that the early version had a balance that set up the debate, and was clearer than the later version. Lonsdale also argued that the early poem fits classical models, including Virgil's Georgics and Horace's Epodes. According to Mason the early version of the poem was finished in August 1742, but there is little evidence to give such a definite date. He argued that the poem was in response to West's death, but there is little to indicate that Mason would have such information.

Instead, Walpole wrote to Mason to say: "The Churchyard was, I am persuaded, posterior to West's death at least three or four years, as you will see by my note. At least I am sure that I had the twelve or more first lines from himself above three years after that period, and it was long before he finished it."

The two did not resolve their disagreement, but Walpole did concede the matter, possibly to keep the letters between them polite. However, Gray's outline of the events provides the second possible way the poem was composed: the first lines of the poem were written some time in 1746 and he probably wrote more of the poem during the time than Walpole claimed. The letters show the likelihood of Walpole's date for the composition, as a 12 June 1750 letter from Gray to Walpole stated that Walpole was provided lines from the poem years before and the two were not on speaking terms until after 1745. The only other letter to discuss the poem was one sent to Wharton on 11 September 1746, which alludes to the poem being worked on.

== Genre ==
The poem is not a conventional part of the Classical genre of Theocritan elegy, because it does not mourn an individual. The use of "elegy" is related to the poem relying on the concept of lacrimae rerum, or disquiet regarding the human condition. The poem lacks many standard features of the elegy: an invocation, mourners, flowers, and shepherds. The theme does not emphasise loss as do other elegies, and its natural setting is not a primary component of its theme. Through the "Epitaph" at the end, it can be included in the tradition as a memorial poem, and it contains thematic elements of the elegiac genre, especially mourning. But as compared to a poem recording personal loss such as John Milton's "Lycidas", it lacks many of the ornamental aspects found in that poem. Gray's is natural, whereas Milton's is more artificially designed.

In evoking the English countryside, the poem belongs to the picturesque tradition found in John Dyer's Grongar Hill (1726), and the long line of topographical imitations it inspired. However, it diverges from this tradition in focusing on the death of a poet. Much of the poem deals with questions that were linked to Gray's own life; during the poem's composition, he was confronted with the death of others and questioned his own mortality. Although universal in its statements on life and death, the poem was grounded in Gray's feelings about his own life, and served as an epitaph for himself. As such, it falls within an old poetic tradition of poets contemplating their legacy. The poem, as an elegy, also serves to lament the death of others, including West, though at a remove. This is not to say that Gray's poem was like others of the graveyard school of poetry; instead, Gray tried to avoid a description that would evoke the horror common to other poems in the elegiac tradition. This is compounded further by the narrator trying to avoid an emotional response to death, by relying on rhetorical questions and discussing what his surroundings lack. Nevertheless, the sense of kinship with Robert Blair's "The Grave" was so generally recognised that Gray's Elegy was added to several editions of Blair's poem between 1761 and 1808, after which other works began to be included as well.

The performance is connected with the several odes that Gray also wrote and those of Joseph Warton and William Collins. The poem, as it developed from its original form, advanced from the Horatian manner and became more Miltonic. The poem actively relied on "English" techniques and language. The stanza form, quatrains with an ABAB rhyme scheme, was common to English poetry and used throughout the 16th century. The lines of each stanza are written in iambic pentameter making the poem an example of the heroic quatrain form. Any foreign diction that Gray relied on was merged with English words and phrases to give them an "English" feel. Many of the foreign words Gray adapted were previously used by Shakespeare or Milton, securing an "English" tone, and he emphasised monosyllabic words throughout his elegy to add a rustic English tone.

== Poem ==
The poem begins in a churchyard with a speaker who is describing his surroundings in vivid detail. The speaker emphasises both aural and visual sensations as he examines the area in relation to himself:

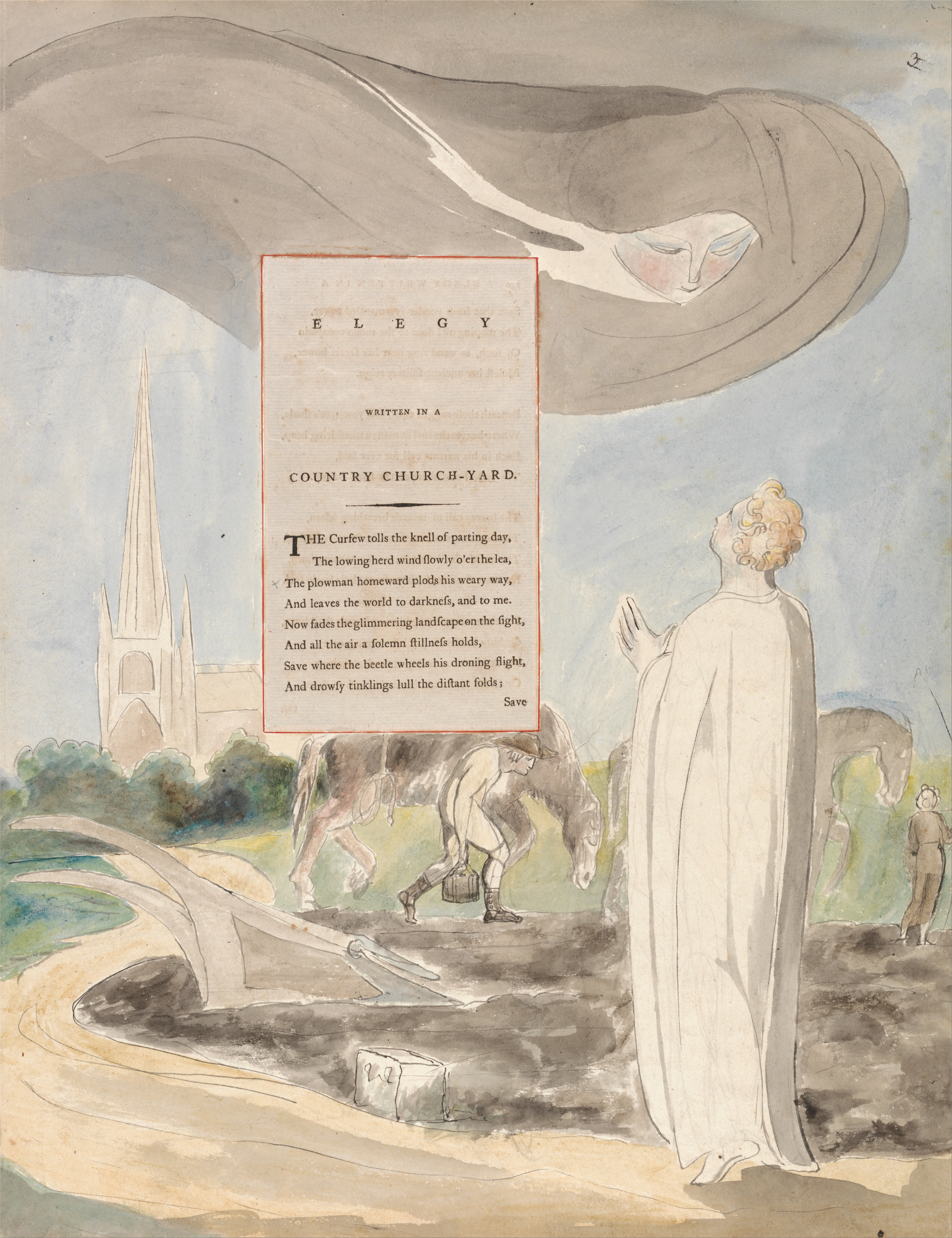
William Blake's watercolour illustration of the first stanza

The curfew tolls the knell of parting day,
The lowing herd wind slowly o'er the lea,
The ploughman homeward plods his weary way,
And leaves the world to darkness and to me.

Now fades the glimmering landscape on the sight,
And all the air a solemn stillness holds,
Save where the beetle wheels his droning flight,
And drowsy tinklings lull the distant folds:

Save that from yonder ivy-mantled tow'r
The moping owl does to the moon complain
Of such, as wand'ring near her secret bow'r,
Molest her ancient solitary reign. (lines 1–12)

As the poem continues, the speaker begins to focus less on the countryside and more on his immediate surroundings. His descriptions move from sensations to his own thoughts as he begins to emphasise what is not present in the scene; he contrasts an obscure country life with a life that is remembered. This contemplation provokes the speaker's thoughts on the natural process of wastage and unfulfilled potential.

Full many a gem of purest ray serene
The dark unfathom'd caves of ocean bear:
Full many a flower is born to blush unseen,
And waste its sweetness on the desert air.

Some village Hampden, that, with dauntless breast,
The little tyrant of his fields withstood,
Some mute inglorious Milton here may rest,
Some Cromwell guiltless of his country's blood.

Th' applause of list'ning senates to command,
The threats of pain and ruin to despise,
To scatter plenty o'er a smiling land,
And read their history in a nation's eyes,

Their lot forbade: nor circumscrib'd alone
Their growing virtues, but their crimes confined;
Forbade to wade thro' slaughter to a throne,
And shut the gates of mercy on mankind,

The struggling pangs of conscious truth to hide,
To quench the blushes of ingenuous shame,
Or heap the shrine of luxury and pride
With incense kindled at the Muse's flame. (lines 53–72)

The speaker focuses on the inequities that come from death, obscuring individuals, while he begins to resign himself to his own inevitable fate. As the poem ends, the speaker begins to deal with death in a direct manner as he discusses how humans desire to be remembered. As the speaker does so, the poem shifts and the first speaker is replaced by a second who describes the death of the first:

For thee, who, mindful of th' unhonour'd dead,
Dost in these lines their artless tale relate;
If chance, by lonely contemplation led,
Some kindred spirit shall inquire thy fate,—

Haply some hoary-headed swain may say,
"Oft have we seen him at the peep of dawn
Brushing with hasty steps the dews away,
To meet the sun upon the upland lawn. (lines 93–100)

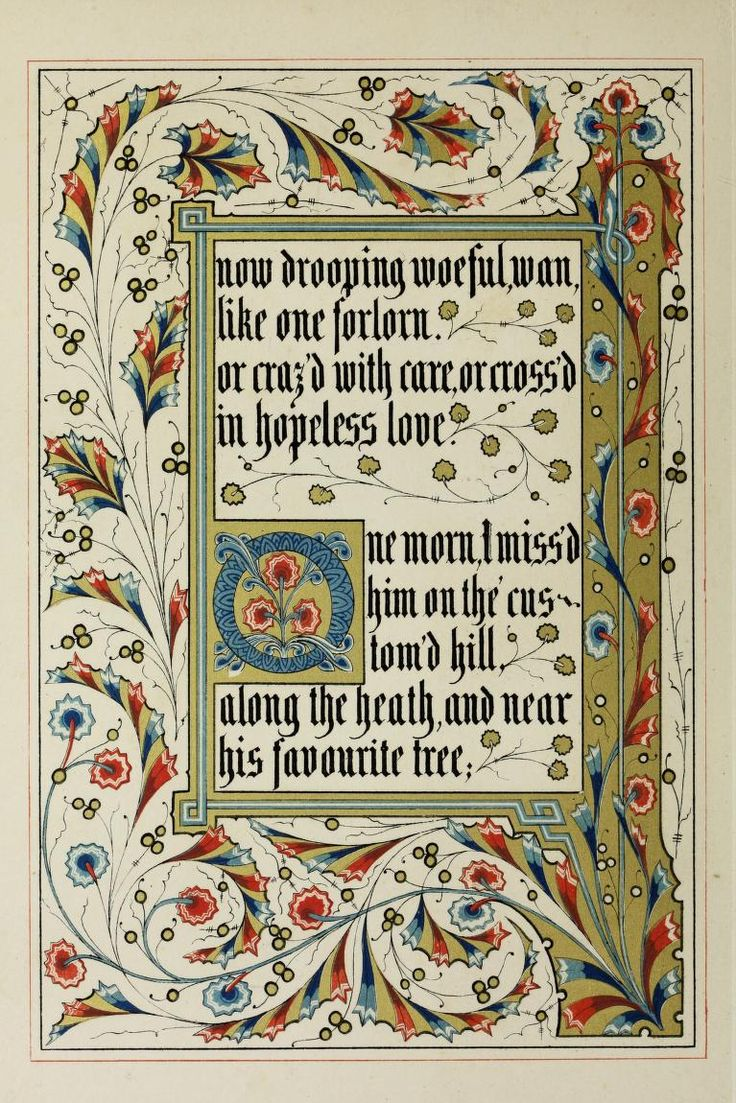
A page from the 1846 illuminated edition designed by Owen Jones

The poem concludes with a description of the poet's grave, over which the speaker is meditating, together with a description of the end of the poet's life:

There at the foot of yonder nodding beech,
That wreathes its old fantastic roots so high,
His listless length at noontide would he stretch,
And pore upon the brook that babbles by.

Hard by yon wood, now smiling as in scorn,
Mutt'ring his wayward fancies he would rove;
Now drooping, woeful-wan, like one forlorn,
Or craz'd with care, or cross'd in hopeless love.

One morn I miss'd him on the custom'd hill,
Along the heath, and near his fav'rite tree;
Another came; nor yet beside the rill,
Nor up the lawn, nor at the wood was he;

The next, with dirges due in sad array
Slow through the church-way path we saw him borne:—
Approach and read (for thou can'st read) the lay
Grav'd on the stone beneath yon aged thorn. (lines 101–116)

An epitaph is included after the conclusion of the poem. The epitaph reveals that the poet whose grave is the focus of the poem was unknown and obscure. Circumstance kept the poet from becoming something greater, and he was separated from others because he was unable to join in the common affairs of their life:

Here rests his head upon the lap of earth
A youth, to fortune and to fame unknown:
Fair science frown'd not on his humble birth,
And melancholy mark'd him for her own.

Large was his bounty, and his soul sincere,
Heaven did a recompense as largely send:
He gave to mis'ry (all he had) a tear,
He gain'd from heav'n ('twas all he wish'd) a friend.

No farther seek his merits to disclose,
Or draw his frailties from their dread abode,
(There they alike in trembling hope repose,)
The bosom of his Father and his God.

The original conclusion from the earlier version of the poem (lines 73–88) confronts the reader with the inevitable prospect of death and advises resignation, which differs from the indirect, third-person description in the final version:

The thoughtless world to majesty may bow,
Exalt the brave, and idolize success;
But more to innocence their safety owe,
Than pow'r or genius e'er conspir'd to bless

And thou who, mindful of th' unhonour'd dead
Dost in these notes their artless tale relate,
By night and lonely contemplation led
To wander in the gloomy walks of fate:

Hark! how the sacred calm, that breathes around,
Bids every fierce tumultuous passion cease;
In still small accents whisp'ring from the ground,
A grateful earnest of eternal peace.

No more, with reason and thyself at strife,
Give anxious cares and endless wishes room;
But through the cool sequester'd vale of life
Pursue the silent tenour of thy doom.

== Themes ==
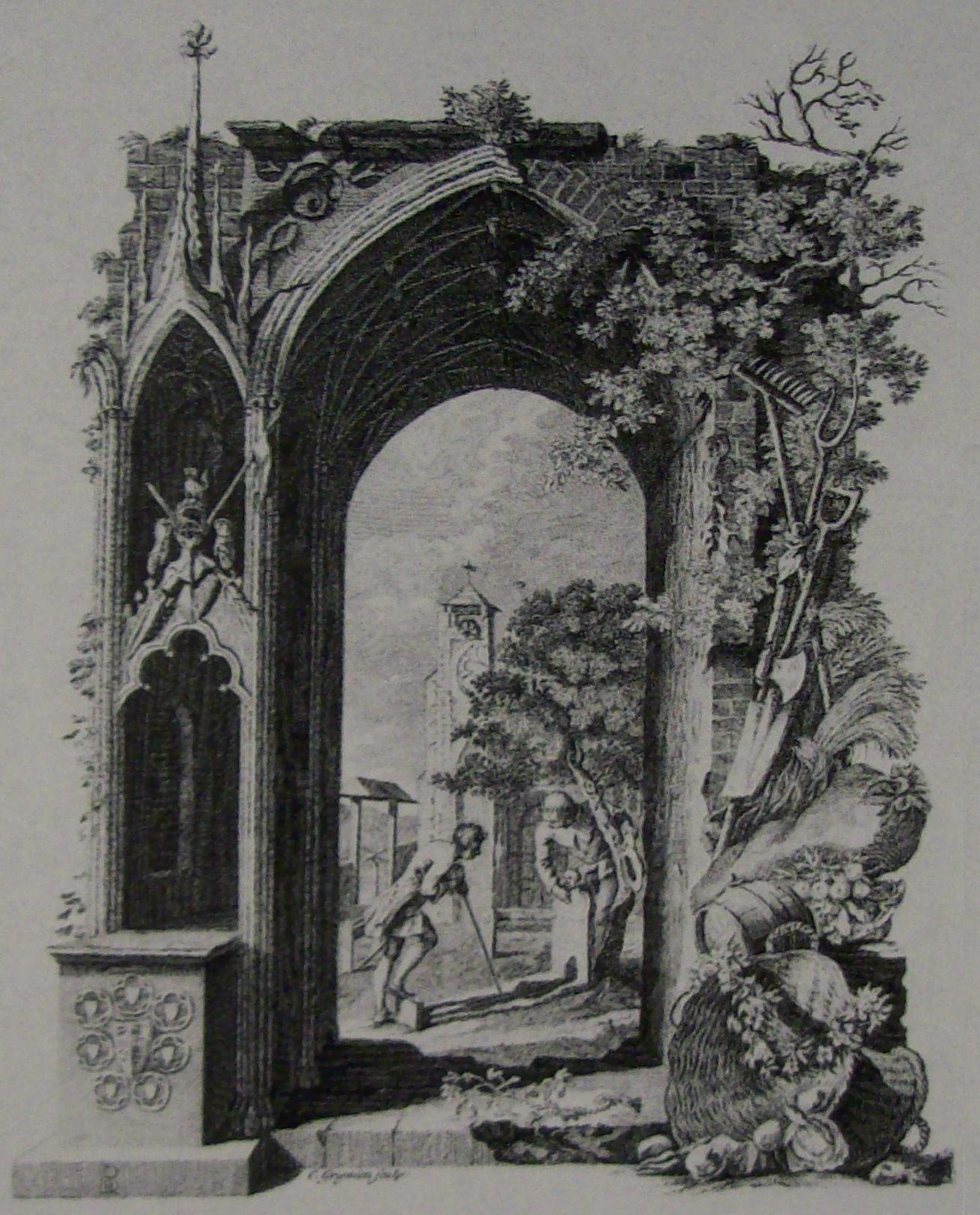
Frontispiece to 1753 edition of Elegy by Bentley

The poem connects with many earlier British poems that contemplate death and seek to make it more familiar and tame, including Jonathan Swift's satirical Verses on the Death of Dr. Swift. However, when compared to other works by the so-called Graveyard poets, such as Blair's The Grave (1743), Gray's poem has less emphasis on common images found there. His description of the moon, birds and trees dispels the horror found in them, and he largely avoids mentioning the word "grave", instead using euphemisms.

There is a difference in tone between the two versions of the elegy; the early one ends with an emphasis on the narrator joining with the obscure common man, while the later version ends with an emphasis on how it is natural for humans to want to be known. The later ending also explores the narrator's own death, whereas the earlier version serves as a Christian consolation regarding death.

The first version of the elegy is among the few early poems composed by Gray in English, including "Sonnet on the Death of Richard West", his "Eton Ode", and his "Ode to Adversity". All four contain Gray's meditations on mortality that were inspired by West's death. The later version of the poem keeps the stoic resignation regarding death, for the narrator still accepts death. The poem concludes with an epitaph, which reinforces Gray's indirect and reticent manner of writing. Although the ending reveals the narrator's repression of feelings surrounding his inevitable fate, it is optimistic. The epitaph describes faith in a "trembling hope" that he cannot know while alive.

In describing the narrator's analysis of his surroundings, Gray employed John Locke's philosophy of the sensations, which argued that the senses were the origin of ideas. Information described in the beginning of the poem is reused by the narrator as he contemplates life near the end. The description of death and obscurity adopts Locke's political philosophy as it emphasises the inevitability and finality of death. The end of the poem is connected to Locke's An Essay Concerning Human Understanding in that the beginning of the poem deals with the senses and the ending describes how we are limited in our ability to understand the world. The poem takes the ideas and transforms them into a discussion of blissful ignorance by adopting Locke's resolution to be content with our limited understanding. Unlike Locke, the narrator of the poem knows that he is unable to fathom the universe, but still questions the matter.

On the difference between the obscure and the renowned in the poem, scholar Lord David Cecil argued: "Death, he perceives, dwarfs human differences. There is not much to choose between the great and the humble, once they are in the grave. It may be that there never was; it may be that in the obscure graveyard lie those who but for circumstance would have been as famous as Milton and Hampden." However, death is not completely democratic because "if circumstances prevented them from achieving great fame, circumstances also saved them from committing great crimes. Yet there is a special pathos in these obscure tombs; the crude inscriptions on the clumsy monuments are so poignant a reminder of the vain longing of all men, however humble, to be loved and to be remembered."

The poem ends with the narrator turning towards his own fate, accepting his life and accomplishments. The poem, like many of Gray's, incorporates a narrator who is contemplating his position in a transient world that is mysterious and tragic. Although the comparison between obscurity and renown is commonly seen as universal and not within a specific context with a specific political message, there are political ramifications for Gray's choices. Both John Milton and John Hampden spent time near the setting of Stoke Poges, which was also affected by the English Civil War. The poem's composition could also have been prompted by the entrance of Prince William, Duke of Cumberland into London or by a trial of Jacobite nobility in 1746.

Many scholars, including Lonsdale, believe that the poem's message is too universal to require a specific event or place for inspiration, but Gray's letters suggest that there were historical influences in its composition. In particular, it is possible that Gray was interested in debates over the treatment of the poor, and that he supported the political structure of his day, which was to support the poor who worked but look down on those that refused to. However, Gray's message is incomplete, because he ignored the poor's past rebellions and struggles. The poem ignores politics to focus on various comparisons between a rural and urban life in a psychological manner. The argument between living a rural life or urban life lets Gray discuss questions that answer how he should live his own life, but the conclusion of the poem does not resolve the debate as the narrator is able to recreate himself in a manner that reconciles both types of life while arguing that poetry is capable of preserving those who have died. It is probable that Gray wanted to promote the hard work of the poor but to do nothing to change their social position. Instead of making claims of economic injustice, Gray accommodates differing political views. This is furthered by the ambiguity in many of the poem's lines, including the statement "Some Cromwell guiltless of his country's blood" that could be read either as Oliver Cromwell being guiltless for violence during the English Civil War or merely as villagers being compared to the guilty Cromwell. The poem's primary message is to promote the idea of "Englishness", and the pastoral English countryside. The earlier version lacks many of the later version's English aspects, especially as Gray replaced many classical figures with English ones: Cato the Younger by Hampden, Tully by Milton, and Julius Caesar by Cromwell.

== Influence ==
The "Elegy" gained wide popularity almost immediately on its first publication and by the mid-twentieth century was still considered one of the best known English poems, although its status in this respect has probably declined since then. It has had several kinds of influence.

=== Poetic parallels ===
In choosing an "English" over a Classical setting, Gray provided a model for later poets wishing to describe England and the English countryside during the second half of the 18th century. Once Gray had set the example, any occasion would do to give a sense of the effects of time in a landscape, as for instance in the passage of the seasons as described in John Scott's Four Elegies, descriptive and moral (1757). Other imitations, though avoiding overt verbal parallels, chose similar backgrounds to signal their parentage. One favourite theme was a meditation among ruins, such as John Langhorne's Written among the ruins of Pontefract Castle (1756), Edward Moore's "An elegy, written among the ruins of a nobleman's seat in Cornwall" (1756) and John Cunningham's "An elegy on a pile of ruins" (1761). Gray's friend William Mason chose an actual churchyard in south Wales for his Elegy VI (1787), adding a reference to the poet in the text. He also provided a final note explaining that the poem was written "to make it appear a day scene, and as such to contrast it with the twilight scene of my excellent Friend's Elegy".

A kinship between Gray's Elegy and Oliver Goldsmith's The Deserted Village has been recognised, although the latter was more openly political in its treatment of the rural poor and used heroic couplets, where the elegist poets kept to cross-rhymed quatrains. At first it was collected in various editions along with Gray's poem and other topographical works, but from 1873 a number of editions appeared which contained just the Elegy and The Deserted Village, though sometimes with the inclusion of Goldsmith's The Traveller or some other single work as well. At that period an anonymous review in The Academy (12 December 1896) claimed that "Gray's 'Elegy' and Goldsmith's 'The Deserted Village' shine forth as the two human poems in a century of artifice."

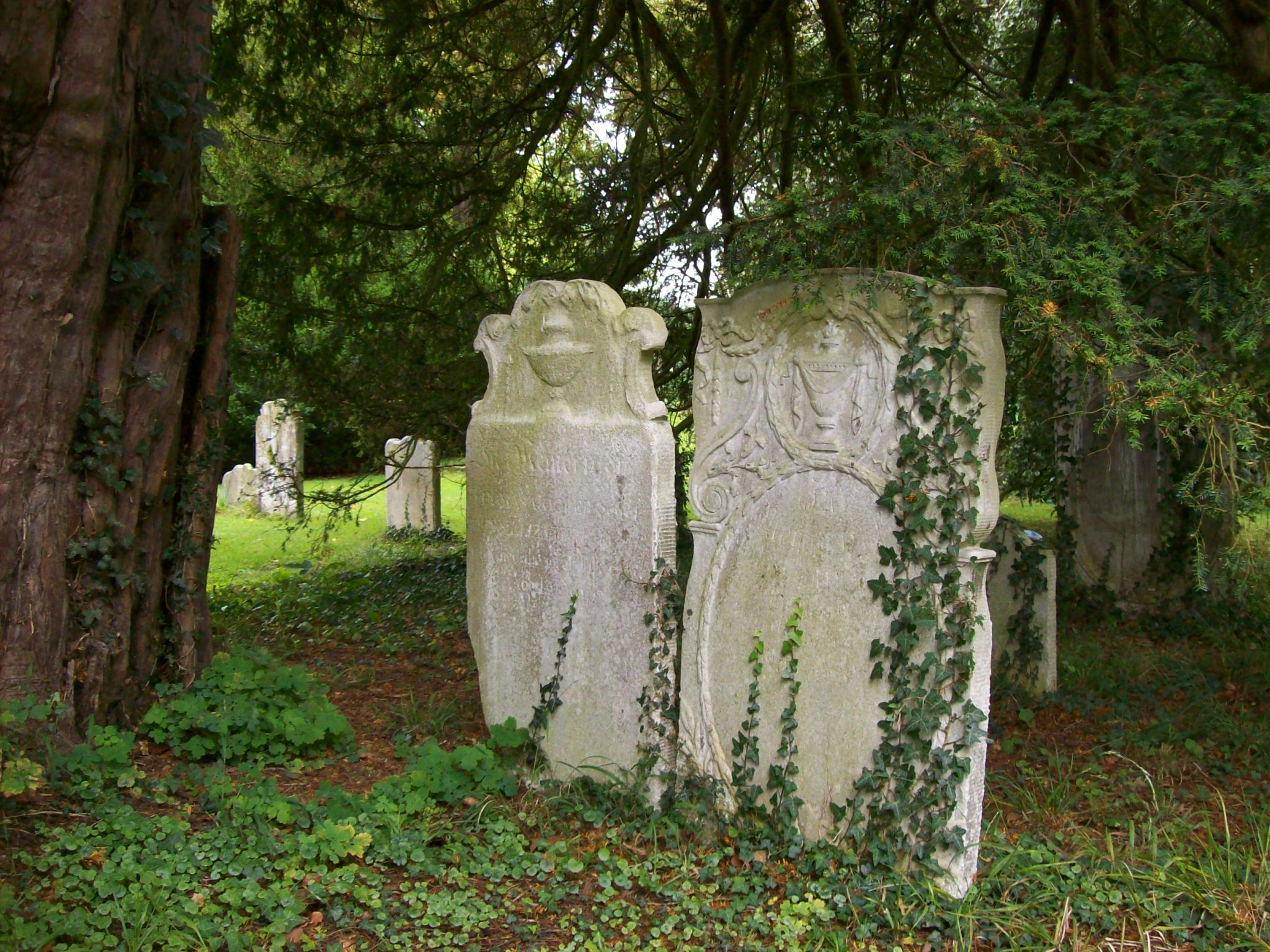
18th century tombs "beneath the yew tree's shade" in St Giles' churchyard

The Elegy's continued influence in the 19th century provoked a response from the Romantic poets, who often attempted to define their own beliefs in reaction to Gray's. Percy Bysshe Shelley, for example, who as a schoolboy was given the exercise of translating part of the Elegy into Latin, eventually wrote his own meditation among the graves in 1815. His "A Summer Evening Churchyard, Lechlade, Gloucestershire" is metrically more inventive and written in a six-line stanza that terminates Gray's cross-rhymed quatrain with a couplet. In theme and tendency Shelley's poem closely resembles the setting of the Elegy but concludes that there is something appealing in death that frees it of terror.

In the Victorian period, Alfred, Lord Tennyson adopted many features of the Elegy in his own extended meditation on death, In Memoriam. He established a ceremonial, almost religious, tone by reusing the idea of the "knell" that "tolls" to mark the coming night. This is followed with the poet narrator looking through letters of his deceased friend, echoing Gray's narrator reading the tombstones to connect to the dead. Robert Browning relied on a similar setting to the Elegy in his pastoral poem "Love Among the Ruins" which describes the desire for glory and how everything ends in death. Unlike Gray, Browning adds a female figure and argues that nothing but love matters. Thomas Hardy, who had memorised Gray's poem, took the title of his fourth novel, Far from the Madding Crowd, from a line in it. In addition, many in his Wessex Poems and Other Verses (1898) contain a graveyard theme and take a similar stance to Gray, and its frontispiece depicts a graveyard.

It is also possible that parts of T. S. Eliot's Four Quartets are derived from the Elegy, although Eliot believed that Gray's diction, along with 18th-century poetic diction in general, was restrictive and limited. But the Four Quartets cover many of the same views, and Eliot's village is similar to Gray's hamlet. There are many echoes of Gray's language throughout the Four Quartets; both poems rely on the yew tree as an image and use the word "twittering", which was uncommon at the time. Each of Eliot's four poems has parallels to Gray's poem, but "Little Gidding" is deeply indebted to the Elegy's meditation on a "neglected spot". Of the similarities between the poems, it is Eliot's reuse of Gray's image of "stillness" that forms the strongest parallel, an image that is essential to the poem's arguments on mortality and society.

=== Adaptations and parodies ===
On the basis of some 2000 examples, one commentator has argued that "Gray's Elegy has probably inspired more adaptations than any other poem in the language". It has also been suggested that parody acts as a kind of translation into the same tongue as the original, something that the printing history of some examples seems to confirm. One of the earliest, John Duncombe's "An evening contemplation in a college" (1753), frequently reprinted to the end of the 18th century, was included alongside translations of the Elegy into Latin and Italian in the 1768 and 1775 Dublin editions and 1768 Cork edition of Gray's works. In the case of the American The Political Passing Bell: An Elegy. Written in a Country Meeting House, April 1789; Parodized from Gray for the Entertainment of Those Who Laugh at All Parties by George Richards (d.1804) and published from Boston MA, the parody was printed opposite Gray's original page by page, making the translation to the political context more obvious.

A shift in context was the obvious starting point in many of these works and, where sufficiently original, contributed to the author's own literary fortunes. This was the case with Edward Jerningham's The Nunnery: an elegy in imitation of the Elegy in a Churchyard, published in 1762. Profiting by its success, Jerningham followed it up in successive years with other poems on the theme of nuns, in which the connection with Gray's work, though less close, was maintained in theme, form and emotional tone: The Magdalens: An Elegy (1763); The Nun: an elegy (1764); and "An Elegy Written Among the Ruins of an Abbey" (1765), which is derivative of the earlier poems on ruins by Moore and Cunningham. At the opposite extreme, Gray's poem provided a format for a surprising number that purport to be personal descriptions of life in gaol, starting with An elegy in imitation of Gray, written in the King's Bench Prison by a minor (London 1790), which is close in title to William Thomas Moncrieff's later "Prison Thoughts: An elegy, written in the King's Bench Prison", dating from 1816 and printed in 1821. In 1809, H. P. Houghton wrote An evening's contemplation in a French prison, being a humble imitation of Gray's Elegy while he was a prisoner at Arras during the Napoleonic wars (London 1809). It was followed next year by the bitter Elegy in Newgate, published in The Satirist in the character of the recently imprisoned William Cobbett.

An obvious distinction can be made between imitations meant to stand as independent works within the elegiac genre, not all of which followed Gray's wording closely, and those with a humorous or satirical purpose. The latter filled the columns in newspapers and comic magazines for the next century and a half. In 1884 some eighty of them were quoted in full or in part in Walter Hamilton's Parodies of the works of English and American authors (London 1884), more than those of any other work and further evidence of the poem's abiding influence. One example uncollected there was the ingenious double parody of J. C. Squire, "If Gray had had to write his Elegy in the Cemetery of Spoon River instead of in that of Stoke Poges". This was an example of how later parodies shifted their critical aim, in this case "explicitly calling attention to the formal and thematic ties which connected the 18th century work with its 20th century derivation" in Edgar Lee Masters' work. Ambrose Bierce used parody of the poem for the same critical purpose in his definition of Elegy in The Devil's Dictionary, ending with the dismissive lines

he wise man homeward plods; I only stay
To fiddle-faddle in a minor key.

=== Translations ===
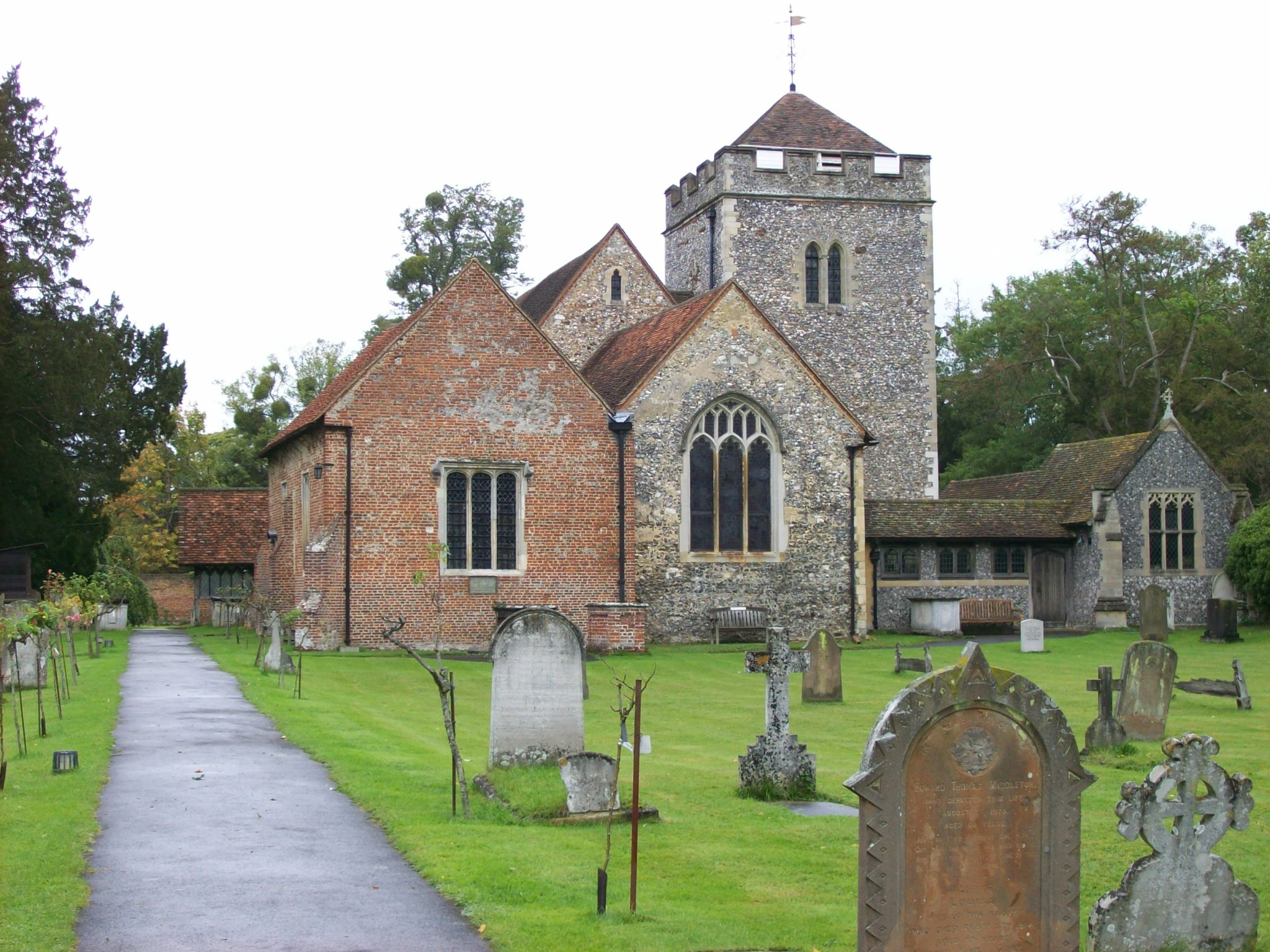
St Giles' churchyard; Gray's tomb is at the foot of the brick-built extension on the left

While parody sometimes served as a special kind of translation, some translations returned the compliment by providing a parodic version of the Elegy in their endeavour to accord to the current poetic style in the host language. An extreme example was provided by the classicised French imitation by the Latin scholar John Roberts in 1875. In place of the plain English of Gray's "And all that beauty, all that wealth e'er gave", he substituted the Parnassian Tous les dons de Plutus, tous les dons de Cythère (All the gifts of Plutus and of Cytherea) and kept this up throughout the poem in a performance that its English reviewer noted as bearing only the thinnest relation to the original.

The latest database of translations of the Elegy, amongst which the above version figures, records over 260 in some forty languages. As well as the principal European languages and some of the minor such as Welsh, Breton and Icelandic, they include several in Asian languages as well. Through the medium of these, Romanticism was brought to the host literatures in Europe. In Asia they provided an alternative to tradition-bound native approaches and were identified as an avenue to modernism. Study of the translations, and especially those produced soon after the poem was written, has highlighted some of the difficulties that the text presents. These include ambiguities of word order and the fact that certain languages do not allow the understated way in which Gray indicates that the poem is a personalised statement in the final line of the first stanza, "And leaves the world to darkness and to me".

Some of these problems disappeared when that translation was into Classical Latin, only to be replaced by others that Gray himself raised in correspondence with Christopher Anstey, one of the first of his translators into Latin.

"Every language has its idiom, not only of words and phrases, but of customs and manners, which cannot be represented in the tongue of another nation, especially of a nation so distant in time and place, without constraint and difficulty; of this sort, in the present instance, are the curfew bell, the Gothic Church, with its monuments, organs and anthems, the texts of Scripture, etc. There are certain images, which, though drawn from common nature, and everywhere obvious, yet strike us as foreign to the turn and genius of Latin verse; the beetle that flies in the evening, to a Roman, I guess, would have appeared too mean an object for poetry."

Anstey did not agree that Latin was as unpliable as Gray suggests and had no difficulty in finding ways of including all these references, although other Latin translators found different solutions, especially in regard to inclusion of the beetle. He similarly ignored Gray's suggestion in the same letter, referring back to his own alternative versions in earlier drafts of his poem: "Might not the English characters here be romanized? Virgil is just as good as Milton, and Cæsar as Cromwell, but who shall be Hampden?" Again, however, other Latin translators, especially those from outside Britain, found Gray's suggested alternative more appealing.

One other point, already mentioned, was how to deal with the problem of rendering the poem's fourth line. Gray remarked to Anstey, "'That leaves the world to darkness and to me' is good English, but has not the turn of a Latin phrase, and therefore, I believe, you were in the right to drop it." In fact, all that Anstey had dropped was reproducing an example of zeugma with a respectable Classical history, but only in favour of replicating the same understated introduction of the narrator into the scene: et solus sub nocte relinquor (and I alone am left under the night). Some other translators, with other priorities, found elegant means to render the original turn of speech exactly.

In the same year that Anstey (and his friend William Hayward Roberts) were working on their Elegia Scripta in Coemeterio Rustico, Latine reddita (1762), another Latin version was published by Robert Lloyd with the title Carmen Elegiacum. Both were subsequently included in Irish collections of Gray's poems, accompanied not only by John Duncombe's "Evening Contemplation", as noted earlier, but in the 1775 Dublin edition by translations from Italian sources as well. These included another Latin translation by Giovanni Costa (1737–1816) and two into Italian by Abbate Crocci and Giuseppe Gennari (1721–1800). The pattern of including translations and imitations together continued into the 19th century with an 1806 bilingual edition in which a translation into French verse, signed simply L.D., appeared facing the English original page by page. However, the bulk of the book was made up of four English parodies. Duncombe's "Evening contemplation" was preceded by a parody of itself, "Nocturnal contemplations in Barham Down's Camp", which is filled, like Duncombe's poem, with drunken roisterers disturbing the silence. Also included were Jerningham's "The Nunnery" and J.T.R's "Nightly thoughts in the Temple", the latter set in the gated lawyer's quarter in London.

Trilingual editions without such imitations were also appearing both in Britain and abroad. Gray's Elegy in English, French and Latin was published from Croydon in 1788. The French author there was Pierre Guédon de Berchère (1746–1832) and the Latin translator (like Gray and Anstey, a Cambridge graduate) was Gilbert Wakefield. In 1793 there was an Italian edition of the translation in rhymed quatrains by Giuseppe Torelli (1721–81) which had first appeared in 1776. This was printed facing Gray's original and was succeeded by Melchiorre Cesarotti's translation in blank verse and Giovanni Costa's in Latin, both of which dated from 1772. A French publication ingeniously followed suit by including the Elegy in an 1816 guide to the Père Lachaise Cemetery, accompanied by Torelli's Italian translation and Pierre-Joseph Charrin's free Le Cimetière de village.

Such publications were followed by multilingual collections, of which the most ambitious was Alessandro Torri's L'elegia di Tommaso Gray sopra un cimitero di campagna tradotta dall'inglese in più lingue con varie cose finora inedite (Verona 1819). This included four translations into Latin, of which one was Christopher Anstey's and another was Costa's; eight into Italian, where versions in prose and terza rima accompanied those already mentioned by Torelli and Cesarotti; two in French, two in German and one each in Greek and Hebrew. Even more translations were eventually added in the new edition of 1843. By that time, too, John Martin's illustrated edition of 1839 had appeared with translations into Latin, Greek, German, Italian and French, of which only the Torelli version had appeared in previous collections. What we learn from all this activity is that, as the centenary of its first publication approached, interest in Gray's Elegy continued unabated in Europe and new translations of it continued to be made.

=== Other media ===
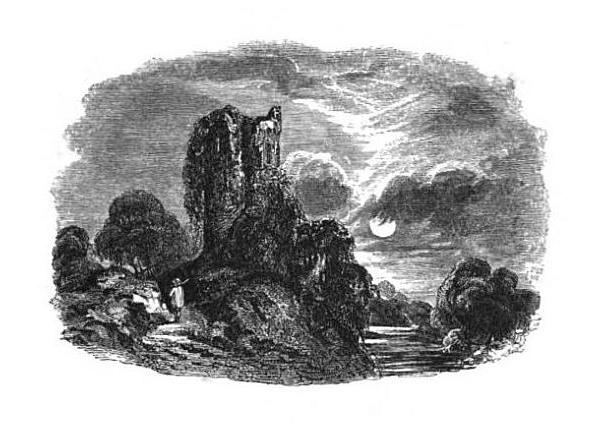
A woodcut to John Constable's design for stanza 3 of the Elegy

Many editions of the Elegy have contained illustrations, some of considerable merit, such as those among the Designs by Mr. Bentley, for Six Poems by Mr. T. Gray (1753). But the work of two leading artists is particularly noteworthy. Between 1777 and 1778 William Blake was commissioned by John Flaxman to produce an illustrated set of Gray's poems as a birthday gift to his wife. These were in watercolour and included twelve for the Elegy, which appeared at the end of the volume. Another individual book was created in 1910 by the illuminator Sidney Farnsworth, hand written in italic script with a mediaeval decorative surround and more modern-looking inset illustrations.

Another notable illuminated edition had been created in 1846 by Owen Jones in a legible blackletter script with one decorative initial per page. Produced by chromolithography, each of its 35 pages was individually designed with two half stanzas in a box surrounded by coloured foliar and floral borders. An additional feature was the cover of deeply embossed brown leather made to imitate carved wood. A little earlier there had been a compositely illustrated work for which the librarian John Martin had been responsible. Having approached John Constable and other major artists for designs to illustrate the Elegy, these were then engraved on wood for the first edition in 1834. Some were reused in later editions, including the multilingual anthology of 1839 mentioned above. Constable's charcoal and wash study of the "ivy-mantled tower" in stanza 3 is held by the Victoria and Albert Museum, as is his watercolour study of Stoke Poges church, while the watercolour for stanza 5, in which the narrator leans on a gravestone to survey the cemetery, is held at the British Museum (see below).

While not an illustration in itself, Christopher Nevinson's statement against the slaughter of World War I in his painting Paths of Glory (1917) takes its title from another line in the Elegy, "The paths of glory lead but to the grave". That title had been used two years before by Irvin S. Cobb in a journalistic account of his experiences at the start of WWI. The same title was then applied to Humphrey Cobb's 1935 anti-war novel, although in that case the name of the untitled manuscript was chosen based on a competition held by the publisher. Cobb's novel later served as the basis for Stanley Kubrick's film Paths of Glory (1957). This example illustrates the imaginative currency that certain lines of Gray's poem have had, over and above their original significance.

Since the poem is long, there have been few musical settings. Musicians during the 1780s adopted the solution of selecting only a portion of the Elegy. W. Tindal's musical setting for voices was of the "Epitaph" (1785), which was perhaps the item performed as a trio after a recitation of the poem at the newly opened Royalty Theatre in London in 1787. At about that time too, Stephen Storace set the first two stanzas in his "The curfew tolls" for voice and keyboard, with a reprise of the first stanza at the end. At the period there were guides for the dramatic performance of such pieces involving expressive hand gestures, and they included directions for this piece. There is also an item described as "Gray's Elegy set to music" in various settings for voice accompanied by harpsichord or harp by Thomas Billington (1754–1832), although this too may have only been an excerpt. A member of the theatrical world, Billington was noted as "fond of setting the more serious and gloomier passages in English verse"

In 1830, a well known composer of glees, George Hargreaves, set "Full many a gem", the Elegy's fourteenth stanza, for four voices. And finally, at the other end of the century, Alfred Cellier did set the whole work in a cantata composed expressly for the Leeds Festival, 1883. The work was "dedicated to Mrs Coleman of Stoke Park, in memory of some pleasant hours at the very spot where the scene of the elegy is supposed to be laid." A nearly contemporary cantata was also composed by Gertrude E. Quinton as Musa elegeia: being a setting to music of Gray's Elegy (London, 1885).

The only other example yet discovered of a translation of the Elegy set to music was the few lines rendered into German by Ella Backus Behr (1897–1928) in America.

== Critical response ==
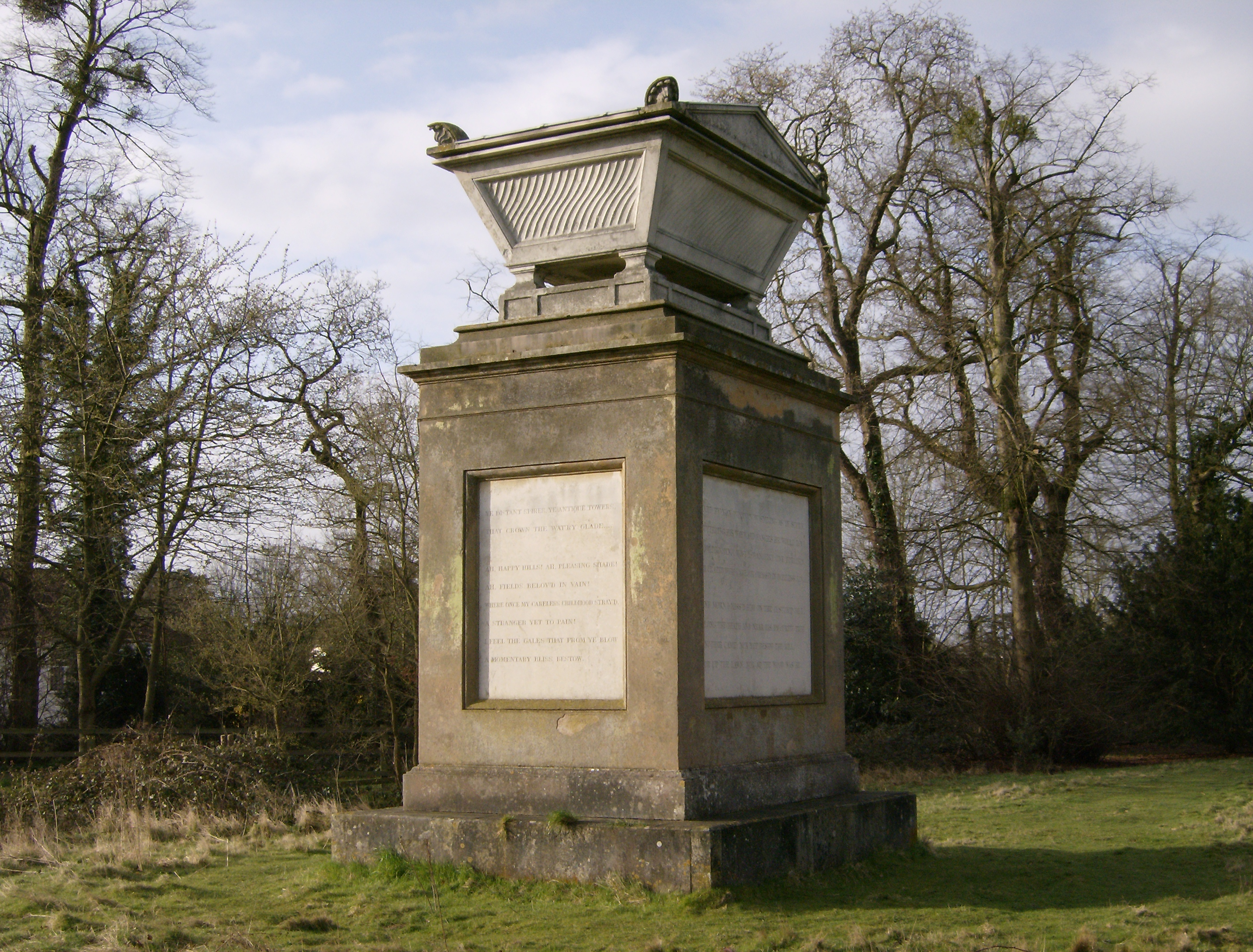
Memorial at Stoke Poges dedicated to the elegy

The immediate response to the final draft version of the poem was positive and Walpole was very pleased with the work. During the summer of 1750, Gray received so much positive support regarding the poem that he was in dismay, but did not mention it in his letters until an 18 December 1750 letter to Wharton. In the letter, Gray said,

The Stanza's, which I now enclose to you have had the Misfortune by Mr W:s Fault to be made ... publick, for which they certainly were never meant, but it is too late to complain. They have been so applauded, it is quite a Shame to repeat it. I mean not to be modest; but I mean, it is a shame for those who have said such superlative Things about them, that I can't repeat them. I should have been glad, that you & two or three more People had liked them, which would have satisfied my ambition on this head amply.

The poem was praised for its universal aspects, and Gray became one of the most famous English poets of his era. Despite this, after his death only his elegy remained popular until 20th-century critics began to re-evaluate his poetry. The 18th-century writer James Beattie was said by Sir William Forbes, 6th Baronet to have written a letter to him claiming, "Of all the English poets of this age, Mr. Gray is most admired, and I think with justice; yet there are comparatively speaking but a few who know of anything of his, but his 'Church-yard Elegy,' which is by no means the best of his works."

There is a story that the British General James Wolfe read the poem before his troops arrived at the Plains of Abraham in September 1759 as part of the Seven Years' War. After reading the poem, he is reported to have said: "Gentlemen, I would rather have written those lines than take Quebec tomorrow." Adam Smith, in his 21st lecture on rhetoric in 1763, argued that poetry should deal with "A temper of mind that differs very little from the common tranquillity of mind is what we can best enter into, by the perusal of a small piece of a small length ... an Ode or Elegy in which there is no odds but in the measure which differ little from the common state of mind are what most please us. Such is that on the Church yard, or Eton College by Mr Grey [sic]. The Best of Horaces (tho inferior to Mr Greys) are all of this sort." Even Samuel Johnson, who knew Gray but did not like his poetry, later praised the poem when he wrote in his Life of Gray (1779) that it "abounds with images which find a mirror in every breast; and with sentiments to which every bosom returns an echo. The four stanzas beginning Yet even these bones, are to me original: I have never seen the notions in any other place; yet he that reads them here, persuades himself that he has always felt them."

Johnson's general criticism prompted many others to join in the debate. Some reviewers of his Lives of the Poets, and many of Gray's editors, thought that he was too harsh. An article in the Annual Register for 1782 recognised, with relation to the Elegy, "That the doctor was not over zealous to allow [Gray] the degree of praise that the public voice had universally assigned him, is, we think, sufficiently apparent"; but it went on to qualify this with the opinion that "partiality to [Gray's] beautiful elegy had perhaps allotted him a rank above his general merits." Debate over Gray's work continued into the 19th century, and Victorian critics remained unconvinced by the rest of it. At the end of the century, Matthew Arnold, in his 1881 collection of critical writings, summed up the general response: "The Elegy pleased; it could not but please: but Gray's poetry, on the whole, astonished his contemporaries at first more than it pleased them; it was so unfamiliar, so unlike the sort of poetry in vogue."

In 1882, Edmund Gosse analyzed the reception of Gray's poem: "It is curious to reflect upon the modest and careless mode in which that poem was first circulated which was destined to enjoy and to retain a higher reputation in literature than any other English poem perhaps than any other poem of the world written between Milton and Wordsworth." He continued by stressing the poem's wide acceptance: "The fame of the Elegy has spread to all countries and has exercised an influence on all the poetry of Europe, from Denmark to Italy, from France to Russia. With the exception of certain works of Byron and Shakespeare, no English poem has been so widely admired and imitated abroad and after more than a century of existence we find it as fresh as ever, when its copies, even the most popular of all those of Lamartine, are faded and tarnished." He concluded with a reinforcing claim on the poem's place in English poetry: "It possesses the charm of incomparable felicity, of a melody that is not too subtle to charm every ear, of a moral persuasiveness that appeals to every generation, and of metrical skill that in each line proclaims the master. The Elegy may almost be looked upon as the typical piece of English verse, our poem of poems; not that it is the most brilliant or original or profound lyric in our language, but because it combines in more balanced perfection than any other all the qualities that go to the production of a fine poetical effect."

=== 20th-century response ===
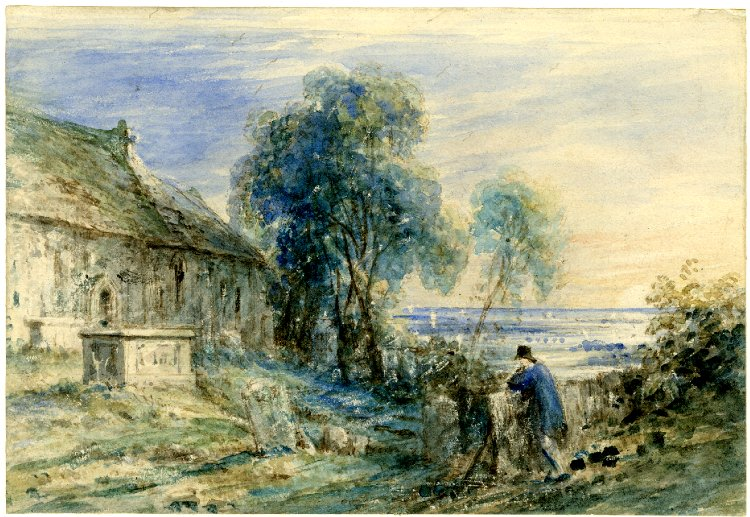
John Constable's study for stanza 5, 1833

Critics at the beginning of the 20th century believed that the poem's use of sound and tone made it great. The French critic Louis Cazamian claimed in 1927 that Gray "discovered rhythms, utilised the power of sounds, and even created evocations. The triumph of this sensibility allied to so much art is to be seen in the famous Elegy, which from a somewhat reasoning and moralizing emotion has educed a grave, full, melodiously monotonous song, in which a century weaned from the music of the soul tasted all the sadness of eventide, of death, and of the tender musing upon self." I. A. Richards, following in 1929, declared that the merits of the poem come from its tone: "poetry, which has no other very remarkable qualities, may sometimes take very high rank simply because the poet's attitude to his listeners – in view of what he has to say – is so perfect. Gray and Dryden are notable examples. Gray's Elegy, indeed, might stand as a supreme instance to show how powerful an exquisitely adjusted tone may be. It would be difficult to maintain that the thought in this poem is either striking or original, or that its feeling is exceptional." He continued: "the Elegy may usefully remind us that boldness and originality are not necessities for great poetry. But these thoughts and feelings, in part because of their significance and their nearness to us, are peculiarly difficult to express without faults ... Gray, however, without overstressing any point composes a long address, perfectly accommodating his familiar feelings towards the subject and his awareness of the inevitable triteness of the only possible reflections, to the discriminating attention of his audience. And this is the source of his triumph."

In the 1930s and 1940s, critics emphasised the content of the poem, and some felt that it fell short of what was necessary to make it truly great. In 1930, William Empson, while praising the form of the poem as universal, argued against its merits because of its potential political message. He claimed that the poem "as the context makes clear", means that "18th-century England had no scholarship system of carriere ouverte aux talents. This is stated as pathetic, but the reader is put into a mood in which one would not try to alter it ... By comparing the social arrangement to Nature he makes it seem inevitable, which it was not, and gives it a dignity which was undeserved. Furthermore, a gem does not mind being in a cave and a flower prefers not to be picked; we feel that man is like the flower, as short-lived, natural, and valuable, and this tricks us into feeling that he is better off without opportunities." He continued: "the truism of the reflection in the churchyard, the universality and impersonality this gives to the style, claim as if by comparison that we ought to accept the injustice of society as we do the inevitability of death." T. S. Eliot's 1932 collection of essays contained a comparison of the elegy to the sentiment found in metaphysical poetry: "The feeling, the sensibility, expressed in the Country Churchyard (to say nothing of Tennyson and Browning) is cruder than that in the Coy Mistress." Later, in 1947, Cleanth Brooks pointed out that "In Gray's poem, the imagery does seem to be intrinsically poetic; the theme, true; the 'statement', free from ambiguity, and free from irony." After describing various aspects and complexities within the poem, Brooks provided his view on the poem's conclusion: "the reader may not be altogether convinced, as I am not altogether convinced, that the epitaph with which the poem closes is adequate. But surely its intended function is clear, and it is a necessary function if the poem is to have a structure and is not to be considered merely a loose collection of poetic passages."

Critics during the 1950s and 1960s generally regarded the Elegy as powerful, and emphasised its place as one of the great English poems. In 1955, R. W. Ketton-Cremer argued, "At the close of his greatest poem Gray was led to describe, simply and movingly, what sort of man he believed himself to be, how he had fared in his passage through the world, and what he hoped for from eternity." Regarding the status of the poem, Graham Hough in 1953 explained, "no one has ever doubted, but many have been hard put to it to explain in what its greatness consists. It is easy to point out that its thought is commonplace, that its diction and imagery are correct, noble but unoriginal, and to wonder where the immediately recognizable greatness has slipped in." Following in 1963, Martin Day argued that the poem was "perhaps the most frequently quoted short poem in English." Frank Brady, in 1965, declared, "Few English poems have been so universally admired as Gray's Elegy, and few interpreted in such widely divergent ways." Patricia Spacks, in 1967, focused on the psychological questions in the poem and claimed that "For these implicit questions the final epitaph provides no adequate answer; perhaps this is one reason why it seems not entirely a satisfactory conclusion to the poem." She continued by praising the poem: "Gray's power as a poet derives largely from his ability to convey the inevitability and inexorability of conflict, conflict by its nature unresolvable." In 1968, Herbert Starr pointed out that the poem was "frequently referred to, with some truth, as the best known poem in the English language."

During the 1970s, some critics pointed out how the lines of the poems were memorable and popular while others emphasised the poem's place in the greater tradition of English poetry. W. K. Wimsatt, in 1970, suggested, "Perhaps we shall be tempted to say only that Gray transcends and outdoes Hammond and Shenstone simply because he writes a more poetic line, richer, fuller, more resonant and memorable in all the ways in which we are accustomed to analyze the poetic quality." In 1971, Charles Cudworth declared that the elegy was "a work which probably contains more famous quotations per linear inch of text than any other in the English language, not even excepting Hamlet." When describing how Gray's Elegy is not a conventional elegy, Eric Smith added in 1977, "Yet, if the poem at so many points fails to follow the conventions, why are we considering it here? the answer is partly that no study of major English elegies could well omit it. But it is also, and more importantly, that in its essentials Gray's Elegy touches this tradition at many points, and consideration of them is of interest to both to appreciation of the poem and to seeing how [...] they become in the later tradition essential points of reference." Also in 1977, Thomas Carper noted, "While Gray was a schoolboy at Eton, his poetry began to show a concern with parental relationships, and with his position among the great and lowly in the world [...] But in the "Elegy Written in a Country Churchyard" these longstanding and very human concerns have their most affecting expression." In 1978, Howard Weinbrot noted, "With all its long tradition of professional examination the poem remains distant for many readers, as if the criticism could not explain why Johnson thought that "The Church-yard abounds with images that find a mirrour in every mind". He continued by arguing that it is the poem's discussion of morality and death that is the source of its "enduring popularity".

By the 1980s, critics emphasised the power of the poem's message and technique, and it was seen as an important English poem. After analyzing the language of the poem, W. Hutchings declared in 1984, "The epitaph, then, is still making us think, still disturbing us, even as it uses the language of conventional Christianity and conventional epitaphs. Gray does not want to round his poem off neatly, because death is an experience of which we cannot be certain, but also because the logic of his syntax demands continuity rather than completion." Also in 1984, Anne Williams claimed, "ever since publication it has been both popular and universally admired. Few readers then or now would dispute Dr. Johnson's appraisal ... In the twentieth century we have remained eager to praise, yet praise has proved difficult; although tradition and general human experience affirm that the poem is a masterpiece, and although one could hardly wish a single word changed, it seems surprisingly resistant to analysis. It is lucid, and at first appears as seamless and smooth as monumental alabaster." Harold Bloom, in 1987, claimed, "What moves me most about the superb Elegy is the quality that, following Milton, it shares with so many of the major elegies down to Walt Whitman's ... Call this quality the pathos of a poetic death-in-life, the fear that one either has lost one's gift before life has ebbed, or that one may lose life before the poetic gift has expressed itself fully. This strong pathos of Gray's Elegy achieves a central position as the antithetical tradition that truly mourns primarily a loss of the self." In 1988, Morris Golden, after describing Gray as a "poet's poet" and places him "within the pantheon of those poets with whom familiarity is inescapable for anyone educated in the English language" declared that in "the 'Elegy Written in a Country Church-yard,' mankind has felt itself to be directly addressed by a very sympathetic, human voice." He later pointed out: "Gray's 'Elegy' was universally admired in his lifetime and has remained continuously the most popular of mid-eighteenth-century English poems; it is, as Gosse has called it, the standard English poem. The reason for this extraordinary unanimity of praise are as varied as the ways in which poetry can appeal. The 'Elegy' is a beautiful technical accomplishment, as can be seen even in such details as the variation of the vowel sounds or the poet's rare discretion in the choice of adjectives and adverbs. Its phrasing is both elegant and memorable, as is evident from the incorporation of much of it into the living language."

Modern critics emphasised the poem's use of language as a reason for its importance and popularity. In 1995, Lorna Clymer argued, "The dizzying series of displacements and substitutions of subjects, always considered a crux in Thomas Gray's "Elegy Written in a Country Churchyard" (1751), results from a complex manipulation of epitaphic rhetoric." Later, Robert Mack, in 2000, explained that "Gray's Elegy is numbered high among the very greatest poems in the English tradition precisely because of its simultaneous accessibility and inscrutability." He went on to claim that the poem "was very soon to transform his life – and to transform or at least profoundly affect the development of lyric poetry in English". While analyzing the use of "death" in 18th-century poetry, David Morris, in 2001, described the poem as "a monument in this ongoing transformation of death" and declared that "the poem in its quiet portraits of rural life succeeds in drawing the forgotten dead back into the community of the living."

== Bibliography ==
- Anonymous (1896), "Academy Portraits: V. – Thomas Gray", The Academy, vol. 50 (July–December 1896), London: Alexander and Shepheard
- Arnold, Matthew (1881), The English Poets, vol. III, London: Macmillan and Co.
- Benedict, Barbara (2001), "Publishing and Reading Poetry", in Sitter, John (ed.), The Cambridge Companion to Eighteenth-Century Poetry, Cambridge University Press, pp. 63–82, ISBN 978-0-521-65885-0
- Bieri, James (2008), Percy Bysshe Shelley, Baltimore: Johns Hopkins University Press
- Bloom, Harold (1987), "Introduction", in Harold Bloom (ed.), Thomas Gray's Elegy Written in a Country Churchyard, New York: Chelsea House
- Brady, Frank (1987), "Structure and Meaning in Gray's Elegy", in Harold Bloom (ed.), Thomas Gray's Elegy Written in a Country Churchyard, New York: Chelsea House
- Brooks, Cleanth (1947), The Well Wrought Urn, Harcourt, Brace & World
- Carper, Thomas (1987), "Gray's Personal Elegy", in Harold Bloom (ed.), Thomas Gray's Elegy Written in a Country Churchyard, New York: Chelsea House
- Cazamian, Louis (1957), A History of English Literature: Modern Times, Macmillan (New York) (Trans. W. D. MacInnes and Louis Cazamian)
- Cecil, David (1959), "The Poetry of Thomas Gray", in Clifford, James (ed.), Eighteenth Century English Literature, Oxford University Press
- Cohen, Ralph (2001), "The Return to the Ode", in Sitter, John (ed.), The Cambridge Companion to Eighteenth-Century Poetry, Cambridge University Press, pp. 203–24, ISBN 978-0-521-65885-0
- Colombo, John (1984), Canadian Literary Landmarks, Hounslow Press
- Cudworth, Charles (1971), "Thomas Gray and Music", The Musical Times, vol. 112, no. 1541 (July 1971), Musical Times Publications, pp. 646–48, doi:10.2307/957005, JSTOR 957005
- Clymer, Lorna (1995), "Graved in Tropes: The Figural Logic of Epitaphs and Elegies in Blair, Gray, Cowper, and Wordsworth", ELH, vol. 62, no. 2 (Summer 1995), pp. 347–86, doi:10.1353/elh.1995.0011, S2CID 161945136
- Day, Martin (1963), History of English Literature 1660–1837, Garden City: Doubleday
- Eliot, T. S. (1932), Selected Essays, New York: Harcourt Brace
- Fulford, Tim (2001), "'Nature' poetry", in Sitter, John (ed.), The Cambridge Companion to Eighteenth-Century Poetry, Cambridge University Press, pp. 109–32, ISBN 978-0-521-65885-0
- Garrison, James D., A Dangerous Liberty: Translating Gray's Elegy, University of Delaware 2009
- Gibson, John, with Peter Wilkinson, and Stephen Freeth (eds), Thomas Gray: Elegy in a Country Church Yard, Latin Translations, 1762–2001, (Orpington, 2008)
- Golden, Morris (1988), Thomas Gray, Boston: Twayne Publishers
- Gosse, Edmund (1918), Gray, London: Macmillan and Co.
- Gray, Thomas (1903). Bradshaw, John (ed.). The Poetical Works of Thomas Gray. London: G. Bell and Sons.
- Griffin, Dustin (2002), Patriotism and Poetry in Eighteenth-Century Britain, Cambridge University Press
- Haffenden, John (2005), William Empson: Among the Mandarins, Oxford University Press
- Holmes, Richard (1976), Shelley: The Pursuit, London: Quartet Books
- Hough, Graham (1953), The Romantic Poets, London: Hutchinson's University Library
- Hutchings, W. (1987), "Syntax of Death: Instability in Gray's Elegy Written in a Country Churchyard", in Harold Bloom (ed.), Thomas Gray's Elegy Written in a Country Churchyard, New York: Chelsea House
- Johnson, Samuel (1979), Johnson on Shakespeare, Orient Longman
- Johnston, Kenneth (2001), The Hidden Wordsworth, New York: Norton
- Jones, W. Powell (1959), "Johnson and Gray: A Study in Literary Antagonism", TModern Philologys, vol. 56, no. 4 (May, 1959), pp. 646–48
- Ketton-Cremer, R. W. (1955), Thomas Gray, Cambridge: Cambridge University Press
- Lonsdale, Roger (1973), "The Poetry of Thomas Gray: Versions of the Self", Proceedings of the British Academy (59): 105–23
- Mack, Robert (2000), Thomas Gray: A Life, New Haven and London: Yale University Press, ISBN 0-300-08499-4
- Martin, John (ed.), Elegy Written in a Country Church-yard: With Versions in the Greek, Latin, German, Italian, and French Languages (London 1839)
- Mileur, Jean-Pierre (1987), "Spectators at Our Own Funerals", in Harold Bloom (ed.), Thomas Gray's Elegy Written in a Country Churchyard, New York: Chelsea House
- Morris, David B. (2001), "A Poetry of Absence", in Sitter, John (ed.), The Cambridge Companion to Eighteenth-Century Poetry, Cambridge University Press, pp. 225–48, ISBN 978-0-521-65885-0
- Nicholls, Norton, ed. (1836), The Works of Thomas Gray, London: William Pickering
- Northup, Clark (1917), A Bibliography of Thomas Gray, New Haven: Yale University Press; there is a version online at the Thomas Gray Archive
- Richards, I. A. (1929), Practical Criticism, London: K. Paul, Trench, Trubner
- Ryals, Clyde de L. (1996), The Life of Robert Browning, Oxford: Blackwell
- Rzepka, Charles (1986), The Self as Mind, Cambridge: Harvard University Press
- Sacks, Peter (1985), The English Elegy, Johns Hopkins University Press
- Sha, Richard (1990), "Gray's Political Elegy: Poetry as the Burial of History", Philological Quarterly (69): 337–57
- Sherbo, Arthur (1975), English Poetic Diction from Chaucer to Wordsworth, Michigan State University Press
- Sitter, John (2001), "Introduction", in Sitter, John (ed.), The Cambridge Companion to Eighteenth-Century Poetry, Cambridge University Press, pp. 1–10, ISBN 978-0-521-65885-0
- Smith, Adam (1985), Lectures on Rhetoric and Belles Lettres, Indianapolis: Liberty Fund
- Smith, Eric (1987), "Gray: Elegy Written in a Country Churchyard", in Harold Bloom (ed.), Thomas Gray's Elegy Written in a Country Churchyard, New York: Chelsea House
- Spacks, Patricia (1967), The Poetry of Vision, Harvard University Press
- Starr, Herbert (1968), "Introduction", in Herbert Starr (ed.), Twentieth Century Interpretations of Gray's Elegy, Englewood Cliffs: Prentice Hall
- Torri, Alessandro, L'elegia di Tommaso Gray sopra un cimitero di campagna tradotta dall'inglese in più lingue con varie cose finora inedite, Verona 1819
- Turk, Thomas N., "Search and Rescue: An Annotated Checklist of Translations of Gray's Elegy", Translation and Literature, Edinburgh University 2013, pp. 45–73
- Turner, Paul (2001), The Life of Thomas Hardy, Oxford: Blackwell
- Weinbrot, Howard (1987), "Gray's Elegy: A Poem of Moral Choice and Resolution", in Harold Bloom (ed.), Thomas Gray's Elegy Written in a Country Churchyard, New York: Chelsea House
- Weinfield, Henry (1991), The Poet Without a Name: Gray's Elegy and the Problem of History, SIU Press
- Williams, Anne (1984), The Prophetic Strain, University of Chicago Press
- Williams, Anne (1987), "Elegy into Lyric: Elegy Written in a Country Churchyard", in Harold Bloom (ed.), Thomas Gray's Elegy Written in a Country Churchyard, New York: Chelsea House
- Wimsatt, W. K. (1970), "Imitations as Freedom", in Reuben Brower (ed.), Forms of Lyric, New York: Columbia University Press
- Wright, George (1976), "Eliot Written in a Country Churchyard: The Elegy and the Four Quartets", ELH, vol. 42, no. 2 (Summer 1976), pp. 227–43
- Young, John (1783), A Criticism on the Elegy Written in a Country Church Yard, London: G. Wilkie
