= Cromer (disambiguation) =

Cromer is a coastal town in Norfolk, England.

Cromer may also refer to:

== Places ==
=== England ===
- Cromer railway station, Cromer, Norfolk, England
- Cromer, Hertfordshire, a hamlet in England

=== Elsewhere ===
- Cromer, New South Wales, a suburb of Sydney, Australia
- Cromer, South Australia, a locality
- Cromer, Manitoba, a village in Canada
- 10283 Cromer, main-belt asteroid

== People ==
- Cromer (surname)
- Earl of Cromer
  - Evelyn Baring, 1st Earl of Cromer, British official in control of Egypt 1883-1907
  - Rowland Baring, 2nd Earl of Cromer
  - Rowland Baring, 3rd Earl of Cromer
- Cromer Ashburnham (1831–1917), British Army major-general

== Ships ==
- HMS Cromer (J128), a Bangor-class minesweeper lost in 1942
- HMS Cromer (M103), a Sandown-class minehunter launched in 1990 and decommissioned in 2001
- HMS Cromer (1867), a Britomart-class wooden screw gunboat of the Royal Navy
- SS Cromer, launched in 1902

== Other uses ==
- Cromer Street, London, England
- Cromer Academy, a secondary school in Cromer, Norfolk, England
- Cromer blood group

== See also ==
- Cromer Town F.C.
- Cromer Lifeboat Station
- Cromer Lighthouse
- Cromer Forest Bed, a geological formation
- Cromer Ridge, a ridge of old glacial moraines
- Cromers, Georgia, an unincorporated community in the US
- Cromers, Ohio, an unincorporated community in the US
- Croma (disambiguation)
- Chroma (disambiguation)
