= Croma =

Croma may refer to:

- Croma (programming language), a dialect of the Lisp programming language
- Cromā, an Indian retailer of consumer electronics
- Giulio Croma (1572–1632), Italian painter
- Fiat Croma, a car

== See also ==
- Chroma (disambiguation)
- Cromer (disambiguation)
