= Graveyard poets =

Pre-Romantic 18th-century English poets

The "Graveyard Poets", also termed "Churchyard Poets", were a number of pre-Romantic poets of the 18th century characterised by their gloomy meditations on mortality, "skulls and coffins, epitaphs and worms" elicited by the presence of the graveyard. Moving beyond the elegy lamenting a single death, their purpose was rarely sensationalist. As the century progressed, "graveyard" poetry increasingly expressed a feeling for the "sublime" and uncanny, and an antiquarian interest in ancient English poetic forms and folk poetry. The "graveyard poets" are often recognized as precursors of the Gothic literary genre, as well as the Romantic movement.

== Overview ==
The Graveyard School is an indefinite literary grouping that binds together a wide variety of authors; what makes a poem a "graveyard" poem remains open to critical dispute. At its narrowest, the term "Graveyard School" refers to four poems: Thomas Gray's "Elegy Written in a Country Churchyard", Thomas Parnell's "Night-Piece on Death", Robert Blair's The Grave and Edward Young's Night-Thoughts. At its broadest, it can describe a host of poetry and prose works popular in the early and mid-eighteenth century. The term itself was not used as a brand for the poets and their poetry until William Macneile Dixon did so in 1898.

Some literary critics have emphasized Milton's minor poetry as the main influence of the meditative verse written by the Graveyard Poets. W. L. Phelps, for example, said: "It was not so much in form as in thought that Milton affected the Romantic movement; and although Paradise Lost was always reverentially considered his greatest work, it was not at this time nearly so effective as his minor poetry; and in the latter it was Il Penseroso — the love of meditative comfortable melancholy — that penetrated most deeply into the Romantic soul". However, other critics like Raymond D. Havens, Harko de Maar and Eric Partridge have challenged the direct influence of Milton's poem, claiming rather that graveyard poetry came from a culmination of literary precedents. As a result of the religious revival, the early eighteenth century was a time of both spiritual unrest and regeneration; therefore, meditation and melancholy, death and life, ghosts and graveyards, were attractive subjects to poets at that time. These subjects were, however, interesting to earlier poets as well. The Graveyard School's melancholy was not new to English poetry, but rather a continuation of that of previous centuries; there is even an elegiac quality to the poems almost reminiscent of Anglo-Saxon literature. The characteristics and style of Graveyard poetry is not unique to them, and the same themes and tone are found in ballads and odes.

Many of the Graveyard School poets were, like Thomas Parnell, Christian clergymen, and as such they often wrote didactic poetry, combining aesthetics with religious and moral instruction. They were also inclined toward contemplating subjects related to life after death, which is reflected in how their writings focus on human mortality and man's relation to the divine. The religious culture of the mid-eighteenth century included an emphasis on private devotion, as well as the end of printed funeral sermons. Each of these conditions demanded a new kind of text with which people could meditate on life and death in a personal setting. The Graveyard School met that need, and the poems were thus quite popular, especially with the middle class. For instance Elizabeth Singer Rowe's Friendship in Death: In Twenty Letters from the Dead to the Living, published in 1728, had 27 editions printed by 1760. This popularity, as Parisot says, "confirms the fashionable mid-century taste for mournful piety." Thomas Gray, who found inspiration in a churchyard, claimed to have a naturally melancholy spirit, writing in a letter that "low spirits are my true and faithful companions; they get up with me, go to bed with me; make journeys and returns as I do; nay, and pay visits, and will even affect to be jocose, and force a feeble laugh with me; but most commonly we sit alone together, and are the prettiest insipid company in the world".

The works of the Graveyard School continued to be popular into the early 19th century and were instrumental in the development of the Gothic novel, contributing to the dark, mysterious mood and story lines that characterize the genre — Graveyard School writers focused their writings on the lives of ordinary and unidentified characters. They are also considered pre-Romanticists, ushering in the Romantic literary movement by their reflection on emotional states. This emotional reflection is seen in Coleridge's "Dejection: An Ode" and Keats' "Ode on Melancholy". The early works of Southey, Byron and Shelley also show the influence of the Graveyard School.

== Partial list of Graveyard Poets ==
- Thomas Parnell
- John Keats
- Thomas Warton
- Thomas Percy
- Thomas Gray
- Oliver Goldsmith
- William Cowper
- Christopher Smart
- James Macpherson
- Robert Blair
- William Collins
- Thomas Chatterton
- Mark Akenside
- Joseph Warton
- Henry Kirke White
- Edward Young
- David Mallet
- William Mason
- James Beattie
- James Thomson is also sometimes included as a Graveyard Poet.

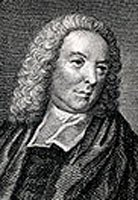
Edward Young

== Criticism ==
Many critics of graveyard poetry had very little positive feedback for the poets and their work. Critic Amy Louise Reed called graveyard poetry a disease, while other critics called many poems unoriginal, and said that the poets were better than their poetry. Although the majority of criticism about graveyard poetry is negative, other critics thought differently, especially about poet Edward Young. Critic Isabell St. John Bliss also celebrates Edward Young's ability to write his poetry in the style of the Graveyard School and at the same time include Christian themes, and Cecil V. Wicker called Young a forerunner in the Romantic movement and described his work as original. Eric Parisot claimed that fear is created as a spur to faith and that in graveyard poetry "...it is only when we restore religion — to examine the various ways graveyard poetry exploited fear and melancholy — that we can fully grasp its enduring contribution to the Gothic..."

== Poem samples ==
An illustration for Young's Night-Thoughts by William Blake.

The earliest poem attributed to the Graveyard School was Thomas Parnell's A Night-Piece on Death (1721), in which King Death himself gives an address from his kingdom of bones:

"When men my scythe and darts supply
How great a King of Fears am I!" (61–62)

Characteristic later poems include Edward Young's Night-Thoughts (1742), in which a lonely traveller in a graveyard reflects lugubriously on:

The vale funereal, the sad cypress gloom;
The land of apparitions, empty shades! (117–18)

Blair's The Grave (1743) proves to be no more cheerful as it relates with grim relish how:

Wild shrieks have issued from the hollow tombs;
Dead men have come again, and walked about;
And the great bell has tolled, unrung and untouched. (51–53)

However, a more contemplative mood is achieved in the celebrated opening verse of Gray's Elegy Written in a Country Churchyard (1751):

The curfew tolls the knell of parting day.
The lowing herd wind slowly o'er the lea,
The ploughman homeward plods his weary way,
And leaves the world to darkness and to me. (1–4)

== See also ==
- Romantic literature in English

== Other citations ==
- https://www.youtube.com/@GraveyardPoetry/videos
