= The Grave (poem) =

Poem by Robert Blair

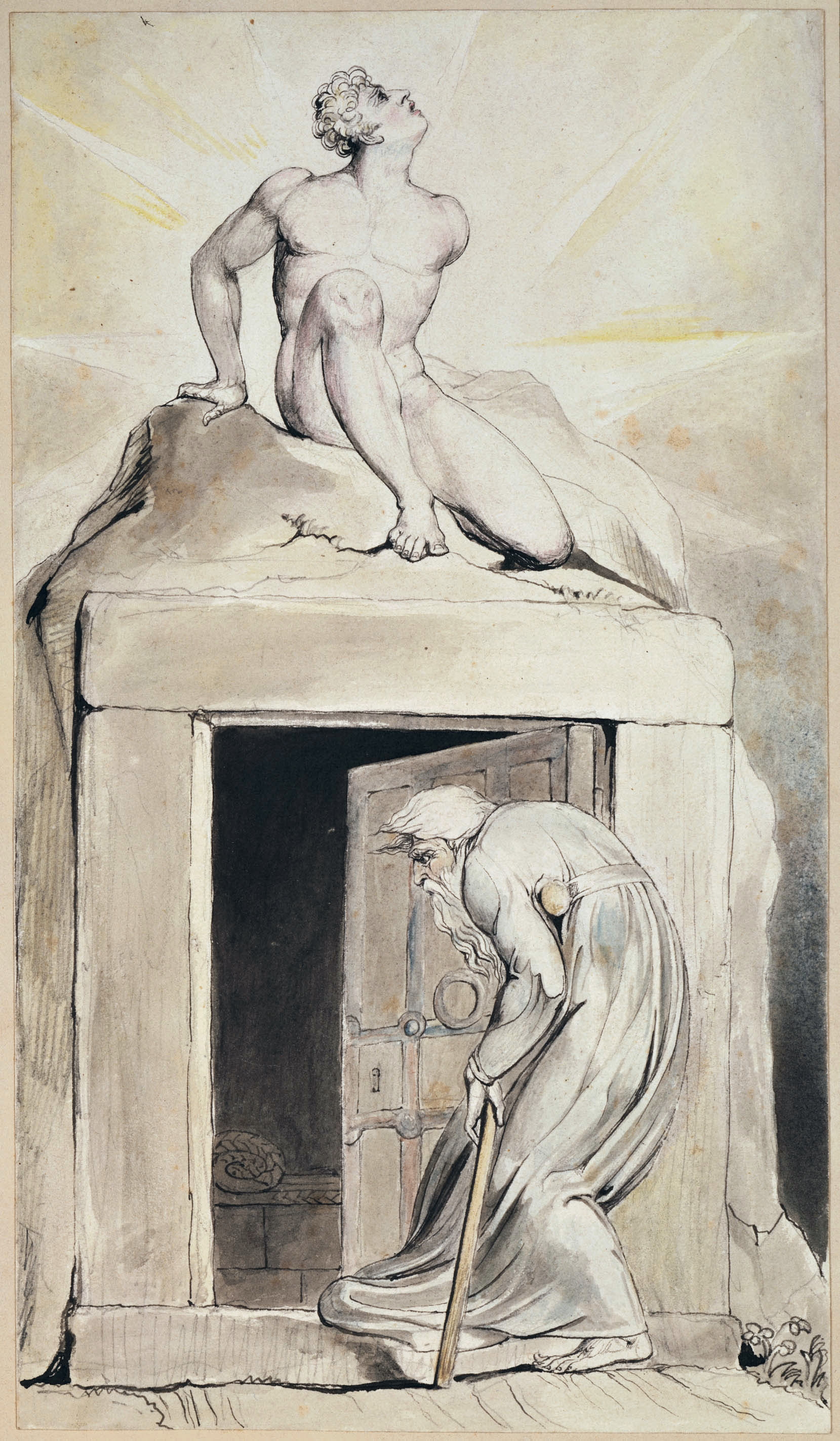
Death's Door by William Blake, an illustration for The Grave. The "resting youth" figure at the top can also be seen (with variations in inking, colouring, and background) in several of Blake's prior works. It appears on plate 21 of The Marriage of Heaven and Hell, in America, and in plate 4 of Jerusalem. The figure of the old man at the bottom also occurs elsewhere, as an illustration, also entitled Death's Door for Blake's own For Children: The Gates of Paradise, as well as in plate 12 of America. There is a similar figure of an old man, on one crutch and being helped through the streets by a young child, in London and in Jerusalem. The first time that Blake put both figures together, as here, was in a pencil sketch that dates to the time of America. They also appear together in a further (undated) pencil sketch, traced over in ink, with a pyramid in the background.

"The Grave" is a blank verse poem by the Scottish poet Robert Blair. It is the work for which he is primarily renowned. According to Blair, in a letter he wrote to Philip Doddridge, the greater part of the poem was composed before he became a minister. Edinburgh editor and publisher John Johnstone stated that it was composed whilst Blair was still a student, although "probably corrected and amplified by his more matured judgement." The poem, 767 lines long, is an exemplar of what became known as the school of graveyard poetry.

Part of the poem's continued prominence in scholarship involves a later printing of poems by Robert Hartley Cromek which included illustrations completed by the Romantic poet and illustrator William Blake. He completed forty illustrations for the poem, twenty of which were printed in Cromek's edition. Blake's original watercolours for the prints were believed lost, until they were rediscovered in 2003.

== First publication and critical reception ==
According to that same letter to Doddridge, two publishers rejected the poem before it was finally first published in 1743, in London by Mr. Cooper. The grounds for rejection, as related by Blair, were that he lived too far away from London to be able to "write so as to be acceptable to the fashionable and polite". He sarcastically observed that "to what distance from the metropolis these sapient booksellers conceived poetical inspiration to extend, we are not informed".

The first edition was not particularly successful, and there was no second edition of the work until 1747, when it was republished in Edinburgh. Its popularity grew gradually throughout the 18th century, however, in part because of the praise that it received from John Pinkerton (in his Letters of Literature (1786), written under the pseudonym Robert Heron).

Writing in 1822, Richard Alfred Davenport noted that the editor of British Poets spoke of the poem with "severity" and a "contemptuous tone". Davenport contrasted this with the praise given by Thomas Campbell in his biographical sketch of Blair in British Poets. Campbell stated that "the eighteenth century has few specimens of blank verse of so powerful and so simple a character as that of The Grave", and he described the poem as popular "not merely because it is religious, but because its language and imagery are free, natural, and picturesque".

Davenport himself went on to state that whilst the language "is occasionally familiar", echoing the charge of vulgarity levelled by the British Poets editor, "many of his similies, epithets, and detached expressions are eminently beautiful". He refuted the charge of vulgarity, and opined that perhaps "the general effect would be injured were more elevated expressions substituted".

Campbell described Blair as having in his poetry "a masculine and pronounced character even in his gloom and homeliness that keeps it most distinctly apart from either dullness or vulgarity". Johnstone similarly stated that the poem "everywhere exhibits a manly and vigorous spirit; and if some of the detached sketches want the grace of colouring and the smoothness of beauty, the truth of their anatomy is unimpeachable, and the moral expression dignified and masculine". However, Johnstone was not wholly positive in his criticism, observing that in the close of the poem there is "short-coming, if not absolute failure", and that the final triumph of Resurrection over the powers of Death and Hell were "felt to be wanting". Rather than "the rapturous exultation of the true poet", the close is "in that tone of sober confidence which might have found place in any eloquent sermon".

== Publication by Cromek and Blake's illustrations ==
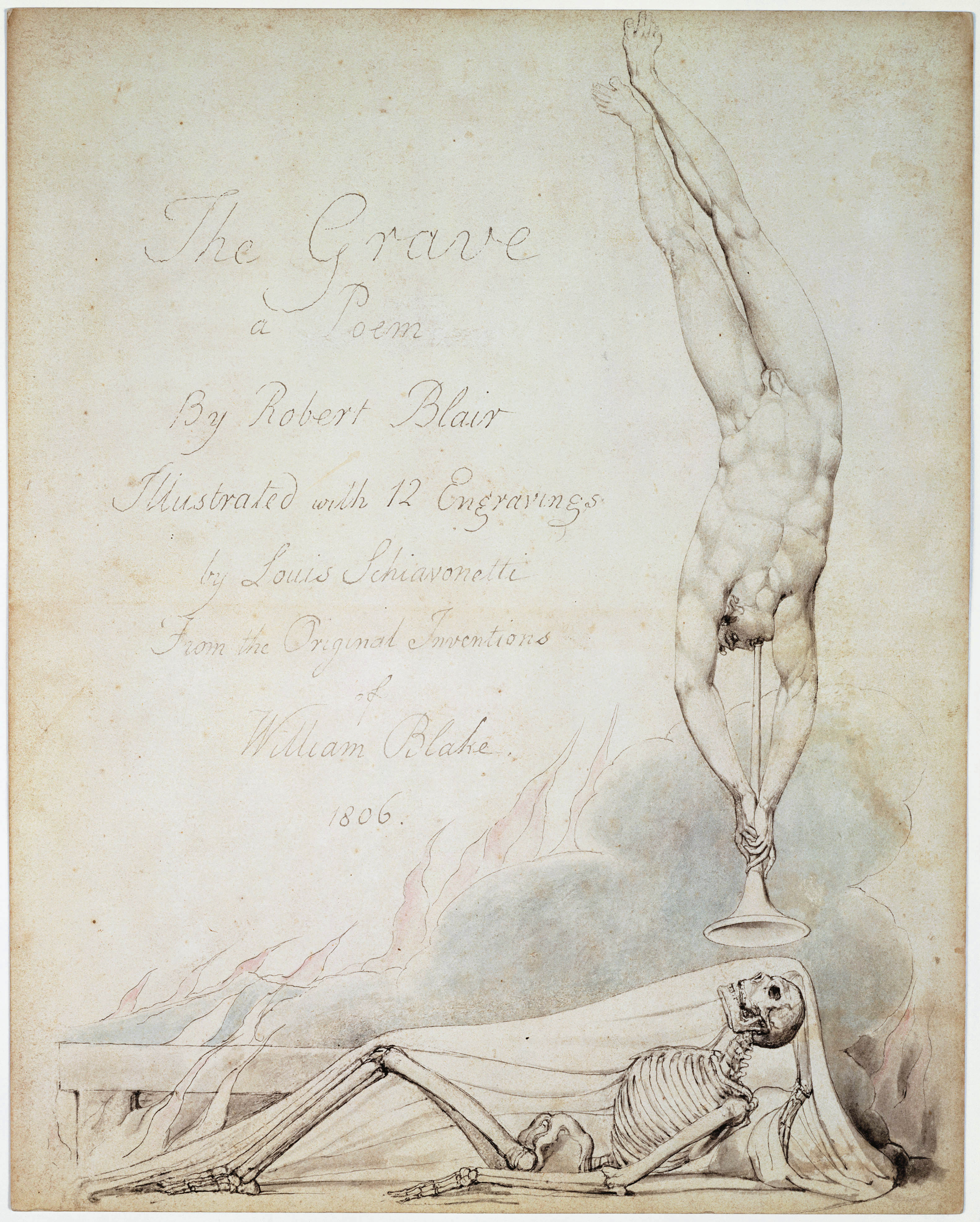
Title page of Cromek's 1808 publication of The Grave with Blake's drawing engraved by Schiavonetti

The most famous publication of the poem was by Robert Hartley Cromek, in part because it occasioned an initial friendship between Cromek and William Blake to turn to acrimony, and in turn because it led to Blake's Public Address, in which he criticized the work of engravers relative to that of illustrators for being as derivative as (amongst others) the translation of the works of Homer by Alexander Pope into rhyming couplets.

Cromek, making his first venture into publication after giving up a career as an engraver, commissioned Blake for a series of illustrations for an edition of The Grave that he was to publish in 1808. He commissioned from Blake, in 1805, forty illustrations, a selected twenty of which were to be engraved for the book. Blake understood that he was also to do those engravings. However, Cromek gave that work to Luigi Schiavonetti.

Blake was angered by both Cromek and Schiavonetti; Schiavonetti he re-christened "Assassinetti", and of Cromek he wrote in his notebook: "A petty Sneaking Knave I knew / O Mr Cr — —, how do ye do." He was also stung both by the criticism by Robert Hunt, writing in The Examiner on July 31, 1808, to object to Blake's depiction of the soul as if it were nothing but the mortal body; and by the similar criticism in the November 1808 edition of the Anti-Jacobin Review which described his illustrations as "the offspring of morbid fancy" and an attempt "to connect the visible with the invisible world" that had "totally failed". It was this that almost certainly prompted him to ask, in his 1809 advertisement for A Descriptive Catalogue, his only exhibition of his work in his lifetime, that people "do [him] the justice to examine before they decide".

Blake's biographer Alexander Gilchrist relates the tale opining that Cromek was right to employ the services of Schiavonetti, and that what Schiavonetti did was "a graceful translation and, as most would think, an improvement". Had Schiavonetti been likewise employed to similarly transcribe Blake's Canterbury Pilgrims and alter it by "correct smooth touches" then "a different fate would have awaited the composition" from the somewhat lacklustre one that it actually enjoyed. He describes Blake's illustrations of The Grave using words such as "extremes", "ravings", and "wild"; a wildness that Schiavonetti tamed.

However, this account was taken severely to task by the reviewer of Gilchrist's biography in The Westminster Review. The review questions Gilchrist's assertion that Cromek promised Blake the engraving work, and asks for more evidence of this given that Cromek would have known of the poor reception of Blake's engravings for Young's Night Thoughts. It questions the existence of Blake's design copyright, and challenges Gilchrist's assertion that Cromek "jockeyed" Blake out of it, especially given that Blake's quarrel with Cromek does not become apparent until longer after the illustrations were in the charge of Schiavonetti. Whilst agreeing that the illustrations were far the better for Schiavonetti's alterations, the reviewer accuses Gilchrist of "uncompromising partisanship" and a wholesale bias against and negative portrayal of Cromek.

The most rounded account of the affair, and of Blake's subsequent dealing with Cromek and Thomas Stothard over the Canterbury Pilgrims, is given by G. E. Bentley Jr, who relates the opinions of all parties and attempts to summarize the evidence, which is both complex and inconclusive.

Blake's original watercolours were believed lost, until they were rediscovered in 2003.
