= Thomas Hartley Cromek =

British painter

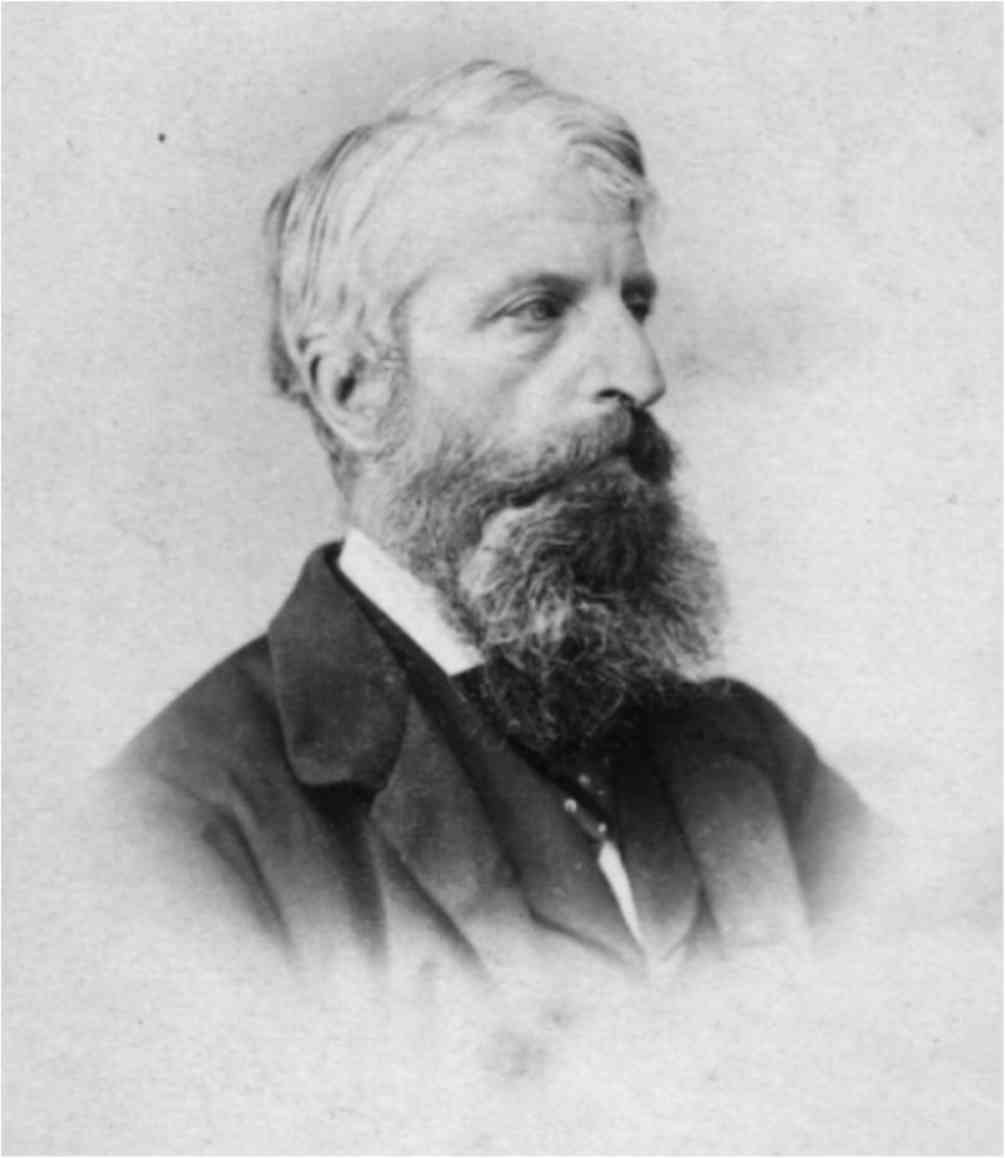
Photograph of Cromek, 1868

Thomas Hartley Cromek (1809-1873) was an English painter.

== Life ==
Cromek was born on 8 August 1809, the son of the engraver Robert Hartley Cromek. He was educated at Enoch Harrison's school in Wakefield; he then attended the Moravian School at Fulneck, and to the Grammar School at Wakefield, before he eventually returning to Harrison.

He had his first lessons in art from James Hunter, a portrait painter at Wakefield, but in 1826 he went to Leeds where he studied landscape painting under Joseph Rhodes, an artist of considerable ability, and also taught himself anatomical drawing.

In 1830 he decided to go to Italy to study the great masters. He passed through Belgium, the Rhineland, Switzerland, and Florence, and at length reached Rome, where he soon attracted attention by the excellence of his drawings and his careful colouring. From 1831 until 1849, with the exception of two short visits to England, Cromek passed his time in visiting and making drawings of the principal buildings and the picturesque scenery of Italy and Greece.

In 1850 he was unanimously elected an Associate of the New Society of Painters in Water-Colours, when he retired to Wakefield, where he died, after a long and painful illness, in 1873. His drawings, which are chiefly to be found in the royal and private collections, are much esteemed for the beauty of their colouring and their truthfulness to nature.
