= Chroma (musician) =

Japanese composer and musician

Chroma 黒魔
- Born: Masaki Sekikawa (関川聖城); September 16, 1993 (age 32); Hachinohe, Aomori Prefecture, Japan
- Genres: Electronic; ambient; chiptune; hyperpop
- Occupation: Musician
- Years active: 2007–present
- Label: Not Records
- Website: https://c-h-r-o-m-a.jp/

Masaki Sekikawa (Japanese: 関川聖城, Hepburn: Sekikawa Masaki; born September 16, 1993) commonly known as Chroma (Japanese: 黒魔, Hepburn: Kuroma), is a Japanese composer and musician. In 2007, when he was still in high school, he became known for a viral video in which he played the Super Mario Bros. soundtrack, when he still had no knowledge of music, a production that was considered "terrible". Over time, Sekikawa began to evolve his style, starting to work with the software Vocaloid, where he received a Hall of Fame award.

His growth as an artist surprised Internet users and was featured in news articles. After graduating in music at the age of 20, he moved to Tokyo and became an independent freelancer. Since then, Sekikawa has been a composer for Bemani series from Konami of Sound Voltex games, where he was awarded Konami's Highest Excellence Award for his song "I" in 2018. He has since released his own albums on streaming services.

== Biography and career ==
Masaki Sekikawa was born in Hachinohe, Aomori Prefecture, on September 16, 1993. He mentioned that, as a child, he had few friends and experienced bullying, but enjoyed drawing, storytelling, and making music. He began composing in the 3rd or 4th grade of elementary school, taught by his older brother, six years his senior, using a computer program that created music in loops. Sekikawa had an interest in video games but, lacking financial resources, often played on his brother's older consoles. He listened to music while playing and cited his admiration for the soundtrack of the game Chrono Trigger.

Using the composition software "Singer Song Writer", introduced by his brother, Sekikawa attempted to recreate by ear the main theme of the first stage of Super Mario Bros. At the time, Sekikawa was in his second year of high school. He remarked that when he listened to the music, "he realized something was wrong", but his brother said, "I don't know how to fix it". Nevertheless, his brother uploaded the music "for fun" in 2007 on Nico Nico Douga. Some time later, the video went viral, reaching first place in the platform's games category ranking and accumulating 2.8 million views. The music demonstrated Sekikawa's dissonance of pitch accuracy and irregular rhythms and at the time and became notable for being considered "terrible". Subsequently, Sekikawa created other videos in the "series".

=== 2011–2015: Early growth ===
I was able to experience the joy of creating music thanks to those who listened to my songs and shared their impressions, those who truly embraced my music, and the people around me.

— Sekikawa on the support that influenced his creative process.

Some time later, Sekikawa became "fascinated" by the software Hatsune Miku, from Vocaloid, starting to produce music through it and meeting musical producers from the program's community. In an interview, he commented, "I think it would have been completely different without Nico Douga and Vocaloid. I wouldn't have been able to connect with as many people as I do now". In 2011, one of his Vocaloid songs surpassed 100,000 views and reached the "VOCALOID Hall of Fame".

After graduating from high school in Hachinohe, he joined the music department of an electronic music vocational school in Sendai, learning the basics of composition theory and performance. He graduated at 20 and became a freelance artist. After working in his hometown, Aomori, for a while, he moved to Tokyo in August 2014, writing songs "every day", while sharing, at the time of the interview, a room with a friend he met in the Vocaloid community.

Sekikawa's development as an artist gained attention from Internet users and was featured in news articles. In an article from Kotaku Japan, published in 2015, about the improvement in Sekikawa's music quality, says about one of his recent songs, compared to his viral video: "This is proof of six years of growth [...] you can notice the difference in the first three seconds [...] If we work hard for six years, we can grow into someone else". An ITmedia article from the same year, comparing his viral video to a song created in 2014, noted: "Both are works of the same person, but the first has strange rhythm and sound, and the finalization makes you laugh just by listening. The latter has a broad and beautiful arrangement while playing the melody and atmosphere of the original song".

=== 2015–present: Recent works ===
Sekikawa's songs have been featured in the game Sound Voltex, part of the Bemani series from Konami and in Tapsonic Top, a rhythm game developed by Neowiz. In March 2016, he performed live music at the Exit Tunes Dance Party event along with other Sound Voltex musicians. That same year, he was one of the composers for the soundtrack of Show by Rock!!. In 2018, Sekikawa won the highest award (Grand Prize) at the 7th Konami Arcade Championship (KAC) Original Song Contest for his song "I" from Sound Voltex. Later, he began releasing singles and studio albums on streaming services. In 2019, Sekikawa released his first single "Dark Sheep". On April 24, 2019, Sekikawa released the album Ai o Yorokobu Machi (愛を喜ぶ街) through Not Records. It is a concept album built around a story: "A memory-lost robot travels through various lands, piecing together memories from each place, until arriving at the 'City That Rejoices in Love'". In October 2023, he released the album Tailless Hero. His music has been described by critics as "a variety of sound works ranging from chip sounds to ambient, electronic and hyperpop, weaving a different world for each song".

== Discography ==
Below are listed Sekikawa's studio albums available on streaming services.

Year	Title
2019	Ai o Yorokobu Machi (愛を喜ぶ街): Release: April 24, 2019; Record label: Not Records; Format: Streaming
2023	Tailless Hero: Release: October 6, 2023; Record label: Not Records; Format: Streaming

== Bibliography ==
- Okada, Yuka (10 February 2015). "「年に100曲作った」――"ひどい耳コピ"で笑われた中2、6年でプロ作曲家に ネットとボカロがつないだ成長の軌跡" ["I wrote 100 songs in a year" - After being laughed at for "terrible copying by ear", he became a professional composer in 2 to 6 years A trajectory of growth linked to the Internet and Vocaloid]. ITmedia NEWS (in Japanese). p. 3.
