= Walter Cromer =

Walter Cromer (fl. 1543) was a doctor to Henry VIII of England.

As Cromer was Scottish, when Henry began the Rough Wooing in 1543, Cromer was commissioned to teach Henry personally about Scotland's geography.
