= Robert Blair (poet) =

Scottish poet (1699–1746)

- Born: 17 April 1699; Edinburgh, Scotland
- Died: 4 February 1746 (aged 46); Athelstaneford, Scotland
- Occupation: Poet
- Notable work: The Grave (1743)

Rev Robert Blair (17 April 1699 – 4 February 1746) was a Scottish poet. His fame rests upon his poem The Grave, which in a later printing was illustrated by William Blake.

== Biography ==
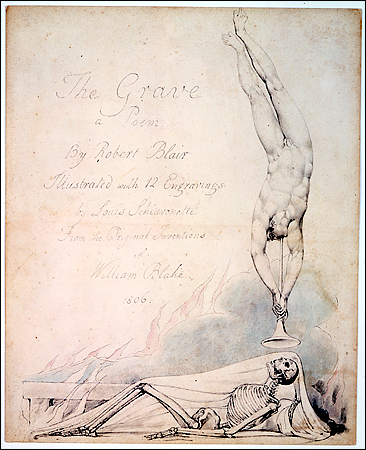
'The Skeleton Reanimated', one of William Blake's illustrations for The Grave

He was the eldest son of the Rev. Robert Blair, one of the king's chaplains, and was born at Edinburgh. He was educated at the University of Edinburgh and in the Netherlands, and in 1731 was appointed minister of Athelstaneford in East Lothian. In 1738, he married Isabella, daughter of Professor William Law, with whom he had six children. His family's wealth gave him leisure for his favourite pursuits: gardening and the study of English poets.

Blair published only three poems. One was a commemoration of his father-in-law and another was a translation. His reputation rests entirely on his third work, The Grave (1743), which is a poem written in blank verse on the subject of death and the graveyard. It is much less conventional than its gloomy title might lead one to expect. Its religious subject no doubt contributed to its great popularity, especially in Scotland, where it gave rise to the so-called "graveyard school" of poetry. The poem extends to 767 lines of various merit, in some passages rising to great sublimity, and in others sinking to commonplace.

The poem is now best known for the illustrations created by William Blake following a commission from Robert Cromek. Blake's designs were engraved by Luigi Schiavonetti, and published in 1808.

See the biographical introduction prefixed to Blair's Poetical Works, by Robert Anderson, in his Poets of Great Britain, vol. viii. (1794). A facsimile edition of The Grave with an introduction by Professor James A. Means was published in 1973 by the Augustan Reprint Society, Los Angeles.

== See also ==
- Scottish literature
