= Chroma ATE =

Taiwanese electronics company

Chroma ATE Inc.
- Company type: Public
- Traded as: TWSE: 2360
- Industry: Testing Equipment
- Founded: November 1984
- Headquarters: Taiwan; 66, Hwa-Ya 1st Road, Hwa-Ya Technology Park, Taoyuan City
- Key people: Chairman/CEO: Leo Huang (Chin Ming Huang)
- Products: Testing Equipment, Automatic Testing Systems, Manufacturing Execution System (MES)
- Revenue: NT$ 16.9 billion (2018)
- Operating income: (2018)
- Net income: NT$ 2.5 billion
- Number of employees: 2,934 (2019) (2019)
- Website: www.chroma.com.tw

Chroma ATE Inc. 致茂電子, is a Taiwanese electronic test and measurement instrumentation company founded in 1984. The company develops and manufactures a range of electronic test and measurement equipment, automated testing equipment (ATE), signal generator, power supplies, and intelligent manufacturing execution systems (MES). The company is part of Taiwan-based conglomerate Chroma Group. The company reported revenues of NT$16.9 billion with net income of NT$2.5 billion in 2018.

== Product Divisions and Testing Solutions ==
Chroma's product divisions develop various automated test systems and automation for the following categories:

- Power Electronics
- LED/Lighting & Drivers
- Electric Vehicles
- Batteries
- Photovoltaics
- Video and Colors
- LCD / LCM
- Automated Optical Inspection
- Passive component and Electrical Safety
- Semiconductor / IC
- Thermoelectric Test & Control
- Manufacturing Execution System (MES)
- VCSEL Testing
- Fabry–Pérot laser and Distributed Feedback Laser Testing
- Solar Cell Testing
- PIN photodiode and Avalanche photodiode Testing

== Operations ==
The company operates a number of engineering service offices worldwide, including in the United States, Europe and Japan, for client service and support.

The company's global network includes the following:

- Chroma USA: Chroma USA (Irvine, CA), Chroma System Solutions (Irvine, CA).
- Chroma Europe: Netherlands
- Chroma Japan: Yokohama.
- Chroma China: Beijing, Nanjing, Shanghai, Suzhou, Chongqing, Xiamen, Shenzhen, Dongguan.
- Chroma Korea: Seongnam

== Associated companies ==
- Innovative Nanotech
- Touch Cloud
- MAS Automative
- Testar Electronis
- ADIVIC Technology
- EVT Technology
- Chroma New Material
- DynaScan Technology

== See also ==
- List of companies in Taiwan
- 致茂電子
