= Cromer (surname) =

Cromer is a surname. Notable people with the surname include:

- D. T. Cromer, (born 1971), American former baseball player
- David Cromer, American stage actor and theatre director
- Don T. Cromer, American radiation physicist, Ernest Orlando Lawrence Award laureate
- George Cromer (died 1543), Archbishop of Armagh and Primate of All Ireland
- George W. Cromer (1856–1936), U.S. Representative from Indiana
- Giulio Cromer (died 1632), an Italian painter
- Greg Cromer (born 1958), American politician
- Ronnie W. Cromer (born 1947), Republican member of the South Carolina Senate
- Tripp Cromer (born 1967), former American Major League baseball player
- Walter Cromer (fl. 1543), Scottish doctor
