= Cromers, Georgia =

Unincorporated community in Georgia, U.S.

Coordinates: 34°16′33″N 83°15′56″W

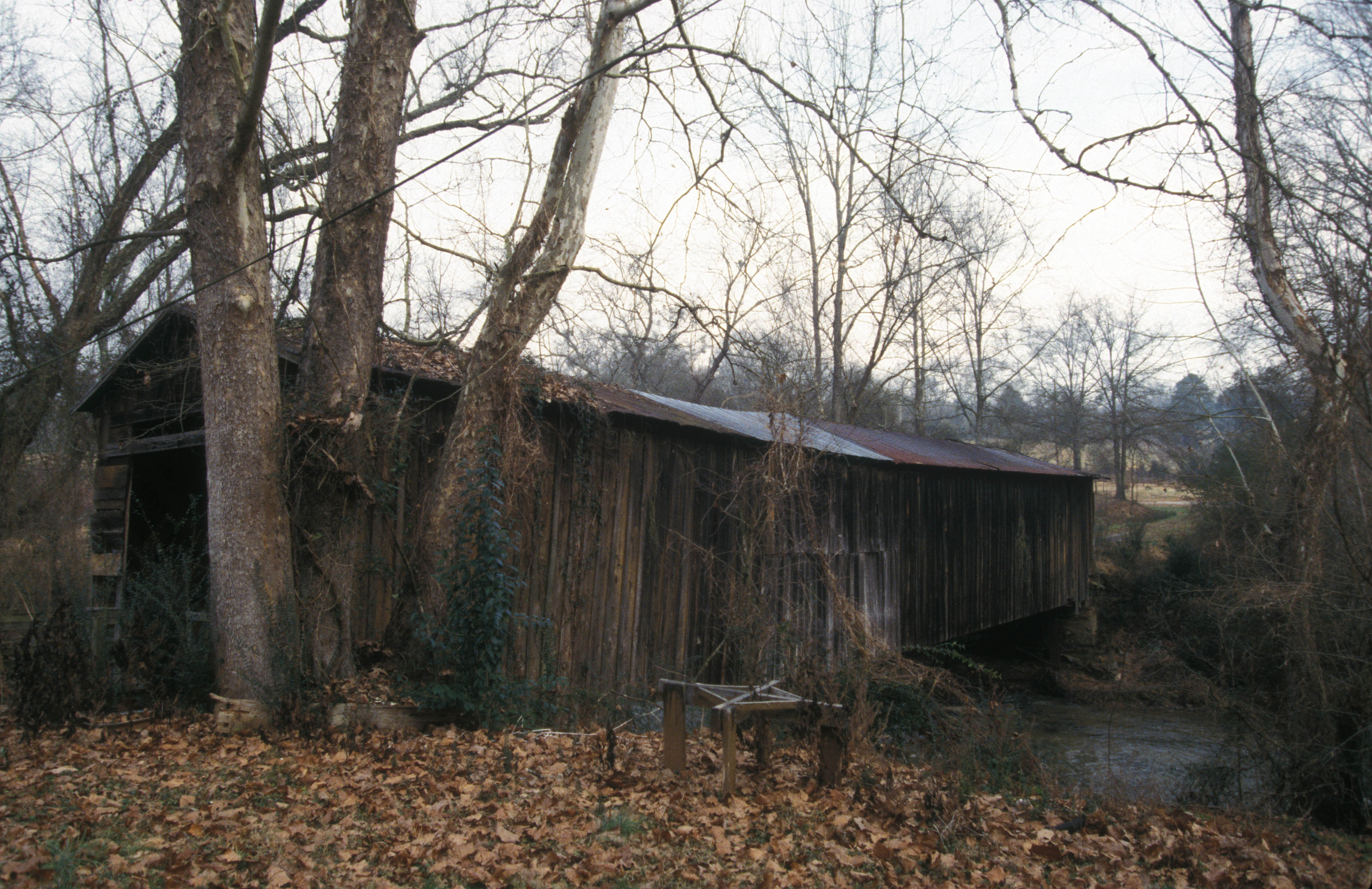
Cromer's Mill Covered Bridge in 2006

Cromers is an unincorporated community in Franklin County, in the U.S. state of Georgia.

== History ==
Variant names were "Cromer" and "Cromer's". A post office called Cromer's was established in 1871, and remained in operation until 1904. The community was named after J. D. Cromer, the proprietor of several local mills.

Nearby Cromer's Mill Covered Bridge is listed on the National Register of Historic Places.
