= Robert Cromek =

English engraver (1770–1812)

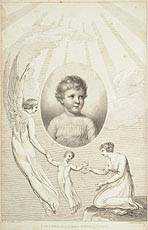
William Blake's frontispiece to A Father's Memoirs of his Child (1806), engraved by Cromek.

Robert Hartley Cromek (1770–1812) was an English engraver, editor, art dealer and entrepreneur who was most active in the early nineteenth century. He is best known for having allegedly cheated William Blake out of the potential profits of his engraving depicting Chaucer's Canterbury Pilgrims.

In the early years of the nineteenth century Cromek had supported Blake, and had engraved Blake's design for Benjamin Heath Malkin's A Father's Memoirs of his Child in 1806. Cromek later commissioned Blake to illustrate Robert Blair's poem The Grave. Blake had produced the designs, but his sample engraving was considered by Cromek to be too crude to attract subscribers. Cromek then gave the lucrative job of engraving Blake's designs to a rival engraver Luigi Schiavonetti.

In response, Blake proceeded to create a self-engraved illustration to Chaucer's Canterbury Tales. Cromek, however, had also given the idea to Blake's friend Thomas Stothard. Stothard's print became far more popular than Blake's, at least during their lifetimes. It remains unclear whether Blake or Cromek originated this project, but Blake certainly believed that the idea was stolen from him. The incident destroyed the friendship between Blake and Stothard.

As a savagely humorous comment on these events Blake wrote epigrams attacking Cromek:

Cromek loves artists as he loves his meat:
He loves the Art; but 'tis the art to cheat.

A petty sneaking knave I knew--
"O! Mr. Cromek, how do ye do?"

In 1809 Cromek published Remains of Nithsdale and Galloway Song, a collection of Scottish ballads. The aspirant poet Allan Cunningham sent in poems of his own authorship, which Cromek included in the collection, even though he may have suspected their real authorship.

About that time Cromek also compiled "RELIQUES OF ROBERT BURNS; Consisting Chiefly of Original Letters, Poems, and Critical Observations on Scottish Songs ". The original edition of 1808 contained a 4-page work by Thomas Stothard, "The Procession of Chaucer's Pilgrims to Canterbury", which did not appear in some later editions.

His son was the artist Thomas Hartley Cromek.
