= Hannah Mather Crocker =

Hannah Mather Crocker (June 27, 1752 – July 11, 1829) was an American essayist, poet, and historian. She was an early advocates of women's rights in America, and a pioneer for women's participation in Freemasonry. Her memoir and history of Massachusetts, The Reminisces and Traditions of Boston (1828), is the first known history of the American Revolution to be published in America, and her Observations on the Real Rights of Women (1818) was the first book-length philosophical treatise on women's rights to be published by an American.

== Early life and family ==
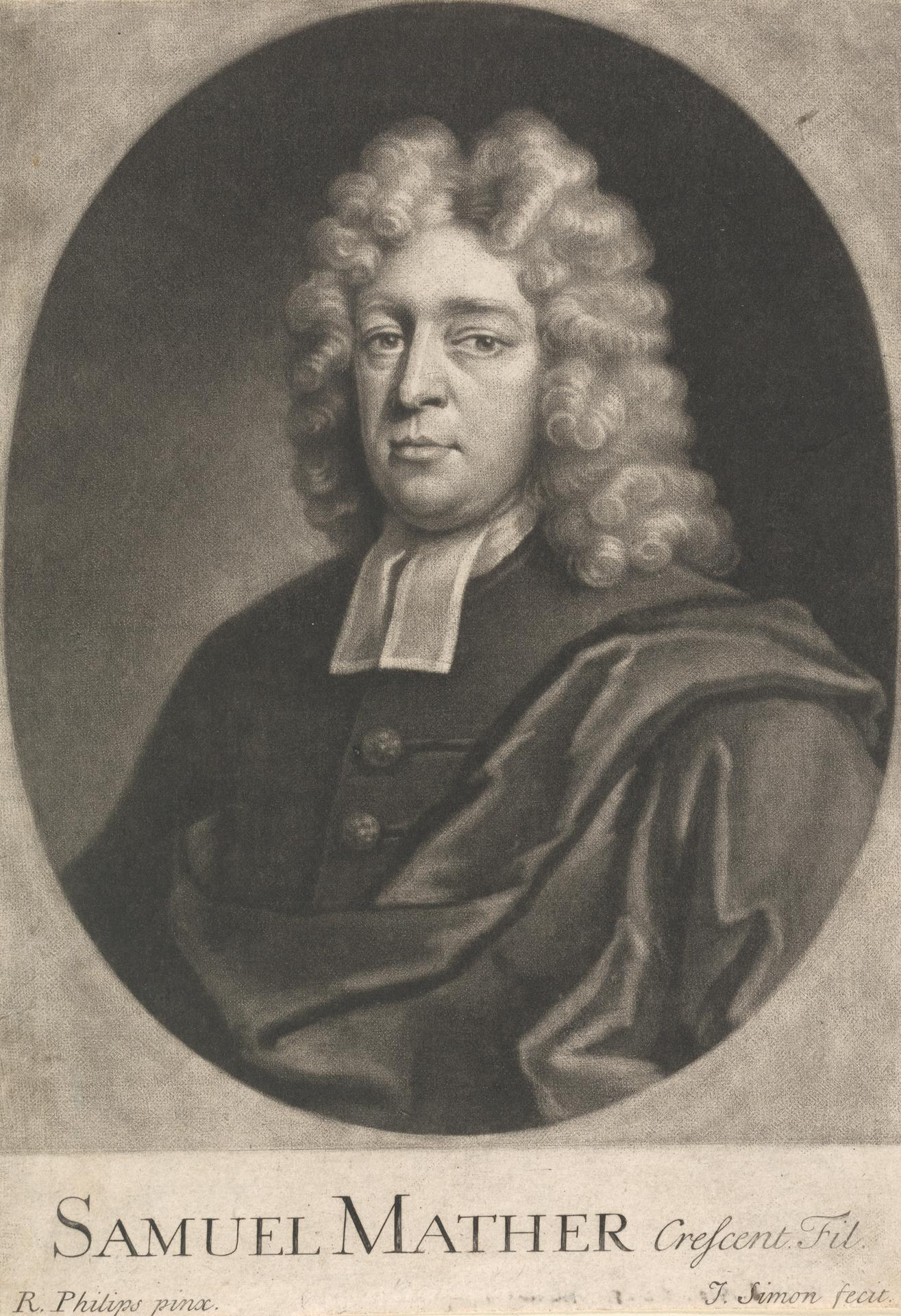
Crocker's father, Samuel Mather, was a prominent Puritan minister.

Hannah Mather Crocker born in Roxbury, Massachusetts, on June 27, 1752. She was the daughter of Samuel Mather, a Congregationalist minister, and Hannah Hutchinson. She was a descendant of the Mather dynasty founded in New England by Richard Mather (1596–1669), through his son Increase Mather (1639–1723) and his grandson Cotton Mather (1663-1728), all prominent Puritan ministers involved in the important religious and political issues of their era, including the Salem Witch Trials, the 1689 Revolt against Governor Edmund Andros, and the controversy over vaccination against smallpox. Her mother's brother was Thomas Hutchinson, Governor of the Province of Massachusetts Bay in the years preceding the American Revolution. She was a descendant of Anne Hutchinson (1591-1643), a female preacher famous for being exiled from Massachusetts for heresy.

Crocker was raised in the Puritan tradition, and held strong Protestant beliefs throughout her life, later becoming an advocate for Universalist theology. Like many Puritans, Crocker's father Samuel Mather was both highly educated, and believed in the importance of women's education. As a result, Crocker was extensively educated from a young age in languages, history, theology, and literature, and grew up with access to the Mather family's library, one of the largest private libraries in New England. These factors may account for Hannah's unusual level of literacy and education for a woman of her time.

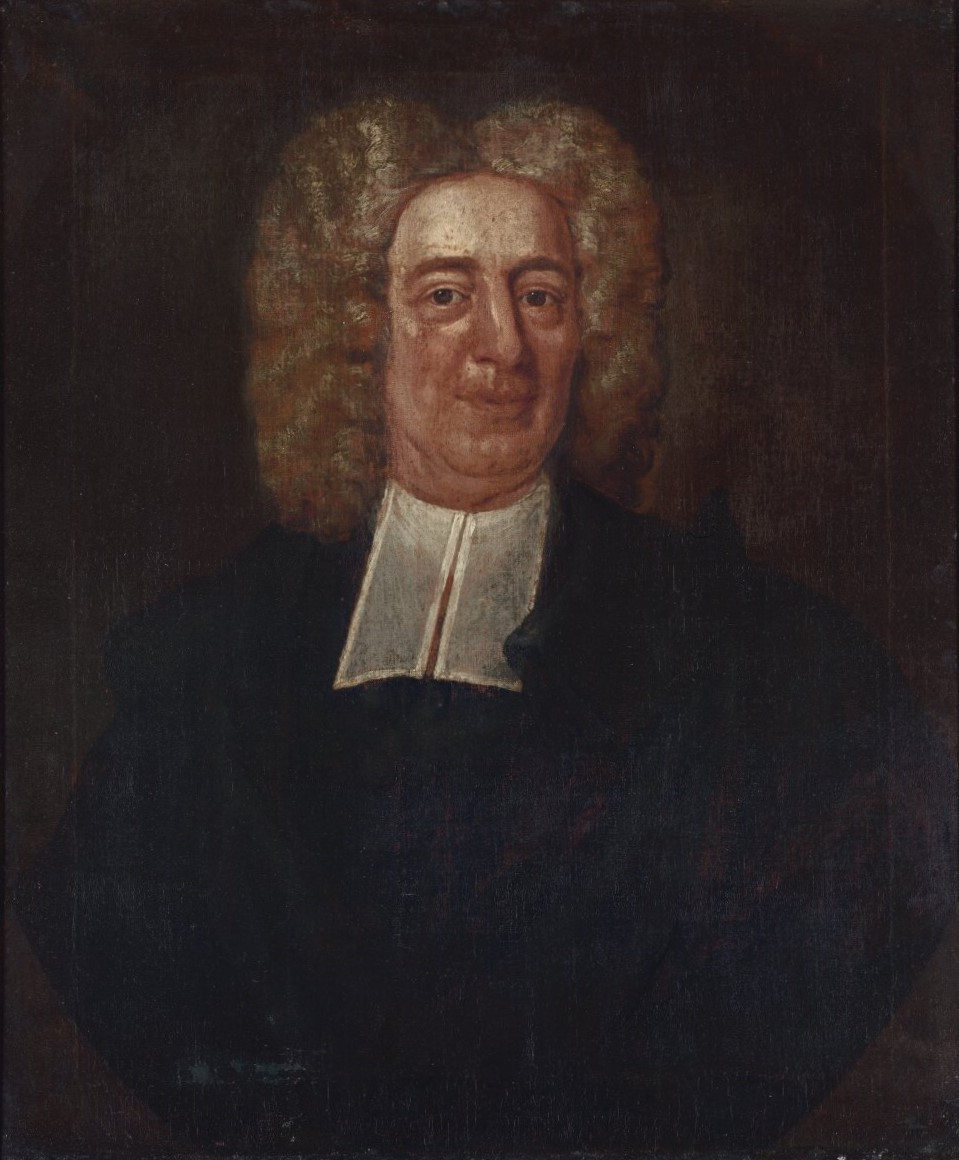
Crocker's famous grandfather, Cotton Mather

For most of her childhood, Crocker resided in North Square in Boston. During the Siege of Boston, she briefly evacuated the city, while her father and mother remained behind in British-occupied Boston as hostages. During this time, she resided with a cousin in Dorchester. She later returned to and continued to reside in her family estate.

== American Revolution ==
Hannah Mather Crocker was a witness to the sacking of her uncle Thomas Hutchinson's mansion during the Stamp Act Riots when she was 13 years old. According to her memoir, she helped her uncle flee a mob of rioters by smuggling him out the back entrance of her family's house to the house of a sympathetic neighbor.

Crocker was 22 years old when war broke out in Boston in 1775. In the first few weeks of the Revolutionary War, she smuggled letters from her father out of British-occupied Boston and delivered them to Dr. Joseph Warren, a leader of the rebel forces. She also claimed in her memoir to have spoken with Dr. Warren in Charlestown the night before his death in the Battle of Bunker Hill, and to have served as a nurse in the same battle as a nurse alongside Dr. Warren's student, Dr. William Eustace.

Much of Crocker's experiences during the Revolutionary War are recounted in her posthumously published history of Massachusetts, The Reminisces and Traditions of Boston (1828).

== Later years and death ==
On 18 March 1779, she married Joseph Crocker, a graduate of Harvard College and a captain in the Revolutionary War. He was also an advocate for women's rights. They had ten children between 1780 and 1795.

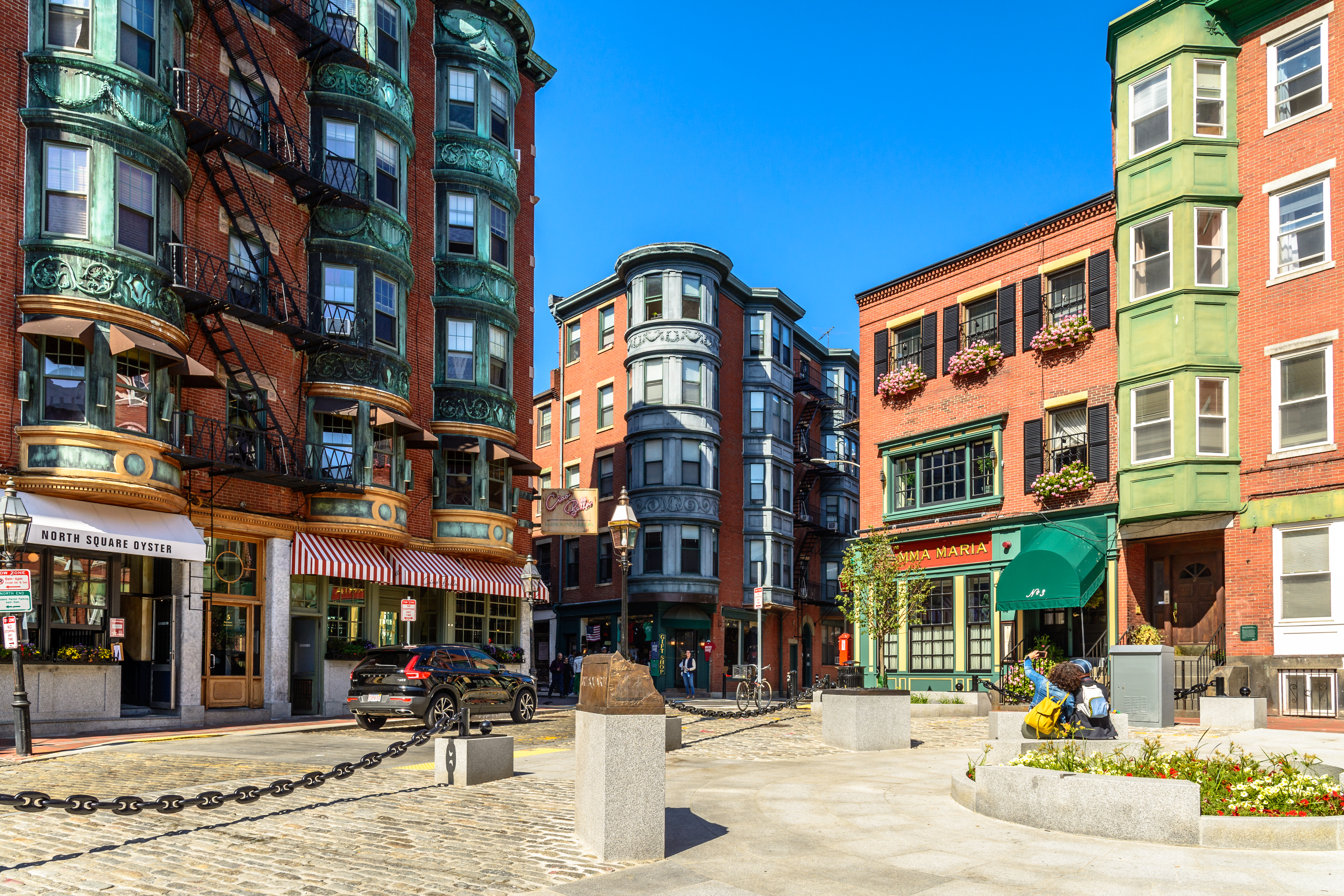
A present-day view of North Square in Boston where Crocker resided for most of her life

Upon her father's death, Crocker inherited the remainder of the Mather family estate, including the family's library and various artifacts related to her famous ancestors. Though she did not inherit much by way of cash, by selling off or donating portions of this library and collection, she was able to barter for access to some of the leading academic and antiquarian institutions of Massachusetts at the time, including the American Antiquarian Society and Massachusetts Historical Society. She eventually willed the Mather Library, along with her own manuscripts, to the American Antiquarian Society, where they remain today.

In her later years, Crocker became a prolific writer and well-known essayist and poet. Her political affiliation was always with the Federalist Party. In 1812 she founded the School of Industry to provide instruction in vocational skills for "the female children of the poor in the Northern district of Boston". (Note: The School of Industry closed in 1819, replaced by the public school system of Boston.) She died in Dorchester, Massachusetts, on July 11, 1829, and was interred in the Mather family tomb in Copp's Hill Burying Ground in Boston's North End.

== Freemasonry ==
Both Hannah Mather Crocker's father, Samuel Mather, and her husband, Joseph Crocker, were active freemasons and involved with St. Andrew's Lodge in Boston. During her marriage to Joseph, Crocker authored a number of tracts, poems, and songs in support of freemasonry, including A Series of Letters on Freemasonry. In her writings, Crocker praised masonry for its promotion of democratic values and education. Crocker also frequently used masonic references in her publications.

Crocker was also an active advocate for women's participation in freemasonry. She founded the St. Anne's Lodge, an all-female organization guided by masonic principles to provide women with instruction in literature and science. Through this lodge, Crocker helped to pioneer the 19th century trend of "women's reading circles" by sharing her resources and literacy with other women who may otherwise have had difficulty accessing books or an education. Crocker also satirized male lodges in a number of poems and songs for their hypocrisy in promoting equality but not allowing female members.

In 1787 she authored the North Square Creed, written in the style of a pledge taken by a new member of a fraternal organization. It is thought to have been written as a pledge to allow husbands of the women who joined St. Anne's Lodge to commit themselves to certain principles to guarantee their wives agency and rights within marriage. A remaining copy of the North Square Creed is signed with the initials "J.C.", potentially the initials of her husband, Joseph Crocker.

== Writings ==
Hannah Mather Crocker authored and published a number of books and tracts under her own name, and ghost-wrote and published numerous essays, sermons, and poems under various pseudonyms including ‘‘Prudencia A Matron," "An Original Antiquarian," and "Increase Mather Jr. of the Inner Temple." Most of her prominent writings were published in her later years, after her children had grown up and she had inherited the Mather family estate, leaving her with both the leisure and resources to publish. In her will, she made major contributions from the Mather library to the American Antiquarian Society, under the condition that the society would also maintain her personal papers and manuscripts.

=== Observations on the Real Rights of Women ===
In 1818, Crocker published Observations on the Real Rights of Women, with Their Appropriate Duties, Agreeable to Scripture, Reason and Common Sense in Boston in 1818. This book's title would have been understood by readers at the time as a nod to A Vindication of the Rights of Woman by the British feminist Mary Wollstonecraft, who was a controversial figure in Boston at the time. Although some historians have argued that Crocker was more moderate in her insistence of women's right to speak govern and speak in the public sphere than Wollstonecraft, Crocker's book generally extends Wollstonecraft's arguments in support of women's rights to political participation and education. Crocker argued that men and women were equal in mental capacity, though allowed for different expressions according to gender:

...although there must be allowed some moral and physical distinction of the sexes agreeably to the order of nature, still the sentiment must predominate that the powers of the mind are equal in the sexes.... There can be no doubt that there is as much difference of the powers of each individual of the male sex as there is of the female; and if they received the same mode of education their improvement would be fully equal.

Crocker also grounded her advocacy for women's rights in a religious discourse of republican motherhood, arguing that "It must be women's prerogative to shine in the domestic circle and her appropriate duty to teach and regulate the opening mind of her little flock.... The surest foundation to secure the female's right, must be in family government." She also extended religious arguments for women's equality, arguing that sex is a trait of the body but not the soul, and that since women are responsible for the spiritual health of the community, they are also entitled to spiritual education. Drawing on a tradition established by 18th century feminist writers including Wollstonecraft, Crocker supported her argument with historical examples of virtuous political participation by women taken from antiquity, including her own namesake, the biblical Hannah.

The Reminisces and Traditions of Boston

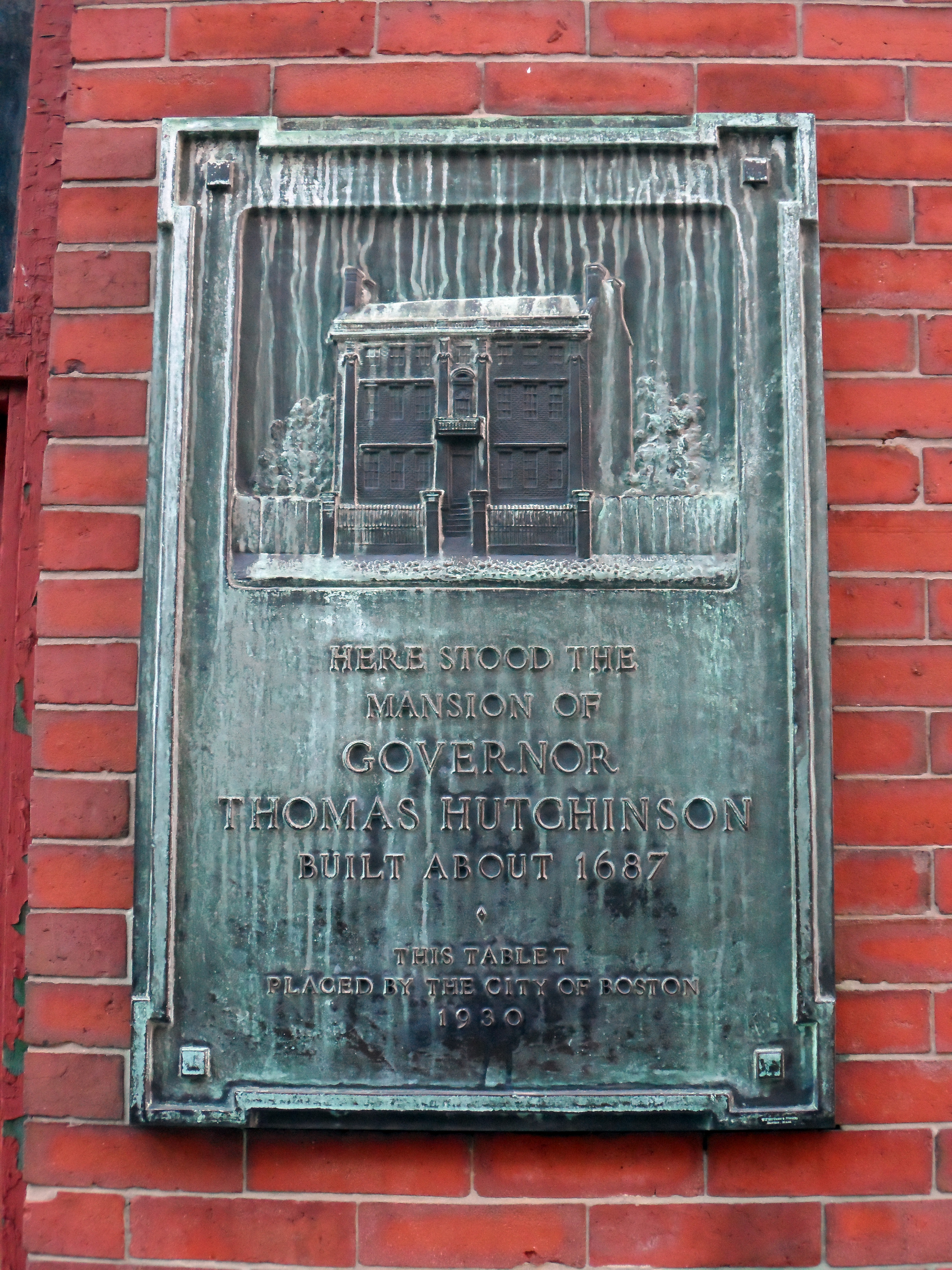
Crocker witnessed the destruction of her uncle, Thomas Hutchinson's mansion in the Stamp Act Riots when she was 13 years old.

Between 1822 and 1829, she both described and analyzed the events of the American Revolution, titled the Reminiscences and Traditions of Boston, which she willed to the collection of the American Antiquarian Society. The first half of the book is written as a first person memoir and history which describes the Boston of Crocker's childhood and analyzes the events of the American Revolution. The manuscript chronicles several major events of the American Revolution including the Stamp Act Riots, Boston Tea Party, and Battle of Bunker Hill. Crocker's manuscript anticipated some argument now commonly accepted by scholars about the role of Boston's tradition of egalitarian governance and popular political participation in inciting the American Revolution. For example, she argued that the Stamp Act Riots employed tactics from Boston's tradition of anti-Catholic parades, including ritual acts of violence and the burning of effigies, an argument now commonly advanced by modern scholars.

The second half of the Reminisces and Traditions of Boston is a collection of newspaper clippings, poems, and letters "extracted from public papers for juvinal instruction, amusement, and improvement for the rising generation." Some of the poems and letters included were Crocker's own work, and many were writings by contemporary female poets including Sarah Kemble Knight, Phyllis Wheatley, and Sarah Parsons Moorhead, and Jane Coleman Turell.

The unpublished manuscript was later acquired by the New England Historic Genealogical Society in 1879, which published a modern annotated edition in 2011.

=== Other works ===
Crocker's other works include: A Series of Letters on Free Masonry Antiquarian Researches, Pleasant and Easy, and The School of Reform; or, Seaman's Safe Pilot to the Cape of Good Hope. She also wrote a satirical play, The Midnight Beau.

In the 1810s, Crocker recorded four sermons (two of which she preached publicly) opposing the War of 1812. She also authored an abolitionist sermon in 1813, and decried slavery in a number of her other works.
