= Joseph Green (poet) =

American poet (1706–1780)

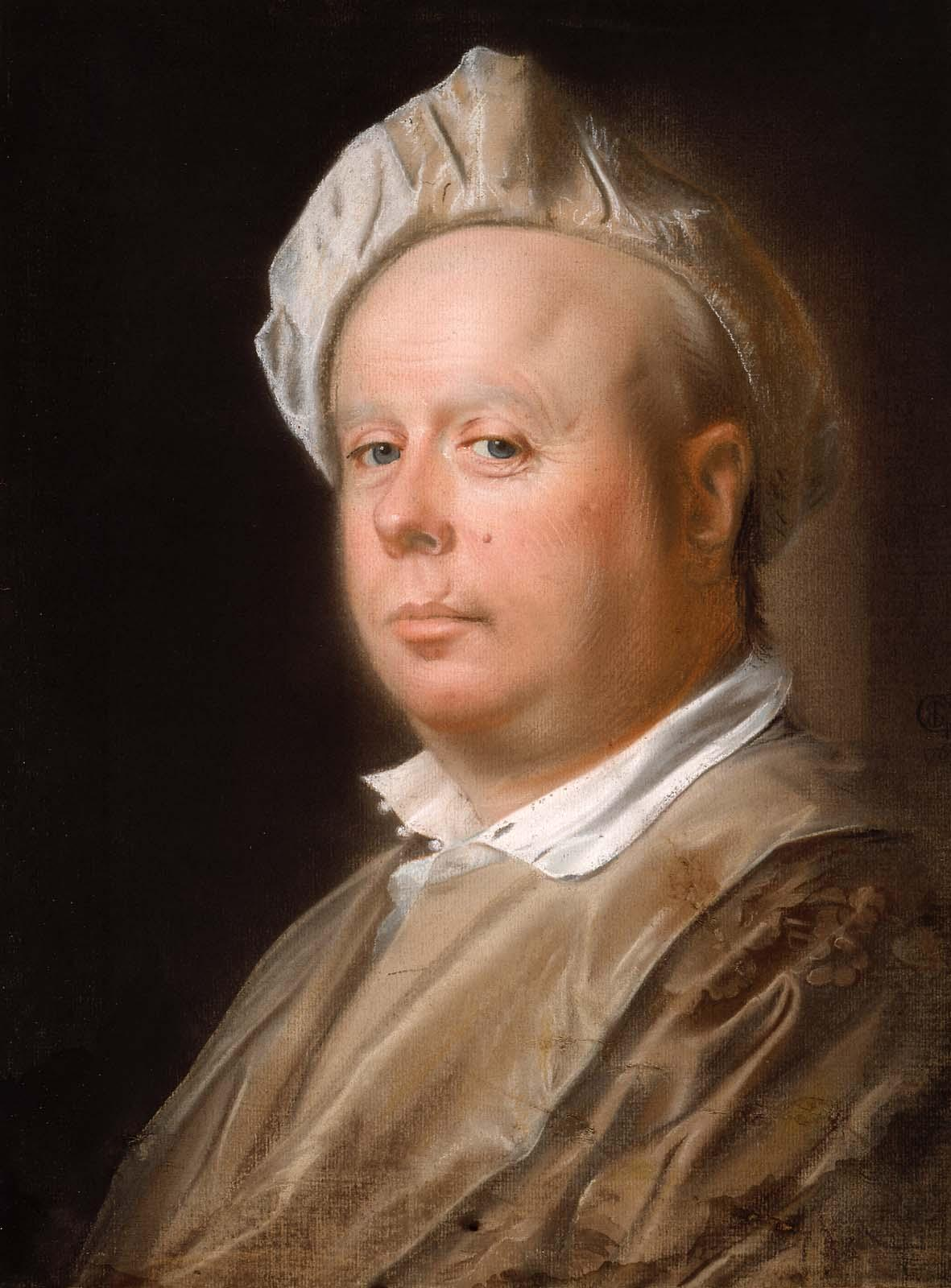
- portrait by John Singleton Copley
- Born: 1706; Boston
- Died: December 11, 1780; London
- Education: Harvard University
- Occupations: Writer, parson

Joseph Green (1706 – December 11, 1780) was an American clergyman and poet who published The Disappointed Cooper in 1743, mocking an old man's marriage to a much younger woman as well as criticizing the behavior of some New Light ministers.

== Biography ==
Joseph Green was born in Boston, Province of Massachusetts Bay, in 1706. He graduated from Harvard University in 1726, and became a successful businessman.

He has been called "the foremost wit of his day." He often exchanged parodies and satiric poems with another Boston wit, Mather Byles.

Joseph Green's satirical poetry includes "To Mr. B Occasioned by His Verse" and "To Mr. Smibert on Seeing His Pictures". He also wrote "The Poet's Lamentation for the Loss of his Cat, which he us'd to call his Muse", "On Mr. B—s's singing an Hymn of his own composing", "To the Author of the Poetry in the last Weekly Journal", "A True Impartial Account of the Celebration of the Prince of Orange's Nuptials at Portsmouth", "Inscription under Revd. Jn. Checkley's Picture", "A fig for your learning, I tell you the Town" and "Hail! D––p––t of wondrous fame".

His "Entertainment for a Winter's Evening" is a satire on Boston's first Masonic procession, held in 1749.

Green was one of the members who signed the attestation of veracity regarding Phillis Wheatley's authorship of Poems on Various Subjects, Religious and Moral.

A Loyalist, Green fled from North America to England during the American Revolution and was named in the Massachusetts Banishment Act of 1778. He died in London on December 11, 1780. In his will, he left 100 pounds to his slave, Plato.
