= Benjamin Colman =

American minister (1673–1747)

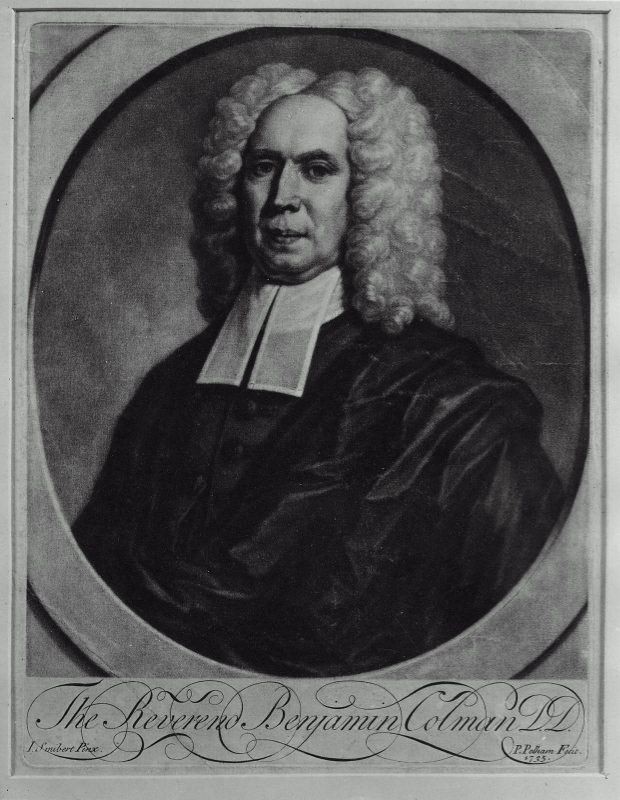
- Born: October 19, 1673; Boston
- Died: August 29, 1747 (aged 73); Boston
- Occupation: Minister
- Children: Jane Turell

Rev. Benjamin Colman (October 19, 1673 – August 29, 1747) was a Congregationalist minister affiliated with the Brattle Street Church in Boston.

== Biography ==
Coat of Arms of Benjamin Colman

On October 19, 1673, Benjamin Colman was born in Boston, he was the second son of William Colman and Elizabeth Colman. He enrolled in Harvard College in 1688, and from there he received a degree of Bachelor of Arts in 1692. The next year, 1693, was when Colman began to preach publicly. In 1695 he would receive a degree of Master of Arts.

Just three weeks after receiving his second degree, Colman boarded a ship by the name of Swayne towards London. At the time there was a war between England and France, and after two months in sea, the ship was chased by a French privateer near the coast of France, Swayne surrendered to France and the people on board were transferred to the deck of the privateer. The people on Swayne were robbed of their money. Colman was then sent to Nantes and later to Dinan as a prisoner. After around two months, an exchange of prisoners between France and England took place and Colman was sent to Portsmouth. Before leaving Swayne, a female passenger had concealed 19 pounds worth of gold, owned by Colman, which he got back in Nantes, and so he was able to afford his trip to London.

=== 1694–1699 in England ===
The first night in London was depressing for Colman, because he had lost all his letters from New England in France. Nevertheless, he found the people he was supposed to meet there and was appointed to Cambridge to lead a small congregation. From there he was appointed to the town of Ipswich in Suffolk where he spent eleven weeks and then returned to London. When in London, he was given the opportunity to take charge of a church in Bath, Somerset. He stayed there for two years.

=== 1699–1747 in Boston ===
In the summer of 1699 Colman received a letter from New England requesting him to return to Boston and become the minister of the new church there. Colman went to London on August 1, 1699 and left from Gravesend on a voyage to New England on August 20. He arrived in Boston on November 1. He began working as the minister of the Brattle Street Church in Boston, a position he would hold until his death. Colman married Jane Clark on June 5, 1700.

In 1724 Colman was elected to succeed John Leverett as the president of Harvard University, but Colman declined the offer. In 1731 Colman received an honorary degree of Doctor in Divinity from the University of Glasgow. Colman's wife, Jane would die on October 26, 1731, and Colman would marry thrice widowed Sarah Clark on May 6, 1732, who he would be married with until her death on April 24, 1744. He would then marry Mary Frost on August 12, 1745.

Colman died on August 29, 1747 in Boston.
