= Scipio Moorhead =

African-American artist

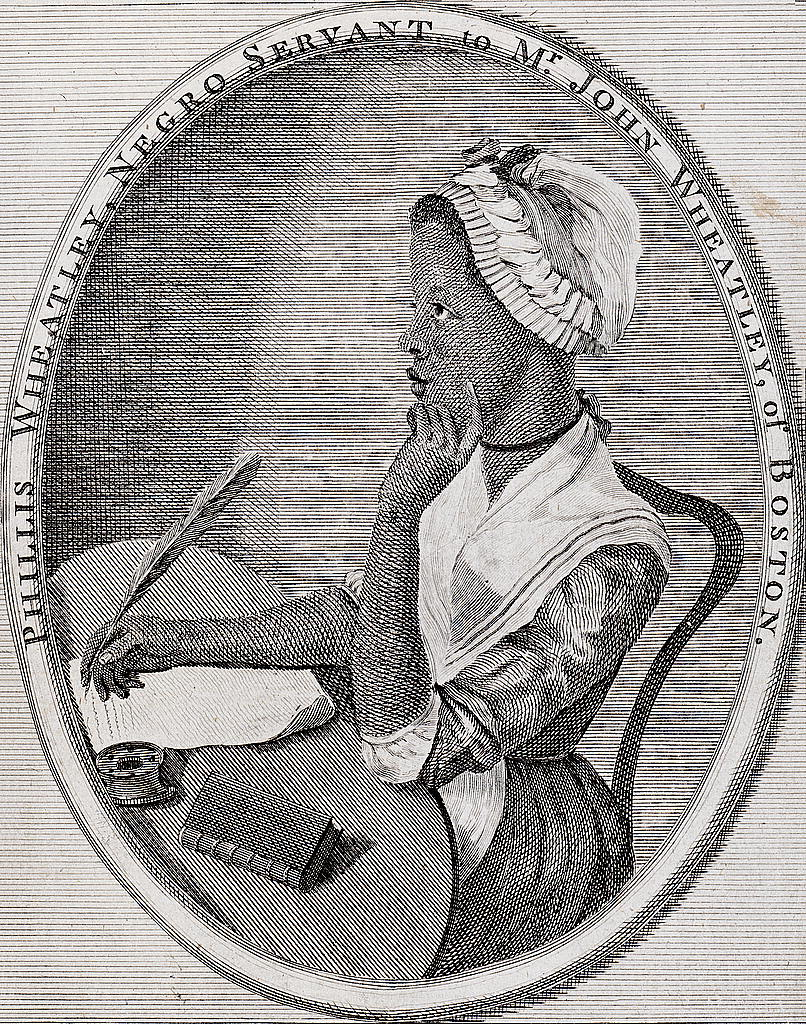
Phillis Wheatley, possibly based on a portrait by Scipio Moorhead, in the frontispiece to her book Poems on Various Subjects.

Scipio Moorhead (active c. 1773 – after 1775) was an enslaved African-American artist who lived in Boston, Massachusetts. Moorhead is known through the contemporary African-American poet Phillis Wheatley's poem, dedicated "To S. M. a young African Painter, on seeing his Works", published in Poems on Various Subjects, Religious and Moral, 1773. Though the poem does it not mention Moorhead's full name, it is significantly Wheatley’s only surviving poem addressed to another black person, and it is also her only poem explicitly about artistic creation. Moorhead's full name was identified from period marginalia.

Moorhead was enslaved by Reverend John Moorhead of Boston, Massachusetts. Though his birthdate is unknown, it is possible that he was the black child called Scipio Sarahson baptized by an Anglican Minister in Boston on 11 June 1760. If so, Moorhead would have been about five years younger than Wheatley, making sense of her designation of him as a "young" African painter.

Scipio Moorhead's drawing talents were likely tutored by the reverend's wife Sarah Moorhead, who was an art teacher. Although enslaved, Scipio Moorhead enjoyed some workers' freedoms. No original work by Scipio has survived, but he may be the person referred to by a Boston News-Letter advertisement on January 7, 1773, which spoke of a "negro artist... A negro of extraordinary genius."

It is possible that the copperplate engraving of Phillis Wheatley that adorns much of her published poetry is his creation. In the 19th century Wheatley's fame was revived by Massachusetts abolitionists and many stories about her were recovered through oral history, but Moorhead was never mentioned, so the attribution to him is uncertain; it was first publicly suggested by the Wheatley scholar William H. Robinson in 1984. However, it has been recognized that the portrait is highly unusual. It resembles contemporary portraits by the famous Bostonian painter John Singleton Copley, but unlike any of Copley's work, it portrays a woman writing a poem deep in thought. The novelty of the portrait was recognized and imitated by Bostonian printers when it was engraved for an edition of Wheatley's poetry in 1773, but the artist's name was never mentioned. It is the first frontispiece depicting a woman writer in American history, and possibly the first ever portrait of an American woman in the act of writing.

Scipio was auctioned in January 1775 as part of an estate sale. The advertised location of the slave auction, near the Liberty Tree, was deplored by the 19th-century abolition movement. In the 1780s, enslaved Massachusettsans successfully sued for freedom which led to a general abolition, but it is unknown if Scipio was ever freed, as his buyer was unrecorded and no record of his whereabouts after 1775 has been located.

== Legacy and Historical Significance ==
Scipio Moorhead’s artistic presence in colonial Boston is documented through Phillis Wheatley’s 1773 poetry, which references his paintings and suggests a shared creative exchange. Scholars have proposed that his artistic training may have been supported by Sarah Moorhead, an art teacher and wife of Reverend John Moorhead, who is believed to have owned Scipio. Although no signed works survive, some researchers speculate that Moorhead may have engraved Wheatley’s portrait for her published book. His visibility as an enslaved artist challenges assumptions about Black creative absence in early America and contributes to broader discussions of African diasporic aesthetics.

In 2007, Kerry James Marshall painted "Scipio Moorhead, Portrait of Himself 1776", a painting that fabricates a likeness of Moorhead to counter its absence in the historical record.

== See also ==
- List of enslaved people
