= Sarah Parsons Moorhead =

American poet and polemicist

- Known for: Poet; Polemicist
- Notable work: To the Reverend James Davenport on His Departure from Boston by Way of a Dream
- Spouse: Rev. John Moorhead
- Children: Mary Moorhead

Sarah Parsons Moorhead (died December 1774) was an American poet, artist, and polemicist active during the Great Awakening in the 18th century. Her poems critique the itinerant ministers of the Great Awakening and demonstrate the emergence of women's voices during that time.

== Biography ==
Moorhead was married to the Rev. John Moorhead of Boston. John Moorhead was pastor of the Scotch Presbyterian Church in Boston. Together they had at least one child, a daughter called Mary, to whom Phillis Wheatley's poem An Elegy to Miss Mary Moorhead is addressed. Sarah Parsons Moorhead's surviving poems reveal that she was living in writing in Boston during the 1740s. Her utilisation of the heroic couplet and her ability to critique contemporary religious events suggest she had a substantial religious and literary education. She condemns itinerant ministers who travelled to revitalise local congregations.

== Writing ==
Moorhead's poetic writing is representative of the style of the time. She utilises florid language, recognising that this would make her arguments more palatable to readers. The publication of women's works in 1740s New England was an uncommon occurrence, and Moorhead's published works served a purpose above simple literary enrichment. It suggests that women's critiques on religion and current affairs were respected at the time.

Lines ... Humbly Dedicated to the Rev. Hilbert Tennant, signed by Mrs. Sarah Moorhead and most likely written by Moorhead, was published in the New England Weekly Journal in March 1741. It expresses concern at the excesses of the Great Awakening: "dear sacred Tennant, pray beware, / Least too much terror, prove to some a snare."

To the Reverend James Davenport on His Departure from Boston by Way of a Dream (1742) consists of two poems depicting the controversy that occurred surrounding Reverend James Davenport's religious opinions and practices. Moorhead's criticism focusses on the extremism and hypocrisy of the Great Awakening. Moorhead criticises Davenport's attacks on the devotion and sincerity of local ministers, along with his extreme emotionalism. Her poem features a dream vision depicting Davenport's entrance into Heaven, and his subsequent plea for pardon from the churches that he carelessly influenced. Moorhead is not completely critical and does praise Davenport's "zeal", his qualities and contributions as a clergyman. A postscript to the poem also scolds controversial itinerant clergyman Andrew Croswell for his criticisms of the settled clergy.

Moorhead depicts Puritans' difficulty of distinguishing between moral action and faith. She condemns churchgoers who remain "immers'd in the black Gulph of sin, / ... Pleas'd with the fancy'd Freedom of their Will." She believed that the only way to salvation was through free grace. She was concerned at the division of congregations, and urged New England churches to unite against external opposition. Her criticism of the local clergy is significant as it was published whilst the events were occurring, meaning that a woman was could be considered a worthy critic of contemporaneous events in the 1740s.

== Art teacher ==
In the April 18, 1748 issue of the Boston Evening Post, Moorhead advertised herself as a teacher of "drawing, japanning, and painting on glass." Moorhead's name was found on the liner of an 18th century needlework picture, indicating that she may have designed the image for her needlework students. She may have provided art instruction to Scipio Moorhead, an enslaved African-American painter owned by the Moorheads who may have created the only known image of poet Phyllis Wheatley.

== Works ==
- Lines ... Humbly Dedicated to the Rev. Gilbert Tennant (1741)
- To the Reverend James Davenport on His Departure from Boston by Way of a Dream: With a Line to the Scoffers at Religion Who Makes an Ill Improvement of His Naming Out Our Worthy Ministers (1742)
