= Mather Byles =

American poet

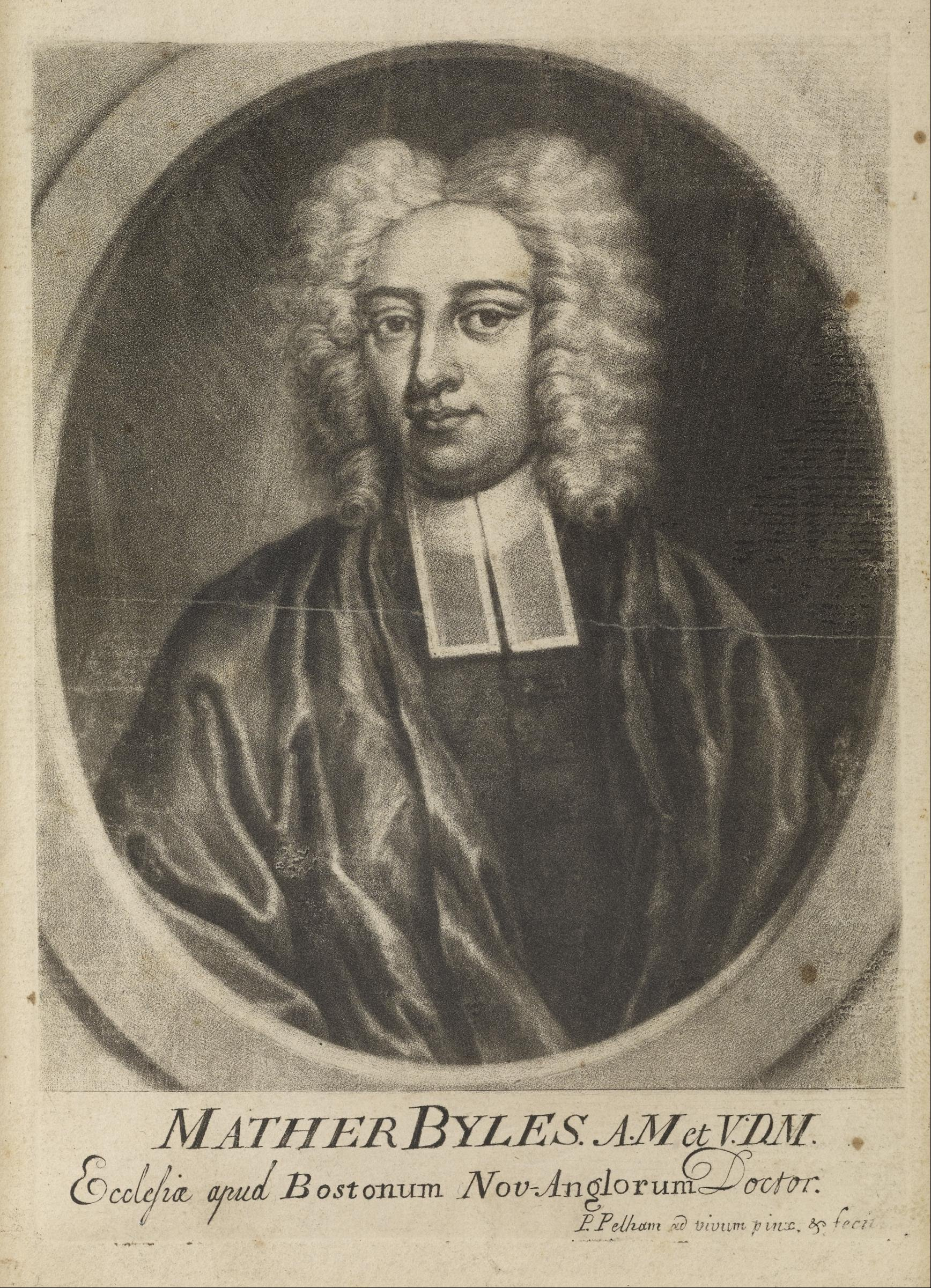
Engraving of Mather Byles by Peter Pelham (1732–1739)

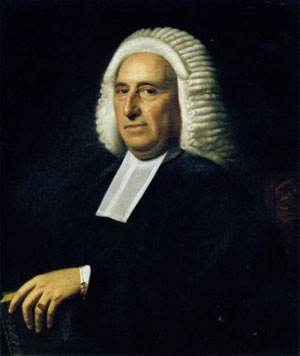
Portrait of Byles by John Singleton Copley

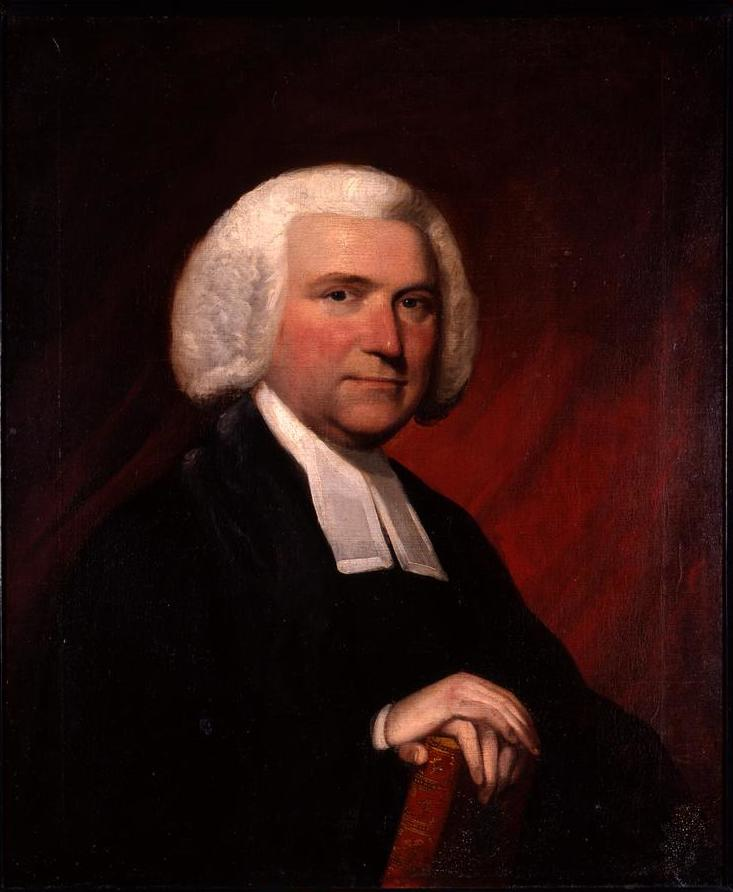
Portrait of Mather Byles II (1734-35-1814), son of Mather Byles painted by his nephew Mather Brown.

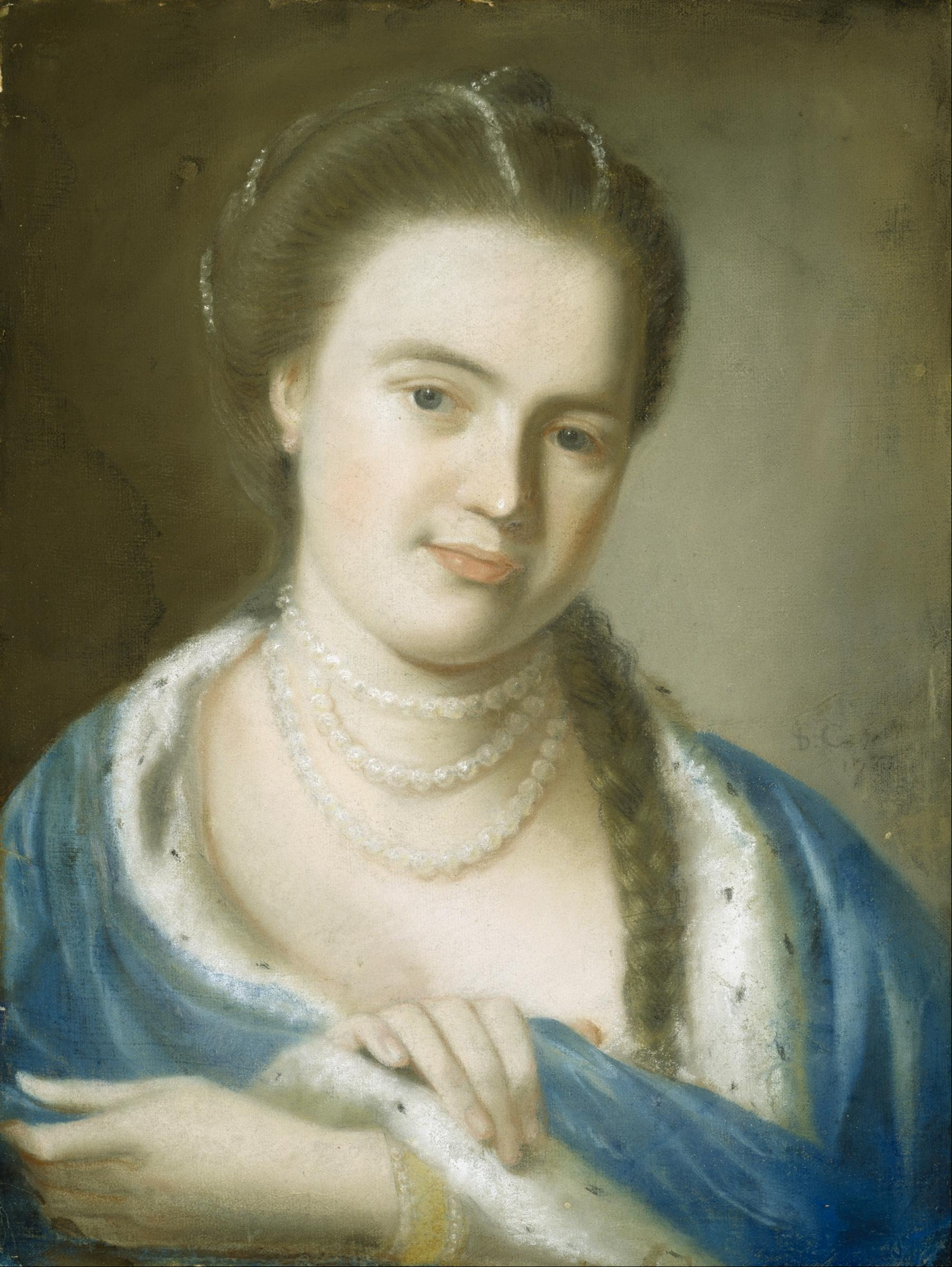
Mrs. Gawen Brown

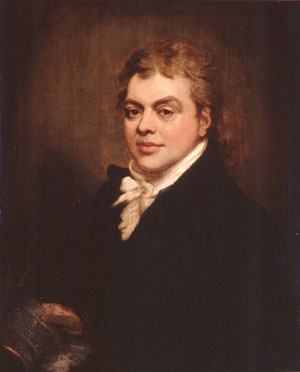
Mather Brown self portrait

Mather Byles (born 26 March 1706 – 5 July 1788) was an American clergyman active in North America.

== Biography ==
Byles was descended, on his mother's side, from John Cotton and Richard Mather, and was a grandson of Increase Mather and nephew of Cotton Mather. As a young man, he corresponded with Alexander Pope and Isaac Watts.

He graduated at Harvard University in 1725, received his A.M. degree there in 1728 and in 1733 he became pastor of the Hollis Street Church (Congregational), Boston. In 1765 he received a degree of Doctor of Divinity from the University of Aberdeen.

Byles held a high rank among the clergy of the province and was noted for his scholarly and well-written sermons, as well as his ready wit. He often exchanged poetic satires and parodies with another Boston wit of that time, Joseph Green. At state funerals, he was often a picked to give the sermon.

He published a book of verse, Poems on Various Occasions in 1744. In 1773, he was chosen to be one of the eminent Boston literary intellectuals to examine Phillis Wheatley in order to determine if the black woman was actually the author of a proposed book of poems. (He and the rest of the panel determined that she was.)

At the outbreak of the American Revolution, Byles was outspoken in his advocacy of the royal cause, and after the British evacuation of Boston his connection with his church was dissolved.

Byles remained in Boston, however, and subsequently (1777) was arrested, tried and sentenced to deportation. This sentence was later changed to imprisonment in his own house. (He called the sentry stationed outside the house his "Observe-a-Tory".) He was soon released, but never resumed his pastorate.

Byles died in Boston on July 5, 1788, aged 82.

== In popular culture ==
He is known for saying "Which is better - to be ruled by one tyrant three thousand miles away or by three thousand tyrants one mile away?" A variation of the quote is spoken by Mel Gibson in The Patriot.

Besides many sermons Byles published A Poem on the Death of George I (1727).

== Personal life ==
Married twice:

1. February 14, 1733 Anna [Noyes] Gale (April 17, 1704 – April 27, 1744); she was a niece of Governor Jonathan Belcher
2. June 11, 1747 Rebecca (died July 23, 1779), daughter of Massachusetts acting Governor William Tailer

By first marriage-he had six children of whom only three lived:

1. Mather Byles (January 12, 1734/1735 – March 12, 1814), married 1st to cousin Rebecca Walter daughter of Rev Nathaniel Walter; 2nd Sarah Lyde; 3rd Mrs Susanna Reid [Widow].
2. Elizabeth (March 22, 1737 – June 6, 1763), married to Gwan Brown; parents of Mather Brown (October 7, 1761 – May 25, 1831), a portrait painter who studied under Benjamin West (Gwan Brown married as his third wife Susannah Hill-the widow of Dr. Joseph Adams (a brother of Samuel Adams).
3. Dr Samuel (1743 – June 16, 1764)

By second marriage-three children of whom only two lived:

1. Joseph – died young
2. Mary (1750 – October 1, 1832)
3. Catherine (1753 – July 19, 1837)

Both Mary and Catherine remained spinsters; they became renowned for maintaining themselves as loyalists in Boston for nearly sixty years after the American Revolution.
