= Poems on Various Subjects, Religious and Moral =

1773 poetry collection by Phillis Wheatley

Poems on Various Subjects, Religious and Moral by Phillis Wheatley
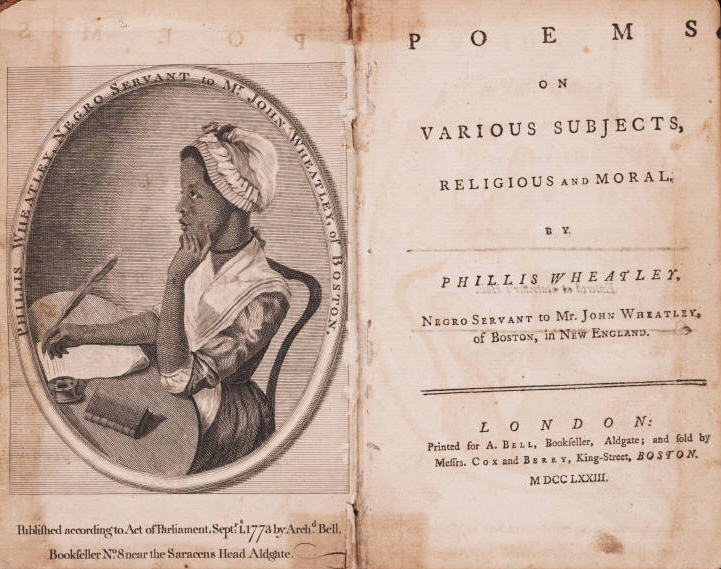
- Title page and frontispiece of the 1st edition
- Author: Phillis Wheatley
- Language: English
- Subject: various
- Publisher: A. Bell, Aldgate, London
- Publication date: 1 September 1773
- Publication place: England
- Pages: 124
- Text: Poems on Various Subjects, Religious and Moral by Phillis Wheatley at Wikisource

Poems on Various Subjects, Religious and Moral by Phillis Wheatley, Negro Servant to Mr. John Wheatley, of Boston, in New England (published 1 September 1773) is a collection of 39 poems written by Phillis Wheatley, the first professional African-American woman poet in America and the first African-American woman whose writings were published.

== Significance ==
Phillis Wheatley broke barriers as the first American black woman poet to be published, opening the door for future black authors. James Weldon Johnson, author, politician, diplomat and one of the first African-American professors at New York University, wrote of Wheatley that "she is not a great American poet—and in her day there were no great American poets—but she is an important American poet. Her importance, if for no other reason, rests on the fact that, save one, she is the first in order of time of all the women poets of America. And she is among the first of all American poets to issue a volume."

== Publication process ==
Phillis Wheatley had gathered 28 poems and ran advertisements searching for subscribers in Boston newspapers in February 1772 with the aid of her mistress, Mrs. Wheatley. She was unable to find a publisher in the American colonies, as it was common among the white educated colonial elite in America to perceive a racial superiority of whites over blacks. This belief was also held among prominent Enlightenment thinkers, among them David Hume who wrote that "I am apt to suspect the Negroes, and in general all the other species of men (for there are four or five different kinds) to be naturally inferior to the whites" and Immanuel Kant who believed that "[t]he Negroes of Africa have by nature no feeling that rises above the trifling." Black Africans were thought unable to reason and therefore only fit for manual labor, and could not produce literature or poetry as they required higher cognitive ability. They looked to London for a publisher more favorable towards poetry authored by an African slave. Wheatley sent her poem On the Rev. Mr. George Whitefield, which had previously brought her national attention, to Selina Hastings, Countess of Huntingdon, a Calvinist evangelist, who had been a member of Whitefield's parish. She directed Wheatley to a Bostonian bookseller, Archibald Bell, London's foremost bookseller and printer. Bell replied that since Phillis was a slave, he would need proof that she had written the poems herself. It therefore became necessary for Phillis, her master, John Wheatley, as well as many respectable members of Boston to explain how a slave had come to read and write poetry, and to convince readers that the work was truly Wheatley's own.

=== Boston Tea Party ===
Poems on Various Subjects was printed in September 1773, shortly after Parliament passed the Tea Act. The copies were placed on board the Dartmouth, which was one of the ships targeted by the Boston Tea Party. Wheatley's books were spared, as the protesters specifically only seized the tea from the cargo. The Boston Tea Party Museum currently displays a copy of the book in its exhibit.

== Preface ==
In what became standard practice for black authors writing in the 18th and early 19th centuries (including Olaudah Equiano and Venture Smith), Wheatley included in her book an apologetic and deferential preface, explaining how the poems "were written originally for the Amusement of the Author, as they were the products of her leisure Moments", her humble upbringings, and asks that "the Critic will not severely censure their Defects; and we presume they have too much Merit to be cast aside with Contempt, as worthless and trifling Effusions".

=== Letter to the publisher ===
Included in editions of Poems on Various Subjects is a letter from John Wheatley to Archibald Bell, explaining how Phillis Wheatley was brought from Africa to America at the age of eight as a slave, that she had no prior knowledge of the English language and what she did know, she did not learn from formal education, but from the Wheatley family. The letter also stated that Phillis had begun to learn to Latin and was making "some progress in it".

== Attestations ==
On 8 October 1772, Phillis Wheatley, then about 18 years of age, was interviewed by 18 gentlemen identified publicly "as the most respectable characters in Boston". Among them were John Hancock, who served as president of the Second Continental Congress and was the first and third governor of the Commonwealth of Massachusetts, and would be remembered for his large and stylish signature on the United States Declaration of Independence, the Governor of Massachusetts Thomas Hutchinson, the Lieutenant Governor of Massachusetts Andrew Oliver and the Reverend Samuel Mather, son of Cotton Mather and grandson of Increase Mather. The men signed an attestation clause verifying that they believed Wheatley had written the poems herself, as claimed by her owner, John Wheatley. This clause was addressed To the Publick in Wheatley's Poems on Various Subjects, Religious and Moral.

"AS it has been repeatedly suggested to the Publisher, by Persons, who have seen the Manuscript, that Numbers would be ready to suspect they were not really the Writings of PHILLIS, he has procured the following Attestation, from the most respectable Characters in Boston, that none might have the least Ground for disputing their Original.

WE whose Names are under-written, do assure the World, that the POEMS specified in the following Page,* were (as we verily believe) written by Phillis, a young Negro Girl, who was but a few Years since, brought an uncultivated Barbarian from Africa, and has ever since been, and now is, under the Disadvantage of serving as a Slave in a Family in this Town. She has been examined by some of the best Judges, and is thought qualified to write them

His Excellency THOMAS HUTCHINSON, Governor
The Hon. ANDREW OLIVER, Lieutenant-Governor
The Hon. Thomas Hubbard
The Hon. John Erving
The Hon. James Pitts
The Hon. Harrison Gray
The Hon. James Bowdoin
John Hancock, Esq
Joseph Green, Esq
Richard Carey, Esq
The Rev. Charles Chauncey, D. D.
The Rev. Mather Byles, D. D.
The Rev. Ed. Pemberton, D. D.
The Rev. Andrew Elliot, D. D.
The Rev. Samuel Cooper, D. D.
The Rev. Mr. Samuel Mather
The Rev. Mr. John Moorhead
Mr. John Wheatley, her Master

N. B. The original Attestation, signed by the above Gentlemen, may be seen by applying to Archibald Bell, Bookseller, No. 8, Aldgate-Street."

The phrase "She has been examined by some of the best Judges" is confusing, as there is no record of any sort of public examination of Wheatley. Henry Louis Gates suggested that Wheatley appears to have "passed [her inquiry] with flying colors". In fact this was likely intended as a generic statement to readers outside of Boston meaning simply that Wheatley's abilities were widely known in the city.

== Content ==
Phillis Wheatley was an avid student of the Bible and especially admired the works of Alexander Pope (1688–1744), the British neoclassical writer. Through Pope's translation of Homer, she also developed a taste for Greek mythology, all which have an enormous influence on her work, with much of her poetry dealing with important figures of her day.

=== Poems ===
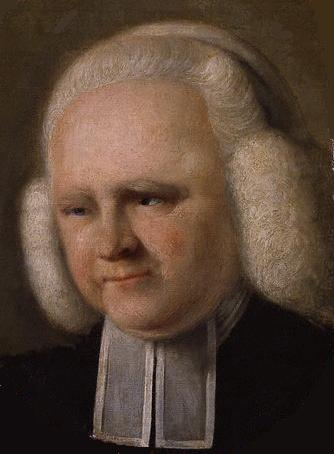
Reverend George Whitefield Church of England preacher, evangelist, founder of Methodism and subject of a eulogistic poem by Wheatley from which she gained her first fame as a poet.

- "To Maecenas"
- "On Virtue"
- "To the University of Cambridge, in New England"
- "To the King's Most Excellent Majesty"
- "On being brought from Africa"
- "On the Rev. Dr. Sewell"
- "On the Rev. Mr. George Whitefield"
- "On the Death of a young Lady of five Years of Age"
- "On the Death of a young Gentleman"
- "To a Lady on the Death of her Husband"
- "Goliath of Gath"
- "Thoughts on the Works of Providence"
- "To a Lady on the Death of three Relations"
- "To a Clergyman on the Death of his Lady"
- "An Hymn to the Morning"
- "An Hymn to the Evening"
- "On Isaiah lxiii. 1–8"
- "On Recollection"
- "On Imagination"
- "A Funeral Poem on the Death of an Infant aged twelve Months"
- "To Captain H. D. of the 65th Regiment"
- "To the Right Hon. William, Earl of Dartmouth"
- "Ode to Neptune"
- "To a Lady on her coming to North America with her Son, for the Recovery of her Health"
- "To a Lady on her remarkable Preservation in a Hurricane in North Carolina"
- "To a Lady and her Children on the Death of the Lady's Brother and Sister, and a Child of the Name of Avis, aged one Year"
- "On the Death of Dr. Samuel Marshall"
- "To a Gentleman on his Voyage to Great-Britain, for the Recovery of his Health"
- "To the Rev. Dr. Thomas Amory on reading his Sermons on Daily Devotion, in which that Duty is recommended and assisted
- "On the Death of J. C. an Infant"
- "An Hymn to Humanity"
- "To the Hon. T. H. Esq; on the Death of his Daughter"
- "Niobe in Distress for her Children slain by Apollo, from Ovid's Metamorphoses, Book VI, and from a View of the Painting of Mr. Richard Wilson"
- "To S. M. a young African Painter, on seeing his Works"
- "To his Honour the Lieutenant-Governor, on the Death of his Lady"
- "A Farewell to America"
- "A Rebus by I. B."
- "An Answer to ditto, by Phillis Wheatley"

=== "To S. M. a young African Painter, on seeing his Works" ===
Written to Scipio Moorhead, an enslaved African American artist living in Boston, credited with engraving the frontispiece of Wheatley used in Poems on Various Subjects. The poem follows Wheatley's pattern of offering praise for individuals, in this instance seemingly as gratitude for the frontispiece.

TO show the lab'ring bosom's deep intent,
And thought in living characters to paint,
When first thy pencil did those beauties give,
And breathing figures learnt from thee to live,
How did those prospects give my soul delight,
A new creation rushing on my sight?
Still, wond'rous youth! each noble path pursue,
On deathless glories fix thine ardent view:
Still may the painter's and the poet's fire
To aid thy pencil, and thy verse conspire!
And may the charms of each seraphic theme
Conduct thy footsteps to immortal fame!
High to the blissful wonders of the skies
Elate thy soul, and raise thy wishful eyes.
Thrice happy, when exalted to survey
That splendid city, crown'd with endless day,
Whose twice six gates on radiant hinges ring:
Celestial Salem blooms in endless spring.

Calm and serene thy moments glide along,
And may the muse inspire each future song!
Still, with the sweets of contemplation bless’d,
May peace with balmy wings your soul invest!
But when these shades of time are chas’d away,
And darkness ends in everlasting day,
On what seraphic pinions shall we move,
And view the landscapes in the realms above?
There shall thy tongue in heav’nly murmurs flow,
And there my muse with heav’nly transport glow:
No more to tell of Damon’s tender sighs,
Or rising radiance of Aurora’s eyes,
For nobler themes demand a nobler strain,
And purer language on th’ ethereal plain.
Cease, gentle muse! the solemn gloom of night
Now seals the fair creation from my sight.

=== "On the Death of the Rev. Mr. George Whitefield" ===
This work brought about Wheatley's initial fame. Published in Boston, Philadelphia and New Haven, it is an elegiac poem written in heroic couplets, in honor of Reverend Whitefield, an influential preacher in New England and the founder of Methodism.

Hail, happy saint, on thine immortal throne,
Possest of glory, life, and bliss unknown;
We hear no more the music of thy tongue,
Thy wonted auditories cease to throng.
Thy sermons in unequall'd accents flow'd,
And ev'ry bosom with devotion glow'd;
Thou didst in strains of eloquence refin'd
Inflame the heart, and captivate the mind.
Unhappy we the setting sun deplore,
So glorious once, but ah! it shines no more.

Behold the prophet in his tow'ring flight!
He leaves the earth for heav'n's unmeasur'd height,
And worlds unknown receive him from our sight.
There Whitefield wings with rapid course his way,
And sails to Zion through vast seas of day.
Thy pray'rs, great saint, and thine incessant cries
Have pierc'd the bosom of thy native skies.
Thou moon hast seen, and all the stars of light,
How he has wrestled with his God by night.
He pray'd that grace in ev'ry heart might dwell,
He long'd to see America excell;
He charg'd its youth that ev'ry grace divine
Should with full lustre in their conduct shine;
That Saviour, which his soul did first receive,
The greatest gift that ev'n a God can give,
He freely offer'd to the num'rous throng,
That on his lips with list'ning pleasure hung.

"Take him, ye wretched, for your only good,
"Take him ye starving sinners, for your food;
"Ye thirsty, come to this life-giving stream,
"Ye preachers, take him for your joyful theme;
"Take him my dear Americans, he said,
"Be your complaints on his kind bosom laid:
"Take him, ye Africans, he longs for you,
"Impartial Saviour is his title due:
"Wash'd in the fountain of redeeming blood,
"You shall be sons, and kings, and priests to God."

Great Countess, we Americans revere
Thy name, and mingle in thy grief sincere;
New England deeply feels, the Orphans mourn,
Their more than father will no more return.

But, though arrested by the hand of death,
Whitefield no more exerts his lab'ring breath,
Yet let us view him in th' eternal skies,
Let ev'ry heart to this bright vision rise;
While the tomb safe retains its sacred trust,
Till life divine re-animates his dust.

=== "On Virtue" ===
Following the style of Alexander Pope, Wheatley invokes Virtue to aid her on her journey through life, and her strife for a higher appellation.

O Thou bright jewel in my aim I strive
To comprehend thee. Thine own words declare
Wisdom is higher than a fool can reach.
I cease to wonder, and no more attempt
Thine height t' explore, or fathom thy profound.
But, O my soul, sink not into despair,
Virtue is near thee, and with gentle hand
Would now embrace thee, hovers o'er thine head.
Fain would the heav'n-born soul with her converse,
Then seek, then court her for her promis'd bliss.

Auspicious queen, thine heav'nly pinions spread,
And lead celestial Chastity along;
Lo! now her sacred retinue descends,
Array'd in glory from the orbs above.
Attend me, Virtue, thro' my youthful years!
O leave me not to the false joys of time!
But guide my steps to endless life and bliss.
Greatness, or Goodness, say what I shall call thee,
To give me an higher appellation still,
Teach me a better strain, a nobler lay,
O thou, enthron'd with Cherubs in the realms of day.

=== "To the King's Most Excellent Majesty" ===
Written in honor of King George III, this was a poem of praise for a notable person of the day, as were the subjects of many of Wheatley's poems. Here she praises him on behalf of the American colonies for his repeal of the Stamp Act.

YOUR subjects hope, dread Sire –
The crown upon your brows may flourish long,
And that your arm may in your God be strong!
O may your sceptre num'rous nations sway,
And all with love and readiness obey!

But how shall we the British king reward!
Rule thou in peace, our father, and our lord!
Midst the remembrance of thy favours past,
The meanest peasants most admire the last *
May George, beloved by all the nations round,
Live with heav'ns choicest constant blessings crown'd!
Great God, direct, and guard him from on high,
And from his head let ev'ry evil fly!
And may each clime with equal gladness see
A monarch's smile can set his subjects free!

== Reception ==
Wheatley was the first African-American to publish a book, man or woman, and the first to achieve an international reputation when she travelled to London to publish Poems on Various Subjects in 1773. She was noticed by Benjamin Franklin, Brook Watson the Lord Mayor of London, who gave her a copy of Paradise Lost by John Milton, and she was also scheduled to recite a poem for King George III, but Wheatley was unable to attend as she was forced to return to Boston a month before Poems on Various Subjects was to be published, due to a fatal illness of her mistress, Susana Wheatley.

Wheatley was unable to publish any additional poetry. Between 30 October and 18 December 1779, she ran six advertisements soliciting subscribers for "300 pages in Octavo", a volume "Dedicated to the Right Hon. Benjamin Franklin, Esq.: One of the Ambassadors of the United States at the Court of France". As with Poems on Various Subjects, however, the American populace would not support one of its most noted poets. An estimated total of 145 of Wheatley's poems have been lost.

== Criticism ==
=== Contemporary criticism ===
Thomas Jefferson panned Wheatley's ability in his Notes on the State of Virginia, writing that "[r]eligion, indeed, has produced a Phillis Wheatley; but it could not produce a poet. The compositions published under her name are below the dignity of criticism." However, Wheatley received praise from such notables as Benjamin Franklin and Voltaire, who wrote that Wheatley produced "de très-bons vers anglais" (very good English verse). George Washington responded to a poem Wheatley had composed for him, writing that "however undeserving I may be of such encomium and panegyrick, the style and manner exhibit a striking proof of your great poetical Talents."

=== Modern-day criticism ===
20th-century poetry critic James Johnson notes that, while Wheatley was not a "great" American poet, she was no doubt an "important one". In addition, Johnson notes that her poetry was simply the poetry of the time, that is, the 18th century, and that she was very much influenced by Alexander Pope. Johnson concludes by stating that "her work must not be judged by the work and standards of a later day, but by the work and standards of her own day and her own contemporaries. By this method of criticism she stands out as one of the important characters in the making of American literature, without any allowances for her sex or her antecedents".

It is also argued that Wheatley's position as a slave did not afford her the freedom to truly speak her mind in her poetry. Scholars have recently uncovered poems, letters and facts about Wheatley and her association with 18th-century black abolitionists, and "charted her notable use of classicism and have explicated the sociological intent of her biblical allusions. All this research and interpretation has proven Wheatley's disdain for the institution of slavery and her use of art to undermine its practice".

=== "On Being Brought from Africa to America" ===
In addition to Wheatley's poem "To His Excellency General Washington", "On Being Brought from Africa to America" is among her most often anthologized works. This poem can be said to be among the most controversial poems in African-American literature, as it overlooks the brutality of the slave trade, the horrors of the middle passage and the oppressive life of slavery.

'Twas mercy brought me from my Pagan land,
Taught my benighted soul to understand
That there's a God, that there's a Saviour too:
Once I redemption neither sought nor knew.
Some view our sable race with scornful eye,
"Their colour is a diabolic die."
Remember, Christians, Negros, black as Cain,
May be refin'd, and join th' angelic train.

== Published editions ==
- — (1773). Poems on various subjects, religious and moral. London: Archibald Bell. Available online from Internet Archive and Project Gutenberg. Audio recording read by Elizabeth Klett available from LibriVox.
- — (1801). "Poems on various subjects, religious and moral". In Lavallée, Joseph (ed.). The Negro equalled by few Europeans. Vol. 2. Philadelphia, PA: William W. Woodward. p. 167ff.
- — (1834). Memoir and poems of Phillis Wheatley, a native African and a slave. Boston: George W. Light.
- — (1838). Memoir and poems of Phillis Wheatley, a native African and a slave (3rd ed.). Isaac Knapp. OCLC 191229727.
- — (1887). Poems on various subjects, religious and moral. W. H. Lawrence.
- — (1909). The poems of Phillis Wheatley. R. R. and C.C. Wright.
- — (1966). Mason, Julian Dewey (ed.). The poems of Phillis Wheatley. Chapel Hill: University of North Carolina Press. ISBN 0-8078-1835-6. https://archive.org/details/poems00whea
- — (1969). Heartman, Charles F. (ed.). Memoir and poems of Phillis Wheatley, a native African and a slave. Miami, Florida: Mnemosyne. OCLC 639739142. Facsimile reprint of 1838
- — (1989). Mason, Julian Dewey (ed.). The poems of Phillis Wheatley (Revised and enlarged ed.). Chapel Hill: University of North Carolina Press. ISBN 0-8078-1835-6. (Additional copy available)
- — (1995). Poems of Phillis Wheatley, a native African and a slave. Applewood Books. ISBN 978-1-55709-233-5. A revised edition of the 1969 edition
- — (1988). Shields, John C. (ed.). The collected works of Phillis Wheatley. Schomberg library of nineteenth century black women writers. Oxford University Press. ISBN 978-0-19-506085-0. Borrow from Internet Archive
- — (2012). The poems of Phillis Wheatley: With letters and a memoir. Mineola, NY: Dover. ISBN 978-0-486-11529-0. Apparently a republication of the 1838 edition.

== See also ==
- Slave narrative
- African-American literature
- Jupiter Hammon
- Portrait of Phillis Wheatley
