= Phillis Wheatley Elementary School, New Orleans =

Phillis Wheatley Elementary School
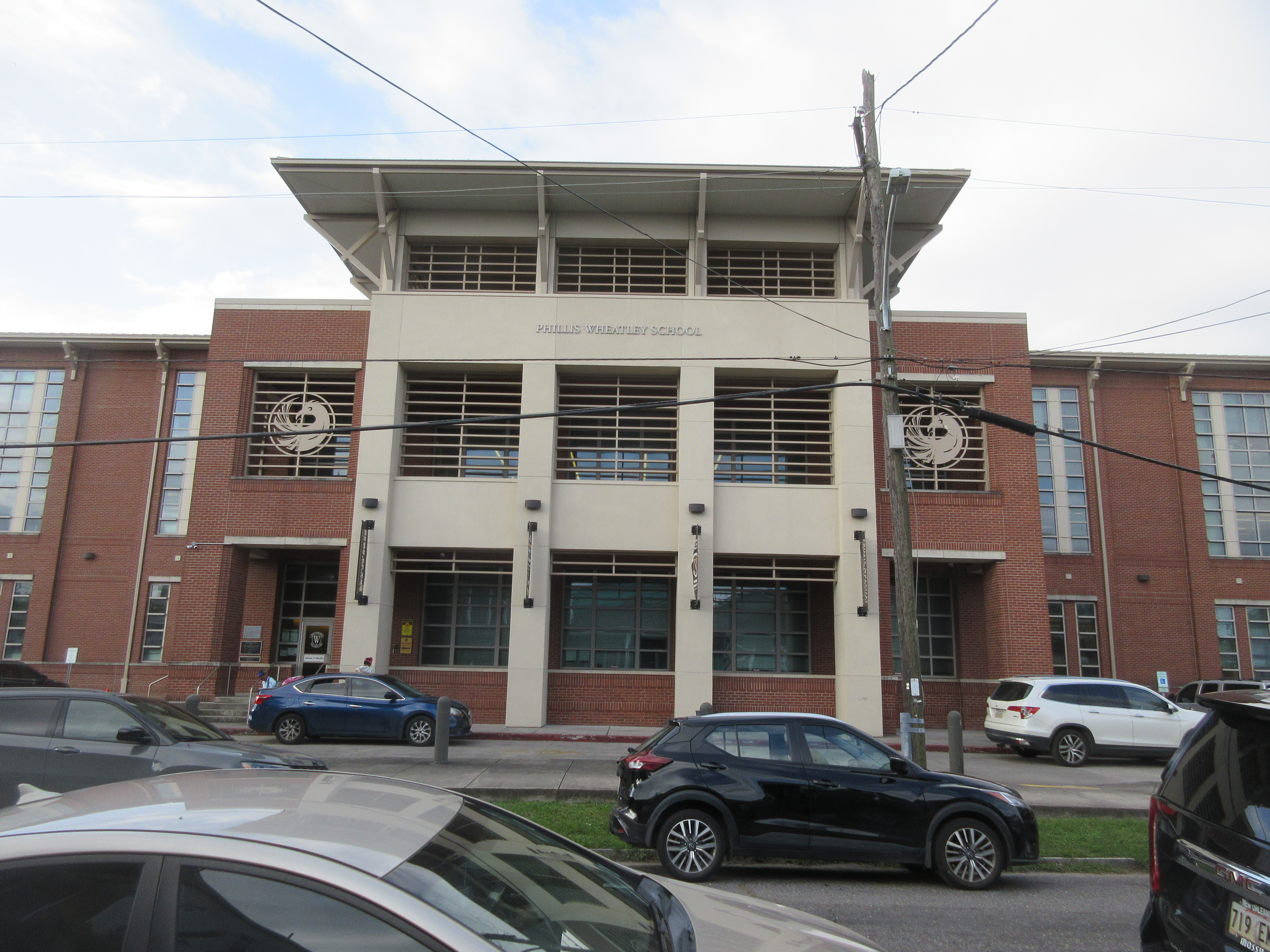
- The new building, 2025

Location
- 29.969119°N 90.0782755°W

Information
- Founded: 1954
- Last updated: 29 December 2017

Phillis Wheatley Elementary School is a school in New Orleans. The original school building was designed by the architect Charles Colbert in 1954 as a segregated school for African-American students. The cantilevered steel truss structure allowed for a covered play space underneath. The primary school building did not flood after Hurricane Katrina, but it remained closed. On June 17, 2011, the school was demolished, despite an 11th hour protest to save the building. In 2014, a newly constructed three-story campus opened to students.

== General information ==
=== Location ===
The school is located at 2300 Dumaine Street in New Orleans' Tremé neighborhood, one of the nation's oldest black neighborhoods. In keeping with the historical significance of the surrounding area, the school was named after Phillis Wheatley, the first black, female, slave poet in the United States.

=== Design of original structure ===
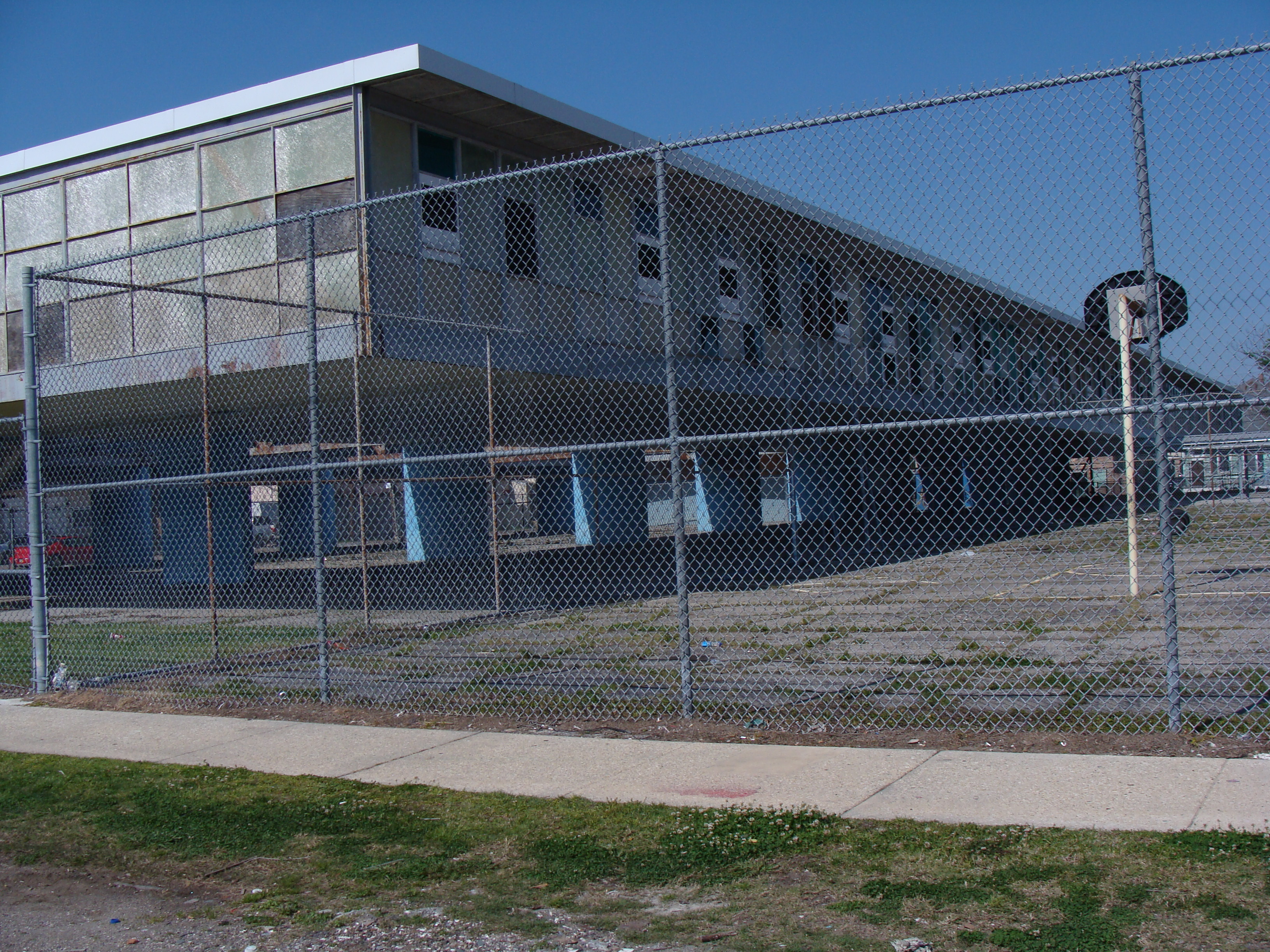
The old building prior to demolition, 2008

Architect Charles Colbert was assigned the task of designing a school that could accommodate 800 students but would occupy a two-acre campus, just one-sixth of the land area recommended for a student body that size. The resulting structure is considered his most important work and one of the best examples of Modern Architecture in New Orleans.

Colbert's design incorporated glass windows instead of exterior walls and elevated classrooms, which spared the building from being flooded during Hurricane Katrina. The open space below the classrooms also provided a covered play area for students. However, some teachers criticized the design, claiming that the large windows allowed pupils to pay more attention to events outside than at the front of the classroom. Teachers also faulted the large windows for causing glare on the blackboards.

Updated fire codes also prohibited upper floor classrooms from being used by younger students, requiring the installation of portable buildings on the school grounds for kindergarten and first-grade classes.

=== Honors ===
The building received a national school design award in 1954 and was profiled in a three-page article in the July 1956 issue of Architectural Forum. The U.S. State Department displayed a model of the school in Berlin and Moscow to showcase American achievement in modern architecture.

The World Monuments Fund cites the structure as "a valuable example of regional modernism." The Fund placed the building on its World Monument Watch list in 2009, along with the ruins at Machu Picchu and Antoni Gaudi's Sagrada Familia church in Barcelona.
