= Jane Turell =

American poet

Jane Colman Turell (1708–1735) was an 18th-century American colonial poet.

== Biography ==
A gifted young scholar, her father provided an unusually good education for a young woman of this period. She was the first of a number of prolific women poets whose works were published in the colonies. Born in Boston, she was the only daughter of Dr. Benjamin Colman, a clergyman and writer. Encouraged by her father to follow literary pursuits, she started writing poetry at the age of 11. At the age of 19, she married Rev. Ebenezer Turell of Medford, Massachusetts. A writer of "classic" poetry focused primarily on religion and family life, she modeled her life and writings after Elizabeth Singer Rowe. Turrell's contemporaries were Francis Knapp, Benjamin Colman, Roger Wolcott, Mather Byles, and Rev. John Adams.

Turell died at the age of 27. She wrote about her experience with childbirth, which included stillbirth, early death of her infants, and painful occurrences. Her letters, diary extracts, short religious essays and pious verse were collected in a pamphlet and published by her husband immediately after her death in 1735, as Reliquiate Turellae et Lachrymae Paternal, and reprinted in 1741 as Memoirs of the Life and Death of the Pious and Ingenious Mrs. Jane Turell.
