= Portrait of Phillis Wheatley =

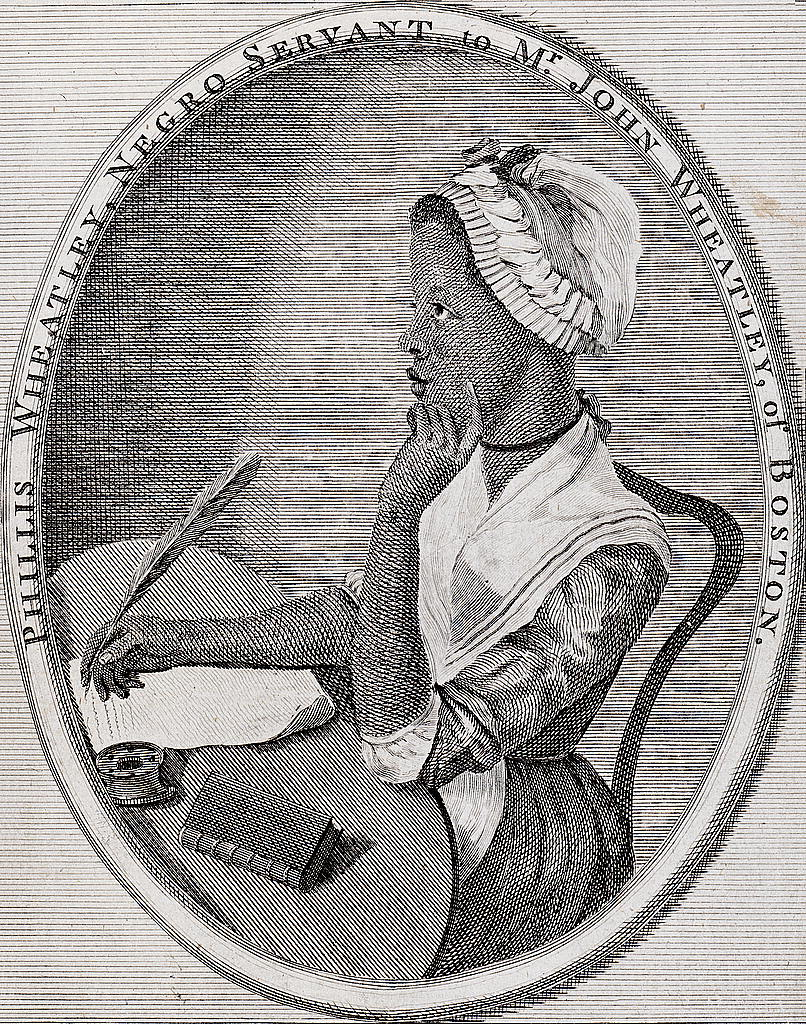
- Artist: Scipio Moorhead?
- Year: 1773

Portrait of Phillis Wheatley is a lost painting used as the frontispiece for poet Phillis Wheatley's poetry collection Poems on Various Subjects, Religious and Moral, first published in 1773. Wheatley was the United States' first professional African American woman poet and the first African-American woman whose writings were published. She is also the third woman in the United States, regardless of ethnicity, to have her written work published. Copies of the engraving reside in the National Portrait Gallery at the Smithsonian Institution, the Library of Congress, the Beinecke Rare Book & Manuscript Library of the Yale University Library, and the Metropolitan Museum of Art.

== Description ==
The painting depicts a young African American woman, Phillis Wheatley, sitting at a desk. She has a thoughtful look on her face, with her left hand poised against her chin, as if thinking about what she will write next with the quill in right hand. Her right hand sits atop a piece of paper. On the desk is also ink and a small book. She wears a bonnet and an apron over her dress.

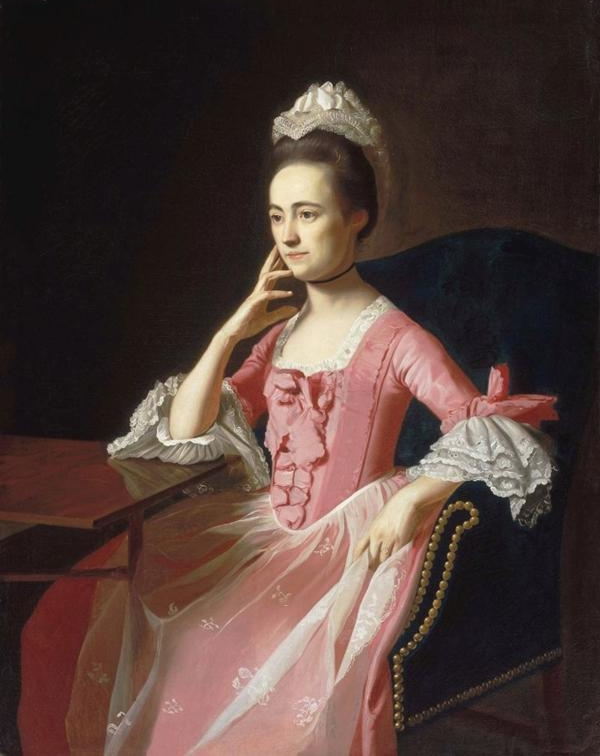
Portrait of Dorothy Quincy, wife of John Hancock, by John Singleton Copley

The pose which Wheatley makes as she hovers her pen over the paper is reminiscent of the works of John Singleton Copley, who was commissioned to make portraits for many famous Bostonians of the time, and whose works were widely exhibited and shown throughout the city. However, Copley never portrayed a woman in the act of writing. In fact, this portrait appears to be the first portrayal of a woman writing in American history.

== History ==
Phillis Wheatley failed to have her book published in the United States; therefore, she had her book published in London. To verify that she was indeed African American, the publisher asked that she provide a portrait for the work, which was engraved for the frontispiece. Another, poorer quality, engraving was made for a Boston area almanac in 1781, possibly based on the frontispiece. The fate of the original is unknown, and it is reported that in later years, Wheatley's mistress possessed only the engraving, which was "said to have been a striking representation of the original."

It is believed by some modern scholars that Wheatley commissioned the African American artist Scipio Moorhead to create the portrait. She knew of Moorhead because he was the slave of Reverend John Moorhead in Boston, where she used to live, and wrote a poem in honor of him and his work. Additionally, the painting's unusual depiction of a black woman writing has no parallel among the white artists contemporary to the period. However, despite the fact that 19th-century abolitionists were interested in Wheatley and gathered information and anecdotes about her and other Boston area slaves, there are no sources from the 18th or 19th century that attest to the identity of the artist.
