= Phyllis Wheatley YWCA (Washington, D.C) =

- U.S. National Register of Historic Places
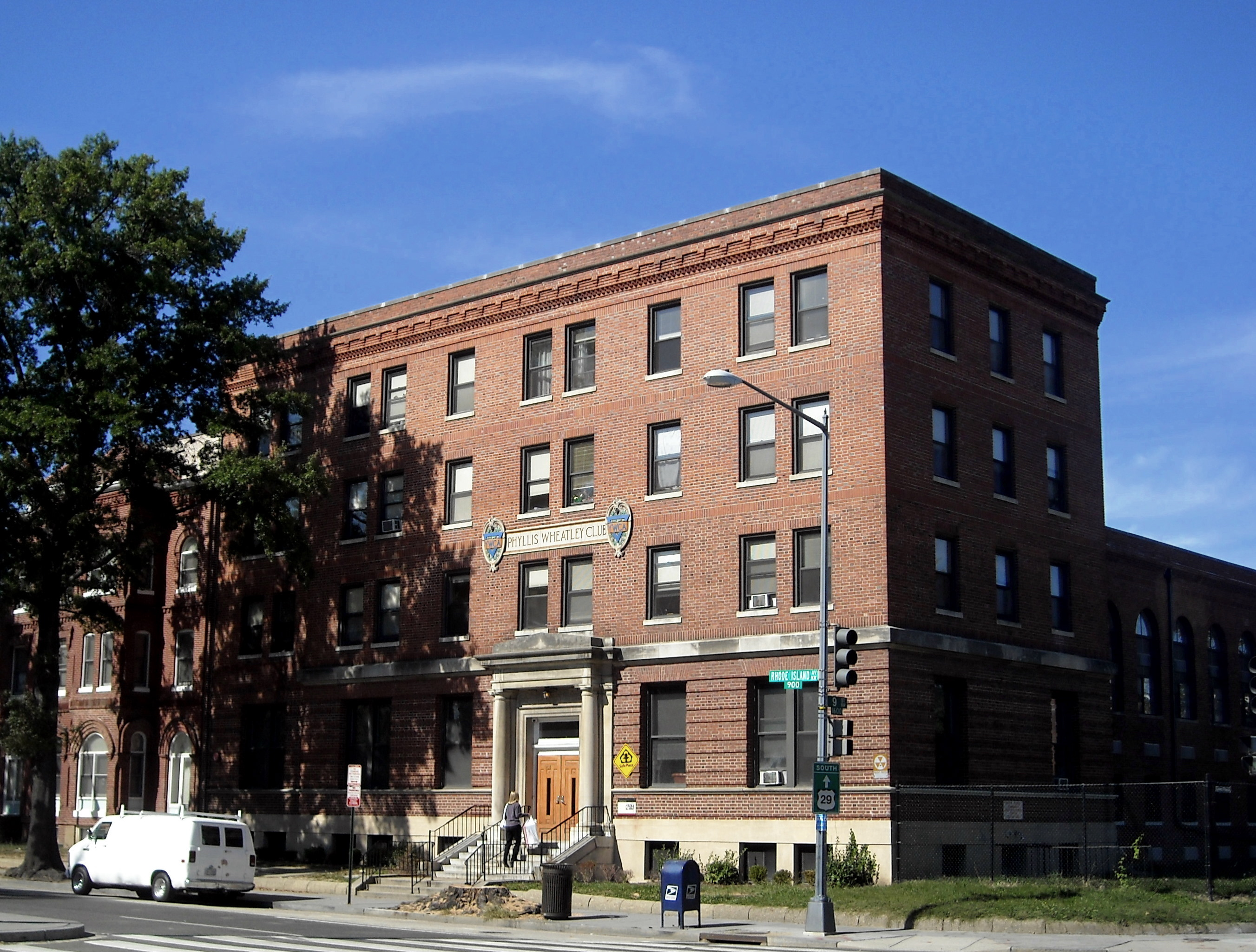
- Phyllis Wheatley YWCA in 2008

- Location within Washington, D.C.
- Location: 901 Rhode Island Ave. NW, Washington, District of Columbia
- Coordinates: 38°54′42″N 77°1′28″W
- Area: 4 acres (1.6 ha)
- Built: 1920
- Architect: Shroeder & Parish
- Architectural style: Colonial Revival
- NRHP reference No.: 83003532
- Added to NRHP: October 6, 1983

The Phyllis Wheatley YWCA is a Young Women's Christian Association building in Washington, D.C., that was designed by architects Shroeder & Parish and was built in 1920. It was listed on the National Register of Historic Places in 1983.

It is named for Phillis Wheatley (1753–1784), who was likely the first black woman professional poet and writer in the United States.

According to its National Register nomination, "The "Y" building is typical of the Colonial Revival institutional architecture so prevalent in the District and the United States during the 1920s and 1930s." It is four stories tall over a raised basement, and is built of red brick with a corbeled brick cornice.
