= Phillis Wheatley =

American writer (c. 1753–1784)

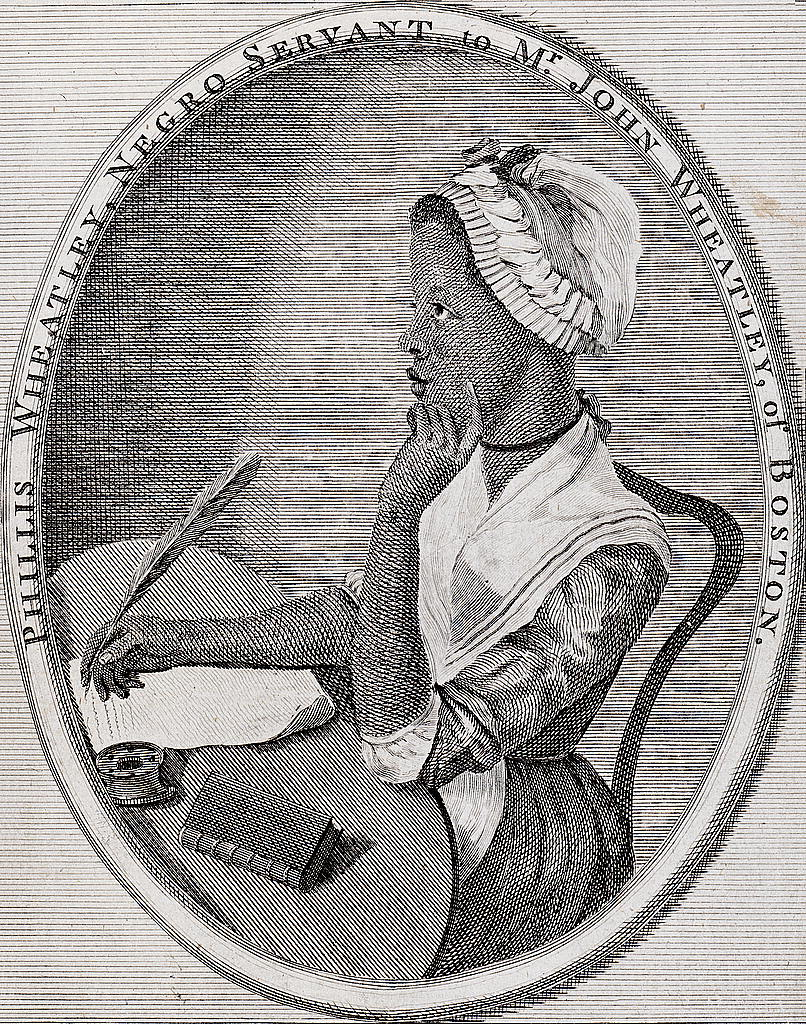
- Portrait of Phillis Wheatley, attributed by some scholars to Scipio Moorhead
- Born: c. 1753; West Africa
- Died: December 5, 1784 (aged 31); Boston, Massachusetts
- Occupation: Poet
- Spouse: John Peters
- Children: Uncertain. Up to three with none surviving past early childhood.
- Writing career
- Language: English
- Period: American Revolution
- Notable work: Poems on Various Subjects, Religious and Moral (1773)

Phillis Wheatley Peters, also spelled Phyllis and Wheatly (c. 1753 – December 5, 1784), was an American writer who is considered the first African-American author of a published book of poetry. Born in West Africa, she was sold into slavery at the age of seven or eight and transported to North America, where she was bought by the Wheatley family of Boston. After she learned to read and write, they encouraged her poetry when they saw her talent.

On a 1773 trip to London with the Wheatleys' son, seeking publication of her work, Wheatley met prominent people who became her patrons. The publication in London of her Poems on Various Subjects, Religious and Moral on September 1, 1773, brought her fame both in England and the American colonies. Prominent figures, such as George Washington, praised her work. A few years later, African-American poet Jupiter Hammon praised her work in a poem of his own.

Wheatley was emancipated by the Wheatleys shortly after the publication of her book of poems. The Wheatleys died soon thereafter, and Phillis Wheatley married John Peters, a poor grocer. They lost three children, who all died young. Wheatley-Peters died in poverty and obscurity at the age of 31.

== Early life ==
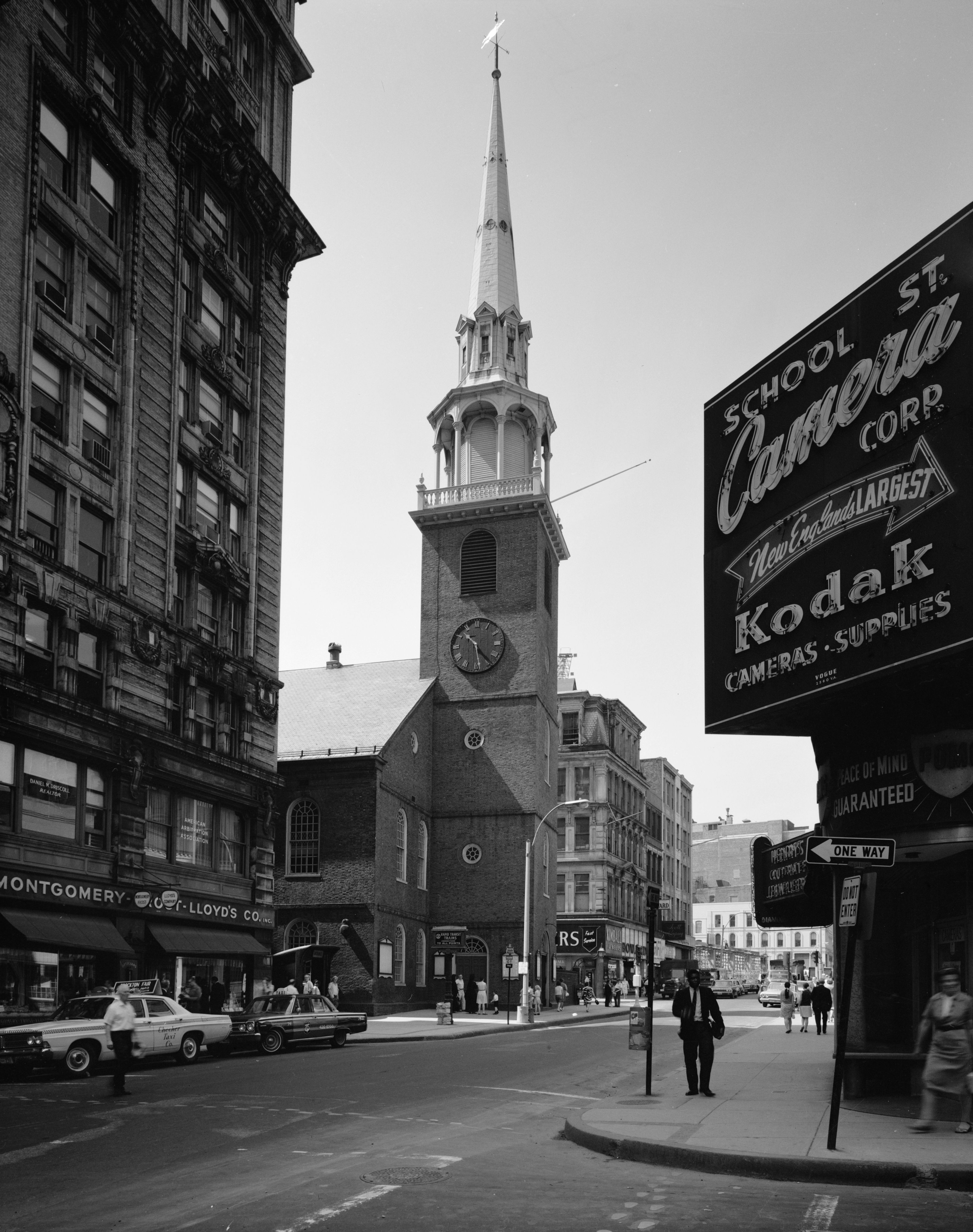
Phillis Wheatley's church, Old South Meeting House

Although the date and place of her birth are not documented, scholars believe that Wheatley was born in 1753 in West Africa, most likely in present-day Gambia or Senegal. She was sold by a local chief to a visiting trader, who took her to Boston in the Province of Massachusetts Bay, on July 11, 1761, on the slave ship Phillis. The vessel was owned by Timothy Fitch and captained by Peter Gwinn.

On arrival in Boston, Wheatley was bought by the wealthy Boston merchant and tailor John Wheatley as a slave for his wife Susanna. The Wheatleys named her Phillis, after the ship that had transported her to North America. She was given their last name of Wheatley, as was a common custom if any surname was used for enslaved people.

The Wheatleys' 18-year-old daughter, Mary, was Phillis's first tutor in reading and writing. Their son, Nathaniel, also tutored her. John Wheatley was known as a progressive throughout New England; his family afforded Phillis an unprecedented education for an enslaved person, and one unusual for a woman of any race at the time. By the age of 12, Phillis was reading Greek and Latin classics in their original languages, as well as difficult passages from the Bible. At the age of 14, she wrote her first poem, "To the University of Cambridge [Harvard], in New England".

Recognizing her literary ability, the Wheatley family supported Phillis's education and left household labor to their other domestic enslaved workers. The Wheatleys often exhibited Phillis's abilities to friends and family. Strongly influenced by her readings of the works of Alexander Pope, John Milton, Homer, Horace and Virgil, Phillis began to write poetry.

== Later life ==
In 1773, at the age of 20, Phillis accompanied Nathaniel Wheatley to London in part for her health (she suffered from chronic asthma), but primarily because Susanna believed Phillis would have a better chance of publishing her book of poems there than in the colonies. Phillis had an audience with Frederick Bull, who was the Lord Mayor of London, and other prominent members of British society. (An audience with King George III was arranged, but Phillis had returned to Boston before it could take place.) Selina Hastings, Countess of Huntingdon, became interested in the talented young African woman and subsidized the publication of Wheatley's volume of poems, which appeared in London in the summer of 1773. As Hastings was ill, the two never met.

After Phillis's book was published, by November 1773, the Wheatleys manumitted Phillis. Susanna Wheatley died in the spring of 1774, and John in 1778. Shortly after, Phillis met and married John Peters, an impoverished free black grocer. They lived in poor conditions and two of their babies died.

John was improvident and was imprisoned for debt in 1784. With a sickly infant son to provide for, Phillis became a scullery maid at a boarding house, doing work she had never done before; she developed pneumonia and died on December 5, 1784, at the age of 31, after giving birth to a daughter, who died the same day as her.

=== Other writings ===
Wheatley wrote a letter to Reverend Samson Occom, commending him on his ideas and beliefs stating that enslaved people should be given their natural-born rights in America. Wheatley also exchanged letters with the British philanthropist John Thornton, who discussed Wheatley and her poetry in correspondence with John Newton. Through her letter writing, Wheatley was able to express her thoughts, comments and concerns to others.

In 1775, she sent a copy of a poem entitled "To His Excellency, George Washington" to the then-military general. The following year, Washington invited Wheatley to visit him at his military headquarters in Cambridge, Massachusetts. Thomas Paine republished the poem in The Pennsylvania Gazette in April 1776.

In 1779, Wheatley issued a proposal for a second volume of poems but was unable to publish it because she had lost her patrons after her emancipation; publication of books was often based on gaining subscriptions for guaranteed sales beforehand. The American Revolutionary War (1775–1783) was also a factor. However, some of her poems that were to be included in the second volume were later published in pamphlets and newspapers.

== Poetry ==
External videos
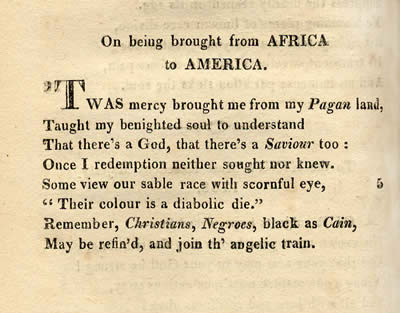
- "On Being Brought from Africa To America by Phillis Wheatley; Narrated by Teyuna T Darris", 0:47, July 8, 2015, GoodPoetry.org.

In 1768, Wheatley wrote "To the King's Most Excellent Majesty", in which she praised King George III for repealing the Stamp Act. But while discussing the idea of freedom, Wheatley was able subtly to raise the idea of freedom for enslaved subjects of the king as well:

May George, beloved by all the nations round,
Live with heav’ns choicest constant blessings crown'd!
Great God, direct, and guard him from on high,
And from his head let ev’ry evil fly!
And may each clime with equal gladness see
A monarch's smile can set his subjects free!

As the American Revolution gained strength, Wheatley's writing turned to themes that expressed ideas of the rebellious colonists.

In 1770, she wrote a poetic tribute to the evangelist George Whitefield. Her poetry expressed Christian themes, and many poems were dedicated to famous figures. Over one-third consist of elegies, the remainder being on religious, classical and abstract themes. She seldom referred to her own life in her poems. One example of a poem on slavery is "On being brought from Africa to America":

Twas mercy brought me from my Pagan land,
Taught my benighted soul to understand
That there's a God, that there's a Saviour too:
Once I redemption neither sought nor knew.
Some view our sable race with scornful eye,
"Their colour is a diabolic dye."
Remember, Christians, Negroes, black as Cain,
May be refin'd, and join th' angelic train.

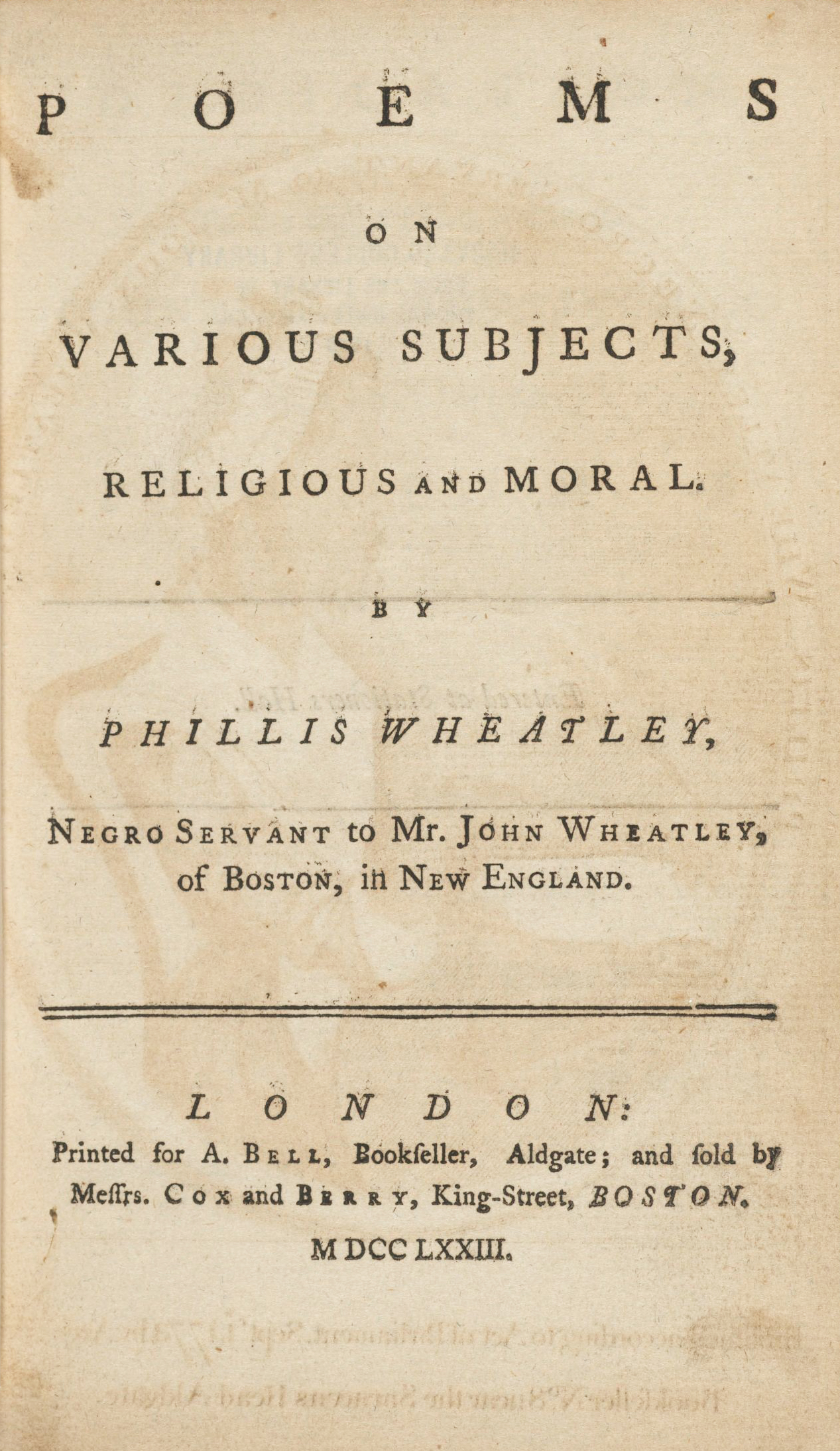
Poems on Various Subjects, Religious and Moral, 1773

Many colonists found it difficult to believe that an African slave was writing "excellent" poetry. Wheatley had to defend her authorship of her poetry in court in 1772. She was examined by a group of Boston luminaries, including John Erving, Reverend Charles Chauncey, John Hancock, Thomas Hutchinson, the governor of Massachusetts, and his lieutenant governor Andrew Oliver. They concluded she had written the poems ascribed to her and signed an attestation, which was included in the preface of her book of collected works: Poems on Various Subjects, Religious and Moral, published in London in 1773. Publishers in Boston had declined to publish it, but her work was of great interest to influential people in London.

There, Selina, Countess of Huntingdon and the Earl of Dartmouth acted as patrons to help Wheatley gain publication. Her poetry received comment in The London Magazine in 1773, which published her poem "Hymn to the Morning" as a specimen of her work, writing: "[t]hese poems display no astonishing power of genius; but when we consider them as the productions of a young untutored African, who wrote them after six months casual study of the English language and of writing, we cannot suppress our admiration of talents so vigorous and lively." Poems on Various Subjects, Religious and Moral was printed in 11 editions until 1816.

In 1778, the African-American poet Jupiter Hammon wrote an ode to Wheatley ("An Address to Miss Phillis Wheatley"). His master Lloyd had temporarily moved with his slaves to Hartford, Connecticut, during the Revolutionary War. Hammon thought that Wheatley had succumbed to what he believed were pagan influences in her writing, and so his "Address" consisted of 21 rhyming quatrains, each accompanied by a related Bible verse, that he thought would compel Wheatley to return to a Christian path in life.

In 1838, Boston-based publisher and abolitionist Isaac Knapp published a collection of Wheatley's poetry, along with that of enslaved North Carolina poet George Moses Horton, under the title Memoir and Poems of Phillis Wheatley, A Native African and a Slave. Also, Poems by a Slave. Wheatley's memoir was earlier published in 1834 by Geo W. Light but did not include poems by Horton.

Thomas Jefferson, in his book Notes on the State of Virginia, was unwilling to acknowledge the value of her work or the work of any black poet. He wrote:

Misery is often the parent of the most affecting touches in poetry. Among the blacks is misery enough, God knows, but no poetry. Love is the peculiar oestrum of the poet. Their love is ardent, but it kindles the senses only, not the imagination. Religion indeed has produced a Phyllis Whately [sic] but it could not produce a poet. The compositions published under her name are below the dignity of criticism.

== Style, structure, and influences on poetry ==
Wheatley believed that the power of poetry was immeasurable. John C. Shields, noting that her poetry did not simply reflect the literature she read but was based on her personal ideas and beliefs, writes:

Wheatley had more in mind than simple conformity. It will be shown later that her allusions to the sun god and to the goddess of the morn, always appearing as they do here in close association with her quest for poetic inspiration, are of central importance to her.

This poem is arranged into three stanzas of four lines in iambic tetrameter, followed by a concluding couplet in iambic pentameter. The rhyme scheme is ABABCC. Shields sums up her writing as being "contemplative and reflective rather than brilliant and shimmering."

She repeated three primary elements: Christianity, classicism and hierophantic solar worship. The hierophantic solar worship was part of what she brought with her from Africa; the worship of sun gods is expressed as part of her African culture, which may be why she used so many different words for the sun. For instance, she uses Aurora eight times, "Apollo seven, Phoebus twelve, and Sol twice." Shields believes that the word "light" is significant to her as it marks her African history, a past that she has left physically behind. He notes that Sun is a homonym for Son, and that Wheatley intended a double reference to Christ. Wheatley also refers to "heav'nly muse" in two of her poems: "To a Clergy Man on the Death of his Lady" and "Isaiah LXIII," signifying her idea of the Christian deity.

Classical allusions are prominent in Wheatley's poetry, which Shields argues set her work apart from that of her contemporaries: "Wheatley's use of classicism distinguishes her work as original and unique and deserves extended treatment." Particularly extended engagement with the Classics can be found in the poem "To Maecenas", where Wheatley uses references to Maecenas to depict the relationship between her and her own patrons, as well as making reference to Achilles and Patroclus, Homer and Virgil. At the same time, Wheatley indicates to the complexity of her relationship with Classical texts by pointing to the sole example of Terence as an ancestor for her works:

The happier Terence all the choir inspir'd,
His soul replenish'd, and his bosom fir'd;
But say, ye Muses, why this partial grace,
To one alone of Afric's sable race;

While some scholars have argued that Wheatley's allusions to classical material are based on the reading of other neoclassical poetry (such as the works of Alexander Pope), Emily Greenwood has demonstrated that Wheatley's work demonstrates persistent linguistic engagement with Latin texts, suggesting good familiarity with the ancient works themselves. Both Shields and Greenwood have argued that Wheatley's use of classical imagery and ideas was designed to deliver "subversive" messages to her educated, majority white audience, and argue for the freedom of Wheatley herself and other enslaved people.

== Scholarly critique ==
Black literary scholars from the 1960s to the present in critiquing Wheatley's writing have noted the absence in it of her sense of identity as a black enslaved person. A number of black literary scholars have viewed her work—and its widespread admiration—as a barrier to the development of black people during her time and as a prime example of Uncle Tom syndrome, believing that Wheatley's lack of awareness of her condition of enslavement furthers this syndrome among descendants of Africans in the Americas. However, others, more recently, have argued on her behalf. O'Neal notes that Wheatley "was a strong force among contemporary abolitionist writers, and that, through the use of Biblical imagery, she incorporated anti-slavery statements in her work within the confines of her era and her position as a slave." Chernoh Sesay, Jr. sees a trend towards a more balanced view of Wheatley, looking at her "not in twentieth century terms, but instead according to the conditions of the eighteenth century," and Henry Louis Gates has argued for her rehabilitation, asking "What would happen if we ceased to stereotype Wheatley but, instead, read her, read her with all the resourcefulness that she herself brought to her craft?".

Some scholars thought Wheatley's perspective came from her upbringing. Writing in 1974, Eleanor Smith argued that the Wheatley family took interest in her at a young age because of her timid and submissive nature. Using this to their advantage, the Wheatley family was able to mold and shape her into a person of their liking. The family separated her from other slaves in the home and she was prevented from doing anything other than very light housework. This shaping prevented Phillis from ever becoming a threat to the Wheatley family or other people from the white community. As a result, Phillis was allowed to attend white social events and this created a misconception of the relationship between black and white people for her.

The matter of Wheatley's biography, "a white woman's memoir", has been a subject of investigation. In 2020, American poet Honorée Fanonne Jeffers published her The Age of Phillis, based on the understanding that Margaretta Matilda Odell's account of Wheatley's life portrayed Wheatley inaccurately, and as a character in a sentimental novel; the poems by Jeffers attempt to fill in the gaps and recreate a more realistic portrait of Wheatley.

== Legacy and honors ==
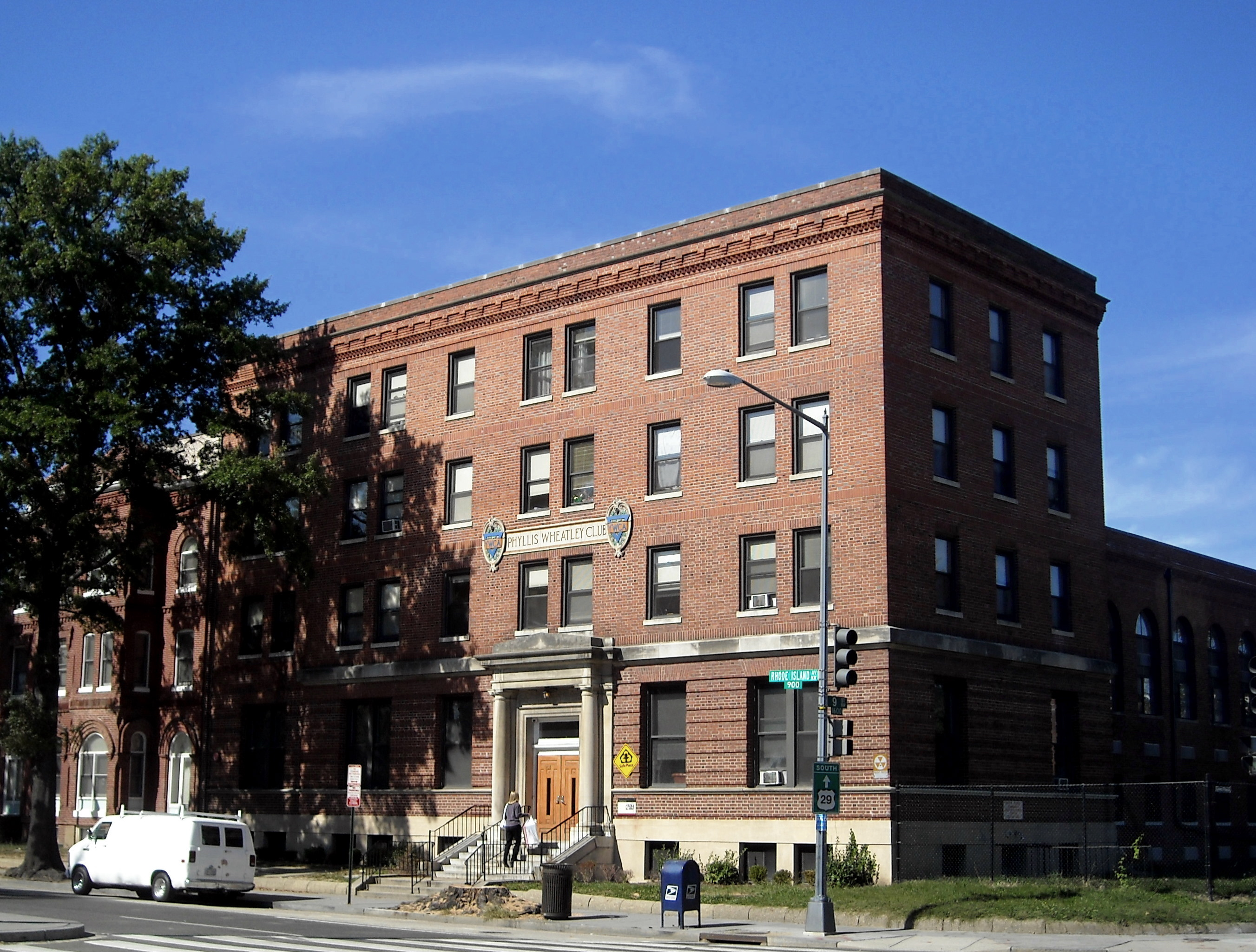
Phyllis Wheatley YWCA in the Shaw neighborhood of Washington, D.C.

With the 1773 publication of Wheatley's book Poems on Various Subjects, she "became the most famous African on the face of the earth." Voltaire stated in a letter to a friend that Wheatley had proved that black people could write poetry. John Paul Jones asked a fellow officer to deliver some of his personal writings to "Phillis the African favorite of the Nine (muses) and Apollo." She was honored by many of America's founding fathers, including George Washington, who wrote to her (after she wrote a poem in his honor) that "the style and manner [of your poetry] exhibit a striking proof of your great poetical Talents."

Critics consider her work fundamental to the genre of African-American literature, and she is honored as the first African-American woman to publish a book of poetry and the first to make a living from her writing.

- In 2002, the scholar Molefi Kete Asante listed Phillis Wheatley as one of his 100 Greatest African Americans.
- Wheatley is featured, along with Abigail Adams and Lucy Stone, in the Boston Women's Memorial, a 2003 sculpture on Commonwealth Avenue in Boston, Massachusetts.
- In 2012, Robert Morris University named the new building for their School of Communications and Information Sciences after Phillis Wheatley.
- Wheatley Hall at UMass Boston is named for Phillis Wheatley.

In 1892 a Phyllis Wheatley Circle was formed in Greenville, Mississippi. and in 1896 the Phyllis Wheatley Womans's League.

She is commemorated with a sculpture in the Boston Women's Memorial, and on the Boston Women's Heritage Trail.

The Phyllis Wheatley YWCA in Washington, D.C., and the Phillis Wheatley High School in Houston, Texas, are named for her, as are the Phillis Wheatley School in Apopka, Florida, and the historic Phillis Wheatley School in Jensen Beach, Florida, now the oldest building on the campus of American Legion Post 126 (Jensen Beach, Florida). A branch of the Richland County Library in Columbia, South Carolina, which offered the first library services to black citizens, is named for her. A branch of the Rochester Public Library system in Rochester, New York was named for her when it was built in 1971. Phillis Wheatley Elementary School, New Orleans, opened in 1954 in Tremé, one of the oldest African-American neighborhoods in the US. The Phillis Wheatley Community Center opened in 1920 in Greenville, South Carolina, and in 1924 (spelled "Phyllis") in Minneapolis, Minnesota.

On July 16, 2019, at the London site where A. Bell Booksellers published Wheatley's first book in September 1773 (at 9 Aldgate High St, now the location of the Hotel Saint, formerly the Dorsett City Hotel), the unveiling took place of a commemorative blue plaque honouring her, organised by the Nubian Jak Community Trust and Black History Walks.

Wheatley is the subject of a project and play by British-Nigerian writer Ade Solanke entitled Phillis in London, which was showcased at the Greenwich Book Festival in June 2018. A 90-minute play by Solanke titled Phillis in Boston was presented at the Old South Meeting House in November 2023.

A 30-item collection of material related to Wheatley, including publications from her lifetime containing poems by her, was acquired by the Smithsonian's National Museum of African American History and Culture in 2023.

Wheatley was featured in "Rise Up: Resistance, Revolution, Abolition" at the Fitzwilliam Museum of Cambridge University during 2025, which told the stories of abolitionists such as Wheatley.

On January 29, 2026, the United States Postal Service released a postage stamp featuring the image of Wheatley and commemorating her legacy. It is the 49th in the Black Heritage stamp series. The official ceremony took place at the Old South Meeting House in Boston, Massachusetts. Other observances were to be held in Columbia, Greenville and Charleston, South Carolina and in Camden, New Jersey.

== See also ==
- African-American literature
- Elijah McCoy
- Phillis Wheatley Club
- Slave narrative
