= 1821 in literature =

This article contains information about the literary events and publications of 1821.

== Events ==
- May – Percy Bysshe Shelley's Queen Mab: a philosophical poem (1813) is distributed by a pirate publisher in London, leading to prosecution by the Society for the Prevention of Vice.
- August 4 – Atkinson & Alexander publish The Saturday Evening Post for the first time as a weekly newspaper in the United States.
- unknown dates
  - James Ballantyne begins publishing his Novelist's Library in Edinburgh edited by Sir Walter Scott.
  - In the first known obscenity case in the United States, a Massachusetts court outlaws the John Cleland novel Fanny Hill (1748). The publisher, Peter Holmes, is convicted of printing a "lewd and obscene" novel.
  - Sunthorn Phu is imprisoned and begins his epic poem Phra Aphai Mani.

== New books ==
=== Fiction ===
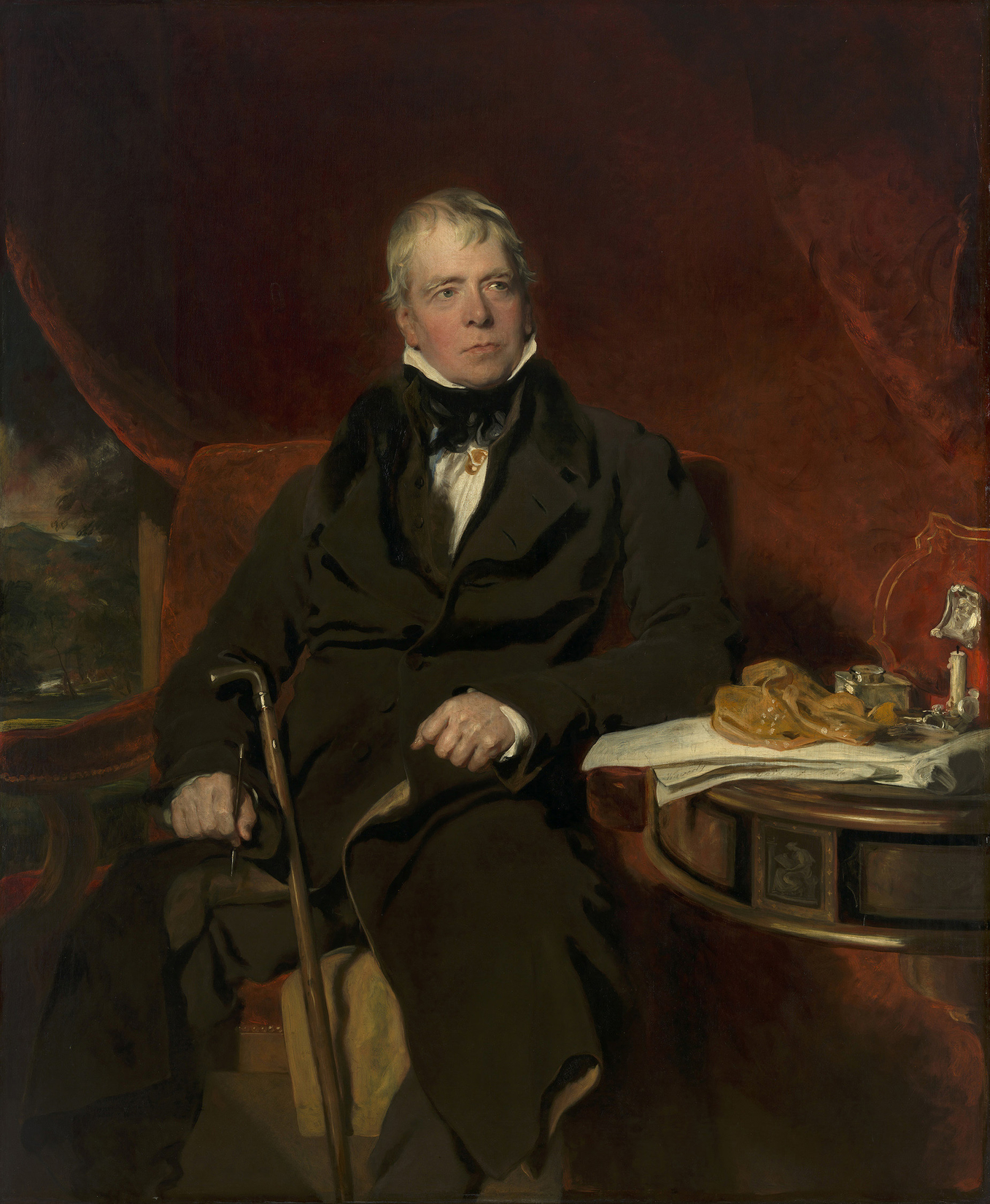
Portrait of Sir Walter Scott by Thomas Lawrence. Scott's historical novel Kenilworth was published in 1821.

- James Fenimore Cooper – The Spy
- Pierce Egan – Life in London; Boxiana Vol. III
- John Galt
  - Annals of the Parish
  - The Ayrshire Legatees
- Thomas Gaspey – Calthorpe
- Johann Wolfgang von Goethe – Wilhelm Meister's Journeyman Years (Wilhelm Meisters Wanderjahre)
- Ann Hatton – Lovers and Friends
- Hannah Maria Jones – Gretna Green
- John Gibson Lockhart – Valerius
- Charles Nodier – Smarra
- Anna Maria Porter – The Village of Mariendorpt
- Jane Porter – The Scottish Chiefs
- Sir Walter Scott – Kenilworth

=== Children ===
- Maria Hack – Harry Beaufoy; or the Pupil of Nature
- Thomas Love Peacock – Maid Marian

=== Drama ===
- John Banim and Richard Lalor Sheil – Damon and Pythias
- Lord Byron
  - Marino Faliero, Doge of Venice (published & performed)
  - Sardanapalus: a tragedy; The Two Foscari: a tragedy; Cain: a mystery (published together)
- Alfred Bunn –Kenilworth
- Barry Cornwall – Mirandola
- Alexandre-Vincent Pineux Duval – Le Faux Bonhomme
- Aleksander Fredro – Pan Geldhab (Mr. Gelhab)
- Franz Grillparzer – Das goldene Vliess (The Golden Fleece trilogy)
- James Haynes – Conscience
- Heinrich von Kleist (died 1811) – The Prince of Homburg (Prinz Friedrich von Homburg oder die Schlacht bei Fehrbellin, first performance, in abridged version as Die Schlacht von Fehrbellin; completed 1810)

=== Poetry ===
- Lord Byron – Irish Avatar
- Heinrich Heine – Poems
- Alessandro Manzoni – Il Cinque Maggio (May 5)
- Alexander Pushkin – The Gabrieliad
- Percy Bysshe Shelley – Adonaïs

=== Non-fiction ===
- James Burney – An Essay, by Way of Lecture, on the Game of Whist
- Owen Chase – Narrative of the Most Extraordinary and Distressing Shipwreck of the Whale-Ship Essex
- William Cobbett – The American Gardener
- George Grote – Statement of the Question of Parliamentary Reform
- William Hazlitt – Table-Talk
- James Mill – Elements of Political Economy
- Robert Owen – Report to the County of Lanark, of a plan for relieving public distress and removing discontent
- Thomas De Quincey (anonymously) – Confessions of an English Opium-Eater (serialisation in The London Magazine)
- John Roberton – Kalogynomia, or the Laws of Female Beauty
- Robert Southey – Life of Cromwell

== Births ==
- February 22 – Athalia Schwartz, Danish writer, journalist and educator (died 1871)
- March 15 – William Milligan, Scottish theologian (died 1893)
- March 19 – Richard Francis Burton, English polymath (died 1890)
- March 20 – Ned Buntline (Edward Zane Carroll Judson Sr.), American publisher, dime novelist and publicist (died 1886)
- March 25 – Isabella Banks, English poet and novelist (died 1897)
- April 9 – Charles Baudelaire, French poet (died 1867)
- May 8 – Charlotte Maria Tucker, English children's writer (died 1893)
- May 11 – Grigore Sturdza, Moldavian and Romanian adventurer, literary sponsor and philosopher (died 1901)
- June 30 – William Hepworth Dixon, English historian, traveler and journal editor (died 1879)
- July 21 – Vasile Alecsandri, Romanian patriot, poet, dramatist, politician and diplomat (died 1890)
- October 30 – Fyodor Dostoevsky, Russian novelist (died 1881)
- November 28 – Nikolai Alekseevich Nekrasov, Russian poet, writer and critic (died 1877)
- September 21 – Aurora Ljungstedt, Swedish horror writer (died 1908)
- September 24 – Cyprian Norwid Polish poet (died 1883)
- December 1 – Jane C. Bonar, Scottish hymnwriter (died 1884)
- December 6 – Dora Greenwell, English poet (died 1882)
- December 12 – Gustave Flaubert, French novelist (died 1880)

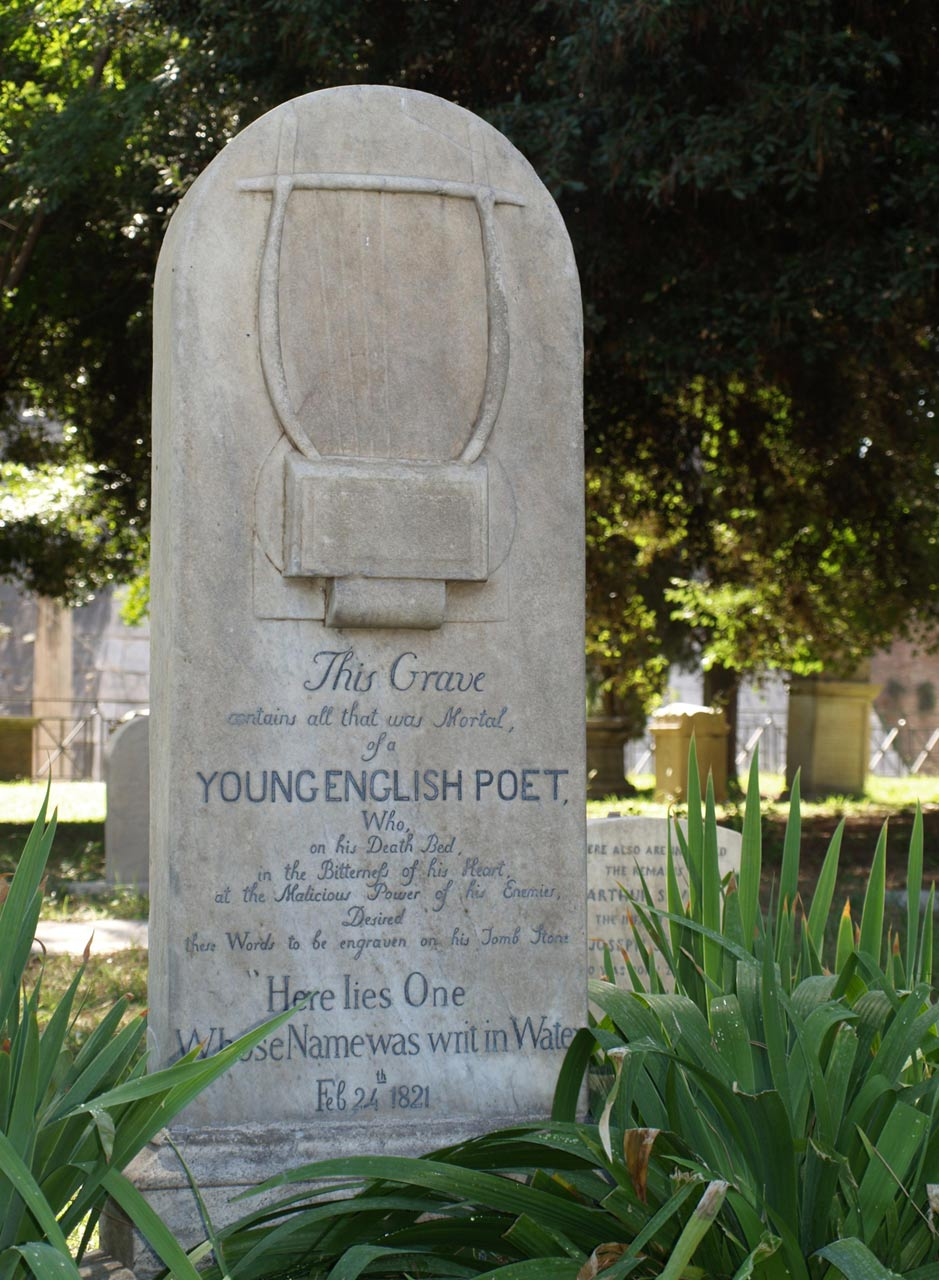
Keats's grave in Rome

== Deaths ==
- January 7 – Anne Hunter, Scottish poet and salonnière (born 1742)
- January 14 – Jens Zetlitz, Norwegian poet (born 1761)
- February 23 – John Keats, English poet (tuberculosis, born 1795)
- February 26 – Joseph de Maistre, Savoyard philosopher (born 1753)
- March 17 – Louis-Marcelin de Fontanes, French poet (born 1757)
- April 14 – Susan Carnegie, writer and founder of the first public asylum in Scotland (born 1743)
- April 16 – Thomas Scott, English cleric and religious writer (born 1747)
- May 2 – Hester Thrale (Mrs Piozzi), English diarist and arts patron (born 1741)
- May 21 – John Jones (Jac Glan-y-gors), Welsh poet and satirist (born 1766)
- May 22 – Johann Georg Heinrich Feder, German philosopher (born 1740)
- June 15 – John Ballantyne, publisher (born 1774)
- August 1 – Elizabeth Inchbald, English novelist and dramatist (born 1753)
- August 24 – John William Polidori, English physician, writer (born 1795) (suicide)
- November 17 – James Burney, English rear-admiral and naval writer (born 1750)
- November – Richard Fenton, poet and author (born 1747)

== Awards ==
- Chancellor's Gold Medal and Newdigate Prize – George Howard
