= Other Times =

1823 British novel

Other Times; or, The Monks of Leadenhall
- Title page of original edition
- Author: Thomas Gaspey
- Language: English
- Genre: Historical Romance
- Publication date: April 1, 1823; 203 years ago
- Publication place: United Kingdom
- Media type: Print

Other Times, alternatively titled The Monks of Leadenhall, is an 1823 novel in three volumes by the British writer Thomas Gaspey. A work of historical fiction, the book intertwines fictional characters with historical events late in the reign of King Henry VIII of England, most notably the 1536 Pilgrimage of Grace. It is variously described as an allegory and an early Newgate novel, although its status as a member of the latter category is often disputed.

Gaspey covers topics which would prove to be defining issues in the 19th century, such as racial discrimination, colonialism, and religious freedom.

== Plot ==
Volume one

After a preface on the difficulties of historical accuracy, Gaspey opens with three travelers trying to enter Canterbury Cathedral, having come from Continental Europe via Dover. The travelers are soon revealed to be the "Spanish" Ferdinand, his sister Mariana, and their English guide Edmund. It is revealed that the crowds of people assembled at Canterbury are present for the 'translation day' of Saint Thomas Becket, a historical figure martyred in Canterbury Cathedral in the 12th century.

The three encounter a drunken festival of people led by Nicholas Bray, former jester of the former royal almoner Cardinal Thomas Wolsey. Lord Erpingham, Edmund's employer, arranges for him to marry the noble lady Elinor, but he falls in love with Mariana. Mariana is variously described as being "Spanish" and "South American", which in 1823 would have meant she was probably of Mexican origin. Edmund is soon relieved when his fiancée elopes.

Nonetheless, Ferdinand decides to enter Mariana into a convent. Desperate to be near to her, Edmund enters the monastery of Leadenhall, presided over by Abbott Egbert, which is connected by tunnels to the convent. Edmund thrives in the monastery but nonetheless decides to escape due to discovering Egbert attempting to bury in secret the child of a nun and monk. He is captured at the end of the first volume.

Volume two

Gaspey reminds the reader of Edmund's imprisonment, before shifting focus to Clifford, a criminal friend of Edmund. He is trying to emigrate with Elinor, Edmund's former fiancée, to the New World. Edmund tries to escape from prison but repeatedly fails. With help, he is finally able to escape due to chaos outside the monastery. Egbert tries to convince Mariana to become his mistress but is refused. Egburt tries to rape her in full view of the crowd but is stopped by the monks and Mariana escapes.

Lord Erpingham, who has thus far employed Ferdinand, is reproached by him, and soon discovers that Ferdinand and Mariana are his children. Ferdinand tries to kill him, but stumbles back.

Volume three

Gaspey recapitulates the events at the end of the second volume, before Edmund meets Bray and tells him of the events at the convent. Edmund rushes to Ferdinand to tell him of the events, but interrupts Ferdinand's attempt to murder Erpingham. This interruption allows Erpingham to explain his side of the story, allowing him to reconcile with Ferdinand.

Mariana encounters several dangerous situations before being taken in by Mrs. Roper, who she later realizes is the daughter of Sir Thomas More after she observes her venerating her father's head. Erpingham goes on a search for Mariana, unaware of her whereabouts, and is mistakenly determined to have joined a rebellion against the king, namely the Pilgrimage of Grace. He is arrested under orders of the king. Clifford and Edmund mistakenly believe Erpingham has been executed and thus join the rebellion.

When the rebellion led by Robert Aske is crushed, Clifford and Edmund are deemed treasonous by the king, as is Egbert when he brings an army to participate in the rebellion. Unbeknownst to them, Erpingham was pardoned by the king. Clifford and Edmund, along with Egbert, spend a few months hiding from the authorities before they are discovered and sentenced to death.

While awaiting execution, Clifford and Edmund seem resigned to their fate, while Egbert decides to commit suicide to avoid execution. Shortly after Egbert takes poison, however, news arrives that Edmund and Egbert have been pardoned; Egbert nonetheless dies soon after, regretting his suicide. As Edmund leaves with Bray, he believes Clifford has been executed, only to realise that Henry VIII died moments before, and the royal council decided to pardon Clifford. Rejoiced at her lover's escape, Elinor proclaims that life will be better due to the death of Henry.

== Characters ==
- Edmund: main character and protagonist of the novel, servant of Lord Erpingham
- Egbert: abbot of the monastery at Leadenhall, the book's main antagonist
- Mariana: Edmund's love interest, of African or Native American ancestry
- Ferdinand: Mariana's controlling older brother
- Nicholas Bray: former jester to Thomas Wolsey
- Elinor: a noble lady, arranged to marry Edmund, but falls in love with Clifford
- Lord Erpingham: a lord who employs Edmund and opposes the actions of Henry VIII, he is also the secret father of Ferdinand and Mariana
- Clifford: a felonious friend of Edmund
- Henry VIII: nonfictional King of England, his actions drive many decisions of the fictional characters

== Scholarship ==
Like Gaspey's previous novel The Lollards, Other Times is generally considered to have represented issues of the time. These issues were primarily religious, such as the corruption of church officials which was as prevalent in Gaspey's time as that which he wrote about. Catholic emancipation was also an ongoing topic in the early 1820s, and as such it has been argued that the book's inclusion of Catholic persecution is allegorical. Gaspey received criticism in his time for poor historical accuracy.

The description of Mariana as "South American", as well as language which in 1823 may indicate that she was of African descent, may have also conveyed a political message, most likely pertaining to the impending abolition of slavery in Great Britain, which Gaspey is known to have supported.

Charles Dickens took note of Gaspey's inclusion of execution scenes in his novels, most dramatically in Other Times; writing in his diary on 31 January 1839, he notes a 'Chapter on Executioners' by Gaspey, may reference the climax of Other Times, although the description could also fit other works of Gaspey. Dickens included many scenes similar to this one in his own works.

The novel makes use of pre-chapter epigraphs, mostly from famous poets or writers from around the time of the book's setting.

University of Alberta professor Gary Kelly notes that Gaspey chooses to portray revolutionaries in a positive light, much like the general tradition of the Newgate novels of glorifying criminals. However, he notes that Gaspey seems to have supported only "certain reform issues", and that he is much more cautious in his portrayal of characters than is common in Newgate novels.

Most scholars agree, however, that Other Times predates the Newgate era. Instead, the title of the first Newgate novel is usually given to Gaspey's 1827 novel Richmond, or even the 1830 work Paul Clifford.
