= 1747 in literature =

This article contains information about the literary events and publications of 1747.

== Events ==
- March 31 – Laurence Sterne preaches the Good Friday sermon at St Helen Stonegate; The Case of Elijah and the Widow of Zerephath is later printed and published.
- April 9 – David Garrick becomes joint patentee and manager of the Drury Lane Theatre in London.
- December 1 – Samuel Richardson's two-volume epistolary novel Clarissa, or, the History of a Young Lady ("by the Editor of Pamela") begins publication in London from his own print shop, dated 1748.
- unknown date – The Załuski Library in Warsaw is opened to the public.

== New books ==
=== Prose ===
- Thomas Carte – A General History of England
- Juan de Iriarte – Discurso sobre la imperfección de los diccionarios
- Diego de Torres Villarroel – Desengaños razonables para sacudir el polvo del espanto
- Denis Diderot – La Promenade du sceptique (completed; not published until 1830)
- William Dunkin – Boetia
- Thomas Edward – A Supplement to Mr. Warburton's Edition of Shakespear
- Henry Fielding, as "John Trott Plaid" – The Jacobite's Journal (periodical)
- Sarah Fielding – Familiar Letters Between the Principal Characters in David Simple (a defense against unauthorized continuations)
- Samuel Foote – The Roman and English Comedy Consider'd
- Hannah Glasse, as "A Lady" – The Art of Cookery Made Plain and Easy
- Madame de Graffigny – Lettres d'une Péruvienne
- Henry Home, Lord Kames – Essays Upon Several Subjects Concerning British Antiquities
- Samuel Johnson – The Plan of a Dictionary of the English Language
- David Mallet – Amyntor and Theodora
- William Memoth, the younger – The Letters of Pliny the Consul
- Josiah Ralph – A Miscellany
- Samuel Richardson – Clarissa vol. i–ii
- William Shakespeare – The Works of Shakespear (edited by William Warburton)
- Tobias Smollett – Reproof
- Joseph Spence – Polymetis
- Voltaire – Zadig (in original form as Memnon)
- Horace Walpole – A Letter to the Whigs
- Joseph Warton – Ranelagh House
- Thomas Warton – The Pleasures of Melancholy

=== Drama ===
- John Cunningham – Love in a Mist
- Samuel Foote – The Diversions of the Morning or, A Dish of Chocolate
- David Garrick – Miss in Her Teens
- Christian Fürchtegott Gellert – Die zärtlichen Schwestern (The Affectionate Sisters)
- Carlo Goldoni – The Venetian Twins (I due gemelli veneziani)
- Benjamin Hoadly – The Suspicious Husband
- Edward Moore – The Foundling
- Takeda Izumo II, Miyoshi Shōraku and Namiki Senryū I – Yoshitsune Senbon Zakura (義経千本桜, Yoshitsune and the Thousand Cherry Trees, original version for bunraku puppet theatre)

=== Poetry ===
- William Blackstone (attributed) – The Pantheon
- Philip Francis – A Poetical Translation of the Works of Horace
- Charlotte Lennox – Poems
- William Mason – Musaeus: A monody to the memory of Pope (an imitation of Milton's Lycidas)
- Lady Mary Wortley Montagu – Six Town Eclogues

== Births ==
- January 11 – François Alexandre Frédéric, duc de la Rochefoucauld-Liancourt, French economics writer (died 1827)
- January 12 – Susanna Blamire, English dialect poet and songwriter (died 1794)
- January 15 – John Aikin, English biographer, activist and physician (died 1822)
- January 26 – Samuel Parr, English schoolmaster and writer, "the Whig Johnson" (died 1825)
- January – William Seward, English man of letters (died 1799)
- February 19 – John "Walking" Stewart, English traveller and philosopher (died 1822)
- March 10 – Iolo Morganwg, Welsh antiquarian, bookseller, poet and literary forger (died 1826)
- September 30 – John Mastin, English memoirist, local historian and cleric (died 1829)
- December 12 – Anna Seward, English poet (died 1809)
- Unknown date
  - John Edwards (1747–1792), Welsh poet (died 1792)
  - Thomas Scott, English cleric and religious writer (died 1821)

== Deaths ==
- January 16 – Barthold Heinrich Brockes German poet (born 1680)
- May 28 – Luc de Clapiers, marquis de Vauvenargues, essayist (born 1715)
- August
  - Charles Fleetwood, manager of Drury Lane Theatre (year of birth unknown)
  - Leonard Welsted, English poet (born 1688)
- September 7 – Michel Maittaire, French classical scholar, bibliographer and grammarian (born 1668)
- November 17 – Alain-René Le Sage, French novelist and playwright (born 1668)
- November 21 – Robert Mylne, Scottish antiquarian and writer (born 1643)
- November 22 – Joseph Trapp, poet, controversialist and translator (born 1679)
- December 23 – Étienne-François Avisse, French dramatist (born 1694)
