= The Magic of Wealth =

1821 novel

- Author: Thomas Skinner Surr
- Language: English
- Genre: Drama
- Publisher: Cadell & Davies
- Publication date: 1815
- Publication place: United Kingdom
- Media type: Print

The Magic of Wealth is an 1815 novel by the British writer Thomas Skinner Surr, published in three volumes by Cadell & Davies in London. It focuses on the development of a new resort town by financial speculators. Surr negatively contrasts the speculative banker behind the development with the traditional elite represented by the local squire. Thematically it is similar to Jane Austen's unfinished Sanditon (1817) and Walter Scott's Saint Ronan's Well (1823). Surr's criticism of banks and financial speculation was a common theme in other novels of the era, including Thomas Gaspey's Calthorpe (1821).

== Bibliography ==
- Burwick, Frederick Goslee, Nancy Moore & Hoeveler Diane Long . The Encyclopedia of Romantic Literature. John Wiley & Sons, 2012.
- Jackson-Houlston, C.M. Gendering Walter Scott: Sex, Violence and Romantic Period Writing. Taylor & Francis, 2017.
- Michie, Ranald. War On Wealth, The: Fact And Fiction In British Finance Since 1800. World Scientific, 2023.
