= 1822 in literature =

This article contains information about the literary events and publications of 1822.

== Events ==
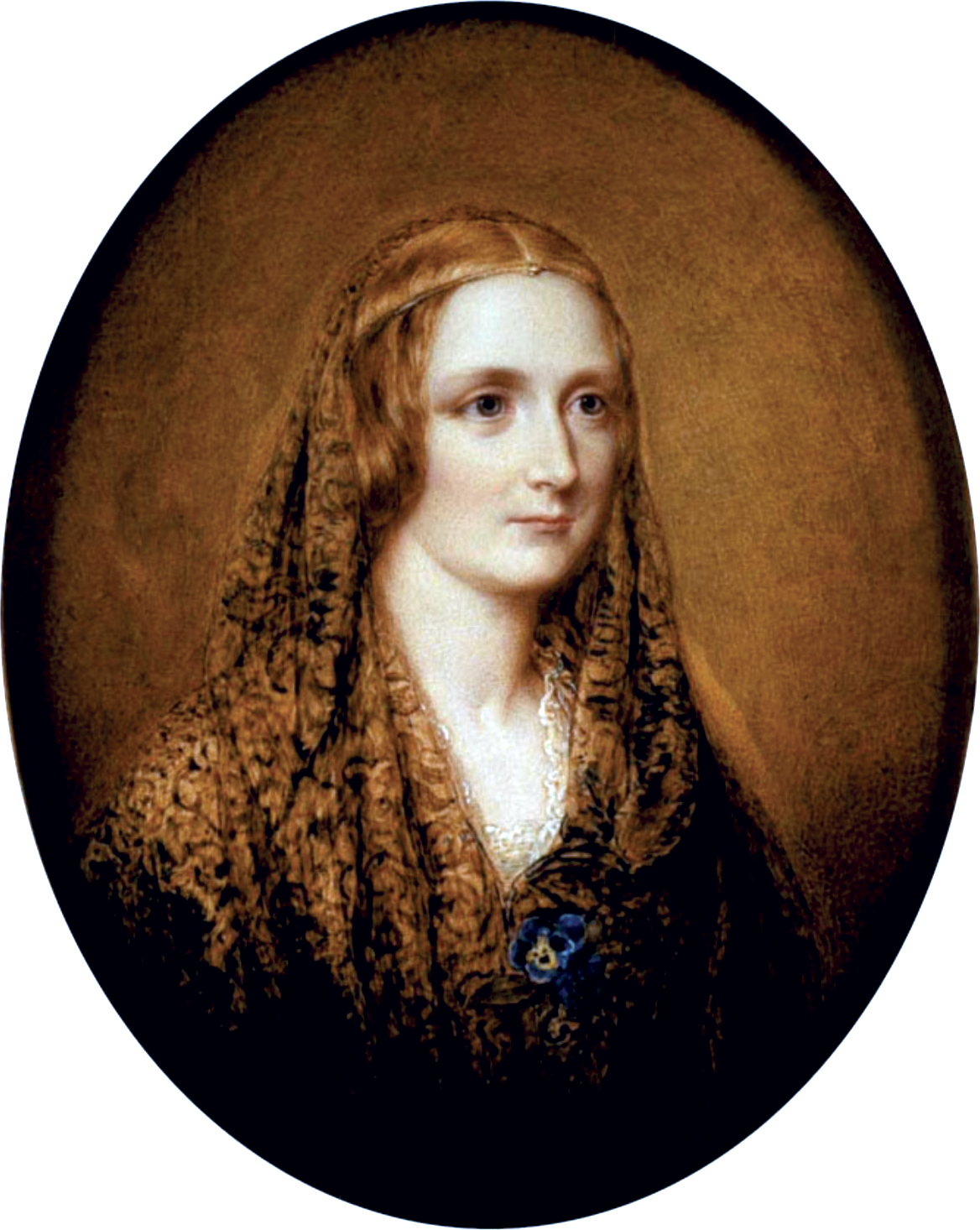
Reginald Easton's miniature of Mary Shelley is allegedly drawn from her death mask (c. 1857).

- March – The Noctes Ambrosianae, imaginary colloquies, begin to appear in Blackwood's Magazine (Edinburgh).
- June 16 – Shortly after moving into the isolated Villa Magni, at the sea's edge near the hamlet of San Terenzo in the Bay of Lerici, Mary Shelley miscarried, losing so much blood that she nearly died. Rather than wait for a doctor, her husband Percy Bysshe Shelley sat her in a bath of ice to stanch the bleeding, an act the doctor later told him saved her life. All was not well between the couple that summer, however, and Percy spent more time with his love interest Jane Williams than with his depressed and debilitated wife. Much of the short poetry Shelley wrote at San Terenzo involved Jane rather than Mary.
- July 18 – The body of English poet Percy Bysshe Shelley, is washed up on the beach near Viareggio in Italy, ten days after he left Livorno (where he set up The Liberal magazine with Leigh Hunt) for Lerici, where Shelley had been living with his wife Mary; his boat, the Don Juan, had sunk in a storm in the Ligurian Sea. His body is cremated on the beach in the presence of Lord Byron and Edward John Trelawny, who claims to have seized Shelley's heart from the flames.

== New books ==
=== Fiction ===
- Richard Henry Dana Sr. – Paul Felton
- Kenelm Henry Digby – The Broad-Stone of Honour
- Thomas Gaspey – The Lollards
- Sarah Green – Nuptial Discoveries
- Jane Harvey – Singularity
- Ann Hatton – Guilty or Not Guilty
- James Hogg – "The Three Perils of Man"
- Washington Irving – Bracebridge Hall
- Lady Caroline Lamb – Graham Hamilton
- John Neal (anonymously) – Logan, a Family History
- John Gibson Lockhart – Adam Blair
- Charles Nodier – Trilby
- Anna Maria Porter – The Hunters of the Pyrenees
- Rosalia St. Clair – Clavering Tower
- Sir Walter Scott (as "the author of Waverley")
  - The Fortunes of Nigel
  - The Pirate
- Catharine Maria Sedgwick – A New England Tale

=== Short stories ===
- Ernst Raupach – "Wake Not the Dead"

=== Children and young people ===
- Hans Christian Andersen – Ghost at Palnatoke's Grave
- Charlotte Anley – Influence. A Moral Tale for Young People
- Susannah Moodie – Spartacus
- Mary Martha Sherwood – The History of Henry Milner
- Agnes Strickland – The Moss-House: In Which Many of the Works of Nature Are Rendered a Source of Amusement to Children

=== Drama ===
- Franz Grillparzer – The Golden Fleece (Das goldene Vlies)
- Alessandro Manzoni – Adelchi
- Richard Lalor Sheil – The Huguenot

=== Poetry ===
- Lord Byron – The Vision of Judgment
- António Feliciano de Castilho – Primavera
- Eleanor Anne Porden – Cœur de Lion
- Alexander Pushkin - The Prisoner of the Caucasus
- Percy Bysshe Shelley – Hellas

=== Non-fiction ===
- Thomas de Quincey (anonymously) – Confessions of an English Opium-Eater (book publication)
- John Claudius Loudon – An Encyclopaedia of Gardening

== Births ==
- February 10 – Eliza Lynn Linton, English novelist and journalist (died 1898)
- February 22 – Frances Elizabeth Barrow, American author of children's stories (died 1894)
- May 26 – Edmond de Goncourt, French literary critic and publisher (died 1896)
- December 24 – Matthew Arnold, English poet (died 1888)
- Boleslav Markevich, Russian writer (died 1884)

== Deaths ==
- March 19 – Józef Wybicki, Polish poet (born 1747)
- March 27 – Sir Alexander Boswell, 1st Baronet, Scottish politician, poet, songwriter and antiquary, killed in duel (born 1775)
- June 25 – E. T. A. Hoffmann, German Romantic writer (born 1776)
- July 8 – Percy Bysshe Shelley, English poet and radical (born 1792)
- December 7 – John Aikin, English physician and miscellanist (born 1747)
- December 8 – Saul Ascher, German political writer and translator (born 1767)

== Awards ==
- Chancellor's Gold Medal – John Henry Bright
- Newdigate Prize – A. Barber

== Sources ==
- Gittings, Robert and Jo Manton. Claire Clairmont and the Shelleys. Oxford: Oxford University Press, 1992. ISBN 0-19-818594-4.
- Norman, Sylva (1953). "Shelley's Last Residence". Keats–Shelley Journal. 2 (Jan). Keats–Shelley Association of America: 1–10. JSTOR 30212475.
- Holmes, Richard. Shelley: The Pursuit. 1974. London: Harper Perennial, 2003. ISBN 0-00-720458-2.
- Seymour, Miranda. Mary Shelley. London: John Murray, 2000. ISBN 0-7195-5711-9.
- Spark, Muriel. Mary Shelley. London: Cardinal, 1987. ISBN 0-7474-0318-X.
- Sunstein, Emily W. Mary Shelley: Romance and Reality. 1989. Baltimore, MD: Johns Hopkins University Press, 1991. ISBN 0-8018-4218-2.
