= Eugenius Roche =

Anglo-French journalist

Eugenius Roche (1786–1829) was an Anglo-French journalist. He is often identified as Irish: his background was certainly Irish, but in the 19th century his own version of his background, that he was born in Paris, was widely accepted.

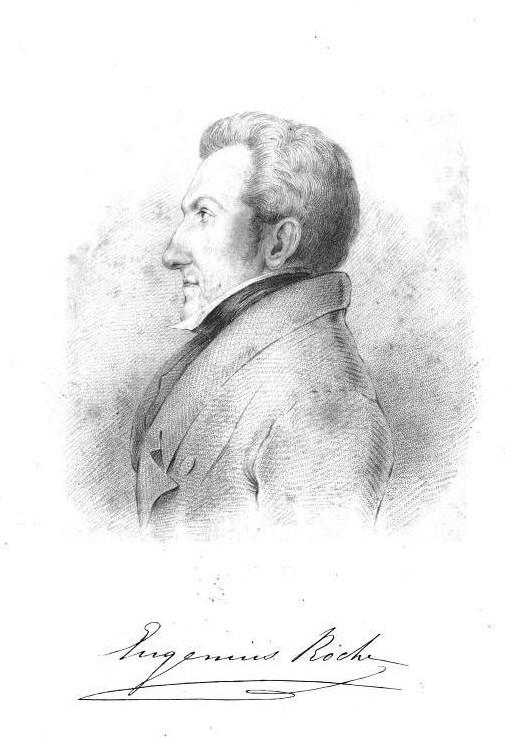
Eugenius Roche, 1830 engraving after a drawing from 1824 by William Home Clift

== Early life ==
Roche was born on 23 February 1786 in Paris, where his father who educated him was professor of modern languages in the École Militaire. At age 18 he went to London, where he began work as a journalist.

== Journalist ==
In 1807 Roche started a periodical Monthly Literary Recreations, for Ben Crosby, then Lord Byron's publisher. It was not a financial success, but published Byron, Allan Cunningham, and other poets. Cunningham wrote in it as "Hidallan": Roche offered to make him a partner in the publication, but was turned down. Another contributor was Thomas Gaspey. In 1808 Roche began The Dramatic Appellant, a quarterly journal whose object was to print rejected plays of the period; it was not a conspicuous success.

In 1809 Roche became parliamentary reporter of The Day, of which he was appointed editor the same year. His reporting position was filled by Vincent George Dowling. The poet Peter Lionel Courtier became a protégé of Roche's, and followed him to his later publications.

The Day was highly complimentary in 1810 about the integrity of Spencer Perceval, Prime Minister from October 1809, and very understanding about the financial panic of 29 September of that year, caused by the suicide of the financier Abraham Goldsmid. While editing it, however, Roche was sentenced to a year's imprisonment in the Marshalsea Prison, in 1811, for an attack on the government over the case of Sir Francis Burdett. The charge was seditious libel; Roche argued that he had not seen the offending material. The language used included the phrase "wanton desire of shedding blood", of soldiers dispersing crowds when Burdett was being taken to the Tower of London, enough to convict the proprietors of The Day even at a time when the judicial attitude to libels was softening.

On his release Roche became editor of the National Register, a weekly paper. He sold it to the émigré Jacques Regnier; but Regnier had serious financial difficulties, and they affected Roche also. In August 1813 he accepted a position on The Morning Post, becoming its subeditor, a position he held from 1817 to 1827, under Nicholas Byrne.

Roche edited the New Times 1827–8, as successor to its founder John Stoddart. He then edited The Courier 1828–9, after William Mudford had been removed for his support of George Canning.

== Death and legacy ==
Roche died, heavily in debt, on 9 November 1829 in Hart Street, Bloomsbury. His obituary in Fraser's Magazine described the circumstances: he had paid heavily for a small share in The Courier, and had remarried about 18 months before. No support from the government could be expected. Frederick Knight Hunt gave a different version, the debts being associated to those of the New Times, into which he had bought, and secured against the freehold of his house.

== Works ==
In the Dramatic Appellant were two of Roche's own dramas, "William Tell" and "The Invasion". The former was a dark-toned melodrama, based on the version of the William Tell story in Jean-Pierre Claris de Florian's rendition. It was being rehearsed when Drury Lane Theatre was destroyed by fire on 24 February 1809.

A sum was subscribed for Roche's widow (second wife) and family, and his poems were collected and published by subscription, with a memoir and portrait, as London in a Thousand Years (1830). The title poem, a long work touched by apocalyptic thought, has been described as "not so much a Last Man narrative as a promenade among ruins".

== Family ==
In 1809 Roche married Mary Jane Oliver, who died in 1827. His second wife was also from the Oliver family: he left her a widow, with nine children, one being her own. The sons included the barrister Henry Philip Roche. Another son was Alfred R. Roche (died 1876), in business and a figure of Canadian history, who was the first secretary of the Colonial Society, and husband of Harriet A. Roche the writer.

== Notes ==
Attribution

This article incorporates text from a publication now in the public domain: Lee, Sidney, ed. (1897). "Roche, Eugenius". Dictionary of National Biography. Vol. 49. London: Smith, Elder & Co.
