= Thomas Skinner Surr =

19th century English novelist

- Born: 1770
- Died: 15 February 1847 (aged 76–77)
- Writing career
- Language: English
- Notable work: A Winter in London

Thomas Skinner Surr (1770–1847) was an English novelist whose most famous work was A Winter in London (1806). This popular tale of fashionable London life initiated a small genre of "season novels" and influenced silver fork novels in the 1820s and 1830s.

== Life ==
Surr's father was the grocer John Surr; his mother Elizabeth (née Skinner) was the sister of alderman Thomas Skinner, who was Mayor of London in 1794. He was baptised on 20 October 1770 at St Botolph's, Aldersgate. On 18 June 1778 he began school at Christ's Hospital, which he left on 7 November 1785. After this, he became a clerk at the Bank of England, and eventually became principal of the drawing office.

Surr married Mary Ann Griffiths, the sister-in-law of Richard Phillips, on 13 August 1799. He died at his home in North End, Fulham on 15 February 1847.

== Works ==
Surr wrote several novels, including Consequences (1796), The Magic of Wealth (1815), and Richmond, or, Scenes in the Life of a Bow Street Officer (1827), some of which were translated into French or German. The Encyclopedia of Romantic Literature calls him "perhaps the most famous author of novels of 'fashionable life'".

=== George Barnwell ===
Surr's three-volume novel George Barnwell; or, The Merchant's Clerk (1798) is an adaption of George Lillo's play The London Merchant (1731), itself based on a seventeenth century broadside ballad. It was inspired by Sarah Siddons, who played Millwood in a 1796 production of the play at Drury Lane. The plot concerns an apprentice named Barnwell who arrives in London and is seduced by Millwood, a prostitute; they embezzle from Barnwell's master and murder his uncle for money. The first volume includes a subplot about an abandoned, possibly haunted, abbey which is thought to be the meeting place of a secret society. Eventually, Millwood betrays Barnwell to the law; both are arrested and die.

In the novel, Barnwell is torn between his parents' desire for him to enter the world of work, and intellectual interests shared with his atheist and republican friend Mr Mental, a radical philosopher. The critique of Mr Mental's modern philosophy is one expression of Surr's conservative point of view, which is shown throughout his works. In this context, M. O. Grenby discussed it as an example of then-contemporary anti-Jacobin fiction.

=== A Winter in London ===
Surr's most famous novel was A Winter in London, or Sketches of Fashion, a bestseller which went into thirteen editions. The plot is a mixture of romance, fashionable novel, and Gothic. A baby, Edward, survives a shipwreck and is adopted by the Dickens family. His childhood is shown in the first volume; in the second, he enters London society, guided by a doctor who provides information and satirical commentary. There is a subplot about usurpation, involving Edward's true father; in the end, Edward is restored to his inheritance and marries one of the Dickens daughters.

Its popularity owed a great deal to its depictions of upper-class wealthy life. In particular, one of the characters, the confused and continually-defrauded Duchess of Belgrave, is a parody of Georgiana, Duchess of Devonshire. She is tricked into bribing someone to stop publishing a libellous memoir, and when she tries to pawn a friend's jewels is robbed by the maid she sends to the pawn shop. The real Georgiana was "dreadfully hurt" by this portrayal; Elizabeth Wynne Fremantle wrote in her diary that the Duke said it had given her a "death blow"; Samuel Rogers and Sydney Owenson also suggested that the novel hastened her death.

A Winter in London contains several descriptions of upper-class conspicuous consumption, intended to satisfy the curiosity of the middle class; however, unlike other season novels, Surr had a conservative streak and criticised the nouveau riche. It has also been written about for its interest in and detailed descriptions of clothing, problematising the novel's satirical aspects. This emphasis on clothes has been suggested as an influence on Maria Edgeworth's Tales of Fashionable Life and on Walter Scott's use of clothing in Waverley.

A Winter in London is an example of the fashionable novel, intermediate between Frances Burney's Evelina and "silver fork" novels of the 1820s and 1830s. In the wake of its success, a subgenre called the "season novel" appeared and was popular for a few years. These imitators, like A Winter in London, had titles including a brief period of time and the name of a fashionable location; many also include satirical depictions of upper-class life. Later season novels, beginning with the anonymous A Winter in Bath, are often patterned around infidelity or divorce, include a scene at a ball where the protagonist is lectured on notable society figures, and feature real people, sometimes under their real names.

=== Other works ===
Surr's other writing included "Christ's Hospital: a Poem" (1797), commemorating his admission to the school. He also wrote three pamphlets on banking. One, which rebutted a pamphlet by Walter Boyd attacking the Bank of England, asserted the Bank's independence from the Government. Titled A Refutation of Certain Misrepresentations Relative to the Nature and Influence of Bank Notes and of the Stoppage of Specie at the Bank of England upon the Price of Provisions (1801), it has been called a foreshadowing of banking theory for its statement that the Bank could not issue notes which had lost their value.

== Bibliography ==
=== Novels ===
- Consequences (1796)
- George Barnwell; or, The Merchant's Clerk (1798)
- Splendid Misery (1801)
- A Winter in London, or Sketches of Fashion (1806)
- The Magic of Wealth (1815)
- Richmond (1827, also attributed to Thomas Gaspey)
- Russell: or, The Reign of Fashion (1830)

=== Other works ===
- "Christ's Hospital: a Poem" (1797)
- A Refutation of Certain Misrepresentations Relative to the Nature and Influence of Bank Notes and of the Stoppage of Specie at the Bank of England upon the Price of Provisions (1801)
