= The Self-Condemned =

1836 novel

- American first edition
- Author: Thomas Gaspey
- Language: English
- Genre: Historical
- Publisher: Richard Bentley
- Publication date: 1836
- Publication place: United Kingdom
- Media type: Print

The Self-Condemned is an 1836 historical novel by the British writer Thomas Gaspey, published in three volumes by Richard Bentley in London. Set in Elizabethan Ireland, it was the first novel Gaspey had published since George Godfrey in 1828 due to his work on The Sunday Times. In a preface he acknowledged the assistance of the Irish antiquarian Thomas Crofton Croker for the historical background. The American edition was released by Harper and Brothers in New York. The principle characters are Edmund Nagle an Irish chieftain and his sister Grace, at the time of the Munster Plantation and Desmond Rebellion.

== Bibliography ==
- Burwick, Frederick Goslee, Nancy Moore & Hoeveler Diane Long. The Encyclopedia of Romantic Literature. John Wiley & Sons, 2012.
- Kelly, Gary (ed.) Newgate Narratives, Volume 3. Routledge, 2017
