= Richard Dagley =

English painter

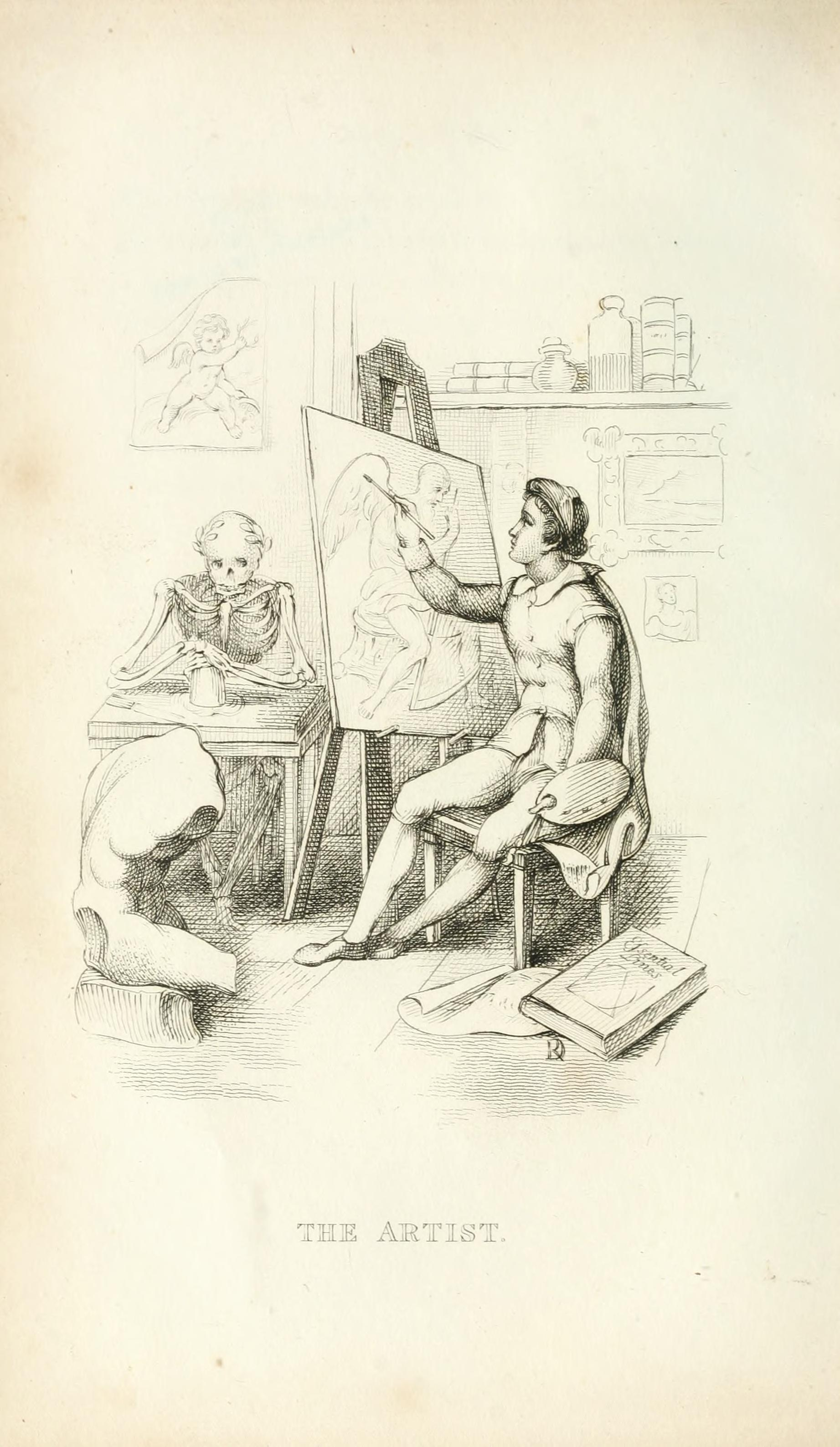
Death's doings, by Richard Dagley

Richard Dagley (29 January 1761 – 1 April 1841) was an English subject painter and illustrator.

== Life ==
Dagley was born on 3 December 1761 and baptised on 29 January 1762 at St Margaret's, Westminster, the son of Samuel Dagley, member of the Curriers' Company who died the following year, and his wife, Ann. He was educated at Christ's Hospital, from 1770 until 1777, when he was apprenticed to a jeweller and watchmaker, whose daughter, Elizabeth Cousen, he married on 2 November 1785 at St James's, Westminster. According to his obituary the couple had ten children, although only one, their daughter Elizabeth Frances Dagley (1788–1853), who became an author of children's books, survived into adulthood.

He exhibited irregularly at the Royal Academy between 1785 and 1833, showing a total of 60 works, mostly genre pictures He was active in diverse artistic fields: he did some work enamelling watches and jewellery in collaboration with his friend Henry Bone, made several medals, painted watercolours, and spent some time as a drawing-master at a girls' school in Doncaster.

Dagley wrote art criticism for the Literary Gazette, and published his first book, Gems Selected from the Antique, in 1804, with plates he had drawn and engraved himself. He published a drawing manual in 1818 and a second volume on gems in 1822, with poems by George Croly.

He produced some humorous illustrations for Isaac D'Israeli's Flim-Flams (1805) and a poem called Takings by Thomas Gaspey (1821), for which he wrote an introductory essay entitled 'Miscellaneous Observations on the Ludicrous in Art'. In a preface he noted:

... nearly twenty years since, while selecting and drawing from the casts of antique gems, for a publication that has since appeared, I was called upon to, make designs for the "Flim-Flams," a work of an entirely opposite character. Having never paid any attention to the ludicrous in art, it was rather in compliance with the wishes of the author of that work, than with any expectation of success that I produced my specimens. Their reception was favourable, and a hint from an ingenious friend on the use which might be made of the word "Taking," was a stimulus to further practice; of which you now see the result.

His Death's Doings (1826) was a meditation on death, prompted by the example of by Holbein's Dance of Death. Dagley wrote "I have endeavoured to show the way a certain class of writing may be embellished without incurring the expense of those laboured and highly finished engravings which make a work prohibitively expensive".

A portrait in pastel of Dagley by John Raphael Smith survives.

== Publications ==
- Gems Selected from the Antique (1804).
- "Flim-Flams! or the Life and Errors of my Uncle, and the Amours of my Aunt, with Illustrations and Obscurities, by Messrs. Tag, Rag, and Bobtail (1805). In fact by Isaac D'Israeli.
- A compendium of the theory and practice of drawing and painting (1818). Described in the subtitle as "illustrated by the technical terms in art: with practical observations on the essential lines and the forms connected with them. Adapted to the earliest state of instruction, for the use of school or private tuition. To which is added, the practice of the pencil, chalk, tinted, and water-colour, drawing".
- Takings; or the Life of a Collegian (1821). Poem by Thomas Gaspey, with 26 etchings from designs by Dagley.
- Gems principally from the antique: drawn and etched by Richard Dagley; with illustrations in verse by the Rev. George Croly (1822).
- Death's Doings (1826), described as "consisting of numerous original compositions, in prose and verse, the friendly contributions of various writers; principally intended as illustrations of 24 plates by R. Dagley". An enlarged edition with 30 plates appeared in 1827.

== Death ==
Dagley died of influenza at his home, 5 Earl's Court Terrace, London, on 1 April 1841, and was buried at St Mary Abbots, Kensingtons.

== In Literature ==
In 1822 Letitia Elizabeth Landon published three poems in the Literary Gazette based on his drawings. She further produced a poem on his Cupid and Swallows Flying from Winter in her Poetical Sketches of Modern Pictures (The Troubadour, 1825). Later, she supplied a further four poems for Death’s Doings, 1827 edition. Felicia Hemans also provided two poems for Death’s Doings.
