= Elizabeth Frances Dagley =

Elizabeth Frances Dagley (1788–1853), sometimes publishing under her initials as E. F. D., was an English writer of children's literature in the Regency Era. She published four books.

== Biography ==
Dagley was the daughter of the artist and educator Richard Dagley. Her writing, although for children, "articulates the problems and misery of economic insecurity".

Dagley died in 1833.

== Published works ==
- Fairy Favours, and other tales. 1825.
- The Birthday, and other tales. 1828.
- The Village Nightingale: with other tales. 1829.
- The Young Seer or, Early Searches into Futurity. 1834.
