= 1748 in literature =

List of years in literature	(table)
- … 1738; 1739; 1740; 1741; 1742; 1743; 1744; 1745; 1746; 1747; 1748; 1749; 1750; 1751; 1752; 1753; 1754; 1755; 1756; 1757; 1758 …
- In poetry 1745 1746 1747 1748 1749 1750 1751
- Art; Archaeology; Architecture; Literature; Music; Philosophy; Science; +...

This article contains information about the literary events and publications of 1748.

== Events ==
- January – The play Yoshitsune Senbon Zakura (義経千本桜, Yoshitsune and the Thousand Cherry Trees, by Takeda Izumo II, Miyoshi Shōraku and Namiki Senryū I) receives its Kabuki première in Ise. In May, it receives its first Edo performance at the Nakamura-za and in August first performances in Osaka at the Naka no Shibai.
- October 19 – David Garrick revives Philip Massinger's play A New Way to Pay Old Debts (written c. 1625) in London.
- November 21 – The first instalment of Memoirs of a Woman of Pleasure, also known as Fanny Hill, is published anonymously by John Cleland to raise money to free himself from the London debtors' prison. It is considered by some to be the first modern erotic novel.
- December 18 – The Royal Danish Theatre is founded, with the opening of the King's Theatre in Copenhagen.
- unknown dates
  - Leonhard Euler publishes, in Berlin, one of the two works for which he will be most renowned: the Introductio in analysin infinitorum. Euler's fifth paper on nautical topics, E137, is also written in this year but not published until 1750.
  - The Gospel of Matthew in the Manx language, as Yn Sushtcml scruit liorish yn Noo Mian, is the first translation of a New Testament text into that language, under the auspices of the Society for Promoting Christian Knowledge.

== New books ==
=== Prose ===
- Richard Walton – Anson's A Voyage Round the World
- Jean-Baptiste de Boyer, Marquis d'Argens (attributed) – Thérèse philosophe
- John Cleland – Memoirs of a Woman of Pleasure (also known as Fanny Hill)
- Denis Diderot
  - Les Bijoux indiscrets (The Indiscreet Jewels, novel)
  - Memoires sur differents sujets de mathematique
- Eliza Haywood – Life's Progress through the Passions (novel)
- James Hervey – Meditations and Contemplations
- David Hume – An Enquiry Concerning Human Understanding
- Edmond Hoyle – Mr. Hoyle's Treatises of Whist, Quadrille, Piquet, Chess and Back-Gammon (collected edition)
- William Kenrick – The Town
- Montesquieu – De l'Esprit des lois (The Spirit of the Laws)
- Laetitia Pilkington – Memoirs
- Samuel Richardson (anonymously) – Clarissa, vols. ii – vii (earlier vols. dated 1748 actually published 1747)
- Thomas Sheridan – The Simile
- Tobias Smollett
  - The Adventures of Roderick Random
  - English translation of The Adventures of Gil Blas of Santillane by Alain-René Le Sage
- François-Vincent Toussaint – Les Mœurs
- Voltaire – Zadig (in final form)
- Horace Walpole – A Second and Third Letter to the Whigs
- John Wesley – A Letter to a Person Lately Join'd with the People call'd Quakers
- Peter Whalley – An Enquiry into the Learning of Shakespeare
- Diego de Torres Villarroel – De los temblores y otros movimientos de la tierra llamados vulgarmente terremotos

=== Drama ===
- Jean-François Marmontel – Denys le Tyran
- Edward Moore – The Foundling
- Takeda Izumo II, Miyoshi Shōraku and Namiki Senryū – Kanadehon Chūshingura (仮名手本忠臣蔵, original version for bunraku puppet theatre)
- Alexander Sumarokov – Gamlet: Tragediya (adapted from Shakespeare's Hamlet)

=== Poetry ===
- Mark Akenside – An Ode to the Earl of Huntingdon
- Robert Dodsley – A Collection of Poems (a publisher's anthology)
- Friedrich Gottlieb Klopstock (anonymously) – Der Messias (first three cantos)
- Mary Leapor (died 1746) – Poems
- Ambrose Philips – Pastorals, Epistles, Odes and Other Original Poems
- James Thomson – The Castle of Indolence
- Thomas Warton – Poems

See also 1748 in poetry

== Births ==
- January 1 – Gottfried August Bürger, German poet (died 1794)
- February 15 – Jeremy Bentham, English philosopher (died 1832)
- April 27 – Pierre-Louis Ginguené, French author (died 1815)
- May 7 – Olympe de Gouges, French dramatist (died 1793)
- November 1 – Francesco Galeani Napione, Italian historian (died 1830)
- November 8 – Anne Seymour Damer, English sculptor and novelist (died 1828)
- December 14 – Louis-François de Bausset, French cardinal, writer, and academician (died 1824)
- unknown date – Józef Maksymilian Ossoliński, Polish politician, writer, and researcher (died 1829)

== Deaths ==
- March 11 – Charles Johnson, English dramatist and publican (born 1679)
- April 3 – Jean-Jacques Burlamaqui, Swiss political theorist and man of letters (born 1694)
- April 13 – Christopher Pitt, English poet and translator (born 1699)
- August 27 – James Thomson, Scottish-born poet (born 1700)
- September 21 – John Balguy, English philosopher (born 1686)
- November 25 – Isaac Watts, English hymnist, theologian, and logician (born 1674)
