= George Godfrey (novel) =

1828 novel

- Author: Thomas Gaspey
- Language: English
- Genre: Mystery, Romance
- Publisher: Henry Colburn
- Publication date: 1828
- Publication place: United Kingdom
- Media type: Print

The History of George Godfrey is an 1828 novel by the British writer Thomas Gaspey, originally published in three volumes. Written in the first person as a bildungsroman, the plot contains a murder mystery and makes reference to financial frauds as well as the ongoing Greek War of Independence. At one point the title character is transported to Australia as a criminal. Like Gaspey's 1827 work Richmond, it is an example of the Newgate novel.

== Bibliography ==
- Burwick, Frederick Goslee, Nancy Moore & Hoeveler Diane Long. The Encyclopedia of Romantic Literature. John Wiley & Sons, 2012.
- Knight, Stephen. Towards Sherlock Holmes: A Thematic History of Crime Fiction in the 19th Century World. McFarland, 26 Jan 2017.
- Watson, Kate. Women Writing Crime Fiction, 1860-1880: Fourteen American, British and Australian Authors. McFarland, 2014.
