= Philip Francis (translator) =

Irish priest and translator

Philip Francis (19 July 1708 – 5 March 1773) was an Anglo-Irish clergyman and writer, now remembered as a translator of Horace.

== Life ==
He was son of Dr. John Francis, rector of St. Mary's, Dublin (from which living he was for a time ejected for political reasons), and dean of Lismore, and was born in 1708. He was sent to Trinity College, Dublin, taking the degree of B.A. in 1728, and was ordained, according to his father's wish, in the Church of Ireland. He held for some time the curacy of St. Peter's parish, Dublin, and while resident in that city published his translation of Horace, besides writing in the interests of ‘the Castle.’

Soon after the death of his wife, Elizabeth Rowe, whom he married in 1739, he crossed to England, and in 1744 obtained the rectory of Skeyton in Norfolk. He shortly was residing for the sake of literature and society in London. In January 1752, when Edward Gibbon became an inmate of his house, Francis was keeping or supposed to be keeping a school at Esher; but the boys' friends quickly found that the nominal instructor preferred the pleasures of London to the instruction of his pupils and in a month or two Gibbon was removed. To maintain himself in the social life of London, Francis tried many expedients, but most of them were failures. Two plays of his were produced on the stage, each time without success. He tried translation, but, except in his rendering of the works of Horace, he was sidelined by other writers.

His fortune was made when he secured, through the kindness of Miss Bellamy, who recommended him, the post of private chaplain to Lady Caroline Fox, and lived in her family, where he taught Lady Sarah Lennox to declaim and Charles James Fox to read. At the end of 1757 Fox was sent to Eton, and Francis accompanied him to assist the boy in his studies. The father, Henry Fox found Francis a useful ally. It has sometimes been said that he was the chief writer in the paper called ‘The Con-test,’ which lived from November 1756 to August 1757, but the accuracy of this statement is doubted. He is also said to have contributed to the ‘Gazette’ daily newspaper on behalf of the court interest.

When William Pitt the Elder resigned, in 1761, Francis wrote a libel against him under the title of ‘Mr. Pitt's Letter Versified,’ the notes to which, according to Horace Walpole, were supplied by Henry Fox (now Lord Holland), and he followed this with ‘A Letter from the Anonymous Author of “Mr. Pitt's Letter Versified,”’ in which he reflected on Pitt's indifference to the truculent language of Colonel Isaac Barré. In 1764 he attacked Pitt and John Wilkes with great bitterness in the ‘Political Theatre.’

On 22 June 1761 he was inducted to the vicarage of Chilham in Kent, but resigned in the summer of 1762, and through Lord Holland's influence he held from May 1764 to 1768 the chaplaincy at Chelsea Hospital, and the rectory of Barrow, Suffolk, to which he was instituted on 26 February 1762, and which he retained until his death. He was also recommended in January 1764 by George Grenville for a crown pension. Francis was still unsatisfied. He quarrelled with Lord Holland because he had not been made an Irish bishop, and threatened to expose his patron's villainy.

In June 1771 he was seized by a paralytic stroke, and after lingering for some years died at Bath 5 March 1773. He was fond of his son Sir Philip Francis, and numerous letters to and from him are in the son's memoir; he resented his son's marriage, but they were later reconciled.

== Works ==
Of his rendering of Horace, Samuel Johnson said: ‘The lyrical part of Horace never can be perfectly translated. Francis has done it the best. I'll take his five out of six against them all.’ The first part, consisting of the ‘Odes, Epodes, and Carmen Seculare of Horace in Latin and English,’ in which he was assisted by William Dunkin, was issued at Dublin in two volumes in 1742. It was republished in London in the next year, and in 1746 two more volumes, containing the ‘Satires, Epistles, and Art of Poetry,’ appeared with a dedication in prose to Robert Jocelyn, lord chancellor of Ireland. The whole version was reissued in 1747, and it ran into many subsequent editions, that edited by Edward Dubois being the best. It was also included in the set of poets edited by Alexander Chalmers, the ‘British Poets,’ vols. xcvii–viii., and in Charles Whittingham's ‘Greek and Roman Poets,’ vol. xii.

Francis worked in 1751 on his play of ‘Eugenia,’ an adaptation of the French tragedy of ‘Cenie,’ and it was acted at Drury Lane Theatre on 17 February 1752, but was unsuccessful; Lord Chesterfield attributed its failure to the fact that pit and gallery did not like a tragedy without bloodshed. A similar failure attended his play of ‘Constantine,’ which was produced at Covent Garden on 23 February 1754, and expired on the fourth night. Genest styles it ‘a cold and uninteresting play, the plot avowedly taken in part from a French piece.’ Both pieces were printed, the former being dedicated to the Countess of Lincoln, and the latter to Lord Chesterfield.

For eight years he was employed in studying the ‘Orations’ of Demosthenes, and his translation appeared in two volumes in 1757–8, but it was thought inferior to that by Thomas Leland.

An anonymous volume by John Taylor was printed in 1813 with the title of A Discovery of the Author of the “Letters of Junius,” founded on Evidence and Illustrations. It attributed the authorship of the Letters of Junius to Francis and his son, Sir Philip Francis, and claimed that all the peculiarities of language in the writings of the elder Francis are discernible in some parts of Junius. Contemporary scholarly consensus is that the son was the author.
