= Charles Fleetwood (theatre manager) =

Charles Fleetwood (died 1747) was an English gentleman with an interest in theatre. He eventually became the manager of the Theatre Royal, Drury Lane, in partnership with Colley Cibber and, sometime later, Charles Macklin.

== Family ==
Fleetwood's father was Thomas Fleetwood and his mother was Frances Gerard, whose brother was Charles, the sixth Baron Gerard. He was the couple's only son. He fell heir to a large estate from a relative of his mother's when he was twenty-one years of age but lost most of it gambling. Fleetwood married Susanna Williams (born 1714), a dancer and actress. The couple had two children, Charles and John, who both made stage appearances.

== Theatre Royal, Drury Lane ==
The last of Fleetwood's inheritance was used to buy the patent for the Theatre Royal, Drury Lane from John Highmore in 1734. Highmore had owned half of the patent and Fleetwood paid £2,250 for it; at the same time Fleetwood bought Robert Wilks' share for £1,500 giving him five-sixths of the patent ownership. (Note: The remaining one-sixth share of the patent was likely still held in the name of Cardell Goodman; the date of his death is uncertain but thought to be after 1713.) Charles Macklin was given the role of stage manager as Fleetwood had no experience in theatrical administration. During Fleetwood's tenure at Drury Lane, he introduced a number of reforms including the abolition of the Footman's Gallery. This gallery was provided for the servants and lackeys of the ladies and gentlemen in the audience and generally it was noisy and disorderly. When this gallery was abolished in 1737, riots broke out in the theatre. Fleetwood's interest in the theatre began to recede and by the end of the 1737–38 season, he resumed his heavy gambling leaving control of the Theatre's finances to the treasurer, Pierson. Fleetwood's management was artistically noteworthy but a financial disaster due to his gambling; profits from the Theatre were used to fund the bets.

His most notable achievement at Drury Lane was Macklin's portrayal of Shylock in The Merchant of Venice in 1741; he was also responsible for bringing in David Garrick after his first season at the Goodman's Fields Theatre to perform at Drury Lane in 1742. Financial problems continued to beset Fleetwood and takings at the theatre were insufficient so he mortgaged the patent for the theatre and secured a loan against other paraphernalia at Drury Lane to the bankers Amber and Green. Increases in the price of entry tickets caused brawls to break out during November 1744, which was possibly the trigger for Fleetwood selling the patent to the bankers a few weeks later in December. Payment took the form of a lump sum, either £3,200 or £6,750, plus an annuity. (Note: The figure given for the annuity varies: Brayne quotes £600 whereas Dobbs states £500.) The re-payment of the £5,000 mortgage on the theatre would, however, have been deducted from the lump sum.

== Death ==
After the sale of the Drury Lane theatre patent, Fleetwood moved to the Chalon-sur-Saône area in France sometime in the spring of 1745. He died there, seemingly insolvent, in August 1747.
