= Harriet A. Roche =

Canadian author

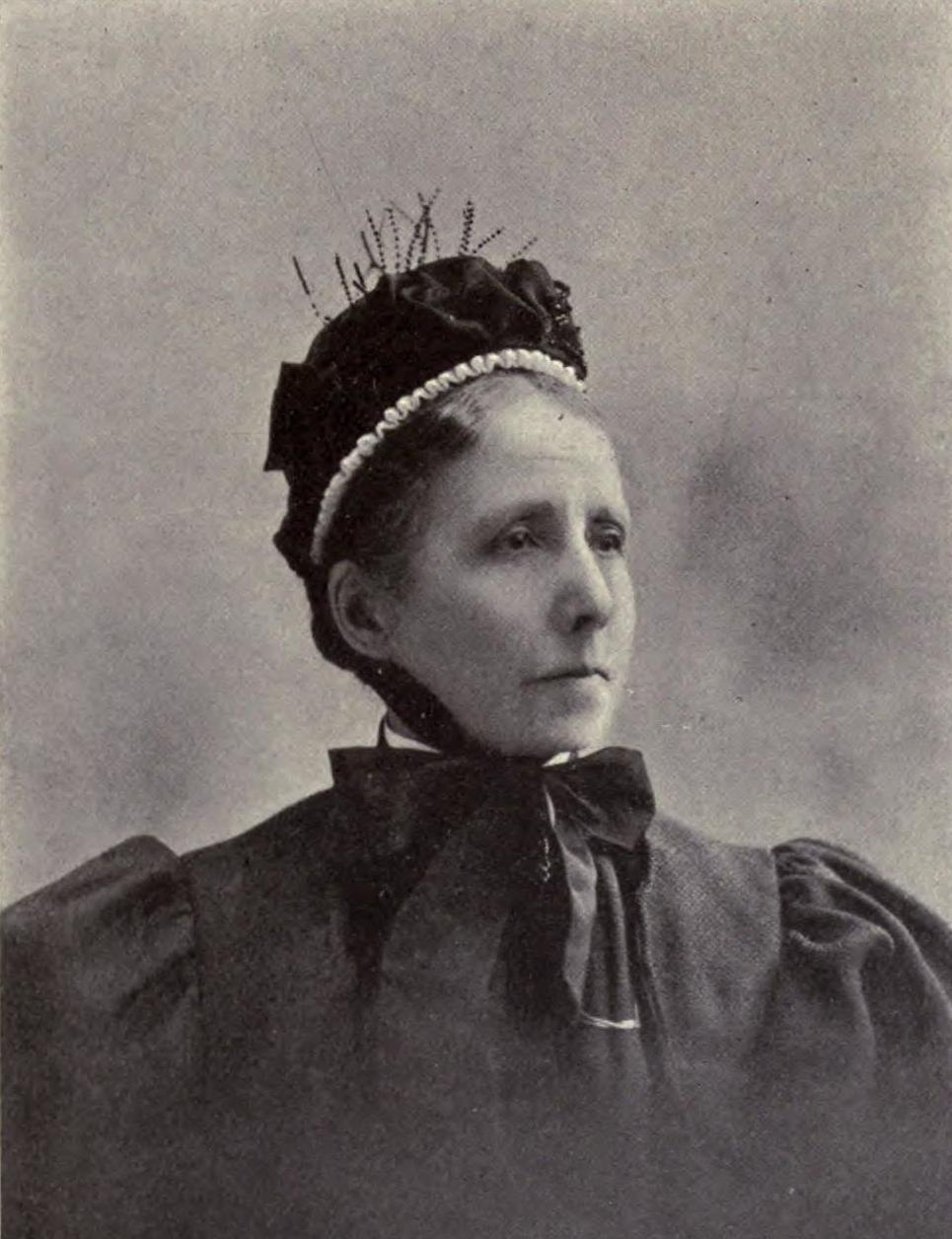
- Harriet A. Roche
- Born: Harriet Mills; 10 July 1835; Bishop's Hull, England
- Died: 1 March 1921 (aged 85); London, Ontario, Canada
- Occupation: Author
- Spouses: Alfred R. Roche (m. 1858–1876) Micail Boomer (m. 1878–1888)

Harriet A. Boomer (née Mills; 10 July 1835 – 1 March 1921), better known by her married name Harriet A. Roche, was a Canadian author.

Roche first came to Canada from England with her sister and her mother in 1851, after her mother accepted a teaching position in the Red River Colony. Roche and her mother returned to England in 1857. In 1858, she married Alfred Robert Roche. The couple traveled to the Transvaal in 1875, but became ill. Alfred died during their return voyage. Roche married her second husband, Rev. Micail or Michael Boomer, of the Diocese of Huron, Ontario, Canada in 1878. She published two books about her experiences: On Trek in the Transvaal; or, Over Berg and Veldt in South Africa (1878) and Notes From Our Log in South Africa; and, On Foot Through the Colonies At the Paris Exhibition (1880).

== Overview ==
Roche was born on 10 July 1835 in Bishop's Hull, England, to solicitor Thomas Milliken Mills and his wife Ann Benton Mills. Her father died when his wife was only 25. She supported herself and her daughters by teaching.

=== Education ===
Roche, while not Canadian born, can be considered a Canadian woman author. She emigrated from England to Canada in 1851, with her mother (Mrs. Mills). They were followed by her older sister Mary Louisa (Miss Mills). They had to travel by sea, river and portage, by way of Hudson Bay, to reach the Red River Colony. When she followed them, Miss Mills traveled from York Factory under the care of Mr. Thos. Sinclair.

Mrs. Mills and her two daughters came to the settlement to take over a girls' school established by Bishop David Anderson. A new building was erected for the school and it was given the name of St. Cross. Mrs. Mills is said to have been very thorough in her instruction and management. The young ladies were trained in all the social etiquette of the day in addition to the more solid education imparted. Miss Mills (the elder daughter) assisted her mother with the music and modern languages. Miss Harriet Mills (the younger daughter) was more of a companion to the girls, and accompanied them on walks, in winter on the frozen river, in summer towards the plain.

On 4 March 1856, Mary Louisa Mills (the elder daughter) was married to Francis Godschall Johnson, recorder of Rupert's Land, afterwards Judge Johnson, and for a time governor of Assiniboia. Later still, he was created Sir Francis Johnson, and a judge of the supreme court of Canada.

Soon after her elder daughter's marriage Mrs. Mills left Red River. Harriet and her mother returned to England in 1857, where her mother was appointed the principal of Queen's College, Harley Street, London, England. Harriet attended the lectures to continue her education.

From 1869 to 1872, Mrs. Mills took charge of the Hellmuth Ladies' College, in London, Ontario, Canada at the request of its founder, Bishop Isaac Hellmuth.

=== First marriage ===
On 11 March 1858, Roche married Alfred Robert Roche (1819–1876) in Staplegrove, England, one of the parishes of Taunton, in Somerset. A geologist, Alfred Roche had served with the Spanish Legion, and spent time in Canada. He became the first honorary secretary of the Royal Colonial Institute, (later the Royal Commonwealth Society), founded in 1868 in London, England.

When her husband went to the Transvaal in 1875, Roche accompanied him to South Africa. Both became ill, Mr. Roche severely so. They tried to return home in early 1876, but he died at sea on 4 December 1876, during the journey. Roche's book, On Trek in the Transvaal; or, Over Berg and Veldt in South Africa was published in London by Sampson Low, Marston, Searle & Rivington, in 1878.

=== Second marriage ===
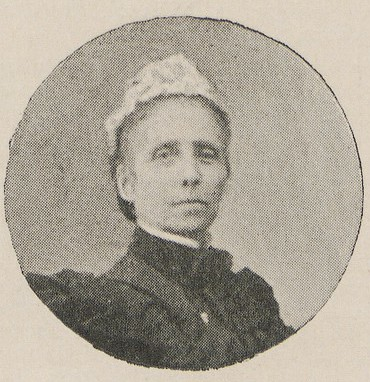
Boomer as depicted in Program of 1899 International Congress of Women at which she was a representative of Canada

After her return to Canada, Roche married her second husband, Rev. Micail or Michael Boomer, of the Diocese of Huron, Ontario on 17 November 1878. Michael Boomer was born in Ireland, and educated at the Royal Belfast Academical Institution, and at Trinity College, Dublin, having graduated from the latter in 1838, and there receiving the honorary degree of Doctor of Laws, in 1860. He came to Canada in 1840; was ordained as a Deacon of the Anglican Church the same year by Bishop John Strachan, and as a Priest the following year. He was appointed to the mission of Galt, a position which he retained for more than thirty years.

Roche's second book, Notes From Our Log in South Africa; and, On Foot Through the Colonies at the Paris Exhibition, was published in London, Ontario by the Free Press Printing Company, 1880. The title page indicates the author as "Harriet A. Boomer, author of On Trek in the Transvaal". Dean Boomer died March 4, 1888.

During the remainder of her life, Roche performed volunteer work associated with the Church of England and was an active public speaker. She served as a member of the school board of London, Ontario, where she lived, and as president of the Toronto Local Council of Women (TLCW) circa 1900. She was a prominent member of the National Council of Women of Canada, which she helped to found in 1893. She was described as displaying "racy humor and sound common sense" at their meetings. She was regarded by Ishbel Hamilton-Gordon, Marchioness of Aberdeen and Temair as a personal friend and "a great feature in our National Council, for her tact & sense of humour has helped us over many a rough place." She served as President of the London Council and Vice-President for Ontario. At some point after Dean Boomer's death, she published Little Miss Ellerby and her big elephants: respectfully dedicated to all whom it may concern, a juvenile "dream" that is really about reducing parish debt.

Roche presented a talk at the International Congress of Women in London, England, in 1899, speaking about children, religion, and education: it was published as "Connection between Home and School Life", by H. A. Boomer in volume two, Women in Education, of The International Congress of Women 1899, in seven volumes.

Roche died on 1 March 1921, in London, Ontario, Canada.
