= Irish Avatar =

1821 pamphlet by Lord Byron

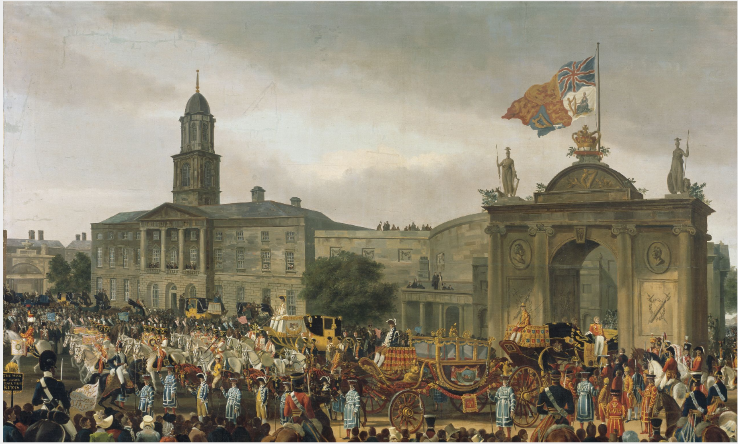
A painting of King George IV's royal visit to Ireland, which inspired Byron to write Irish Avatar.

Irish Avatar is an 1821 pamphlet by George Gordon Byron, 6th Baron Byron, known as Lord Byron.

It was not officially published during Byron's lifetime, but later appeared in The Examiner in 1822 and Thomas Medwin's Conversations of Lord Byron in 1824.

== Background ==
At the beginning of the nineteenth century, the so-called "Irish Question", regarding the response of the British government to rising nationalistic sentiments in Ireland, began to once again emerge into the public consciousness. The "question" had been exacerbated by the ultimately unsuccessful uprising by the United Irishmen in 1798, inspired by the French Revolution.

As a result of pressure from the opposition as well as Ireland, the incumbent government administration was forced to repeal portions of the Penal laws and grant increased authority to the Irish parliament. However, on January 1, 1801, under the Acts of Union, the kingdoms of Great Britain and Ireland were merged into the United Kingdom; the Irish parliament was abolished, and Irish representatives received seats in the British parliament. The act increased Irish support for home rule in Ireland.

Lord Byron was impressed by Lines on the Entry of the Austrians into Naples, which was written by Irish writer Thomas Moore in 1821. Therefore, he conceived the Irish Avatar as a work in the same vein, attacking the "servile Irish" as Moore had attacked the capitulating Neapolitan soldiers.

== Contents of the pamphlet ==
Byron wrote the pamphlet Irish Avatar after the royal visit by King George IV to Ireland. Byron criticised the attitudes displayed by the Irish people towards the Crown, an institution he perceived as oppressing them, and was dismayed by the positive reception George IV received during his visit. In the satirical pamphlet, Byron lambasted Irish unionists and voiced muted support towards Irish nationalism. He describes King George IV having been received by a 'legion of crooks, and an army of slaves.'

== Reception ==
Thomas Moore expressed positive criticism for the Irish Avatar, and had written in his journal that he had "Received Lord Byron's tremendous verses against the King & the Irish for their late exhibition in Dublin – richly deserved by my servile & hollow-hearted countrymen".

== Byron and Ireland ==
Byron had expressed concerns over the "Irish Question" in letters which dated back to the years he was a student at Cambridge University. In his second speech to the House of Lords, which he delivered on 21 April 1812, Byron spoke in defense of the civil rights of Irish Catholics. The formal reason for the speech was a proposal to set up a committee to investigate the complaints of Irish Catholics. However, from the outset, Byron made it clear that he perceived their complaints to be part of a larger nationalist movement. In the speech, Byron warned of the danger of favoring Irish Protestants over Catholics, warning that this would only increase the sectarian divide in the country. Byron also castigated several British politicians for their indifference to Irish affairs in the speech.
