= 1748 in philosophy =

1748 in philosophy

== Publications ==
- David Hume's An Enquiry Concerning Human Understanding
- Montesquieu's The Spirit of the Laws
- Julien Offray de La Mettrie's Man a Machine
- Voltaire's Zadig ou la Destinée

== Births ==
- February 6 - Adam Weishaupt (died 1830)
- February 15 - Jeremy Bentham (died 1832)
- April 3 - Dietrich Tiedemann (died 1803)
- April 27 - Adamantios Korais (died 1833)
- May 7 - Olympe de Gouges (died 1793)

== Deaths ==
- April 3 - Jean-Jacques Burlamaqui
