= Newgate novel =

Genre of crime novels set in 1820s–1840s

The Newgate novels (or Old Bailey novels) were novels published in England from the late 1820s until the 1840s that glamorised the lives of the criminals they portrayed. Most drew their inspiration from the Newgate Calendar, a biography of famous criminals published during the late 18th and early 19th centuries, and usually rearranged or embellished the original tale for melodramatic effect. The novels caused great controversy, and drew criticism in particular from the novelist William Makepeace Thackeray, who satirised them in several of his novels and attacked the authors openly.

== Works ==
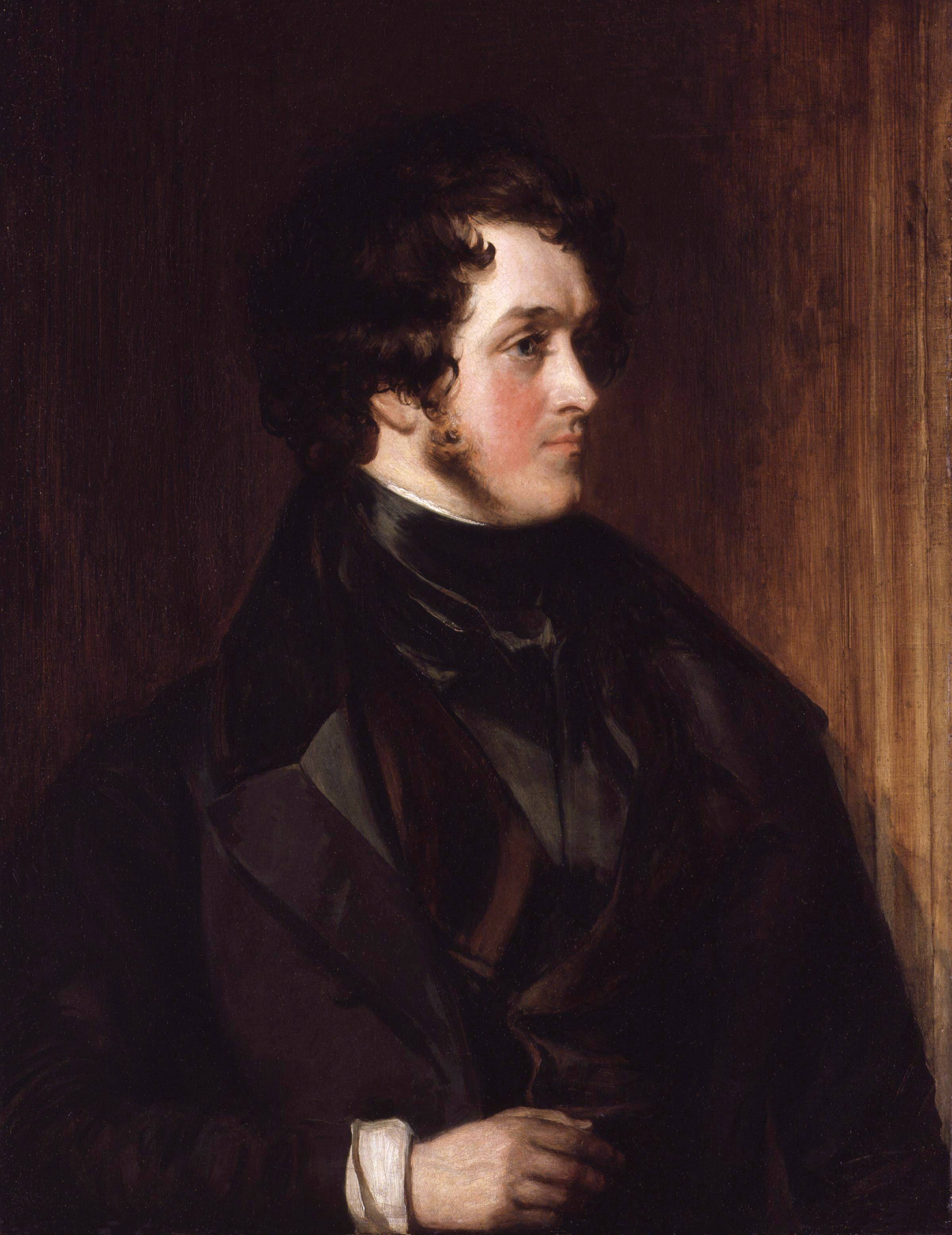
Portrait of William Harrison Ainsworth by Daniel Maclise. Ainsworth wrote notable Newgate novels such as Rookwood (1834) and Jack Sheppard (1839)

Among the earliest Newgate novels were Thomas Gaspey's Richmond (1827) and The History of George Godfrey (1828), Edward Bulwer-Lytton's Paul Clifford (1830) and Eugene Aram (1832), and William Harrison Ainsworth's Rookwood (1834), which featured Dick Turpin. Charles Dickens' Oliver Twist (1837) is often also considered to be a Newgate novel. The genre reached its peak with Ainsworth's Jack Sheppard published in 1839, a novel based on the life and exploits of Jack Sheppard, a thief and renowned escape artist who was hanged in 1724. Thackeray, a great opponent of the Newgate novel, reported that vendors sold "Jack Sheppard bags", filled with burglary tools, in the lobbies of the theatres where dramatisation of Ainsworth's story were playing and "one or two young gentlemen have already confessed how much they were indebted to Jack Sheppard who gave them ideas of pocket-picking and thieving [which] they never would have had but for the play".

Thackeray's Catherine (1839) was intended as satire of the Newgate novel, based on the life and execution of Catherine Hayes, one of the more gruesome cases in the Newgate Calendar: she conspired to murder her husband and he was dismembered; she was burnt at the stake in 1726. The satirical nature of Thackeray's story was lost on many, and it is often characterised as a Newgate novel itself.

== Decline ==
The 1840 murder of Lord William Russell by his valet, François Benjamin Courvoisier, proved so controversial that the Newgate novel came under severe criticism. Courvoisier was reported to have been inspired to the act by a dramatisation of Ainsworth's story. Although Courvoisier later denied that the play had influenced him, the furore surrounding his case led the Lord Chamberlain to ban the performance of plays based on Jack Sheppard's life, and sparked off a press campaign which attacked the writers of Newgate novels for irresponsible behaviour. Courvoisier's execution led to further controversy. It was one of the best attended hangings of the era, and Thackeray and Dickens both witnessed the execution, Thackeray using it for the basis of his attack on capital punishment, "On Going to See a Man Hanged". His most vigorous attack in the piece was reserved for Dickens, specifically for Oliver Twist, which Thackeray regarded as glorifying the criminal characters it depicted:

Bah! what figments these novelists tell us! Boz, who knows life well, knows that his Miss Nancy is the most unreal fantastical personage possible; no more like a thief's mistress than one of Gesner's shepherdesses resembles a real country wench. He dare not tell the truth concerning such young ladies.

It was believed that the character of Fagin was based on the real pickpocket Ikey Solomon, but while Dickens did nothing to discourage this perceived connection, he was at pains not to glorify the criminals he created: Bill Sikes is without redeeming features, and Fagin seems pleasant only in comparison to the other grotesques Oliver meets as his story unfolds.

The Newgate novel was also attacked in the literary press, with Jack Sheppard described as a "one of a class of bad books, got up for a bad public" in The Athenaeum, and Punch published a satirical "Literary Recipe" for a startling romance, which began "Take a small boy, charity, factory, carpenter's apprentice, or otherwise, as occasion may serve – stew him down in vice – garnish largely with oaths and flash songs – Boil him in a cauldron of crime and improbabilities. Season equally with good and bad qualities ...". The attacks were enough to make Ainsworth and Lytton turn to other subjects; Dickens continued to use criminals as the central characters in many of his stories.

Among the last of the pure Newgate novels was T. P. Prest's 1847 story of love among criminals, Newgate: A Romance. The form melded into the sensation novels and early detective fiction of the 1850s and 1860s. The former included transgressions outside the purely criminal, such as Wilkie Collins's The Woman in White (1859); an early example of the latter is The Moonstone (1868), again by Collins. All were often serialised in a form that gave rise to the penny dreadful magazines.
