= The Gabrieliad =

Humorous poem widely believed to have been written by Alexander Pushkin

The Gabrieliad (Russian: «Гавриилиада», Gavriiliada) is a humorous poem on the subject of the Annunciation widely believed to have been written by Alexander Pushkin in April 1821, while he was in his student years.

== Synopsis ==
The Gavriiliada is a satiric description of the beginning of the New Testament, primarily making fun of the virgin birth and God's ineptness. In Pushkin's narrative, Mary, the mother of Jesus, a young and attractive Jewish girl, is married to an old and impotent carpenter who has taken her as wife only to keep house. God chooses her to be the mother of Jesus and sends Archangel Gabriel to announce the good news. Satan learns about God's plan and arrives first in the form of a snake to seduce and deflower Mary. Gabriel arrives too late to save her from Satan but manages to drive him off with an illegal punch to testicles. Then he quickly has his way with Mary, who had already seen him in a vision and was impatiently waiting for him. The next morning, God in the form of a dove flies into Mary's bedroom and has intercourse with her, thus thinking He has conceived Jesus.

== Case of Gavrieliad ==
The poem was written anonymously because the author could be prosecuted for blasphemy by the Holy Synod. In 1828, an official investigation of the alleged authorship by Pushkin started. After initially denying writing the poem, Pushkin admitted it in a letter to Nicholas I.
