= Calthorpe (novel) =

1821 novel

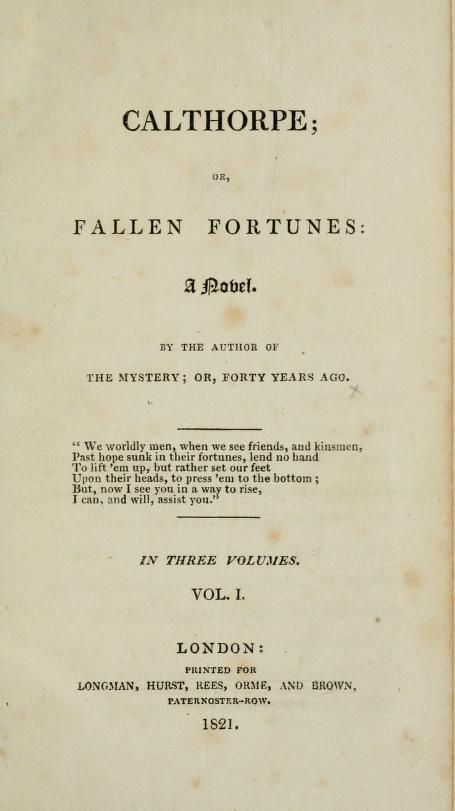
- Author: Thomas Gaspey
- Language: English
- Genre: Drama
- Publisher: Longman, Hurst, Rees and Orme
- Publication date: 1821
- Publication place: United Kingdom
- Media type: Print

Calthorpe, or Fallen Fortunes is an 1821 novel by the British writer Thomas Gaspey. It was published in three volumes by the London firm Longman, Hurst, Rees and Orme. Partly set in Germany amongst British merchants, it contains a murder mystery. The negative portrayal of banks and financiers is a recurring theme in British literature of the era.

== Bibliography ==
- Burwick, Frederick Goslee, Nancy Moore & Hoeveler Diane Long . The Encyclopedia of Romantic Literature. John Wiley & Sons, 2012.
- Michie, Ranald. War On Wealth, The: Fact And Fiction In British Finance Since 1800. World Scientific, 2023.
