= William Dunkin =

Irish poet

William Dunkin D.D. (1706/7–1765) was an Irish cleric, schoolmaster and poet.

== Life ==
William Dunkin was born in Dublin c.1709. His parents died when he was young, and he was left in early life to the charge of Trinity College, Dublin, by an aunt who left her property to the college with the condition that it should provide for his education and advancement in life. He took his B.A. degree in 1729, and D.D. in 1744.

As a young man, Dunkin had a reputation for foolish acts and clever poems. He was introduced to Jonathan Swift, who became a patron. His ordination by the Archbishop of Cashel in 1735 and the increase of the annuity which he received from Trinity College from £70 to £100 in 1736 were both due to Swift's intercession; his marriage and other imprudent acts were overlooked. In 1739 Swift attempted to procure the living of Coleraine for him, but was not successful. At that time Dunkin was keeping a school at Dublin, and in August 1746 Lord Chesterfield, with whom he had some intimacy, appointed him to the mastership of Portora Royal School, Enniskillen, which he held until his death on 24 November 1765.

== Writing ==
Swift speaks of him as "a gentleman of much wit and the best English as well as Latin poet in this kingdom". Writing of the "Vindication of the Libel", he also says "that poem was, I know, written by my very worthy friend Dr. Dunkin, with whom I have spent many a jovial evening; he was a man of genuine true wit and a delightful companion."

=== Excerpt from The Poet's Prayer by Dunkin ===
If e'er in thy sight I found favour, Apollo,
Defend me from all the disasters which follow:
From the knaves and the fools, and the fops of the time,
From the drudges in prose, and the triflers in rhyme:
From the patch-work and toils of the royal sack-bibber,
Those dead birth-day odes, and the farces of CIBBER:
From servile attendance on men in high places,
Their worships, and honours, and lordships, and graces;
From long dedications to patrons unworthy,
Who hear and receive, but will do nothing for thee:
From being caress'd to be left in the lurch,
The tool of a party, in state or in church:
From dull thinking blockheads, as sober as Turks,
And petulant bards who repeat their own works:
From all the gay things of a drawing-room show,
The sight of a Belle, and the smell of a Beau:
From busy back-biters, and tatlers, and carpers,
And scurvy acquaintance of fidlers and sharpers: ...

== Works ==
Dunkin wrote:

- Techrethyrambeia sive poëma in P. Murphorum Trin. Coll. subjanitorem, Dublin, 1730; a translation of Techrethyrambeia (Dublin, 1728). The neo-Latin mock epic appeared in 1729 in The Tribune by Patrick Delany. The English translation of 1730 was by Joseph Cowper.
- Carbery Rocks (the English version of Carberiæ Rupes), published among Swift's poems
- The Lover's Web, (Dublin, 1734)
- Epistola ad Franciscum Bindonem arm., cui adjiciuntur quatuor Odæ, (Dublin, 1741)
- Hymen's Triumph, a poem in the Gentleman's Magazine for 1743
- a prologue at the opening of a Dublin hospital, in the Gentleman's Magazine for 1745
- The parson's revels (1746), Ed. with notes and introd. by Catherine Skeen, Dublin : Four Courts Press, 2010, 978-1-84682-227-8
- Bœotia, a poem, (Dublin, 1747)
- The Bramin, an eclogue to Edm. Nugent, esq., (London, 1751) (Nugent was apparently an old pupil)
- An Ode on the death of Frederick, P. of Wales, with remarks by P. H. M. D', (Dublin, 1752)
- An Epistle to the Rt. Hon. Philip, Earl of Chesterfield, (Dublin, 1760)
- The Poet's Prayer, a poem in the Annual Register for 1774
- Select Poetical Works, (Dublin, 1769–70)
- Poetical Works, to which are added his Epistles to the Earl of Chesterfield, (Dublin, 1774).
