= Richmond (novel) =

1827 novel

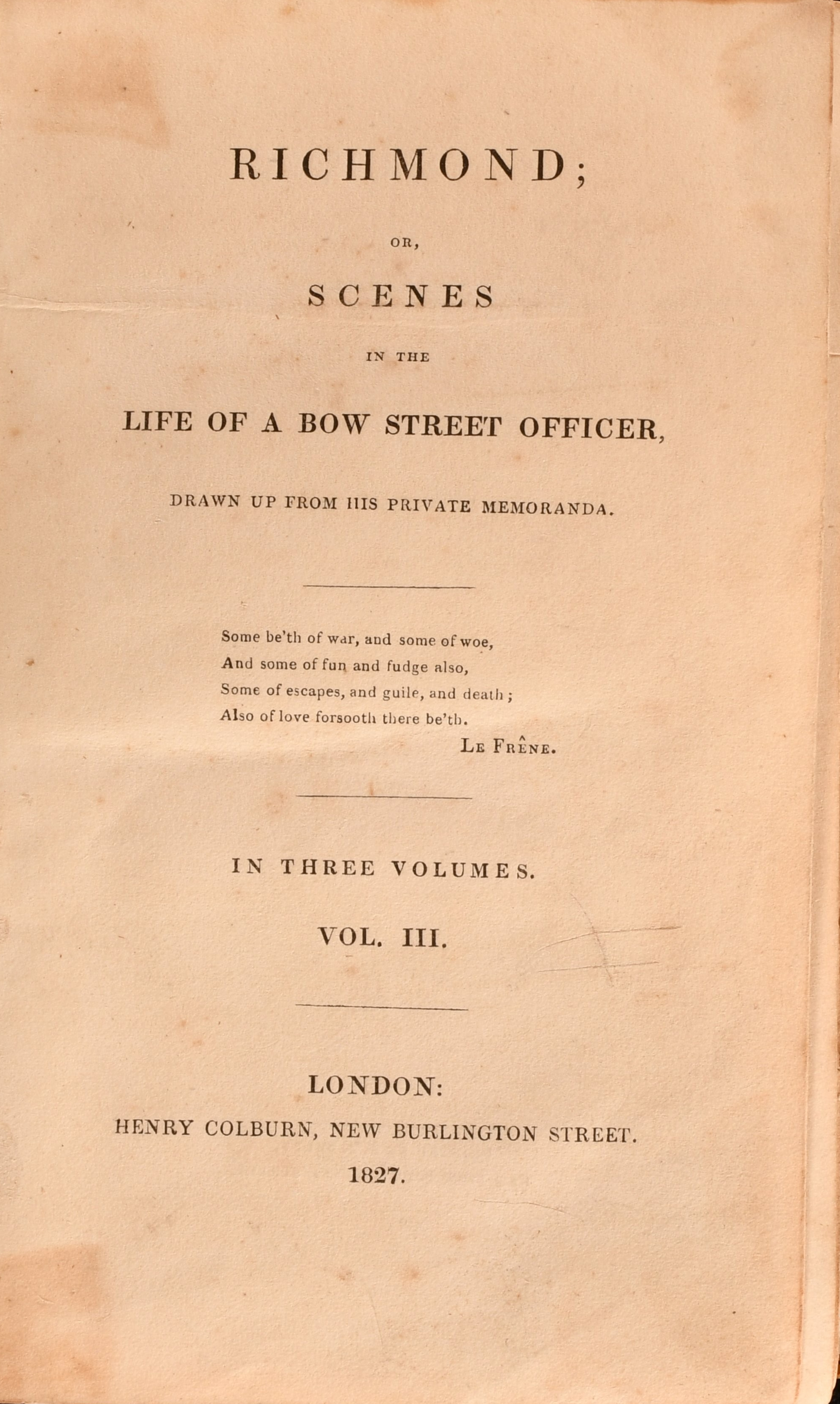
- Author: Thomas Skinner Surr (or Thomas Gaspey)
- Language: English
- Genre: Crime
- Publisher: Henry Colburn
- Publication date: 1827
- Publication place: United Kingdom
- Media type: Print

Richmond, or, Scenes in the Life of a Bow Street Officer is an 1827 crime novel published anonymously and generally attributed to Thomas Gaspey. Thomas Skinner Surr has also been credited as the author. It was originally published in three volumes by Henry Colburn of New Burlington Street. It blended a depiction of the crime world of the Regency era with the fashionable silver fork novel, also functioning as an adventure novel. The protagonist Tom Richmond, a picaresque figure, joins the Bow Street Runners after a misspent youth. It forms a bridge been early-eighteenth-century crime novels such as Moll Flanders and Colonel Jack with the future development of the full detective novel.

It was published shortly before the creation of the Metropolitan Police by Robert Peel. It was part of the group of Newgate novels that lasted into the early Victorian era.

== Bibliography ==
- Garside, Peter & O'Brien, Karen Elisabeth. English and British Fiction, 1750–1820. Oxford University Press, 2015.
- Kucich, John & Taylor, Jenny Bourne (ed.) The Oxford History of the Novel in English: Volume 3: The Nineteenth-Century Novel 1820-1880. OUP Oxford, 2012.
- Moon, Jina. Domestic Violence in Victorian and Edwardian Fiction. Cambridge Scholars Publishing, 2016.
- Hollingsworth, Keith. "The Newgate Novel, 1830-1847". Bulwer, Ainsworth, Dickens & Thackeray. N.p., Bonhopai Books, 2025.
- Worthington, Heather. "The Rise of the Detective in Early Nineteenth-Century Popular Fiction". United Kingdom, Palgrave Macmillan UK, 2005.
- Flint, Kate. "The Cambridge History of Victorian Literature". N.p., Cambridge University Press, 2012.
- Parrinder, Patrick. "The Oxford History of the Novel in English". Italy, Oxford University Press, 2011.
- Hoeveler, Diane; Burwick, Frederick; Goslee, Nancy Moore. "The Encyclopedia of Romantic Literature, 3 Volume Set". United Kingdom, Wiley, 2012.
