= The Lollards =

1822 novel

- Author: Thomas Gaspey
- Language: English
- Genre: Historical
- Publisher: Longman, Hurst, Rees and Orme
- Publication date: 1822
- Publication place: United Kingdom
- Media type: Print

The Lollards is an 1822 historical novel by the British writer Thomas Gaspey. It was first released in three volumes by the London publishing house Longman. It focuses on the Lollards, a proto-Protestant movement of the fifteenth century, and draws inspiration and style from the popular historical novels of Walter Scott. It also focuses on the invention of the printing press and makes reference to the contemporary Trial of Queen Caroline.

== Bibliography ==
- Burstein, Miriam Elizabeth. Victorian Reformations: Historical Fiction and Religious Controversy, 1820-1904. University of Notre Dame Press,2013.
- Burwick, Frederick Goslee, Nancy Moore & Hoeveler Diane Long . The Encyclopedia of Romantic Literature. John Wiley & Sons, 2012.
- Garside, Peter, Raven, James & Schöwerling, Rainer. The English Novel, 1770-1829. Oxford University Press, 2000.
