= Thomas Gaspey =

English novelist and journalist

- Born: 31 March 1788; Hoxton, Middlesex, England
- Died: 8 December 1871 (aged 83); Shooter's Hill, Kent, England
- Spouse: Anne Camp
- Children: William Gaspey, Thomas W. Gaspey

Thomas Gaspey (31 March 1788 – 8 December 1871) was an English novelist and journalist. In his writing, he dealt mostly with historical fiction, and some of his works are considered early examples of the Newgate novel style which became popular in the 19th century.

Gaspey was born in Hoxton as the son of William Gaspey, a lieutenant in the navy. His older brother, who was ten years his senior and shared his father's name, later became a writer. While a youth he wrote verses for yearly pocket-books, and when about twenty contributed to Literary Recreations, a monthly publication, edited by Eugenius Roche of the Morning Post. Soon afterwards he was engaged as parliamentary reporter on the Morning Post, contributing also dramatic reviews, political parodies, and reports of trials for treason. In this paper he wrote an Elegy on the Marquis of Anglesey's Leg, a jeu d'esprit which has been persistently attributed to Canning. On the Morning Post he was employed sixteen years, then for three or four years on the Courier, a government paper, as sub-editor. In 1828 he bought a share in The Sunday Times, the tone of which paper he raised as a literary and dramatic organ, Horace Smith, the Rev. T. Dale, Alfred Crowquill, E. L. Blanchard, Gilbert à Beckett, and others contributing.

His Richmond (1827) and The History of George Godfrey (1828) are considered as early examples of the Newgate novel. In 1836 he released The Self-Condemned a historical novel set in Elizabethan Ireland.

He was for many years the senior member of the council of the Literary Fund. He was considered an excellent mimic. The last twenty years of his life were spent quietly on his property at Shooter's Hill, Kent, where he died on 8 December 1871, aged 83, and was buried at Plumstead, Kent.

He married Anne Camp in 1810 or 1811, and she died on 22 January 1883. His son, Thomas W. Gaspey, Ph.D., of Heidelberg, who died on 22 December 1871, was author of works on the Rhine and Heidelberg, and of several linguistic handbooks. Another son, William Gaspey (born at Westminster 20 June 1812, died at 17 St. Ann's Road, North Brixton, 19 July 1888), was a prolific writer in prose and verse.

== Notable works ==
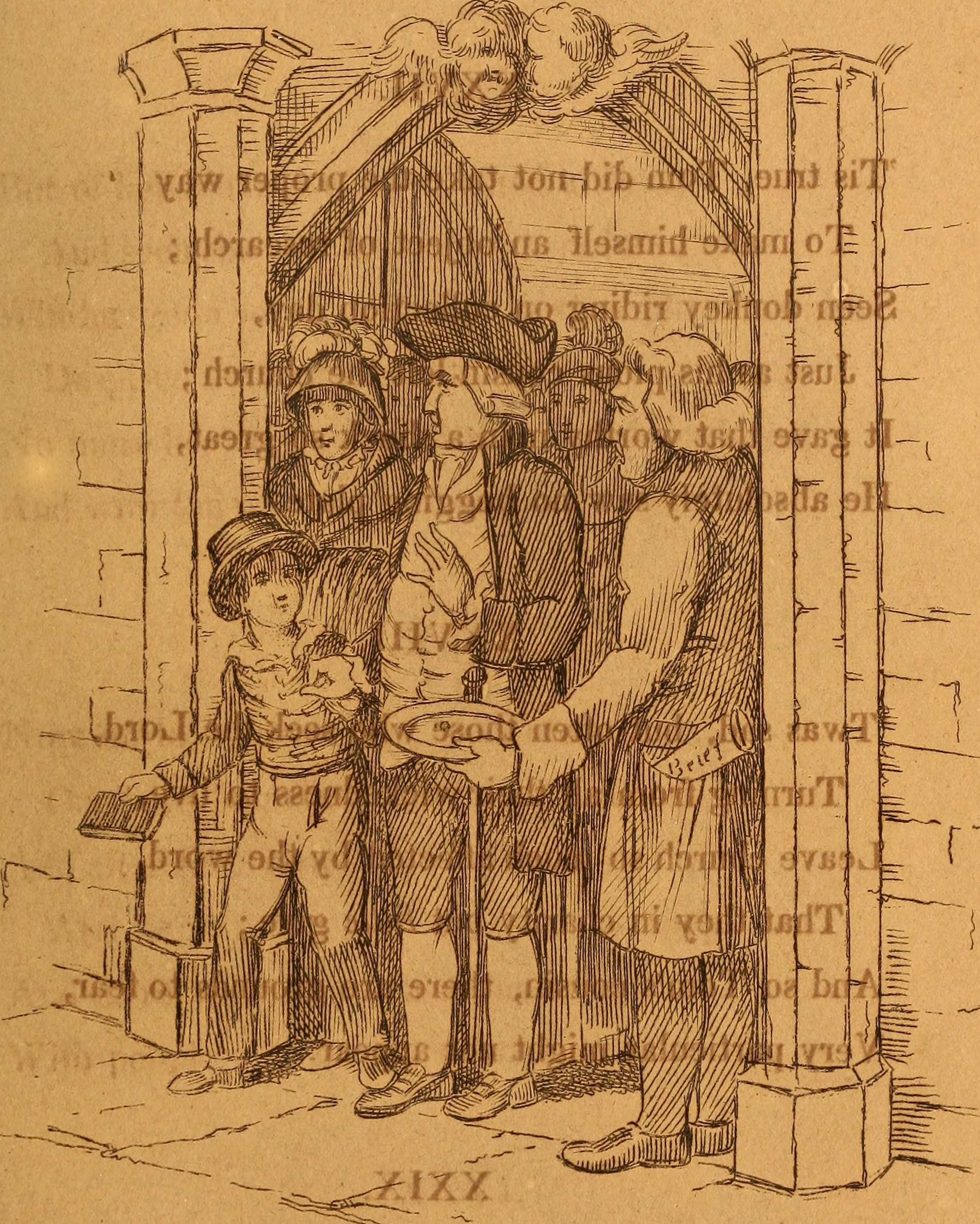
Takings, or the Life of a Collegian

- The Mystery, 1820.
- Takings, or the Life of a Collegian, with 26 Etchings by Richard Dagley, 1821, 8vo.
- Calthorpe, a novel, 1821, 3 vols.
- The Lollards, 1822, 3 vols.
- Other Times, or the Monks of Leadenhall, 1823, 3 vols.
- The Witch-Finder, 1824, 3 vols.
- Richmond, 1827, 3 vols.
- The History of George Godfrey, 1828, 3 vols.
- The Self-Condemned, 1836, 3 vols.
- Many-Coloured Life, 1842.
- The Pictorial History of France, 1843, written in conjunction with G. M. Bussey.
- The Life and Times of the Good Lord Cobham, 1843, 2 vols. 12mo.
- The Dream of Human Life, 1849–52, 2 vols. unfinished.
- The History of England from George III to 1859, 1852–9, 4 vols.
- The History of Smithfield, 1852.
- The Political Life of Wellington, vol. iii. 1853, 4to.

Media offices
Preceded by Clarkson	Editor of The Sunday Times; 1828–1835	Succeeded by Unknown
