= 1810 in poetry =

List of years in poetry	(table)
- … 1800; 1801; 1802; 1803; 1804; 1805; 1806; 1807; 1808; 1809; 1810; 1811; 1812; 1813; 1814; 1815; 1816; 1817; 1818; 1819; 1820 …
- In literature 1807 1808 1809 1810 1811 1812 1813
- Art; Archaeology; Architecture; Literature; Music; Philosophy; Science; +...

Nationality words link to articles with information on the nation's poetry or literature (for instance, Irish or France).

== Events ==
- April 10 – Percy Bysshe Shelley matriculates at University College, Oxford. In September, he publishes through J. J. Stockdale in London Original Poetry by Victor and Cazire co-written with his sister Elizabeth before he came up to Oxford, but withdrawn due to plagiarism of one poem; and in November he and his friend Thomas Jefferson Hogg publish the burlesque Posthumous Fragments of Margaret Nicholson; Being Poems found amongst the Papers of that Noted Female who attempted the Life of the King in 1786 "Edited by John Fitzvictor" in Oxford. Two Gothic novellas by him are also published anonymously this year in London.

== Works published ==
=== United Kingdom ===
- Lucy Aikin, Epistles on Women
- Sir Alexander Boswell, writing under the pen name "Simon Gray", Edinburgh; or, The Ancient Royalty
- Lord Byron, "The Maid of Athens"
- George Crabbe, The Borough in 24 epistles, including one on "Peter Grimes", a poem based on Aldeburgh
- Ebenezer Elliott, Night
- Mary Elliott, The Mice and the Pic Nic, published anonymously "by a Looking-glass Maker"; for children
- Gammer Gurton, Garland or the Nursery Parnassus, including "Little Bo-peep has lost her sheep"
- Charles Lamb and Mary Lamb, writing together under the pen name "W. F. Mylius", The First Book of Poetry, has 22 items from Poetry for Children (1809), and selections from other authors and a new poem, "A Birth-Day Thought"; 10 editions by 1828, anthology
- Mary Russell Mitford, Poems
- Samuel Rogers, The Voyage of Columbus
- Walter Scott:
  - Editor, English Minstrelsy
  - The Lady of the Lake
  - Poetical Works
- Anna Seward, Poetical Works, edited by Walter Scott
- P. B. Shelley and Elizabeth Shelley (his sister), Original Poetry by Victor and Cazire, published anonymously
- P. B. Shelley and Thomas Jefferson Hogg, Posthumous Fragments of Margaret Nicholson, published anonymously
- William Sotheby, Constance of Castille
- Robert Southey, The Curse of Kehama
- Ann Taylor, Jane Taylor and others, Hymns for Infant Minds

=== Other ===
- William Crafts, The Raciad and Other Occasional Poems, United States
- Theodor Körner, Knospen ("Buds"), Germany

== Births ==
Death years link to the corresponding "[year] in poetry" article:

- May 23 – Margaret Fuller (drowned 1850), American journalist, critic, editor, poet and women's rights activist associated with the American Transcendentalism movement
- June 7 – Friedrich Julius Hammer (died 1862), German poet
- July 17 – Martin Farquhar Tupper (died 1889), English writer, and poet,
- December 11 – Alfred de Musset (died 1857), French dramatist, poet, and novelist

== Deaths ==
Death years link to the corresponding "[year] in poetry" article:

- May 17 – Robert Tannahill (born 1774), Scottish poet known as the "Weaver Poet"
- John Finlay (born 1782), Scottish poet
- Twm o'r Nant, also known as Thomas Edwards, (born 1739), Welsh language dramatist and poet

== See also ==
- Poetry
- List of years in poetry
- List of years in literature
- 19th century in literature
- 19th century in poetry
- Romantic poetry
- Golden Age of Russian Poetry (1800–1850)
- Weimar Classicism period in Germany, commonly considered to have begun in 1788 and to have ended either in 1805, with the death of Friedrich Schiller, or 1832, with the death of Goethe
- List of poets

== Notes ==
- "A Timeline of English Poetry" Web page of the Representative Poetry Online Web site, University of Toronto
