= 1810 in literature =

This article contains information about the literary events and publications of 1810.

== Events ==
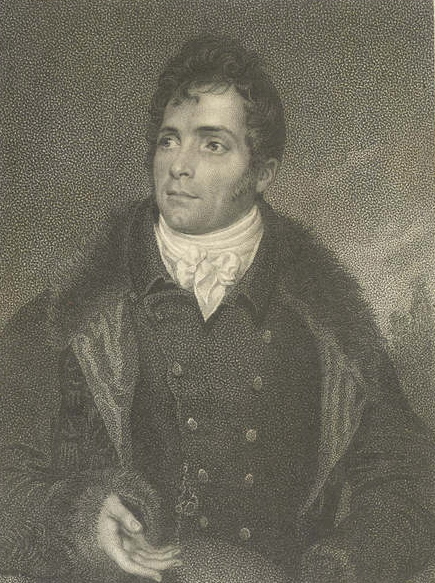
Robert Coates

- February – The eccentric English amateur actor Robert Coates makes his début in a favourite role: Romeo, at the Theatre Royal, Bath.
- April 10 – Percy Bysshe Shelley matriculates at University College, Oxford. His atheistic Gothic novella Zastrozzi: A Romance, written while still a schoolboy at Eton, is published this year under his initials in London. Its successor, St. Irvyne; or, The Rosicrucian: A Romance, is published as "By a Gentleman of the University of Oxford" in December (dated 1811) in London by J. J. Stockdale. In September, Shelley publishes through Stockdale Original Poetry by Victor and Cazire, co-written with his sister Elizabeth before he came up to Oxford, but withdrawn due to plagiarism of one poem. In November he and a friend, Thomas Jefferson Hogg, publish the burlesque Posthumous Fragments of Margaret Nicholson; Being Poems found amongst the Papers of that Noted Female who attempted the Life of the King in 1786 "Edited by John Fitzvictor" in Oxford.
- unknown dates
  - Germaine de Staël's study of Germany De l'Allemagne is published in Paris but suppressed by order of Napoleon.
  - A collection, The British Novelists, with an introductory essay and prefaces by Anna Laetitia Barbauld, appears in 50 volumes in London from F. C. & J. Rivington.

== New books ==
=== Fiction ===
- Johann August Apel and Friedrich Laun – Gespensterbuch
- Catherine Cuthbertson – The Forest of Montalbano
- Sarah Green – The Festival of St. Jago
- Lady Mary Hamilton – The Duc de Popoli
- Ann Hatton – Cambrian Pictures
- Robert Huish – The Mysteries of Ferney Castle
- Emma Parker – A Soldier's Offspring
- Jane Porter – The Scottish Chiefs
- Jan Potocki – The Manuscript Found in Saragossa (Manuscrit trouvé à Saragosse, 2nd version)
- Regina Marie Roche – The Houses of Osma and Almeria; or, Convent of St. Ildefonso: a Tale
- Percy Bysshe Shelley – Zastrozzi
- Louisa Stanhope
  - Di Montranzo
  - The Novice of Corpus Domini
- Catherine George Ward – The Daughter of St Omar
- Heinrich von Kleist – "Das Bettelweib von Locarno" (The Beggarwoman of Locarno, short story)
- Jane West – The Refusal

=== Drama ===
- Joanna Baillie – The Family Legend
- James Sheridan Knowles – Leo; or, The Gipsy
- Adam Oehlenschläger – Axel og Valborg
- Heinrich von Kleist – The Prince of Homburg (Prinz Friedrich von Homburg oder die Schlacht bei Fehrbellin, written)

=== Poetry ===
- George Crabbe – The Borough
- Mary Russell Mitford – Poems
- Walter Scott – The Lady of the Lake
- Percy Bysshe Shelley
  - with Elizabeth Shelley – Original Poetry by Victor and Cazire
  - with Thomas Jefferson Hogg – Posthumous Fragments of Margaret Nicholson

=== Non-fiction ===
- Lucy Aikin – Epistles on Women, Exemplifying their Character and Condition in Various Ages and Nations, with Miscellaneous Poems
- Johann Wolfgang von Goethe – Zur Farbenlehre (Theory of Colours)
- Mirza Abu Taleb Khan (tr. Charles Stewart) – Travels of Mirza Abu Taleb Khan in Asia, Africa and Europe
- Germaine de Staël – De l'Allemagne
- William Wordsworth – Guide to the Lakes

== Births ==
- February 10 – Giulietta Pezzi, Italian novelist, journalist, and poet (died 1878)
- March 10 – Samuel Ferguson, Northern Irish lawyer, poet and artist (died 1886)
- March 28 – Alexandre Herculano, Portuguese writer and historian (died 1877)
- April 8 – Hégésippe Moreau, French writer and poet (died 1838)
- May 10 – E. Cobham Brewer, English lexicographer (died 1897)
- May 11 – Caroline Fox, English diarist (died 1870)
- May 23 – Margaret Fuller American feminist writer (drowned 1850)
- August 6 – William Ticknor, American publisher (died 1864)
- August 15 – Louise Colet, French poet (died 1876)
- August 29 – Juan Bautista Alberdi, Argentinian politician and writer (died 1884)
- August 31 – František Doucha, Czech writer and translator (died 1884)
- September 22 – John Brown, Scottish physician and essayist (died 1882)
- September 29 – Elizabeth Gaskell, English novelist (died 1865)
- December 11 – Alfred de Musset, French poet (died 1857)

== Deaths ==
- February 9 – Richard Chandler, English antiquary (born 1738)
- February 22 – Charles Brockden Brown, American novelist (born 1771; tuberculosis)
- March 14 – Ludwig Timotheus Spittler, German historian (born 1752)
- April 3 – Twm o'r Nant, Welsh-language dramatist and poet (born 1739)
- May 1 – Christoph Meiners, German philosopher (born 1747)
- May 17 – Robert Tannahill, Scottish poet (born 1774)
- May 26 – Catharina Heybeek, Dutch journalist, feminist and editor (born 1764)
- December 15 – Sarah Trimmer, English children's writer and critic (born 1741)

== Sources ==
- Holmes, Richard. Shelley: The Pursuit. London: Weidenfeld and Nicolson, 1974.
