= 1810 in music =

List of years in music	(table)
- … 1800; 1801; 1802; 1803; 1804; 1805; 1806; 1807; 1808; 1809; 1810; 1811; 1812; 1813; 1814; 1815; 1816; 1817; 1818; 1819; 1820 …
- Art; Archaeology; Architecture; Literature; Music; Philosophy; Science; +...

This is a list of music-related events in 1810.

== Events ==
Bagatelle in A minor ("Für Elise")

- April 27 - Ludwig van Beethoven composes one of his most popular compositions, the piano piece Für Elise.
- Friedrich Kuhlau leaves Hamburg for Copenhagen, to avoid conscription into Napoleon's army.
- Work begins on the San Carlo Opera House at Naples.

== Classical music ==
- Ludwig van Beethoven
  - March for Military Band, WoO 20
  - Polonaise for Military Band, WoO 21
  - Ecossaise for Military Band, WoO 22
  - Ecossaise for Military Band, WoO 23
  - Bagatelle No. 25 in A minor for piano, "Für Elise", WoO 59
  - 25 Irish Songs, WoO 152
  - 26 Welsh Songs, WoO 155
  - Egmont, Op. 84, overture and incidental music (first performed, composed 1809)
  - 3 Lieder, Op. 83
  - String Quartet No. 11 in F minor, "Serioso", Op. 95
  - Piano Sonata #26 (Les Adieux)
- Joseph Eybler – Die vier letzen Dinge (oratorio)
- Johann Nepomuk Hummel – Flute Sonata in D major, Op. 50
- Friedrich Kuhlau – Piano Concerto in C major, Op. 7
- Etienne Mehul – Symphony No. 4 in E major
- Ferdinand Ries
  - Violin Concerto No. 1 in E minor, Op. 24
  - Piano Trio, Op. 28
- Bernard Romberg – Trauer-Symphonie, Op .23
- Louis Spohr
  - Clarinet Concerto No.2, Op. 57
  - Violin Concerto No.10, Op. 62
- Christoph Bernard Verspoell – "Menschen, die ihr wart verloren"
- Carl Maria von Weber – Piano Concerto No. 1 in C major, Op. 11

== Opera ==
- Johann Nepomuk Hummel – Mathilde von Guise
- Gioacchino Rossini – La Cambiale di Matrimonio
- Carl Maria von Weber – Silvana

== Publications ==
- Johann Christoph Kuhnau – Die blinden Tonkünstler

== Births ==
- February 3 – Ludwig August Frankl, lyricist and poet (died 1894)
- February 5 – Ole Bull, Norwegian violinist (died 1880)
- February 22 – Frédéric Chopin, composer, pianist (died 1849)
- February 8 – Norbert Burgmüller, composer (died 1836)
- March 15 – Carl Linger (died 1862)
- May 2 – Hans Christian Lumbye, Danish composer (died 1874)
- May 5 – Eugène Cormon, librettist (died 1903)
- May 18 – Francesco Maria Piave, Italian librettist (died 1876)
- May 20 – Sara Augusta Malmborg, singer, pianist and painter (died 1860)
- June 7 – Friedrich Julius Hammer, poet and librettist (died 1862)
- June 8 – Robert Schumann, composer (died 1856)
- June 9 – Otto Nicolai, composer and conductor (died 1849)
- June 17 – Ferdinand Freiligrath, lyricist and poet (died 1876)
- June 19 – Ferdinand David, editor and musician (died 1873)
- August 6 – Giorgio Ronconi, operatic baritone (died 1890)
- August 12 – Alfred Novello, music publisher (died 1896)
- September 22 – Paul Barroilhet, operatic baritone (died 1871)
- October 18 – Giovanni Matteo Mario, operatic tenor (died 1883)
- October 24 – Carl Baermann, composer (died 1885)
- November 7 – Ferenc Erkel, opera composer (died 1893)
- November 16 – Friedrich Wilhelm Kücken, conductor and composer (died 1882)
- December 21 - Ludwig Schuncke, German pianist and composer

== Deaths ==
- January 7 – Joseph Lipavsky, composer
- March 29 – John Garth, composer (born 1721)
- April 8 – Venanzio Rauzzini, castrato singer, composer, pianist and teacher (born 1746)
- July 19 – Joseph Stephenson, composer of West Gallery music (born 1723)
- November 19 – Jean-Georges Noverre, ballet master (born 1727)
- November 27 – Francesco Bianchi, opera composer (born 1752)
- date unknown
  - Margaretha Christina Åbergsson, ballet dancer
  - Anna Davia, opera singer (born 1743)
  - Domenico Fischietti, composer (born 1725)
