= 1862 in poetry =

Mine eyes have seen the glory of the coming of the Lord:
He is trampling out the vintage where the grapes of wrath are stored;
He hath loosed the fateful lightning of His terrible swift sword:
His truth is marching on.

—first stanza of Julia Ward Howe's Battle Hymn of the Republic conceived as both poem and lyrics to a popular tune and first published in February in The Atlantic Monthly

Nationality words link to articles with information on the nation's poetry or literature (for instance, Irish or France).

== Events ==
- February 11 – Dante Gabriel Rossetti, on returning home with Algernon Charles Swinburne after a night on the town, finds his wife, Elizabeth Siddal, dead on the floor from an overdose of laudanum. At her funeral, he places a sheaf of poems (a few years later retrieved) in the coffin.
- December 28 – Walt Whitman moves to Washington, D.C., where he will volunteer in army hospitals.
- Emily Dickinson's year of greatest poetic productivity.

== Works published in English ==
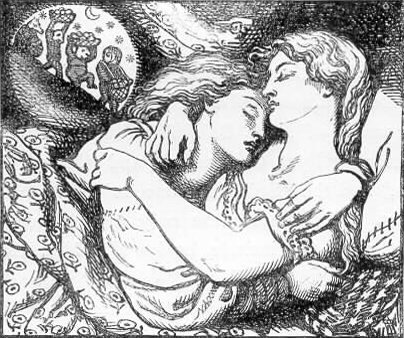
Illustration from the cover of Christina Rossetti's Goblin Market and Other Poems, by her brother Dante Gabriel Rossetti

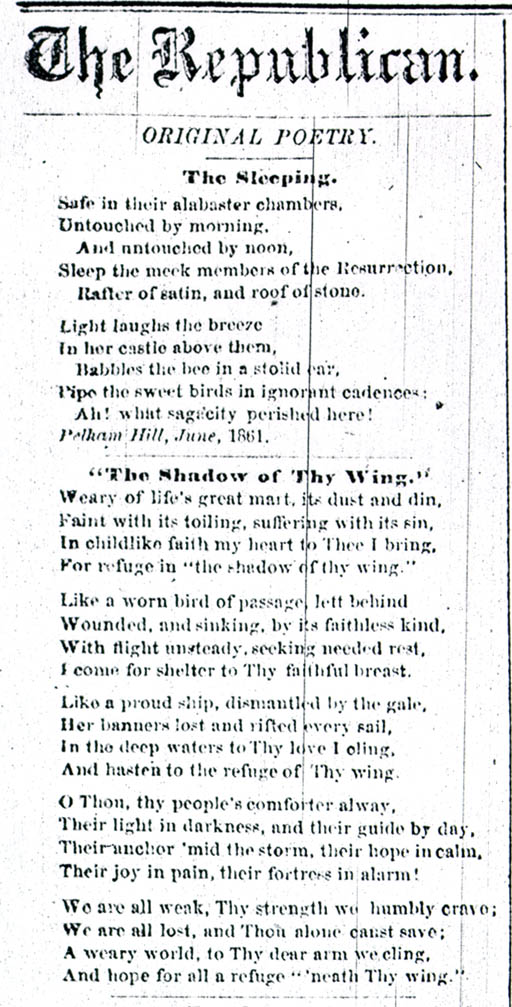
Emily Dickinson's "Safe in their Alabaster Chambers –," entitled "The Sleeping," as published in the Springfield Republican this year, one of the few of her poems published in her lifetime

=== United Kingdom ===
- Matthew Arnold, On Translating Homer: Last Words, a reply to F. W. Newman's Homeric Translation in Theory and Practice 1861, itself a reply to Arnold's On Translating Homer, published that year
- William Barnes, Poems of Rural Life in the Dorset Dialect: Third Collection (see also 1844, 1869, 1868)
- Elizabeth Barrett Browning, Last Poems, edition prepared by her husband, Robert Browning; posthumously published
- Charles Stuart Calverley, published anonymously, Verses and Translations
- A. H. Clough, Last Poems, published posthumously with a memoir by F. T. Palgrave
- Thomas De Quincey, Recollections of the Lakes and the Lake Poets, first publication of the author's series of biographical essays on the Lake Poets, including William Wordsworth, Samuel Taylor Coleridge and Robert Southey (originally published separately in Tait's Edinburgh Magazine in 1834, 1835, 1839 and 1840; see also Selections Grave and Gay 1854, which includes some of the essays)
- Charles Hindley, writing as Mother Shipton, Mother Shipton's Prophecy, dated 1448
- George Meredith, Modern Love and Poems of the English Roadside
- Coventry Patmore, Victories of Love
- Adelaide A. Procter, A Chaplet of Verses, illustrated by Richard Doyle
- Christina Rossetti, Goblin Market and Other Poems (see also Poems 1890)
- Joseph Skipsey, Poems, Songs and Ballads

=== United States ===
- Oliver Wendell Holmes:
  - Songs in Many Keys
  - The Poems of Oliver Wendell Holmes
- Julia Ward Howe, "The Battle Hymn of the Republic", published in The Atlantic Monthly, February
- William Ross Wallace, The Liberty Bell
- John Greenleaf Whittier, The Furnace Blast

=== Other in English ===
- Charles Harpur, A Poet's Home, verse pamphlet, Australia
- Henry Kendall, Poems and Songs, Australia

== Works published in other languages ==
- Aleardo Aleardi, Canto politico ("Political Songs"), Italy
- Charles Baudelaire, Petits poèmes en prose, France
- Dalpatram, editor, Kavhadohan, an anthology of Gujarati-language poetry (India)
- Leconte de Lisle, Poèmes barbares, France
- Henrik Ibsen, Terje Vigen, Norway

== Births ==
Death years link to the corresponding "[year] in poetry" article:

- January 10 – Hoshino Tenchi 星野天知 (died 1950), Japanese Meiji period poet and martial arts master; a co-founder of Bungakukai literary magazine; 8th Grand Master and a teacher of the Yagyu Shinkage-ryu martial-arts school (surname: Hoshino)
- January 12 – Edith Emma Cooper, half of "Michael Field" (died 1913), English
- January 24 – Edith Wharton (died 1937), American fiction writer
- c. January 28 – Ella Rhoads Higginson (died 1940), American
- February 17 – Mori Ōgai 森 鷗外 / 森 鴎外 (died 1922) Japanese physician, translator, novelist and poet (surname: Mori)
- March 2 – John Jay Chapman (died 1923), American writer
- April 24 – A. C. Benson (died 1925), English
- May 22 – John Kendrick Bangs (died 1922), American
- June 6 – Sir Henry Newbolt (died 1938), English
- June 18 – Carolyn Wells (died 1942), American novelist and poet
- August 2 – Duncan Campbell Scott (died 1947), Canadian
- September 28 – W. T. Goodge (died 1909), Australian
- October 29 – John Bernard O'Hara (died 1927), Australian
- November 4 – Jean Blewett (died 1934), Canadian
- November 5 – Thomas William Heney (died 1928), Australian

== Deaths ==
Birth years link to the corresponding "[year] in poetry" article:

- February 11 – Elizabeth Siddal (born 1829), English artist, artist's model and poet, wife of Dante Gabriel Rossetti; from an opium overdose
- February 14 – Emily Rebecca Page (born 1834), American poet and editor
- February 21 – Justinus Kerner (born 1786), German poet of the Swabian school and physician
- February 24 – Bernhard Severin Ingemann (born 1789), Danish poet, playwright and historical novelist
- March 13 – Roderick Flanagan (born 1828), Australian
- May 6 – Henry David Thoreau (born 1817), American author, poet, naturalist, tax resister, development critic, surveyor, historian, philosopher and leading transcendentalist; from tuberculosis
- July 5 – Charles Whitehead (born 1804), English poet, novelist and playwright
- August 23 – Friedrich Julius Hammer (born 1810), German poet
- date not known – Gopala Krishna Pattanayak (born 1785), Indian, Oriya-language poet

== See also ==
- 19th century in poetry
- 19th century in literature
- List of years in poetry
- List of years in literature
- Victorian literature
- French literature of the 19th century
- Poetry
