= Die vier letzten Dinge =

Die vier letzten Dinge is an oratorio in three parts by the composer Joseph Eybler. The three parts depict the end of the world, resurrection of the dead, and redemption of the blessed. The oratorio is about the Four Last Things of man, which are Death, Judgement, Heaven, and Hell. The work is catalogued as HV 137. The work premiered on 15 April 1810 and was commissioned by Emperor Francis I for empress Maria Ludovika. It is scored for flutes, oboes, clarinets, bassoons, contrabassoon, horns, trombones, trumpets and timpani, fortepiano, and strings.

== Discography ==
Die vier letzten Dinge was recorded by the Rheinische Kantorei and the Kleine Konzert under Hermann Max with soloists Elisabeth Scholl, Peter Kooy, and Markus Schäfer on CPO in 2005.
