= 1739 in poetry =

This article covers 1739 in poetry. Nationality words link to articles with information on the nation's poetry or literature (for instance, Irish or France).

== Works published ==
- Samuel Boyse, Deity
- Moses Browne, Poems on Various Subjects
- Mary Collier, The Woman's Labour: An epistle to Mr. Stephen Duck
- Robert Nugent, 1st Earl Nugent, Irish poet, published in the United Kingdom:
  - An Epistle to the Right Honourable, Sir Robert Walpole, attributed to Nugent
  - An Ode on Mr. Pulteney, published anonymously
  - An Ode to His Royal Highness on His Birthday, published anonymously
  - Odes and Epistles, published anonymously
- Laetitia Pilkington, The Statues; or, The Trial of Constancy, published anonymously
- Elizabeth Rowe, Miscellaneous Works in Prose and Verse, including "The History of Joseph", English, Colonial America, posthumously published
- Jonathan Swift, Verses on the Death of Dr. Swift, Written by Himself, revised and expanded version of The Life and Genuine Character of Doctor Swift 1731
- John Wesley and Charles Wesley, Hymns and Sacred Poems (see also A Collection of Psalms and Hymns 1741)
- Paul Whitehead, Manners: A Satire

== Births ==
Death years link to the corresponding "[year] in poetry" article:

- March 24 – Christian Friedrich Daniel Schubart (died 1791), German poet, organist, composer and journalist
- Joseph Friedrich Engelschall (died 1797), German
- Twm o'r Nant, also known as Thomas Edwards, (died 1810), Welsh language dramatist and poet
- Edward Thompson

== Deaths ==
Birth years link to the corresponding "[year] in poetry" article:

- Hildebrand Jacob

== See also ==
- Poetry
- List of years in poetry
- List of years in literature
- 18th century in poetry
- 18th century in literature
- Augustan poetry
- Scriblerus Club

== Notes ==
- "A Timeline of English Poetry" Web page of the Representative Poetry Online Web site, University of Toronto
