= Margaret Nicholson =

Failed assassin of King George III of Great Britain

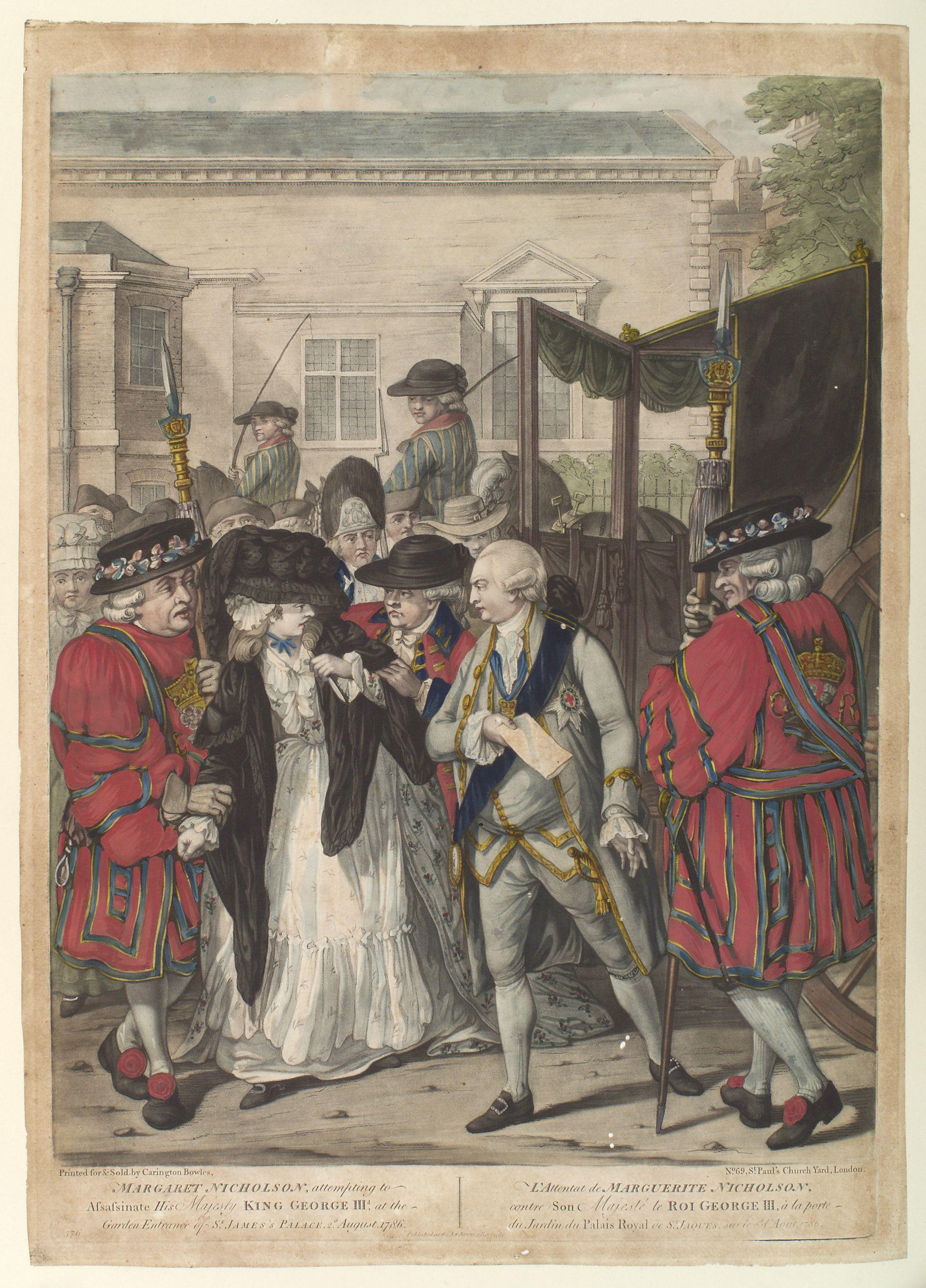
Margaret Nicholson's attack on George III, as depicted in a contemporary print

Margaret Nicholson (c. 1750 – 14 May 1828) was an Englishwoman who assaulted King George III in 1786. Her futile and somewhat half-hearted attempt on the King's life became famous and was featured in one of Percy Bysshe Shelley's first works: Posthumous Fragments of Margaret Nicholson, published in 1810.

== Life ==
Nicholson was born in Stockton-on-Tees in County Durham to a barber called George Nicholson. In the mid-1760s, at the age of 12, she was found a place as a maid, and from then worked as a servant in various notable households, including those of Sir John Sebright and Lord Coventry. She showed no signs of mental illness. Before 1783, she was dismissed from her employment after a love affair with a fellow servant, and she seemed to fall on hard times. Years later, her brother would report that it was during this period that she fell ill, falling into bouts of laughter at night. Her lover left her, and she supported herself through needlework, lodging in a house in Wigmore Street. She was described as "below the middle size, and of a very swarthy complexion".

From April 1786 on to her attempt on the King’s life in August, she petitioned the king more than 20 times. In one such petition, she demanded a property settlement and a decent marriage, possibly to the king himself.

=== Attack on the King ===
On 2 August 1786, Nicholson approached the King as he alighted from a carriage at St. James's Palace on the pretext of presenting him with a petition, which was actually a blank piece of paper. As he received the supposed petition, she made two lunges at his chest with an ivory-handled dessert knife concealed in the paper before she was brought under control. His response is recorded in a page’s account. George, apparently fearing that she would be unjustly handled for such a pitiful attack, reportedly commanded: "The poor creature is mad; do not hurt her, she has not hurt me."

The King’s reaction prompted a wave of public support for and intrigue towards her condition; it likely informed the decision by the Privy Council not to have her tried for high treason, but rather under the Vagrancy Act of 1744. Waxworks and paintings were made of Nicholson and the event, and it was reported that her house was stormed upon by inquisitive members of the public.

A search of her lodgings yielded a series of bizarre and clearly delusional letters in which she claimed to be the rightful heir to the throne. The newspapers assumed that Nicholson's insanity was brought on by melancholia over her lover's desertion. She was examined in the chamber of the Board of Green Cloth by Prime Minister and Chancellor of the Exchequer William Pitt the Younger, Home Secretary Lord Sydney, Foreign Secretary Lord Carmarthen, Sir Francis Drake, and Mr. Justice Addington. It was discovered that in July she had sent petitions to the King regarding her claim to the throne.

In her reply to questions from Addington, she claimed to be a virgin, but also claimed to be the mother of Lords Mansfield and Loughborough, both of whom were older than she was. Her landlord, a stationer called Jonathan Fiske, stated that she was industrious and sober, and earned her living at needlework, making mantuas. She denied wanting to assassinate the King, and said she only wanted to “get his attention.” The noted physician Dr John Munro, who was already well known for his testimony in the murder trial of Laurence Shirley, 4th Earl Ferrers, certified her insane, stating he had “never seen a person more disordered”, though this is questioned as potentially serving as a means of justifying her detention. She was committed to the asylum he directed, Bethlem Royal Hospital, for life under the Vagrancy Act of 1744 on the order of the Home Secretary, Lord Sydney. Members of the nobility could pay to spectate her imprisonment at the hospital, and she was subjected to violent and irrational treatment methods, including doctors confining her to her room in chains for nearly 4 years. She died there 42 years later, despite seemingly having recovered by the 1790s.

== Legacy ==
George enjoyed a boost in popularity after the attack, and received congratulatory messages from all over the kingdom. His calm forbearance and progressive attitude to the insane were praised. He wrote that after "the interposition of Providence in the late attempt on my life by a poor insane woman" he "had every reason to be satisfied with the impression it has awakened in this country". Nevertheless, as a result of the attack, the security surrounding the King was increased from 4 guards to 11.

Popular depictions of Nicholson ranged from mad old spinster to romanticised heroine. In 1810, Percy Bysshe Shelley and Thomas Jefferson Hogg wrote and published a slim volume of burlesque poetry named after her, Posthumous Fragments of Margaret Nicholson. Rather than use their own names, the book pretended to be poems of Nicholson's own composition, "edited by her nephew, John FitzVictor" and published after her death. In fact, she was still alive and living in Bethlem Hospital.

Nicholson's incarceration in Bethlem Hospital was extrajudicial, and George's political opponents depicted it as the act of a tyrant bypassing the rule of law. It was also opposed by hard-line conservatives, who thought it overly generous. However, on the whole it was seen as an act of humane kindness on George's part because a trial for treason was substituted with a hospital placement. Despite this fact, her condition was largely ignored by the government, media, and public in the aftermath of her committal, and she is thought to have been abandoned by the state to advance political interests. In succeeding years, the introduction of "not guilty by reason of insanity", the Criminal Lunatics Act 1800, and the trial of another insane assailant, James Hadfield, formalised the treatment in Britain of insane persons accused of crimes.

Her attack on George III is depicted in an early scene of the film The Madness of King George (1994), where she was played by Janine Duvitski.

== See also ==
- John Frith (assailant)
