= John Frith (assailant) =

Failed assassin of King George III of Great Britain

John Frith (b. c. 1760 – fl. 1791) was an Englishman who believed himself to be St Paul.

On 21 January 1790, Frith threw a stone at King George III's coach as it travelled to the State Opening of Parliament. As in an earlier case of assault against the King, that of Margaret Nicholson, Frith had sent multiple petitions to Parliament regarding his constitutional rights. He believed that he had been illegally deprived of his livelihood as a lieutenant in the army after he had been forcibly retired by Jeffrey Amherst, who had "fabricated evidence of insanity against him". Frith claimed that Amherst had sent "supernatural agents" to whisper in his ear. As his petitions were ignored, Frith may have lobbed the stone in an attempt to gain the attention that he felt he deserved.

During questioning, Frith denied wanting to harm the King, and claimed he was trying to draw attention to his cause. However, he also claimed that people saw him as a messiah, and that when the moon was in the south its effects were so strong that he was unable to sleep near heavy buildings. He was arraigned at Newgate Prison, but after attempting to explain that his "Christ-like powers" had helped him to defeat the voices in his ear, he was declared unfit to plead by reason of insanity. He was discharged on the condition that he be committed to an asylum, but he remained at Newgate suffering occasional "fits of rage" until December 1791, when he was moved to Bethlem Royal Hospital.

As in the earlier Nicholson case, the King was portrayed as treating an insane person accused of a crime with forgiveness and forbearance.
