= John Finlay (poet) =

Scottish poet

- Born: 1782
- Died: 1810 (aged 27–28)

John Finlay (1782–1810) was a Scottish poet.

== Biography ==
Finlay was born in Glasgow in December 1782. He was educated in one of the academies at Glasgow, and at the age of fourteen entered the university, where he had as a classmate John Wilson (alias 'Christopher North'), who states that he was distinguished "above most of his contemporaries".

The prospect of obtaining a situation in one of the public offices led him to visit London in 1807, and while there he contributed to the magazines some articles on antiquarian subjects. Not finding suitable employment he returned to Glasgow in 1808.

He began to collect materials for a continuation of Warton's History of Poetry, but in 1810 he left Glasgow to visit Professor Wilson at Ellerlay, Westmoreland; on the way he fell ill at Moffat, and died there on 8 December.

== Works ==
While only nineteen, and still at the university, Finlay published Wallace, or the Vale of Ellerslie, and other Poems in 1802, dedicated to Mrs. Dunlop of Dunlop, the friend of Robert Burns, a second edition with some additions appearing in 1804, and a third in 1817. Professor Wilson describes it as displaying "a wonderful power of versification", and possessing "both the merits and defects which we look for in the early compositions of true genius".

In 1808 Finlay published Scottish Historical and Romantic Ballads, chiefly ancient, with Explanatory Notes and a Glossary, As the title indicates, the majority of the ballads were not his own composition, but Sir Walter Scott nevertheless wrote of the book: "The beauty of some imitations of the old Scottish ballads, with the good sense, learning, and modesty of the preliminary dissertations, must make all admirers of ancient lore regret the early loss of this accomplished young man".

Finlay also published an edition of Robert Blair's The Grave, wrote a life of Miguel de Cervantes, and superintended an edition of Adam Smith's Wealth of Nations.
