= Catherine George Ward =

Catherine Mason
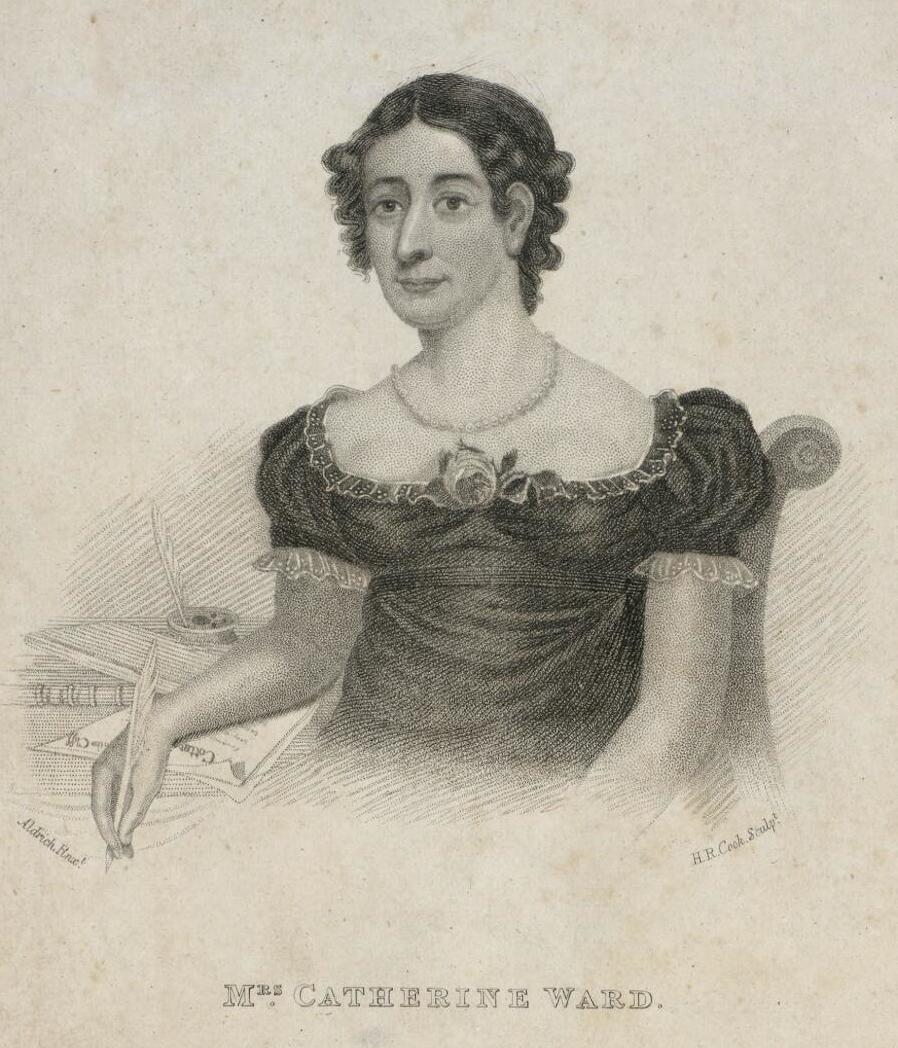
- Born: Catherine George Ward; 1787; Scotland
- Died: Unknown
- Occupation: Writer
- Spouse(s): First husband unknown; second James M Mason

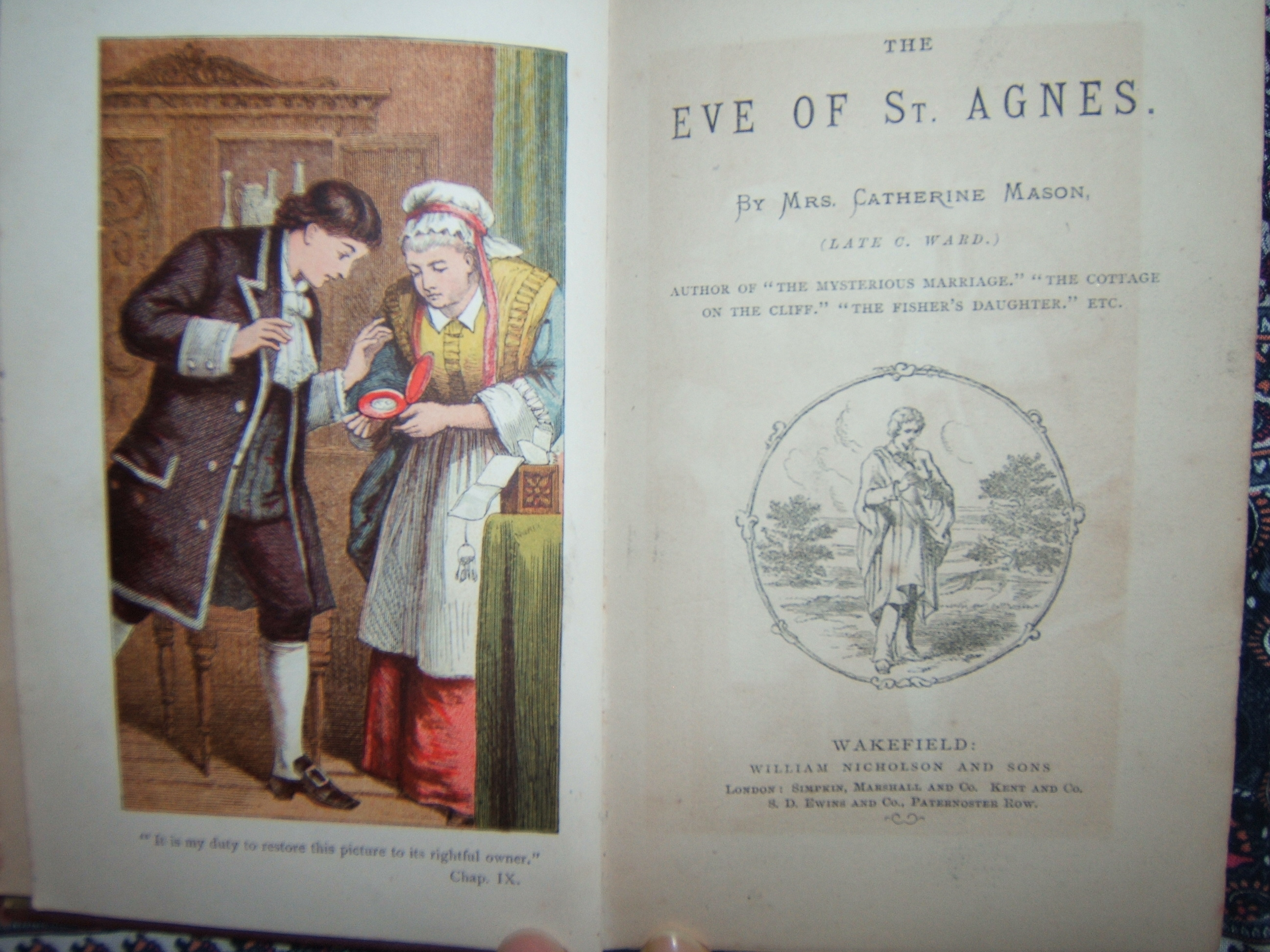
Title page of The Eve of St Agnes (1831)

Catherine Mason (born Catherine George Ward, 1787 – after 1833) was born in Scotland and is most recognised for her literary works of novels, poetry and children's fiction. Some of her most notable works are The Mysterious Marriage, The Rose of Claremont and The Eve of St Agnes. Her story begins in 1810 when Ward settled in London, presumably with her first husband. She is also believed to have had a brief acting career in Edinburgh during her earlier years.

== Biography ==
Ward was born in Scotland in 1787 although her childhood was spent on the Isle of Wight. Details of her parents and siblings are as yet unknown. During her time in Edinburgh she is believed to have acted on the stage for a short period which may have influenced her to later write two operas and a farce. Her first published work was a collection of poems she wrote whilst in Edinburgh in 1805.

By 1810, aged 33, Ward was settled in London and wrote her first novel, The Daughter of St. Omar. Over the 30 years she was writing, Ward published around twenty-one novels and six collections of poetry. One particular novel, The Castle of Villeroy, in 1829 was written under the pseudonym, Ann of Kent. It is her only novel written under a pseudonym.

Despite her extensive writing career, Ward's life was financially difficult. She applied for financial support from the Royal Literary fund five times over the period 1816 and 1832, receiving £35 in total. On 18 June 1824, Ward was detained at the Kings bench prison for her husband's debts that amounted to £70. She was released in August of the same year, around the time she was writing The Mysterious Marriage.

Her death was a quiet affair, likely in Scotland, and the date remains unknown. She faded from the literary world in 1833 after the release of her final novel, Alice Gray.

== Marriage and children ==
Little is known of Ward's first marriage except that it was fraught with financial challenge. On 12 January 1824 her husband, who was bankrupt, died after contracting tuberculosis, leaving Ward to apply for financial support from the Royal Literary fund in order to cover the cost of the funeral. Ward married her second husband, James M Mason, by 1827. He too suffered from tuberculosis and was bankrupt at the time of his death in 1832. Again Ward applied to the Royal Literary fund for help with funeral costs and the necessary travel expenses for her to return to her native Scotland. There was a child born to Ward whose birth date is unknown. We do, however, know that it died around 1816, as in May of that year Ward wrote to the Royal Literary fund, thanking them for aid in burying her child. She had no other known offspring.

== Published works ==
As Catherine George Ward:

- The Daughter of St. Omar (1810)
- My Native Land (1813)
- A Bachelor's Heiress (1814)
- The Son and the Nephew (1814)
- Robertina (1818)
- The Thorn (1819)
- The Mysterious Marriage (1820)
- The Rose of Claremont (1820)
- The Orphan Boy (1821)
- Family Portraits (1822)
- The Cottage on the Cliffs (1823)
- The Mysteries of St. Clair; or, Mariette Mouline (1823)
- The Widow's Choice (1823)
- The First Child (1824)
- The Fisher's Daughter (1824)
- The Forest Girl (1826)
- The Castle of Villeroy or The Bandit Chief (Written under the pseudonym, Ann of Kent) (1827)
- The Knight of the White Banner (1827)

As Mrs. Mason:

- The Eve of St. Agnes (1831)
- Alice Gray: A Domestic Novel (1833)

== Reception ==
Ward was a prolific writer and did publish sequels to some of her works. Family Portraits: The Fisher's Daughter (1812) was the continuation of The Mysterious Marriage (1810) showing that the reading public was interested in her work. The London Literary Gazette described The Eve of St. Agnes as containing "mysteries, love affairs, rewards and punishments, death to one hero, and a wife to the other."

== External sites ==
Corvey Women Writers on the Web author page
