= František Doucha =

Czech priest, writer and translator (1810–1884)

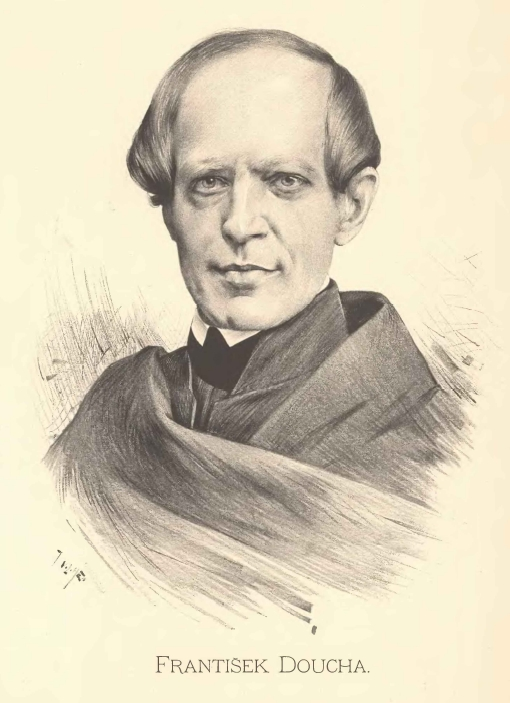
Portrait of Doucha by Jan Vilímek

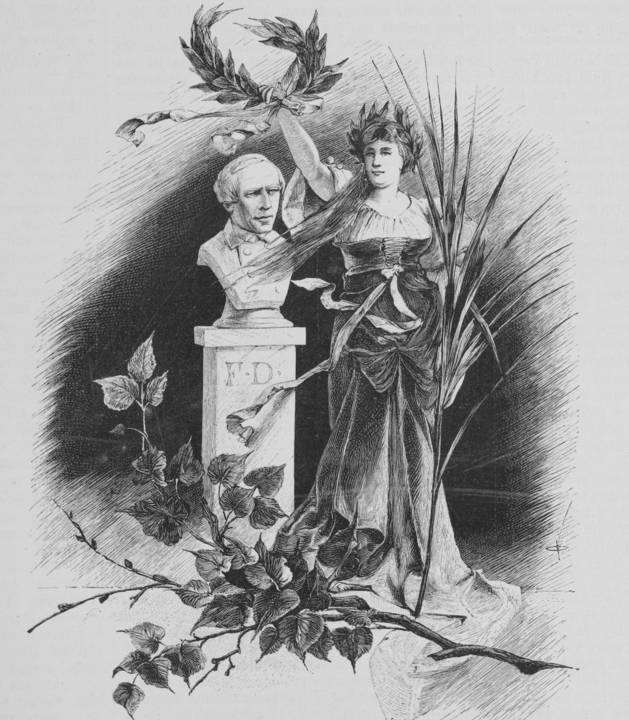
Viktor Oliva: To commemorate František Doucha

Frantisek Doucha (31 August 1810 in Prague-Malá Strana – 3 November 1884 in Prague) was a Czech priest, writer and translator.

Doucha is one of the most famous Czech literary translators. He was among the most prolific translators of the century, translating works from 14 different languages. His name is often associated with many Shakespearian translations into the Czech language. As a writer, he is one of the founders of Czech children's literature.
