= Robert Huish =

English author

Robert Huish (1777 – April 1850) was a prolific English author of history books, novels, and miscellaneous other works.

== Life ==
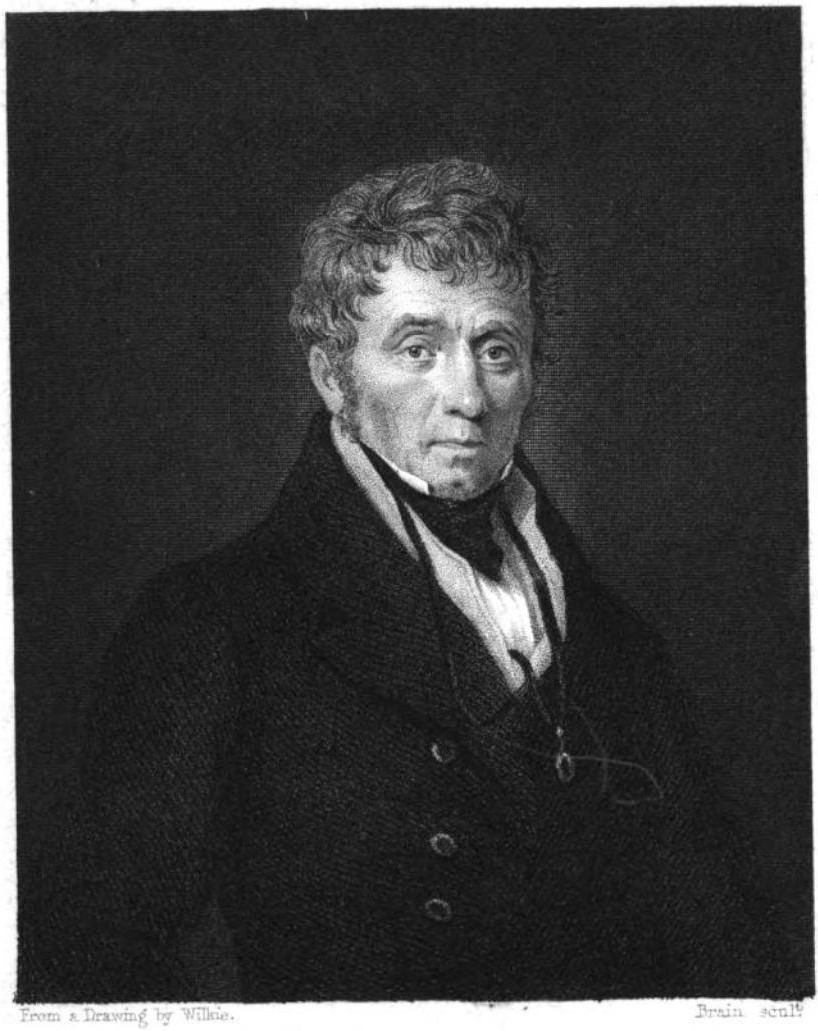
Robert Huish

The son of Mark Huish of Nottingham, he was born there in 1777. He wrote a short treatise on bee-culture, which was afterwards expanded and issued in various forms. His other works are nearly all poor examples of anecdotal, quasi-historical bookmaking; the Quarterly Review spoke of him as an obscure and unscrupulous scribbler. He was prolific, as witnessed by his voluminous compilations during 1835–6. He executed a few translations from the German, and in his later years some novels. Nearly all his books exhibit anti-Tory prejudices. He died in Camberwell in April 1850.

== Works ==
His works comprise:

- A Treatise on the Nature, Economy, and Practical Management of Bees, London, 1815.
- Memoirs of her late Royal Highness Princess Charlotte Augusta, 1818, with a separately issued supplement, 1818.
- The Public and Private Life of George III, 1821.
- An Authentic History of the Coronation of George IV, 1821.
- Memoirs of Caroline, Queen of Great Britain, 1821, 2 vols.
- Authentic Memoir of … Frederick, Duke of York and Albany, 1827.
- Memoirs of George IV, London, 1830, 2 vols.
- The Historical Galleries of Celebrated Men (authentic portraits), 1830; only one volume published.
- The Wonders of the Animal Kingdom, London, 1830.
- The Last Voyage of Captain Sir John Ross … to the Arctic Regions in 1829–33, London, 1835.
- The Travels of Richard and John Lander … into the interior of Africa, 1835 (with a résumé of previous African travel).
- A Narrative of the Voyages of … Captain Beechey to the Pacific and Behring's Straits, London, 1836.
- The History of the Private and Political Life of Henry Hunt, Esq., his Times and Co-temporaries, 1836.
- Memoirs of William Cobbett, Esq., 1836, 2 vols.
- The Memoirs, Private and Political, of Daniel O'Connell, 1836.
- The History of the Life and Reign of William IV, the Reform Monarch of England, 1837.
- The Natural History and General Management of Bees, 1844.
- The Progress of Crime; or, Authentic Memoirs of Marie Manning, 1849.
