= Anna Davia =

Italian opera singer

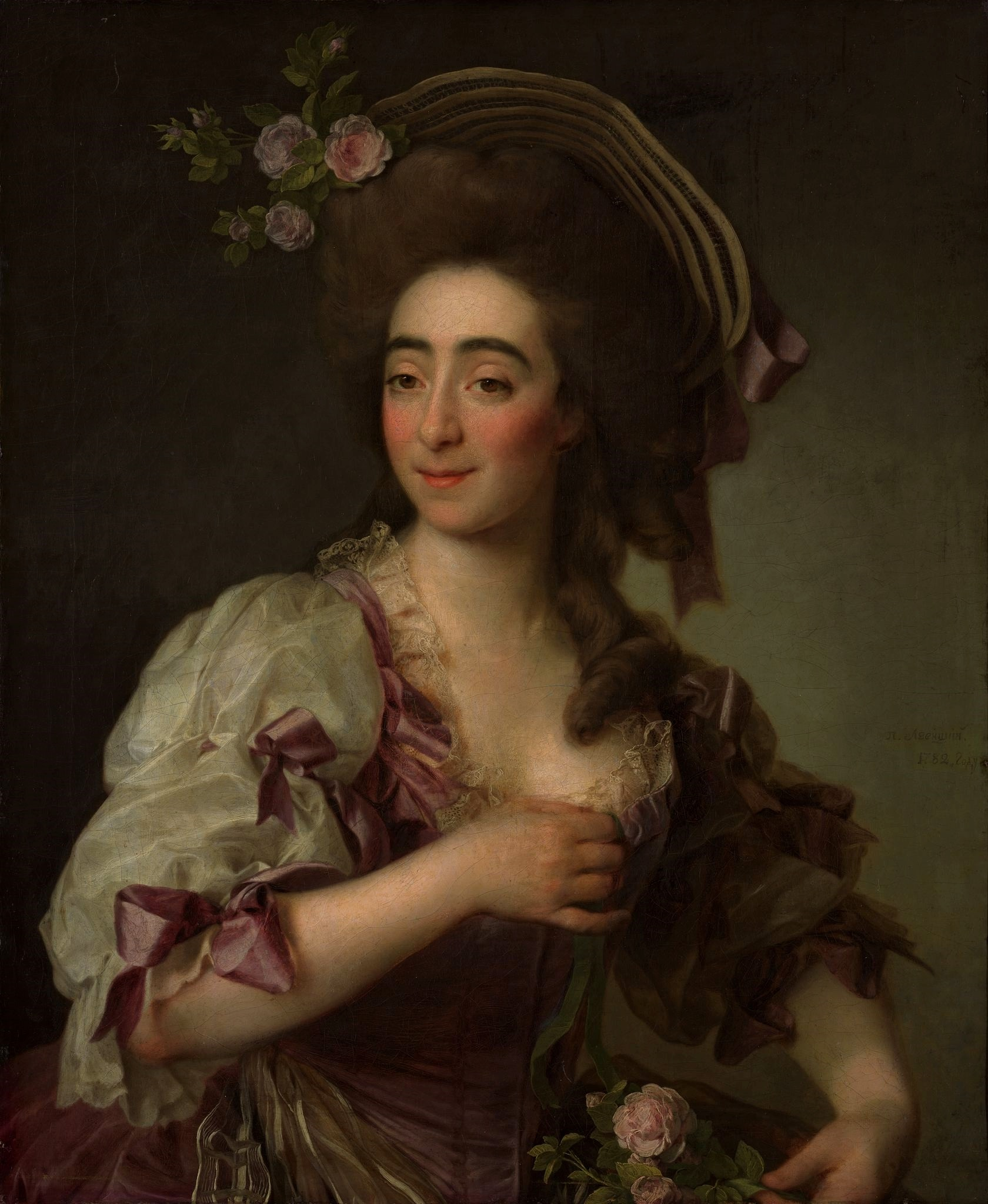

Anna Davia (16 October 1743 – 1810), was an Italian opera singer.

Born to Osvaldo and Maddalena da Via and married to the merchant Giovanni Bernucci in Genua. She became a singer after the bankruptcy of her spouse.

In 1761, she debuted in the Italian Opera in Amsterdam, where she became a star. In 1777, she sang in Warsaw, and between 1779 and 1785, she was a celebrated prima donna in Saint Petersburg in Russia, where she achieved widespread fame and was given a contract worth a salary of 2800 roubles by Catherine the Great.

She left Russia for Italy in 1785 and retired in 1803.
