= Original Poetry by Victor and Cazire =

Poetry written by Percy Bysshe Shelley and his sister Elizabeth

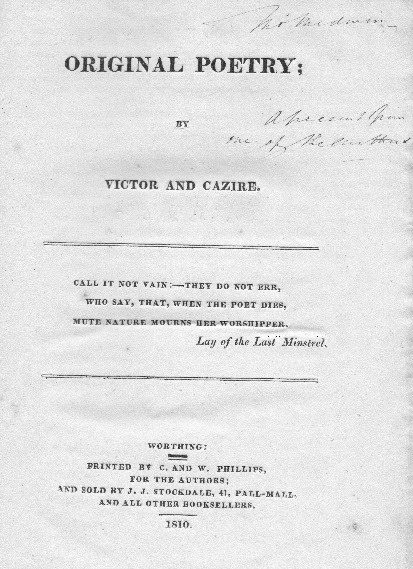
1810 first edition title page, J. J. Stockdale, London.

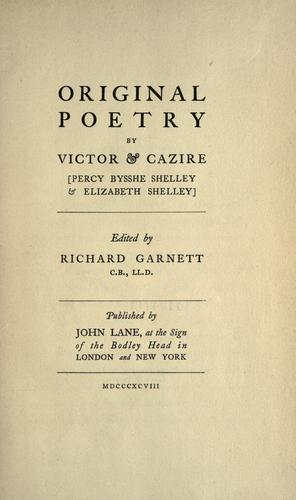
1898 reprint title page, John Lane, London and New York

Original Poetry by Victor and Cazire was a poetry collection written by Percy Bysshe Shelley and his sister Elizabeth which was printed by Charles and William Phillips in Worthing and published by John Joseph Stockdale in September 1810. The work was Shelley's first published volume of poetry. Shelley wrote the poems in collaboration with his sister Elizabeth. The poems were written before Shelley entered the University of Oxford.

The volume consisted of sixteen poems and a fragment of a poem. Shelley wrote eleven of the poems while Elizabeth wrote five. Shelley contributed seven lyrical poems, four Gothic poems, and the political poem "The Irishman's Song". Elizabeth wrote three lyrical poems and two verse epistles. The collection included the early poems "Revenge", "Ghasta, Or, The Avenging Demon!!!", "Song: Sorrow", and "Song: Despair". The epigraph was from the "Lay of the Last Minstrel" by Sir Walter Scott: "Call it not vain:— they do not err, Who say, that, when the poet dies, Mute Nature mourns her worshipper."

Controversy surrounded the work, however, because one of the poems included, "Saint Edmond's Eve", originally appeared in the anonymously published Tales of Terror (1801), attributed to Matthew Gregory Lewis. Shelley told Stockdale that his sister Elizabeth had included the Lewis poem. Shelley apologised and informed Stockdale to suppress the volume. Fourteen hundred and eighty copies had been printed and one hundred copies had been circulated. Fearing a plagiarism lawsuit, Stockdale withdrew the work from publication. Copies of the work became extremely rare and it lapsed into obscurity. Four original copies are known to exist.

In 1859, Richard Garnett was able to substantiate that the volume had been published but was unable to locate an extant copy. The collection was reprinted and revived in 1898 by John Lane in an edition edited by Richard Garnett after a copy of the volume had been found.

== Contents ==
1. Letter ("Here I sit with my paper, my pen and my ink")
2. Letter: To Miss—From Miss –
3. Song ("Cold, cold is the blast when December is howling")
4. Song ("Come ---! Sweet is the hour")
5. Song: Despair
6. Song: Sorrow
7. Song: Hope
8. Song: Translated From the Italian
9. Song: Translated From the German
10. The Irishman's Song
11. Song ("Fierce roars the midnight storm")
12. Song: To – ("Ah! sweet is the moonbeam that sleeps on yon fountain")
13. Song: To – ("Stern, stern is the voice of fate's fearful command")
14. Saint Edmond's Eve
15. Revenge
16. Ghasta Or, The Avenging Demon!!!
17. Fragment, Or The Triumph of Conscience

== Critical reception ==
The volume was advertised in the Morning Chronicle of 18 September, the Morning Post of 19 September, and The Times of 12 October 1810. Reviews appeared in Literary Panorama, The Anti-Jacobin Review, The British Critic, and The Poetical Register. The reviews, which primarily focused on Elizabeth's poems, were negative and highly critical. Literary Panorama dismissed the poems as examples of "nonsensical rhyme". The British Critic review described the volume as "filled up by songs of sentimental nonsense, and very absurd tales of horror." The Poetical Register called the poems "downright scribble" and a "waste of paper", dismissing "all this sort of trash".

In 2015, David Duff wrote that Original Poetry represents "a vital stage in Shelley's literary development, reflecting a fascinating but under-explored phase in the broader culture of Romanticism." The influence and impact of the work endured: "But the literary experiments of 1810 --- an adventure in writing and book-making involving every kind of transgression, textual, political, and legal --- had a formative effect on his work, the traces of which he could never fully erase."

== Influence ==
Original Poetry by Victor and Cazire influenced Frankenstein; or, The Modern Prometheus (1818). In her biography of Mary Shelley, Anne Kostelanetz Mellor noted the influence of the work on the latter novel:

"As William Veeder has most recently reminded us, several dimensions of Victor Frankenstein are modelled directly on Percy Shelley. (6) Victor was Percy Shelley's pen-name for his first publication, Original Poetry; by Victor and Cazire (1810). Victor Frankenstein's family resembles Percy Shelley's: in both, the father is married to a woman young enough to be his daughter; in both the oldest son has a favorite sister (adopted sister, or cousin, in Frankenstein's case) named Elizabeth. Frankenstein's education is based on Percy Shelley's: both were avid students of Albertus Magnus, Paracelsus, Pliny, and Buffon; both were fascinated by alchemy and chemistry; both were excellent linguists, acquiring fluency in Latin, Greek, German, French, English, and Italian. (7)"

The theme of unremitting vengeance is also common to both works. "Revenge" and "Ghasta, Or, The Avenging Demon!!!" rely on the theme of revenge. The Being similarly seeks revenge against Victor Frankenstein. John V. Murphy noted in The Dark Angel: Gothic Elements in Shelley's Works that the revenge motif was a major theme of Shelley's writings: "The idea of an avenging demon is central in Shelley's poetry and, in diverse form, will appear in almost all of the major works." Revenge is the major theme of Zastrozzi (1810), Posthumous Fragments of Margaret Nicholson (1810), and The Cenci (1819).

The language of the two works is also similar. In the poem "Revenge", line 20, the narrator exclaims: "Alone will I glut its all conquering maw." In Frankenstein, the Being expresses a similar sentiment: "I will glut the maw of death."

== See also ==
- 1810 in poetry
