= Posthumous Fragments of Margaret Nicholson =

1810 collection of poetry

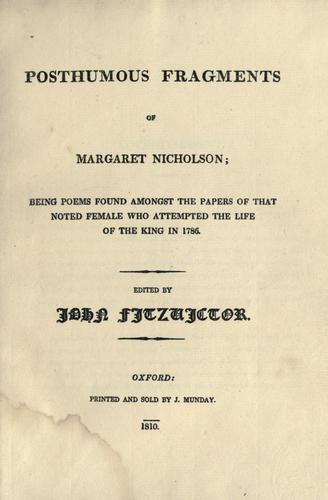
1810 first edition title page, J. Munday, Oxford.

Posthumous Fragments of Margaret Nicholson was a collection of poetry published in November 1810 by Percy Bysshe Shelley and his friend Thomas Jefferson Hogg while they were students at Oxford University. The pamphlet was subtitled: "Being Poems found amongst the Papers of that Noted Female who attempted the Life of the King in 1786. Edited by John Fitzvictor." The pamphlet was published by John Munday and Henry Slatter in Oxford and consisted of fictional fragments that were in the nature of a hoax and prank or burlesque.

The collection was one of the earliest published works of Shelley and one of his earliest political works. The work was reprinted in 1877. Shelley expressed his early political views on government, war, and society.

== Synopsis ==
Shelley and Hogg presented the poems as being written by Margaret Nicholson herself but which were "edited by her nephew, John FitzVictor" and published after her death. John FitzVictor was not a real person but contrived by Shelley and Hogg. In the play on words he was the son of Victor, intended as an allusion to the co-author of Original Poetry by Victor and Cazire, and the nephew of Margaret Nicholson who had located the poetical fragments. "Fitz" is a Norman prefix meaning "son of", derived from the Old French word "fils" and the Latin "filius". So "FitzVictor" was "son of Victor". Moreover, Margaret Nicholson was alive at the time of publication and living in Bethlem Hospital.

The work is important because it shows the early political views and radicalism that would evolve in Shelley's later writings. In this work Shelley, in the guise of Margaret Nicholson, attacks the British monarchy as oppressive and burdensome on the people. He expresses his antiwar and antimonarchical views. He blames absolutist and monarchist governments for fomenting wars. These political views would be developed further in Queen Mab in 1812. This work is significant as the earliest expression of Shelley's political radicalism and reformist views.

Shelley perceived "Monarchs" as the "Oppressors of mankind". He wrote: "Kings are but dust—the last eventful day/Will level all and make them lose their sway;/Will dash the sceptre from the Monarch's hand,/And from the warrior's grasp wrest the ensanguin'd brand." Shelley would later more fully develop these political views in Queen Mab, The Revolt of Islam, and "Ozymandias". This early work is important because it shows the genesis and initial development of Shelley's views on politics and political reform.

Donald H. Reiman and Neil Fraistat in their edition of The Complete Poetry of Percy Bysshe Shelley argued that the work was important because it anticipated Shelley's mature poetry: "The personae whom PBS chose as the author and editor of PF and his method in constructing PF seem to involve a nexus of mutually supportive public and private associations that anticipate (albeit in a crude form) the complex intertwining of traditional myth, literary precedent, historical allusion, scientific knowledge, and personal emotion that characterize his mature poetry" (pp. 240–41).

Margaret Nicholson was a real person who is remembered today chiefly through the Shelley work. She attempted to assassinate King George III in 1786 with a knife. In spite of the title, she was still alive in 1810, dying in Bethlem Royal Hospital on 14 May 1828. Shelley also has a poem on Charlotte Corday, who assassinated Jean-Paul Marat in 1793. François Ravaillac, the assassin of King Henry IV of France in 1610, is also a subject of the poem. Shelley, however, uses the real-life Margaret Nicholson only as a starting-off point to develop and to espouse a theory of revolution and emancipation from monarchical rule. The real-life Margaret Nicholson has very little in common with Shelley's fictional recreation; she was evidently unbalanced to the point of insanity. Her motives for the attack were based on a delusion that she was the rightful heir to the throne of England. Shelley is not retelling the story of her life but using it as merely a premise to develop a radical new political theory or vision. This theory would be developed in Shelley's subsequent works such as Queen Mab and the novella "The Assassins". What is important are not the facts of her life but the political views that Shelley would espouse in the work. In this important early work, Shelley presents his theories on political reform and revolution, which would subsequently evolve and develop in his writings.

== Contents ==
- Advertisement
- Posthumous Fragments ("Ambition, power, and avarice, now have hurl'd")
- Fragment. Supposed to be an Epithalamium of Francis Ravaillac and Charlotte Corday. Chorus of Spirits. Symphony. Francis. Charlotte. ("'Tis midnight now—athwart the murky air,")
- Despair
- Fragment ("Yes! all is past—swift time has fled away,")
- The Spectral Horseman
- Melody to a Scene of Former Times

== Reception ==
According to Donald H. Reiman and Neil Fraistat in The Complete Poetry of Percy Bysshe Shelley, the work was published in a limited run of 250 copies. The copies were sold and the work was not reprinted, although Shelley expected a second edition. The work thus became rare and copies were difficult to find. The work was, however, reprinted in 1877 by Harry Buxton Forman for private distribution. The volume was not reviewed, but an advertisement was placed in the 17 November 1810 edition of the Oxford University and City Herald that it would be sold by the publisher John Munday according to Thomas Hutchinson in The Complete Poetical Works, Volume 3. In a letter while he was a student at Oxford, Shelley wrote: "It sells wonderfully here, & is become the fashionable subject of discussion."

== Sources ==
- Infoplease article on Posthumous Fragments of Margaret Nicholson.
- Description of the work in The Complete Poetical Works of Shelley.
- Posthumous Fragments of Margaret Nicholson on Poets.org.
- Borushko, Matthew C. (July 2020). "Politics, Petitions, and Violence in Shelley’s Posthumous Fragments of Margaret Nicholson." Keats-Shelley Review, 34(2):97-106. Retrieved 20 January 2026.
- Duff, David. "Harps, Heroes and Yelling Vampires: The 1810 Poetry Collections", in The Neglected Shelley, edited by Alan A. Weinberg and Timothy Webb, Surrey, UK: Ashgate, 2015.
- Forman, Harry Buxton, editor. Posthumous Fragments of Margaret Nicholson by Percy Bysshe Shelley. Printed for private distribution, 1877.
- Goslee, Nancy Moore. "On The Complete Poetry of Percy Bysshe Shelley, Vol. 1. Edited by Donald H. *Reiman and Neil Fraistat". Romantic Circles Reviews, 6.1 (2003).
- Hogg, Thomas Jefferson. The Life of Percy Bysshe Shelley. Volume 1. London: Edward Moxon, 1858.
- Hutchinson, Thomas. The Complete Poetical Works of Shelley. Vol. 3. Penn State University Press, 2003. Contains analysis of Posthumous Fragments of Margaret Nicholson.
- Levinson, Margorie. The Romantic Fragment Poem: A Critique of a Form. Chapel Hill and London: University of North Carolina Press, 1986.
- Medwin, Thomas. The Shelley Papers: Memoir of Percy Bysshe Shelley and Original Poems and Papers. London: Whittaker, Treacher, and Co., 1833.
- "1,210 FOR SHELLEY HOAX". The New York Times. 26 July 1922.
- Quinney, Laura. "Teeth of Mouldy Blue". (21 September 2000). London Review of Books, Vol. 22, No. 18. 21 September 2000. Review of The Complete Poetry of Percy Bysshe Shelley: Volume I, edited by Donald Reiman and Neil Fraisat. Johns Hopkins, 494 pp.
- Slicer, Thomas R. Percy Bysshe Shelley: An Appreciation. NY: Privately Printed, 1903.
- Woudhuysen, H. R. "Shelley's Fantastic Prank: An Extraordinary Pamphlet Comes to Light". The Sunday Times, 12 July 2006.
