= Friedrich Julius Hammer =

German poet (1810–1862)

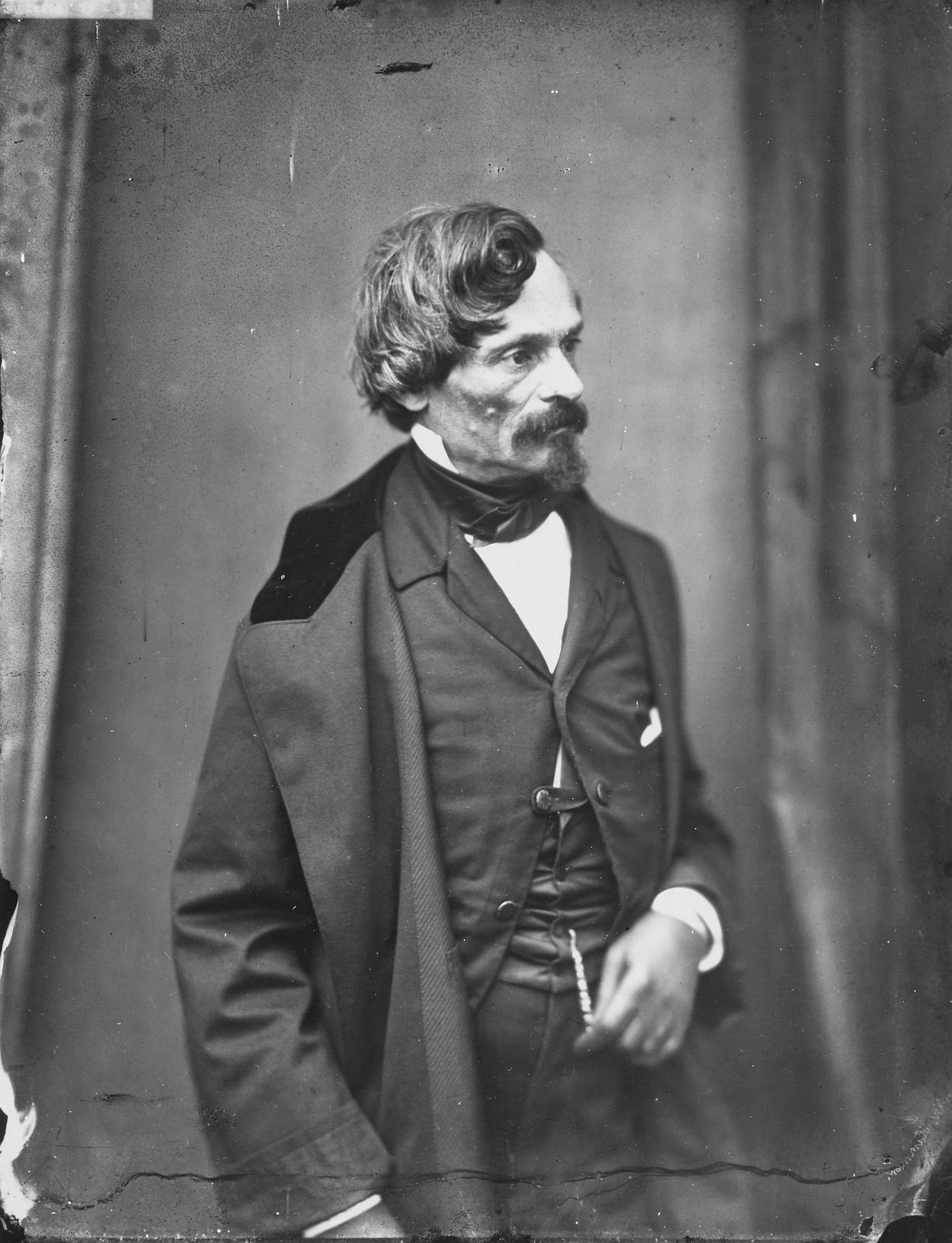
Friedrich Julius Hammer.

Friedrich Julius Hammer (7 June 1810 – 23 August 1862) was a German poet born in Dresden.

In 1831 he went to Leipzig to study law, but devoted himself mainly to philosophy and belles lettres. Returning to Dresden in 1834 a small comedy, Das seltsame Frühstück, introduced him to the literary society of the capital, notably to Ludwig Tieck, and from this time he devoted himself entirely to writing. In 1837 he returned to Leipzig, and, coming again to Dresden, from 1851 to 1859 edited the feuilleton of Sächsische konstitutionelle Zeitung, and took the lead in the foundation in 1855 of the Schiller Institute in Dresden. His marriage in 1851 had made him independent, and he bought a small property at Pillnitz, on which, soon after his return from a residence of several years at Nuremberg, he died.

Hammer wrote, besides several comedies, a drama Die Brüder (1856), a number of unimportant romances, and the novel Einkehr und Umkehr (Leipzig, 1856); but his reputation rests upon his epigrammatic and didactic poems. His Schau um dich, und schau in dich (1851), which made his name, has passed through more than thirty editions. It was followed by In allen guten Stunden (1854), Fester Grund (1857), Auf stillen Wegen (1859), and Lerne, liebe, lebe (1862).

Besides these he wrote a book of Turkish songs, Unter dem Halbmond (Leipzig, 1860), and rhymed versions of the psalms (1861), and compiled the popular religious anthology Leben und Heimat in Gott, of which a 14th edition was published in 1900. He was a member of the "Naturforschenden Gesellschaft Isis" in Dresden.
