= 1811 in literature =

This article contains information about the literary events and publications of 1811.

== Events ==
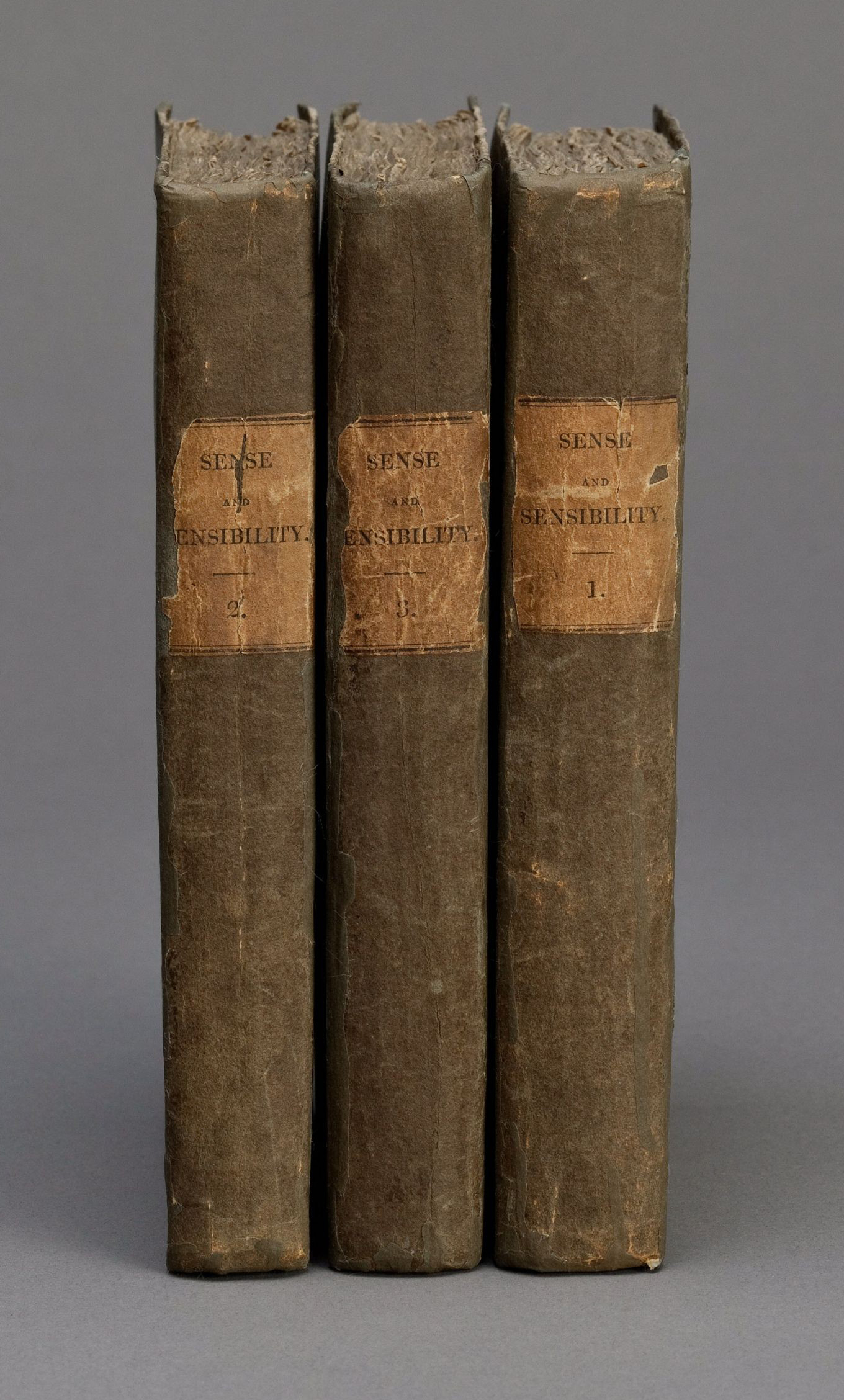
The three volumes of the first edition of Sense and Sensibility, 1811

- March 25 – The University of Oxford expels the first-year undergraduate Percy Bysshe Shelley after he and Thomas Jefferson Hogg refuse to answer questions on The Necessity of Atheism, a pamphlet they have published anonymously. Earlier this year, Shelley, as "A Gentleman of the University of Oxford", has published in London Poetical Essay on the Existing State of Things, containing a 172-line anti-monarchy and anti-war poem in support of Peter Finnerty (jailed this year for libel against Lord Castlereagh) and dedicated to Harriet Westbrook. Shelley's Gothic fiction St. Irvyne; or, The Rosicrucian: A Romance, published under the same designation and dated this year was actually issued in December 1810.
- June – Walter Scott buys a farm at Abbotsford, Scotland, and commences building his future residence, Abbotsford House.
- October 30 – Jane Austen publishes her first novel: Sense and Sensibility ("by a lady") at her own expense in three volumes, priced at 15 shillings, in Thomas Egerton's Military Library (Whitehall, London).
- November 4 – Lord Byron meets Thomas Campbell and Thomas Moore at the home of Samuel Rogers, where the company discusses literary topics.
- November 21 – German poet Heinrich von Kleist shoots his terminally ill lover Henriette Vogel and then himself, on the shore of the Kleiner Wannsee near Potsdam.
- unknown dates
  - Friedrich Koenig, with the assistance of Andreas Friedrich Bauer, produces the first steam printing press, in London.
  - The first complete publication of the Bible in the Ume Sami language appears.

== New books ==
=== Fiction ===
- Jane Austen – Sense and Sensibility
- Mary Brunton – Self-Control
- Charlotte Dacre – The Passions
- Friedrich de la Motte Fouqué – Undine
- Johann Peter Hebel – Schatzkästlein des rheinischen Hausfreundes
- Rachel Hunter – The Schoolmistress
- Heinrich von Kleist – Michael Kohlhaas
- Mary Meeke – Stratagems Defeated
- Lady Morgan – The Missionary: An Indian Tale
- Emma Parker – Elfrida, Heiress of Belgrove
- Percy Bysshe Shelley – St. Irvyne; or, The Rosicrucian
- Elizabeth Thomas – Mortimer Hall

=== Drama ===
- Marianne Chambers – Ourselves
- Joseph George Holman – The Gazette Extraordinary
- Richard Leigh – Where to Find a Friend

=== Poetry ===
- Anna Maria Porter – Ballad Romances, and Other Poems
- Thomas Pringle – The Institute: a Heroic Poem
- Mary Russell Mitford – Christina, the Maid of the South Seas

=== Non-fiction ===
- Johann Wolfgang von Goethe – Aus meinem Leben: Dichtung und Wahrheit (The Autobiography of Goethe: Truth and Poetry from my own Life)
- Barthold G. Niebuhr – Roman History
- John Roberton – On Diseases of the Generative System
- Percy Bysshe Shelley – The Necessity of Atheism

== Births ==
- January 9 – Gilbert Abbott à Beckett, English humorist (died 1856)
- February 1 – Arthur Henry Hallam, English poet (died 1833)
- February 19 – Jules Sandeau, French dramatist and novelist (died 1883)
- February 27 – Alexandru Hrisoverghi, Moldavian poet and translator (died 1837)
- June 14 – Harriet Beecher Stowe, American novelist and abolitionist (died 1896)
- July 9 – Fanny Fern, American journalist, novelist and children's writer (died 1872)
- July 18 – William Makepeace Thackeray, English novelist and satirist (died 1863)
- August 31 – Théophile Gautier, French poet and novelist (died 1872)
- September 17 – August Blanche, Swedish writer and statesman (died 1868)
- October 19 – Andreas Munch, Norwegian poet (died 1884)

== Deaths ==
- January 10 – Joseph Chénier, French poet and dramatist (born 1764)
- March 7 – Juraj Fándly, Slovak non-fiction writer, entomologist and priest (born 1750)
- May 7 – Richard Cumberland, English dramatist (born 1732)
- July 28 – Heinrich Joseph von Collin, Austrian dramatist (born 1771)
- September 14 – James Grahame, Scottish poet (born 1765)
- September 30 – Thomas Percy, English ballad collector and bishop (born 1729)
- November 21 – Heinrich von Kleist, German poet (suicide, born 1777)
- December 19 – Marjorie Fleming, Scottish child writer (born 1803 in literature)
