= 1896 United States presidential election in Ohio =

- November 3, 1896
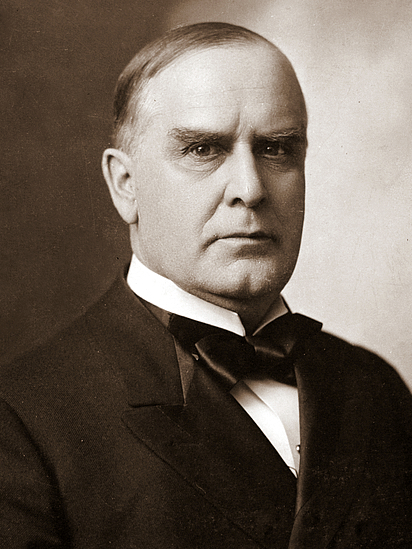

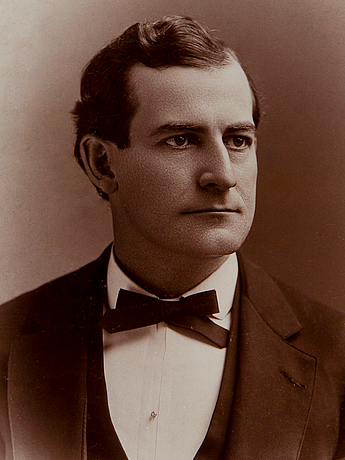
Nominee	William McKinley	William Jennings Bryan
Party	Republican	Democratic
Alliance		Populist
Home state	Ohio	Nebraska
Running mate	Garret Hobart	Arthur Sewall
Electoral vote	23	0
Popular vote	525,991	477,497
Percentage	51.86%	47.08%
County results
McKinley
40–50%
50–60%
60–70%
Bryan
40–50%
50–60%
60–70%
70–80%
President before election
Grover Cleveland
Democratic
Elected President
William McKinley
Republican

The 1896 United States presidential election in Ohio was held on November 3, 1896, as part of the 1896 United States presidential election. State voters chose 23 electors to the Electoral College, who voted for president and vice president.

Since the Civil War, Ohio politics had been controlled by a conflict between the anti-Civil War Appalachian southeast and German-American counties of the northwest, opposed both to the heavily Yankee and New Englander northeast and to the Ohio Company counties of the southeast. There was also an area of the Virginia Military District in the southwest that was historically the state's Whig stronghold and later voted Republican. The GOP had consistently controlled the state during this era, if largely due to the prevalence of Ohio natives on the ticket, losing only one electoral vote to Democrat Grover Cleveland in 1892.

In 1896, the Democratic Party moved away from its urban northeastern Irish-American base to attempt to forge an alliance of the developing Jim Crow “Solid South” with the Populist West. The Midwest had seen the nation's worst labor strife in the years between the 1892 and 1896 elections, and the Republican Party saw Bryan as attempting to ferment class war. Although Ohio had been affected severely by the farm crisis of the early 1890s, its strong coverage by rail transport made this much less of a problem than it was in the more remote Plains States.

Consequently, Ohio was narrowly won by the Republican Party candidate and native son, William McKinley, with 51.86% of the popular vote. The Democratic Party candidate, William Jennings Bryan, garnered 47.08% of the popular vote. McKinley won his home state by a narrow margin of 4.78%.

Bryan would lose Ohio to McKinley again four years later and would later lose the state again in 1908 to William Howard Taft.

== Results ==
1896 United States presidential election in Ohio
Party	Candidate	Votes	Percentage	Electoral votes
Republican	William McKinley	525,991	51.86%	23
Democratic	William Jennings Bryan	474,882	46.82%	0
Populist	William Jennings Bryan	2,615	0.26%	0
Total	William Jennings Bryan	477,497	47.08%	0
Prohibition	Joshua Levering	5,068	0.50%	0
National Prohibition	Charles Eugene Bentley	2,716	0.27%	0
National Democratic	John M. Palmer	1,858	0.18%	0
Socialist Labor	Charles H. Matchett	1,165	0.11%	0
Totals		1,014,295	100.0%	23

=== Results by county ===
County	William McKinley Republican		William Jennings Bryan Democratic		Various candidates Other parties		Margin		Total votes cast
County	#	%	#	%	#	%	#	%	Total votes cast
Adams	3,338	50.13%	3,248	48.78%	73	1.10%	90	1.35%	6,659
Allen	4,959	43.01%	6,394	55.46%	176	1.53%	-1,435	-12.45%	11,529
Ashland	2,608	42.89%	3,422	56.28%	50	0.82%	-814	-13.39%	6,080
Ashtabula	8,557	67.70%	3,840	30.38%	242	1.91%	4,717	37.32%	12,639
Athens	5,429	61.02%	3,293	37.01%	175	1.97%	2,136	24.01%	8,897
Auglaize	2,900	36.75%	4,939	62.59%	52	0.66%	-2,039	-25.84%	7,891
Belmont	7,699	53.66%	6,413	44.70%	236	1.64%	1,286	8.96%	14,348
Brown	3,170	41.08%	4,485	58.13%	61	0.79%	-1,315	-17.04%	7,716
Butler	5,936	40.21%	8,724	59.09%	103	0.70%	-2,788	-18.89%	14,763
Carroll	2,668	57.07%	1,955	41.82%	52	1.11%	713	15.25%	4,675
Champaign	4,314	55.13%	3,432	43.86%	79	1.01%	882	11.27%	7,825
Clark	7,667	53.89%	6,382	44.86%	179	1.26%	1,285	9.03%	14,228
Clermont	4,272	47.36%	4,672	51.80%	76	0.84%	-400	-4.43%	9,020
Clinton	4,144	60.18%	2,657	38.59%	85	1.23%	1,487	21.59%	6,886
Columbiana	9,487	57.80%	6,598	40.20%	329	2.00%	2,889	17.60%	16,414
Coshocton	3,340	45.23%	3,979	53.89%	65	0.88%	-639	-8.65%	7,384
Crawford	3,150	34.37%	5,915	64.53%	101	1.10%	-2,765	-30.17%	9,166
Cuyahoga	42,993	52.76%	37,542	46.07%	955	1.17%	5,451	6.69%	81,490
Darke	4,384	41.28%	6,151	57.92%	84	0.79%	-1,767	-16.64%	10,619
Defiance	2,414	36.01%	4,239	63.24%	50	0.75%	-1,825	-27.23%	6,703
Delaware	3,789	50.39%	3,612	48.04%	118	1.57%	177	2.35%	7,519
Erie	5,442	53.18%	4,641	45.35%	150	1.47%	801	7.83%	10,233
Fairfield	3,432	39.20%	5,250	59.96%	74	0.85%	-1,818	-20.76%	8,756
Fayette	3,357	54.54%	2,748	44.65%	50	0.81%	609	9.89%	6,155
Franklin	20,291	51.96%	18,320	46.91%	442	1.13%	1,971	5.05%	39,053
Fulton	3,227	55.99%	2,464	42.75%	73	1.27%	763	13.24%	5,764
Gallia	4,247	63.66%	2,369	35.51%	55	0.82%	1,878	28.15%	6,671
Geauga	2,807	68.20%	1,260	30.61%	49	1.19%	1,547	37.59%	4,116
Greene	5,296	62.51%	3,003	35.45%	173	2.04%	2,293	27.07%	8,472
Guernsey	4,337	55.78%	3,258	41.90%	180	2.32%	1,079	13.88%	7,775
Hamilton	57,749	59.86%	38,165	39.56%	561	0.58%	19,584	20.30%	96,475
Hancock	5,591	49.66%	5,546	49.26%	121	1.07%	45	0.40%	11,258
Hardin	4,276	49.50%	4,247	49.16%	116	1.34%	29	0.34%	8,639
Harrison	3,151	57.36%	2,245	40.87%	97	1.77%	906	16.49%	5,493
Henry	2,558	36.91%	4,323	62.37%	50	0.72%	-1,765	-25.47%	6,931
Highland	4,106	50.32%	3,909	47.91%	144	1.76%	197	2.41%	8,159
Hocking	2,746	46.00%	3,177	53.22%	47	0.79%	-431	-7.22%	5,970
Holmes	1,284	25.93%	3,622	73.16%	45	0.91%	-2,338	-47.22%	4,951
Huron	5,008	53.98%	4,185	45.11%	84	0.91%	823	8.87%	9,277
Jackson	4,439	53.46%	3,786	45.59%	79	0.95%	653	7.86%	8,304
Jefferson	6,185	60.61%	3,824	37.48%	195	1.91%	2,361	23.14%	10,204
Knox	3,762	47.72%	4,062	51.52%	60	0.76%	-300	-3.81%	7,884
Lake	3,745	68.40%	1,682	30.72%	48	0.88%	2,063	37.68%	5,475
Lawrence	5,408	63.42%	3,050	35.77%	69	0.81%	2,358	27.65%	8,527
Licking	5,560	45.32%	6,611	53.89%	96	0.78%	-1,051	-8.57%	12,267
Logan	4,722	59.56%	3,125	39.42%	81	1.02%	1,597	20.14%	7,928
Lorain	7,801	63.28%	4,367	35.43%	159	1.29%	3,434	27.86%	12,327
Lucas	16,758	54.45%	13,759	44.71%	259	0.84%	2,999	9.74%	30,776
Madison	3,308	54.01%	2,751	44.91%	66	1.08%	557	9.09%	6,125
Mahoning	8,529	55.27%	6,772	43.88%	131	0.85%	1,757	11.39%	15,432
Marion	3,426	45.40%	4,016	53.21%	105	1.39%	-590	-7.82%	7,547
Medina	3,533	57.32%	2,575	41.77%	56	0.91%	958	15.54%	6,164
Meigs	4,696	64.27%	2,536	34.71%	75	1.03%	2,160	29.56%	7,307
Mercer	1,991	29.16%	4,790	70.16%	46	0.67%	-2,799	-41.00%	6,827
Miami	6,051	52.60%	5,387	46.83%	65	0.57%	664	5.77%	11,503
Monroe	2,001	32.07%	4,180	67.00%	58	0.93%	-2,179	-34.93%	6,239
Montgomery	18,333	53.56%	15,540	45.40%	359	1.05%	2,793	8.16%	34,232
Morgan	2,531	51.12%	2,375	47.97%	45	0.91%	156	3.15%	4,951
Morrow	2,506	48.79%	2,517	49.01%	113	2.20%	-11	-0.21%	5,136
Muskingum	7,245	50.67%	6,871	48.05%	183	1.28%	374	2.62%	14,299
Noble	2,559	51.86%	2,318	46.98%	57	1.16%	241	4.88%	4,934
Ottawa	2,079	38.69%	3,260	60.67%	34	0.63%	-1,181	-21.98%	5,373
Paulding	3,580	49.30%	3,656	50.34%	26	0.36%	-76	-1.05%	7,262
Perry	3,989	48.63%	4,112	50.13%	102	1.24%	-123	-1.50%	8,203
Pickaway	3,370	44.23%	4,165	54.67%	84	1.10%	-795	-10.43%	7,619
Pike	2,228	50.64%	2,145	48.75%	27	0.61%	83	1.89%	4,400
Portage	4,073	50.01%	3,995	49.05%	76	0.93%	78	0.96%	8,144
Preble	3,300	49.56%	3,254	48.87%	105	1.58%	46	0.69%	6,659
Putnam	2,728	33.68%	5,303	65.48%	68	0.84%	-2,575	-31.79%	8,099
Richland	5,115	44.70%	6,256	54.67%	73	0.64%	-1,141	-9.97%	11,444
Ross	5,562	52.32%	4,967	46.73%	101	0.95%	595	5.60%	10,630
Sandusky	3,970	43.28%	5,105	55.66%	97	1.06%	-1,135	-12.37%	9,172
Scioto	5,492	59.44%	3,658	39.59%	90	0.97%	1,834	19.85%	9,240
Seneca	4,988	43.51%	6,347	55.36%	130	1.13%	-1,359	-11.85%	11,465
Shelby	2,488	38.35%	3,941	60.74%	59	0.91%	-1,453	-22.40%	6,488
Stark	12,111	51.13%	11,339	47.87%	235	0.99%	772	3.26%	23,685
Summit	8,584	51.25%	8,020	47.88%	146	0.87%	564	3.37%	16,750
Trumbull	7,867	66.23%	3,829	32.24%	182	1.53%	4,038	34.00%	11,878
Tuscarawas	6,235	47.15%	6,898	52.16%	92	0.70%	-663	-5.01%	13,225
Union	3,476	55.36%	2,736	43.57%	67	1.07%	740	11.79%	6,279
Van Wert	3,957	49.26%	3,984	49.60%	92	1.15%	-27	-0.34%	8,033
Vinton	2,035	52.43%	1,821	46.92%	25	0.64%	214	5.51%	3,881
Warren	4,379	60.53%	2,794	38.62%	61	0.84%	1,585	21.91%	7,234
Washington	5,949	52.99%	5,182	46.16%	95	0.85%	767	6.83%	11,226
Wayne	4,369	43.09%	5,588	55.11%	182	1.80%	-1,219	-12.02%	10,139
Williams	3,191	47.16%	3,530	52.17%	45	0.67%	-339	-5.01%	6,766
Wood	7,290	51.54%	6,653	47.04%	201	1.42%	637	4.50%	14,144
Wyandot	2,374	40.44%	3,441	58.62%	55	0.94%	-1,067	-18.18%	5,870
Totals	525,991	51.86%	477,497	47.08%	10,807	1.07%	48,494	4.78%	1,014,295

== See also ==
- United States presidential elections in Ohio
