= Maria Rebecca Davison =

British stage actress

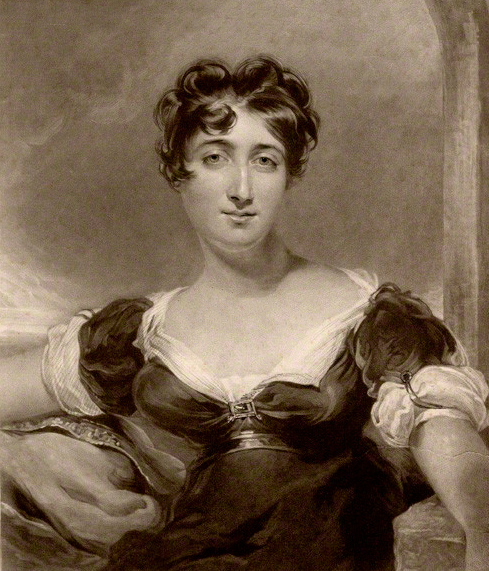
- Born: 1780
- Died: 1858 (aged 77–78)
- Occupation: Actress
- Known for: Juliana in the "Honeymoon"
- Spouse: James Davison

Maria Rebecca Davison (1780?–1858) was a British stage actress. She was billed as Miss Duncan in the early years of her career before her marriage. She appeared as a leading performer at the London patent theatres Covent Garden, the Haymarket Theatre and particularly at Drury Lane.

== Description ==
Davison was taller than average, with dark hair, and strongly formed with very expressive features. She had a fine voice and a good knowledge of music, sang with much expression, and was in her day unequalled in such Scotch ballads as John Anderson and Roy's Wife. Her singing as Marchioness Mérida in the Travellers,, which took place at Drury Lane 13 May 1823, proved she was an opera singer. It was said that there was no better exponent of Lady Teazle, Lady Townly, Beatrice, and other similar parts. As Juliana in the Honeymoon she had no rival. Leigh Hunt gave her large amounts of credit in his Critical Essays on the Performers of the London Theatres, and speaks of her as the best lady our comic stage possesses, and advocates her ability to capture the audience and transform herself into a masculine figure. She is mentioned with implied commendation by Hazlitt, and Talfourd says in the New Monthly Magazine (vol. vi.) of her Mrs. Sullen in The Beaux' Stratagem, that she acts it "in high style," that it is "by far her best character," and that he wishes for nothing better of the kind.

== Early life ==
Maria Rebecca Duncan was born to actors who had worked in Liverpool, which is believed to be Duncan's place of birth. As a child, she played mostly hobgoblins, fairies and cupids, in Dublin, Liverpool, and Newcastle. Her first recorded appearance was, according to varying accounts, in 1794–5, as the Duke of York to the Richard III of George Frederick Cooke. She also played Rosella at an early age in Love in a Village and Polly in Bate Dudley's opera The Woodman. Miss Farren, by whom she was noticed in the last-named character, is said to have recognized in her, a talent kindred to her own.

== Acting career ==
Her first regular engagement was from Tate Wilkinson, as a member of whose company she appeared in York near the end of last century, playing as her first role, Sophia in Holcroft's Road to Ruin, and Gillim in Dibdin's The Quaker. As she became more popular, she acted in Edinburgh, Glasgow, and Liverpool. At Margate in 1804, she was engaged by Wroughton for Drury Lane, where she appeared 8 October 1804 as Miss Duncan from Edinburgh, playing Lady Teazle to the Sir Peter of Mathews, and the Charles Surface of Elliston. Rosalind in As You Like It followed on the 18th, and Lady Townly on the 27th. Miss Hardcastle, Sylvia in The Recruiting Officer, Maria in The Way to Keep Him, Miranda in the Busy Body, Lydia Languish, Letitia Hardy in The Belle's Stratagem, and many other leading characters were taken in the course of her first season.

On 31 January 1805, she "created" the role of Juliana in the Honeymoon, the character she is most well known for playing. She was with the Drury Lane company for fourteen years, travelling with them to the Lyceum. The presence of Mrs. Jordan was for some time an obstacle. Miss Duncan, however, was loved by audiences everywhere, not only in the characters named, but in parts essentially in Mrs. Jordan's line, such as Nell in the Devil to Pay, Peggy in the Country Girl, and Priscilla in The Romp.

On 31 October 1812, she married James Davison, and on 5 November 1812 played as Mrs. Davison, late miss Duncan, Belinda in All in the Wrong. On 8 September 1819, she made her first appearance at Covent Garden, as Lady Teazle to Macready's Joseph Surface. The following year, on 31 October, she returned to Drury Lane, as Julia in the Rivals, for one night only. On 15 June 1821 she played Lady Teazle for her benefit at Covent Garden, and Marian Ramsay in Turn out.

In 1825, Mrs. Davison was at the Haymarket, taking leading business. Afterwards, in the same year she returned to Drury Lane, acting Villetta in She Would and She Would Not, Flippanta in the Confederacy, Mrs. Candour, &c. In the season of 1827–8 she was still at Drury Lane, assuming elderly characters, Lucretia McTab, Mrs. Dangleton in the Wealthy Widow, &c. As Mrs. Subtle in Paul Pry, 13 June 1829, she is once more mentioned in connection with Drury Lane. This is thought to be her last appearance there. Her subsequent performances, if any, were presumably at other theatres.

She lived for many years in retirement, greatly respected, and died at Brompton on 30 May 1858, ten weeks after her husband.

== Selected roles ==
- Juliana in The Honeymoon by John Tobin (1805)
- Maria in A Prior Claim by Henry James Pye (1805)
- Florence in The Curfew by John Tobin (1807)
- Lady Morden in Where to Find a Friend by Richard Leigh (1811)
- Miss Beaufort in Ourselves by Marianne Chambers (1811)
- Lady Wellgrove in The Faro Table by John Tobin (1816)
- Lady Ratcliffe in Forget and Forgive by James Kenney (1827)

== Bibliography ==
- This article incorporates text from a publication now in the public domain: Knight, John Joseph (1888). "Davison, Maria Rebecca". In Stephen, Leslie (ed.). Dictionary of National Biography. Vol. 14. London: Smith, Elder & Co.
