= Charles Mathews =

English theatre manager and comic actor (1776-1835)

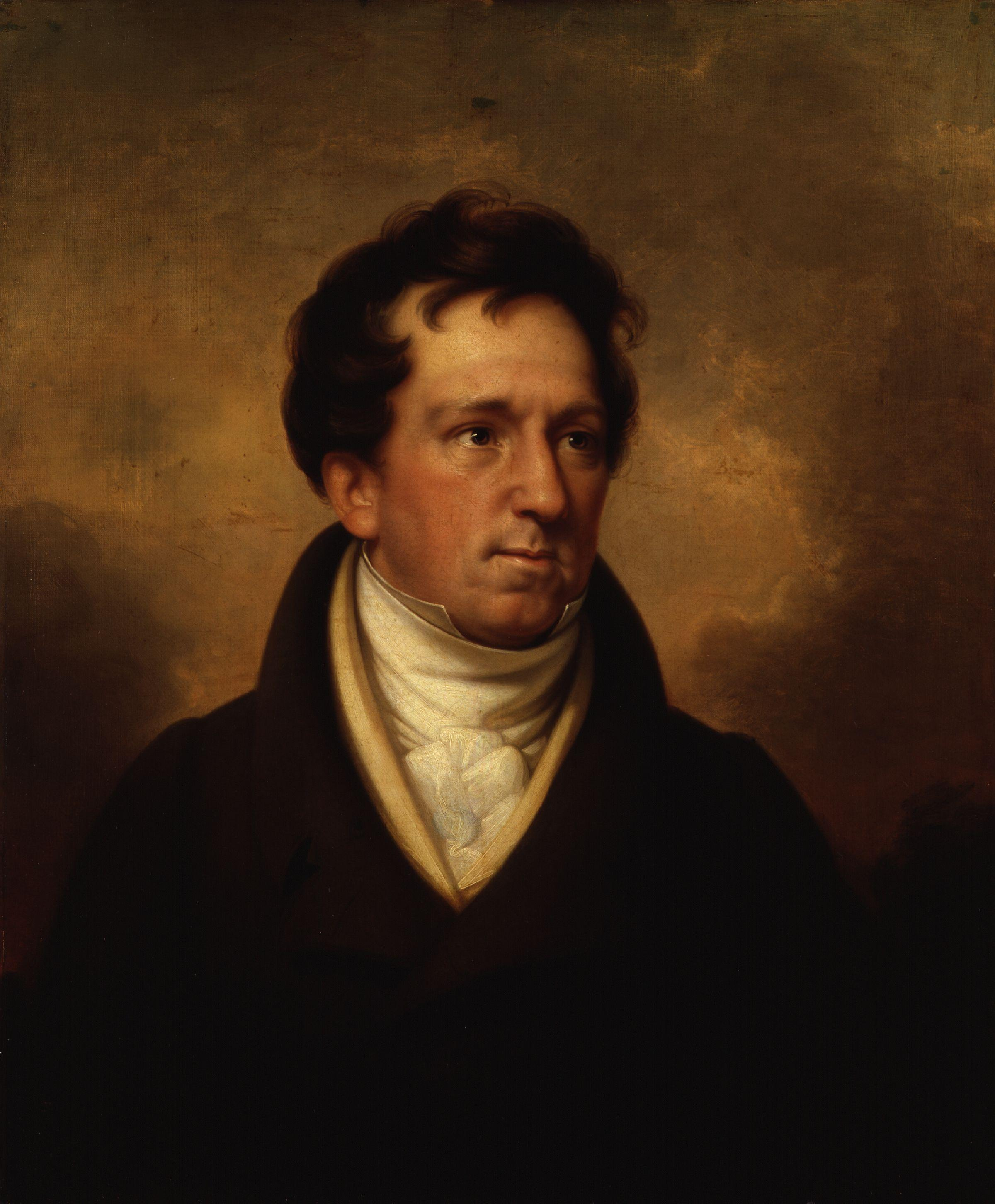
- Charles Mathews by Rembrandt Peale
- Born: 28 June 1776; Devonport, Devon
- Died: 28 June 1835 (aged 59); Plymouth
- Occupations: Stage actor, theatre manager
- Spouse: Eliza Kirkham Strong (m. 1797; died 1802)

Charles Mathews (28 June 1776, London – 28 June 1835, Devonport) was an English theatre manager and comic actor, well known during his time for his gift of impersonation and skill at table entertainment. His play At Home, in which he played every character, was the first monopolylogue and the defining work in the genre.

== Early life ==
Charles was born to James Mathews (died 1804), a Wesleyan Methodist bookseller, printer, and pharmacist on the Strand, who also served as minister in one of the Countess of Huntingdon's chapels. Charles was educated at Merchant Taylors' School in London, which had some openings for common boys. He was next apprenticed to his father. For religious reasons, the father forbade his children from visiting theatres.

During his youth, Charles met the actor Robert William Elliston; after attending the Drury Lane theatre, he was utterly fascinated by that world. Charles left his father in September 1793 for his first public stage appearance at the Old Richmond Theatre. The following year his father allowed him to take up acting in Dublin, writing, "Charles, there are your indentures, and there are twenty guineas; I do not approve of the stage, but I will not oppose your wishes. At any time hereafter, should you feel inclined to turn to an honest calling, there are twenty guineas more, if you send for them, and your father's house is open to you." Charles never claimed the extra 20 guineas.

== Career ==
For several years Mathews took bit parts, but on 15 May 1803 he made his first London appearance at the Haymarket, as Jabel in Cumberland's The Jew and as Lingo in The Agreeable Surprise. As a continued public success, he was taken on at the Drury Lane. His gift for mimicry enabled him to disguise his personality without a change of costume. His versatility and originality were displayed in his one man show, or "monodramatic entertainment," entitled At Home or Matthews at Home, which he initiated in the Lyceum Theatre in 1808. Leigh Hunt wrote that his table entertainments "for the richness and variety of his humour, were as good as half a dozen plays distilled." The show combined mimicry, storytelling, recitations, improvisation, quick-change artistry, and comic song.

In 1822–1823 Mathews toured the United States to great success, though he was libeled by the Philadelphia Gazette. When he brought suit against the paper, he was awarded 3,000 crowns for damages. During his stay, he developed a number of impressions of American types. One of these was the African American, said to have been based on the American black actor James Hewlett, who performed Shakespeare roles at the African Grove. In his next show, A Trip to America, Mathews sang a version of the popular slave freedom song, "Possum Up a Gum Tree", performing in dialect and possibly in blackface. One author called him "the paterfamilias of the Yankee theatre and the progenitor of all native American dialect comedy."

A Trip to America also sparked an exchange of critical essays between Mathews and American critic John Neal in The European Magazine and London Review over what Neal considered the actor's inaccurate portrayal of New Englanders. "He knows, in his own heart," said Neal, "that his Jonathan is a very poor, and very feeble counterfeit, unworthy of America, unworthy of Mr. M., as an actor, and altogether unworthy of his country. It is untrue and he knows it".

Returning to England in autumn 1823, he joined Frederick Henry Yates, manager of the Adelphi Theatre. During his successful career, Mathews, together with John Kemble and John Braham, was received as a guest by George IV. A few years after his return from the US, Mathews bought a half-share in the Adelphi Theatre. His connection with the Adelphi was a critical and popular success for Mathews, but not a financial success. In 1834, he made a second tour performing in the United States. He cut his trip short and returned ill from the tour, after his last appearance in New York City on 11 February 1835.

Failing to recover his health, Mathews died poor in Plymouth in June 1835, without appearing again on a British stage.

== Personal life ==
In 1797, Mathews married Eliza Kirkham Strong (1772–1802) of Exeter, the author of a volume of poems and some novels, and an actress. She retired from the stage in 1801 and died in 1802.

In 1803, Mathews married Anne Jackson (died 1869), an actress and half sister to the actress Frances Maria Kelly. Anne Jackson Mathews wrote a biography of Mathews. His only child by his second wife was Charles James Mathews, who became a successful actor in turn.

== In popular culture ==
- The character of Alfred Jingle in Charles Dickens' novel, The Pickwick Papers, is said to have been inspired by Mathews.

== Selected roles ==
- Triangle in Guilty or Not Guilty by Thomas Dibdin (1804)
- Robert in The Land We Live In by Francis Ludlow Holt (1804)
- Matthew Daw in The School for Friends by Marianne Chambers (1805)
- Spriggins in Five Miles Off by Thomas Dibdin (1806)
- Blunt in The Vindictive Man by Thomas Holcroft (1806)
- Lawyer Verdict in Errors Excepted by Thomas Dibdin (1807)
- Joe Thresher in Grieving's a Folly by Richard Leigh (1809)
- Sir Guy Staunch in Education by Thomas Morton (1813)
- Gonsalvo in Fazio by Henry Hart Milman (1818)
