= The Curfew (play) =

1807 play

- Original language: English
- Written by: John Tobin
- Genre: Tragedy

Premiere
- Date: 19 February 1807
- Place: Theatre Royal, Drury Lane, London

The Curfew is a historical tragedy by the British writer John Tobin which was first published in 1807, three years after the author's death. It was staged by Richard Brinsley Sheridan at the Theatre Royal, Drury Lane in London premiering on 19 February 1807. The cast included William Barrymore as Hugh de Tracy, John Bannister as Robert, Henry Siddons as Bertrand, William Penley as Walter, Robert William Elliston as Fitzharding, Edmund John Eyre as Philip, Jane Powell as Matilda and Maria Duncan as Florence. It appeared at the Crow Street Theatre in Dublin on 1 April the same year. It is set during the Norman era.

== Bibliography ==
- Bushnell, Rebecca.A Companion to Tragedy. John Wiley & Sons, 2009.
- Greene, John C. Theatre in Dublin, 1745-1820: A Calendar of Performances, Volume 6. Lexington Books, 2011.
- Nicoll, Allardyce . A History of English Drama 1660-1900, Volume 4. Cambridge University Press, 2009.
