= The Faro Table =

1816 play by John Tobin

- Original language: English
- Written by: John Tobin
- Genre: Comedy

Premiere
- Date: 5 November 1816
- Place: Theatre Royal, Drury Lane, London

The Faro Table is a comedy play by the British writer John Tobin. Written in the late 1790s, it was initially agreed to be staged by Richard Brinsley Sheridan, the manager of the Theatre Royal, Drury Lane, who then pulled out of the arrangement. Possibly this was because the character Lady Nightshade was too obviously based on Lady Sarah Archer, one of the Faro Ladies. It drew inspiration from Sheridan's The School for Scandal, particularly the character of Sir Oliver, who is here renamed Barton Around the time Tobin died of tuberculosis, he enjoyed great success with The Honey Moon, leading to greater demand for his unstaged works.

It was published posthumously by John Murray and finally premiered in the West End at Drury Lane on 5 November 1816. A prologue was written by Thomas Love Peacock, while the cast included William Dowton as Barton, James William Wallack as Sedgemore, John Pritt Harley as Hint, William Oxberry as Sapling, Sarah Harlowe as Lady Nightshade and Maria Rebecca Davison as Lady Wellgrove.

== Bibliography ==
- Greig, Hannah. The Beau Monde: Fashionable Society in Georgian London. OUP Oxford, 2013.
- Ragussis, Michael. Theatrical Nation: Jews and Other Outlandish Englishmen in Georgian Britain. University of Pennsylvania Press, 2012.
