= New Englanders =

New Englanders Yankees
- Flag of New England

Total population
- 14,810,001 (2017 est.)

Regions with significant populations
- States of New England: Connecticut, Maine, Massachusetts, New Hampshire, Rhode Island, Vermont
- Connecticut: 3,588,184
- Maine: 1,335,907
- Massachusetts: 6,859,819
- New Hampshire: 1,342,795
- Rhode Island: 1,059,639
- Vermont: 623,657

Languages
- English (New England English), French (New England French), other languages of New England

Religion
- Predominantly Christianity (Roman Catholicism, Protestantism), Judaism, Irreligious

Related ethnic groups
- Other Americans, Canadians

New Englanders, also called Yankees, are the inhabitants of the New England region in the Northeastern United States. Beginning with the New England Colonies, the name "New Englander" refers to those who live in the six New England states or those with cultural or family ties to the region. The region was originally inhabited by Algonquin Indigenous peoples, including the Abenakis, Mi'kmaq, Penobscot, Pequots, Mohegans, Narragansetts, Pocumtucks, and Wampanoag. The region was first settled by European colonists from the Mayflower as part of the Plymouth Company in 1620. The region has seen many different waves of immigration since 1620, creating a unique and diverse culture. New Englanders have played a prominent role in the colonial and modern history of the United States, from political dynasties to influential artists and writers. Famous for their distinct dialect and attitude, New Englanders hold a strong regional identity and a distinct history and culture within the United States.

== Terminology ==
The region was named "New England" by English explorer John Smith in 1616.

A common term to refer to those who live in New England is "Yankee". Depending on the context Yankee may refer to all Americans in general, but in the colloquial American context, it refers to those who live in the Northeastern United States and even more specifically New England. Originally employed to describe New Englanders with ancestral roots to the original English settlers, the term has evolved throughout American history to have a variety of contextual meanings.

== See also ==
- Culture of New England
- Demographics of New England
- Nutmegger
- Swamp Yankee
- Old Stock Americans
- Acadians
- Cuisine of New England
