= Table entertainment =

A table entertainment was only partly musical in character, and was given by a single performer sitting at a table and telling stories and jokes, giving displays of mimicry, singing songs, and so forth.

The first table entertainments on record were performed by George Alexander Stevens in Dublin in 1752. Charles Dibdin began a series of table entertainments in London in 1789 and continued them for 20 years, introducing most of his songs in this way.

Perhaps the master of the table entertainment was Charles Mathews, who began his show At Home or Mathews at Home, in London's Lyceum Theatre in 1808. According to Leigh Hunt, Mathews's table entertainments were unparalleled "for the richness and variety of his humour, and were as good as half a dozen plays distilled." At Home combined mimicry, storytelling, recitations, improvisation, quick-change artistry, and comic song. Along with its rousing popularity on the English stage, Mathews had some success in twice bringing the show to the United States.
