= 1908 United States presidential election in Ohio =

- November 3, 1908

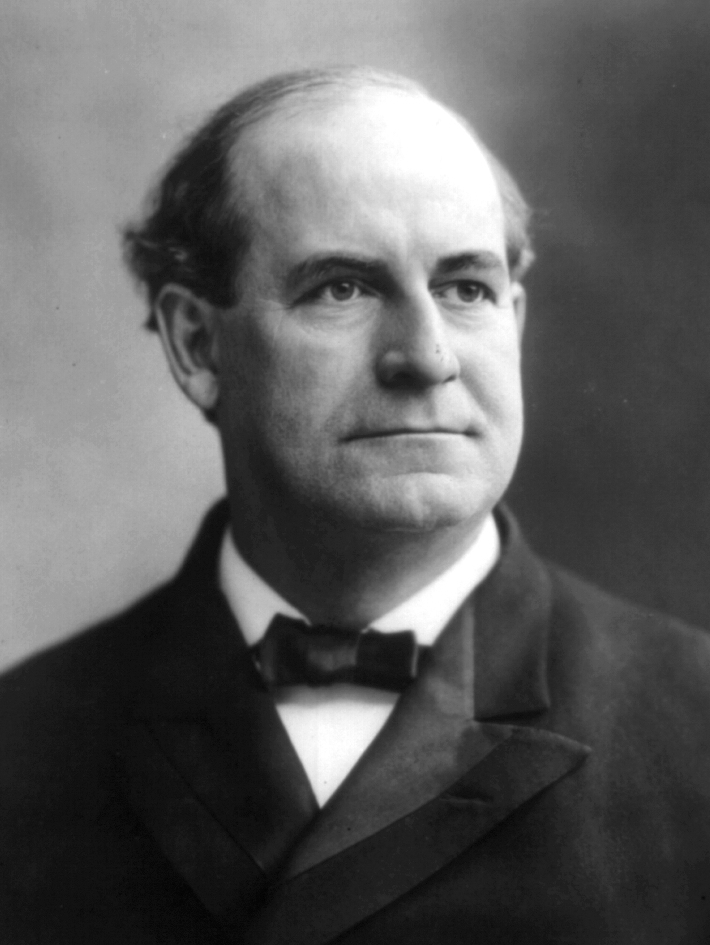
| Nominee | William Howard Taft | William Jennings Bryan |
| Party | Republican | Democratic |
| Home state | Ohio | Nebraska |
| Running mate | James S. Sherman | John W. Kern |
| Electoral vote | 23 | 0 |
| Popular vote | 572,312 | 502,721 |
| Percentage | 51.03% | 44.82% |
County results
Taft
40–50%
50–60%
60–70%
70–80%
Bryan
40–50%
50–60%
60–70%
President before election
Theodore Roosevelt
Republican
Elected President
William Howard Taft
Republican

The 1908 United States presidential election in Ohio was held on November 3, 1908, as part of the 1908 United States presidential election. State voters chose 23 electors to the Electoral College, who voted for president and vice president.

Since the Civil War, Ohio politics had been controlled by a conflict between the anti-Civil War Appalachian southeast and German-American counties of the northwest, opposed both to the heavily Yankee and New Englander northeast and to the Ohio Company counties of the southeast. There was also an area of the Virginia Military District in the southwest that was historically the state's Whig stronghold and later voted Republican. The GOP had consistently controlled the state during this era, if largely due to the prevalence of Ohio natives on the ticket, losing only one electoral vote to Democrat Grover Cleveland in 1892. Following the nomination of William Jennings Bryan for the first time in 1896, another Ohio native and former governor in William McKinley strengthened the party's hold on the state by his appeal to white ethnic migrants in Ohio's cities. McKinley would also defeat Bryan in Ohio in 1900

In his third campaign against an Ohio native, Bryan extensively toured Ohio, associating Taft with John D. Rockefeller and Standard Oil – whom Bryan criticized as "vicious lawbreakers". In September 1908 there had been reports of a major swing that would give Bryan a chance to be the first Democrat to carry the state since Franklin Pierce in 1852, but a week before Bryan's tour it was reported that Gold Democrats and labor were turning away from Bryan.

Ultimately, Taft won the state by a margin of 6.21%, a margin less than a third that by which Theodore Roosevelt defeated Alton B. Parker four years earlier.

== Results ==
1908 United States presidential election in Ohio
| Party | Candidate | Votes | Percentage | Electoral votes |
|---|---|---|---|---|
| Republican | William Howard Taft | 572,312 | 51.03% | 23 |
| Democratic | William Jennings Bryan | 502,721 | 44.82% | 0 |
| Socialist | Eugene V. Debs | 33,795 | 3.01% | 0 |
| Prohibition | Eugene W. Chafin | 11,402 | 1.02% | 0 |
| Socialist Labor | August Gillhaus | 721 | 0.06% | 0 |
| Independence | Thomas L. Hisgen | 439 | 0.04% | 0 |
| People's | Thomas E. Watson | 162 | 0.01% | 0 |
| Totals | | 1,121,552 | 100.0% | 23 |

=== Results by county ===
| County | William Howard Taft Republican | | William Jennings Bryan Democratic | | Eugene V. Debs Socialist | | Eugene W. Chafin Prohibition | | Various candidates Other parties | | Margin | | Total votes cast |
| County | # | % | # | % | # | % | # | % | # | % | # | % | Total votes cast |
|---|---|---|---|---|---|---|---|---|---|---|---|---|---|
| Adams | 3,432 | 52.11% | 3,048 | 46.28% | 17 | 0.26% | 88 | 1.34% | 1 | 0.02% | 384 | 5.83% | 6,586 |
| Allen | 5,841 | 43.08% | 7,195 | 53.07% | 373 | 2.75% | 127 | 0.94% | 21 | 0.15% | -1,354 | -9.99% | 13,557 |
| Ashland | 2,804 | 42.66% | 3,627 | 55.18% | 56 | 0.85% | 84 | 1.28% | 2 | 0.03% | -823 | -12.52% | 6,573 |
| Ashtabula | 8,213 | 63.32% | 3,572 | 27.54% | 938 | 7.23% | 231 | 1.78% | 16 | 0.12% | 4,641 | 35.78% | 12,970 |
| Athens | 6,449 | 61.57% | 3,654 | 34.88% | 164 | 1.57% | 189 | 1.80% | 19 | 0.18% | 2,795 | 26.68% | 10,475 |
| Auglaize | 3,001 | 38.55% | 4,622 | 59.38% | 102 | 1.31% | 57 | 0.73% | 2 | 0.03% | -1,621 | -20.82% | 7,784 |
| Belmont | 8,193 | 48.02% | 7,750 | 45.42% | 730 | 4.28% | 378 | 2.22% | 12 | 0.07% | 443 | 2.60% | 17,063 |
| Brown | 2,638 | 38.02% | 4,242 | 61.14% | 23 | 0.33% | 35 | 0.50% | 0 | 0.00% | -1,604 | -23.12% | 6,938 |
| Butler | 7,320 | 40.61% | 9,678 | 53.70% | 885 | 4.91% | 85 | 0.47% | 56 | 0.31% | -2,358 | -13.08% | 18,024 |
| Carroll | 2,517 | 59.42% | 1,590 | 37.54% | 44 | 1.04% | 83 | 1.96% | 2 | 0.05% | 927 | 21.88% | 4,236 |
| Champaign | 4,153 | 55.69% | 3,160 | 42.38% | 46 | 0.62% | 93 | 1.25% | 5 | 0.07% | 993 | 13.32% | 7,457 |
| Clark | 8,917 | 52.97% | 6,529 | 38.78% | 1,040 | 6.18% | 326 | 1.94% | 22 | 0.13% | 2,388 | 14.19% | 16,834 |
| Clermont | 4,137 | 48.91% | 4,150 | 49.07% | 107 | 1.27% | 61 | 0.72% | 3 | 0.04% | -13 | -0.15% | 8,458 |
| Clinton | 4,107 | 61.45% | 2,464 | 36.87% | 28 | 0.42% | 76 | 1.14% | 8 | 0.12% | 1,643 | 24.58% | 6,683 |
| Columbiana | 9,626 | 53.26% | 6,736 | 37.27% | 948 | 5.25% | 742 | 4.11% | 20 | 0.11% | 2,890 | 15.99% | 18,072 |
| Coshocton | 3,606 | 44.46% | 4,106 | 50.62% | 311 | 3.83% | 83 | 1.02% | 5 | 0.06% | -500 | -6.16% | 8,111 |
| Crawford | 3,061 | 32.84% | 6,006 | 64.44% | 166 | 1.78% | 78 | 0.84% | 9 | 0.10% | -2,945 | -31.60% | 9,320 |
| Cuyahoga | 56,344 | 55.39% | 39,954 | 39.27% | 4,818 | 4.74% | 351 | 0.35% | 262 | 0.26% | 16,390 | 16.11% | 101,729 |
| Darke | 4,951 | 42.60% | 6,391 | 54.99% | 70 | 0.60% | 210 | 1.81% | 1 | 0.01% | -1,440 | -12.39% | 11,623 |
| Defiance | 2,531 | 39.05% | 3,754 | 57.91% | 112 | 1.73% | 72 | 1.11% | 13 | 0.20% | -1,223 | -18.87% | 6,482 |
| Delaware | 4,007 | 52.77% | 3,330 | 43.86% | 64 | 0.84% | 186 | 2.45% | 6 | 0.08% | 677 | 8.92% | 7,593 |
| Erie | 5,366 | 50.14% | 4,983 | 46.56% | 293 | 2.74% | 41 | 0.38% | 19 | 0.18% | 383 | 3.58% | 10,702 |
| Fairfield | 4,023 | 40.24% | 5,821 | 58.22% | 25 | 0.25% | 125 | 1.25% | 4 | 0.04% | -1,798 | -17.98% | 9,998 |
| Fayette | 3,343 | 56.84% | 2,451 | 41.68% | 33 | 0.56% | 49 | 0.83% | 5 | 0.09% | 892 | 15.17% | 5,881 |
| Franklin | 28,914 | 53.45% | 23,314 | 43.10% | 1,211 | 2.24% | 606 | 1.12% | 52 | 0.10% | 5,600 | 10.35% | 54,097 |
| Fulton | 3,608 | 61.24% | 2,131 | 36.17% | 69 | 1.17% | 82 | 1.39% | 2 | 0.03% | 1,477 | 25.07% | 5,892 |
| Gallia | 3,914 | 63.48% | 2,171 | 35.21% | 25 | 0.41% | 50 | 0.81% | 6 | 0.10% | 1,743 | 28.27% | 6,166 |
| Geauga | 2,596 | 71.20% | 982 | 26.93% | 32 | 0.88% | 32 | 0.88% | 4 | 0.11% | 1,614 | 44.27% | 3,646 |
| Greene | 4,902 | 60.14% | 2,882 | 35.36% | 232 | 2.85% | 125 | 1.53% | 10 | 0.12% | 2,020 | 24.78% | 8,151 |
| Guernsey | 5,210 | 53.92% | 3,449 | 35.69% | 798 | 8.26% | 196 | 2.03% | 10 | 0.10% | 1,761 | 18.22% | 9,663 |
| Hamilton | 63,803 | 56.49% | 45,429 | 40.22% | 3,306 | 2.93% | 317 | 0.28% | 91 | 0.08% | 18,374 | 16.27% | 112,946 |
| Hancock | 4,899 | 45.44% | 5,420 | 50.27% | 356 | 3.30% | 93 | 0.86% | 13 | 0.12% | -521 | -4.83% | 10,781 |
| Hardin | 4,444 | 50.35% | 4,164 | 47.17% | 99 | 1.12% | 117 | 1.33% | 3 | 0.03% | 280 | 3.17% | 8,827 |
| Harrison | 3,069 | 59.36% | 1,961 | 37.93% | 51 | 0.99% | 87 | 1.68% | 2 | 0.04% | 1,108 | 21.43% | 5,170 |
| Henry | 2,425 | 37.81% | 3,817 | 59.52% | 121 | 1.89% | 49 | 0.76% | 1 | 0.02% | -1,392 | -21.71% | 6,413 |
| Highland | 4,149 | 51.23% | 3,823 | 47.21% | 23 | 0.28% | 93 | 1.15% | 10 | 0.12% | 326 | 4.03% | 8,098 |
| Hocking | 2,749 | 47.72% | 2,864 | 49.71% | 95 | 1.65% | 47 | 0.82% | 6 | 0.10% | -115 | -2.00% | 5,761 |
| Holmes | 1,252 | 28.74% | 3,043 | 69.84% | 29 | 0.67% | 31 | 0.71% | 2 | 0.05% | -1,791 | -41.11% | 4,357 |
| Huron | 4,930 | 52.73% | 4,262 | 45.58% | 90 | 0.96% | 61 | 0.65% | 7 | 0.07% | 668 | 7.14% | 9,350 |
| Jackson | 4,489 | 55.84% | 3,235 | 40.24% | 209 | 2.60% | 90 | 1.12% | 16 | 0.20% | 1,254 | 15.60% | 8,039 |
| Jefferson | 7,310 | 57.21% | 4,882 | 38.21% | 355 | 2.78% | 225 | 1.76% | 5 | 0.04% | 2,428 | 19.00% | 12,777 |
| Knox | 4,318 | 49.09% | 4,233 | 48.12% | 139 | 1.58% | 99 | 1.13% | 7 | 0.08% | 85 | 0.97% | 8,796 |
| Lake | 3,635 | 66.97% | 1,605 | 29.57% | 121 | 2.23% | 63 | 1.16% | 4 | 0.07% | 2,030 | 37.40% | 5,428 |
| Lawrence | 5,708 | 66.67% | 2,654 | 31.00% | 134 | 1.57% | 65 | 0.76% | 1 | 0.01% | 3,054 | 35.67% | 8,562 |
| Licking | 6,756 | 44.55% | 7,685 | 50.67% | 598 | 3.94% | 119 | 0.78% | 8 | 0.05% | -929 | -6.13% | 15,166 |
| Logan | 4,756 | 58.44% | 3,186 | 39.15% | 76 | 0.93% | 116 | 1.43% | 4 | 0.05% | 1,570 | 19.29% | 8,138 |
| Lorain | 8,699 | 57.10% | 5,460 | 35.84% | 944 | 6.20% | 108 | 0.71% | 24 | 0.16% | 3,239 | 21.26% | 15,235 |
| Lucas | 18,715 | 48.46% | 16,208 | 41.97% | 3,394 | 8.79% | 169 | 0.44% | 134 | 0.35% | 2,507 | 6.49% | 38,620 |
| Madison | 3,051 | 54.93% | 2,430 | 43.75% | 17 | 0.31% | 55 | 0.99% | 1 | 0.02% | 621 | 11.18% | 5,554 |
| Mahoning | 10,760 | 51.18% | 9,312 | 44.29% | 631 | 3.00% | 298 | 1.42% | 22 | 0.10% | 1,448 | 6.89% | 21,023 |
| Marion | 4,175 | 46.12% | 4,657 | 51.44% | 99 | 1.09% | 116 | 1.28% | 6 | 0.07% | -482 | -5.32% | 9,053 |
| Medina | 3,427 | 57.32% | 2,378 | 39.77% | 118 | 1.97% | 52 | 0.87% | 4 | 0.07% | 1,049 | 17.54% | 5,979 |
| Meigs | 4,108 | 62.05% | 2,225 | 33.61% | 222 | 3.35% | 59 | 0.89% | 7 | 0.11% | 1,883 | 28.44% | 6,621 |
| Mercer | 2,148 | 31.92% | 4,456 | 66.22% | 46 | 0.68% | 73 | 1.08% | 6 | 0.09% | -2,308 | -34.30% | 6,729 |
| Miami | 6,558 | 53.69% | 5,369 | 43.95% | 182 | 1.49% | 100 | 0.82% | 6 | 0.05% | 1,189 | 9.73% | 12,215 |
| Monroe | 1,974 | 32.74% | 3,961 | 65.69% | 38 | 0.63% | 57 | 0.95% | 0 | 0.00% | -1,987 | -32.95% | 6,030 |
| Montgomery | 20,069 | 47.09% | 20,566 | 48.26% | 1,780 | 4.18% | 177 | 0.42% | 23 | 0.05% | -497 | -1.17% | 42,615 |
| Morgan | 2,445 | 53.99% | 1,932 | 42.66% | 56 | 1.24% | 92 | 2.03% | 4 | 0.09% | 513 | 11.33% | 4,529 |
| Morrow | 2,500 | 51.06% | 2,239 | 45.73% | 30 | 0.61% | 121 | 2.47% | 6 | 0.12% | 261 | 5.33% | 4,896 |
| Muskingum | 8,080 | 52.36% | 6,576 | 42.62% | 420 | 2.72% | 340 | 2.20% | 15 | 0.10% | 1,504 | 9.75% | 15,431 |
| Noble | 2,707 | 54.27% | 2,154 | 43.18% | 28 | 0.56% | 93 | 1.86% | 6 | 0.12% | 553 | 11.09% | 4,988 |
| Ottawa | 2,202 | 39.48% | 3,329 | 59.69% | 25 | 0.45% | 17 | 0.30% | 4 | 0.07% | -1,127 | -20.21% | 5,577 |
| Paulding | 3,049 | 51.62% | 2,767 | 46.84% | 19 | 0.32% | 63 | 1.07% | 9 | 0.15% | 282 | 4.77% | 5,907 |
| Perry | 4,304 | 49.48% | 3,885 | 44.67% | 398 | 4.58% | 102 | 1.17% | 9 | 0.10% | 419 | 4.82% | 8,698 |
| Pickaway | 3,119 | 43.15% | 4,007 | 55.43% | 22 | 0.30% | 76 | 1.05% | 5 | 0.07% | -888 | -12.28% | 7,229 |
| Pike | 1,798 | 45.54% | 2,085 | 52.81% | 24 | 0.61% | 34 | 0.86% | 7 | 0.18% | -287 | -7.27% | 3,948 |
| Portage | 4,129 | 51.16% | 3,625 | 44.91% | 183 | 2.27% | 127 | 1.57% | 7 | 0.09% | 504 | 6.24% | 8,071 |
| Preble | 3,519 | 50.99% | 3,247 | 47.05% | 42 | 0.61% | 90 | 1.30% | 3 | 0.04% | 272 | 3.94% | 6,901 |
| Putnam | 2,483 | 33.17% | 4,836 | 64.61% | 95 | 1.27% | 65 | 0.87% | 6 | 0.08% | -2,353 | -31.44% | 7,485 |
| Richland | 5,301 | 43.01% | 6,702 | 54.37% | 213 | 1.73% | 102 | 0.83% | 8 | 0.06% | -1,401 | -11.37% | 12,326 |
| Ross | 5,432 | 49.69% | 5,325 | 48.71% | 89 | 0.81% | 75 | 0.69% | 10 | 0.09% | 107 | 0.98% | 10,931 |
| Sandusky | 4,079 | 42.74% | 5,242 | 54.93% | 172 | 1.80% | 47 | 0.49% | 3 | 0.03% | -1,163 | -12.19% | 9,543 |
| Scioto | 5,790 | 53.52% | 4,310 | 39.84% | 589 | 5.44% | 119 | 1.10% | 10 | 0.09% | 1,480 | 13.68% | 10,818 |
| Seneca | 4,959 | 43.08% | 6,138 | 53.32% | 307 | 2.67% | 88 | 0.76% | 20 | 0.17% | -1,179 | -10.24% | 11,512 |
| Shelby | 2,646 | 40.06% | 3,879 | 58.73% | 38 | 0.58% | 38 | 0.58% | 4 | 0.06% | -1,233 | -18.67% | 6,605 |
| Stark | 14,112 | 50.48% | 12,286 | 43.95% | 1,110 | 3.97% | 405 | 1.45% | 44 | 0.16% | 1,826 | 6.53% | 27,957 |
| Summit | 10,365 | 47.31% | 9,930 | 45.32% | 1,255 | 5.73% | 328 | 1.50% | 31 | 0.14% | 435 | 1.99% | 21,909 |
| Trumbull | 6,978 | 58.00% | 4,476 | 37.20% | 397 | 3.30% | 165 | 1.37% | 15 | 0.12% | 2,502 | 20.80% | 12,031 |
| Tuscarawas | 6,717 | 47.29% | 6,775 | 47.69% | 559 | 3.94% | 120 | 0.84% | 34 | 0.24% | -58 | -0.41% | 14,205 |
| Union | 3,567 | 57.04% | 2,568 | 41.07% | 31 | 0.50% | 83 | 1.33% | 4 | 0.06% | 999 | 15.98% | 6,253 |
| Van Wert | 3,809 | 49.28% | 3,783 | 48.95% | 77 | 1.00% | 55 | 0.71% | 5 | 0.06% | 26 | 0.34% | 7,729 |
| Vinton | 1,916 | 55.10% | 1,496 | 43.03% | 25 | 0.72% | 32 | 0.92% | 8 | 0.23% | 420 | 12.08% | 3,477 |
| Warren | 4,233 | 60.51% | 2,656 | 37.96% | 50 | 0.71% | 53 | 0.76% | 4 | 0.06% | 1,577 | 22.54% | 6,996 |
| Washington | 5,648 | 48.66% | 5,771 | 49.72% | 58 | 0.50% | 126 | 1.09% | 4 | 0.03% | -123 | -1.06% | 11,607 |
| Wayne | 4,388 | 43.51% | 5,368 | 53.23% | 149 | 1.48% | 174 | 1.73% | 5 | 0.05% | -980 | -9.72% | 10,084 |
| Williams | 3,625 | 50.84% | 3,329 | 46.69% | 60 | 0.84% | 109 | 1.53% | 7 | 0.10% | 296 | 4.15% | 7,130 |
| Wood | 5,904 | 49.57% | 5,625 | 47.23% | 209 | 1.75% | 163 | 1.37% | 9 | 0.08% | 279 | 2.34% | 11,910 |
| Wyandot | 2,408 | 41.36% | 3,353 | 57.59% | 32 | 0.55% | 23 | 0.40% | 6 | 0.10% | -945 | -16.23% | 5,822 |
| Totals | 572,312 | 51.03% | 502,721 | 44.82% | 33,795 | 3.01% | 11,402 | 1.02% | 1,322 | 0.12% | 69,591 | 6.20% | 1,121,552 |

== See also ==
- United States presidential elections in Ohio
