= Monopolylogue =

A monopolylogue is a form of entertainment in which one actor plays many characters. Pioneered by English actor Charles Mathews and Albert Smith and first used in 1824, later used in Shakespearean performances by the performer Henry Kemble from 1846 to 1859. Matthews referred to the genre meaning where he would play "half a dozen characters", and he would switch between characters through quickly changing costumes, ventriloquism, and "sharp differentiation of character". The genre is believed to have had influence on the writings of Charles Dickens.

The term and genre has been revived in the late 20th and early 21st century.
