= Forget and Forgive (play) =

1827 play

- Original language: English
- Written by: James Kenney
- Genre: Comedy
- Setting: Paris, present day

Premiere
- Date: 21 November 1827
- Place: Theatre Royal, Drury Lane, London

Forget and Forgive is a comedy play by the British writer James Kenney. It premiered at the Theatre Royal, Drury Lane in London on 21 November 1827. The original cast included Henry John Wallack as Charles Sydney, John Liston as Rumbold, John Cooper as Cameron, William Bennett as Sir Gregory Ogle, Maria Rebecca Davison as Lady Ratcliffe and Ellen Kean as Georgiana. Originally of five acts it was later shortened to three. It was revived under the title Frolics in France in 1828.

== Bibliography ==
- Genest, John. Some Account of the English Stage: From the Restoration in 1660 to 1830, Volume 9. H.E. Carrington, 1832.
- Nicoll, Allardyce. A History of Early Nineteenth Century Drama 1800-1850. Cambridge University Press, 1930.
- Stephen, Leslie. Dictionary of National Biography, Volume 31. Macmillan, 1892.
