= Eliza Kirkham Mathews =

British novelist and poet

- Born: 17 January 1772; Exeter, Devon
- Died: 17 January 1802 (aged 30); York, Yorkshire
- Occupations: Poet; novelist
- Spouse: Charles Mathews (m. 1797)

Eliza Kirkham Mathews (born Eliza Kirkham Strong; 17 January 1772 – 17 January 1802) was a British novelist and poet.

== Early life ==
Mathews was born on 17 January 1772 in Exeter, Devon, the daughter of an Exeter physician.

== Career ==
Mathews published her first collection of poetry, Poems in 1796, under her maiden name, Eliza Kirkham Strong, as it wasn't until 1797 she married Charles Mathews. She completed several novels and children's books as well as numerous uncollected poems, including a collection of essays called The Pharos: A Collection of Periodical Essays, published in 1787. Her final publication, the 1801 novel What Has Been, concerns a woman's inability to support her family by writing fiction. Her second poetry collection, also called Poems (1802), gathered and published posthumously, is mainly composed of sonnets, elegies, and odes.

=== Attribution issues ===
Some biographies suggest that her first novel was Simple Facts; or, The History of an Orphan published in 1793. However there is some confusion about this attribution: some sources list the author of this book as either "Mrs. Mathews" or "Charlotte Mathews".

== Personal life ==
In 1797 she married Charles Mathews (28 June 1776 – 28 June 1835), an English theatre manager and comic actor, to whom she was married until her death in 1802.

== Death ==
Mathews died of consumption in York in 1802, aged 30 years old.
