= Grieving's a Folly =

1809 play

- Original language: English
- Written by: Richard Leigh
- Genre: Comedy
- Setting: England, Present day

Premiere
- Date: 21 April 1809
- Place: Lyceum Theatre, London

Grieving's a Folly is an 1809 comedy play by the British writer Richard Leigh. It premiered on 21 April 1809 at the Lyceum Theatre in London, which was being used the Drury Lane company while their own theatre was being rebuilt after a fire. The cast included Henry Siddons as Mr Herbert, Harriet Siddons as Ellen, William Dowton as Sir Oliver Cypress, William Powell as Belford, John Bannister as Crape, John Henry Johnstone as O'Harrolan, Charles Mathews as Joe Thresher, Walter Maddocks as Jonathon, Jane Powell as Mrs Mordaunt and Frances Maria Kelly as Susan Woodburn. The prologue was written and spoken by Edmund John Eyre. It enjoyed a successful run and was published by Longmans the same year. A second play by Leigh Where to Find a Friend was performed by the company in 1811.

== Bibliography ==
- Greene, John C. Theatre in Dublin, 1745-1820: A Calendar of Performances, Volume 6. Lexington Books, 2011.
- Nicoll, Allardyce. A History of Early Nineteenth Century Drama 1800-1850. Cambridge University Press, 1930.
- Valladares, Susan. Staging the Peninsular War: English Theatres 1807-1815. Routledge, 2016.
