= Ourselves (play) =

1811 play

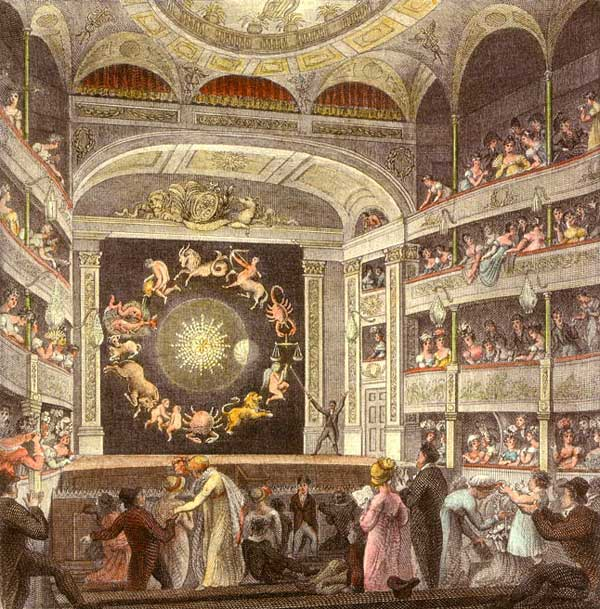
- Interior of the Lyceum.
- Original language: English
- Written by: Marianne Chambers
- Genre: Comedy
- Setting: London, Present day

Premiere
- Date: 2 March 1811
- Place: Lyceum Theatre, London

Ourselves is an 1811 comedy play by the British writer Marianne Chambers. It premiered at the Lyceum Theatre in London on 2 March 1811. The Lyceum was at the time hosting the company of the Theatre Royal, Drury Lane while it was rebuilt following damage by an 1809 fire. It was Chambers' second staged work following the successful The School for Friends in 1805. The cast included William Dowton as Sir John Rainsford, Benjamin Wrench as Sir Sydney Beaufort, Charles Holland as Fitzaubin, John Henry Johnstone as O'Shanauhan, Vincent De Camp as Darlington, William Penley as Cuff, Maria Rebecca Davison as Miss Beaufort, Julia Glover as the Unknown Lady and Sarah Harlowe as Mrs O'Shanauhan. It was performed sixteen times on its original run.

== Bibliography ==
- Genest, John. Some Account of the English Stage: From the Restoration in 1660 to 1830, Volume 8. H.E. Carrington, 1832.
- Greene, John C. Theatre in Dublin, 1745-1820: A Calendar of Performances, Volume 7. Lexington Books, 2011.
- Nicoll, Allardyce. A History of Early Nineteenth Century Drama 1800-1850. Cambridge University Press, 1930.
