= The Honey Moon =

Play by John Tobin

- Original language: English
- Written by: John Tobin.
- Characters: Juliana; Duke; Jacques

Premiere
- Date: 31 January 1805
- Place: Theatre Royal, Drury Lane

The Honey Moon is a comic stage play by John Tobin. It was influenced by Shakespeare's Taming of the Shrew and performed throughout the 19th century.

== History ==
The first performance of the play was at the Theatre Royal, Drury Lane, on 31 January 1805. Robert William Elliston played Aranza, with Miss Duncan (Maria Rebecca Davison) as Juliana. Rolando, a rejected suitor to Juliana who then wooed her sister Zamora (Maria De Camp), was played by John Bannister.

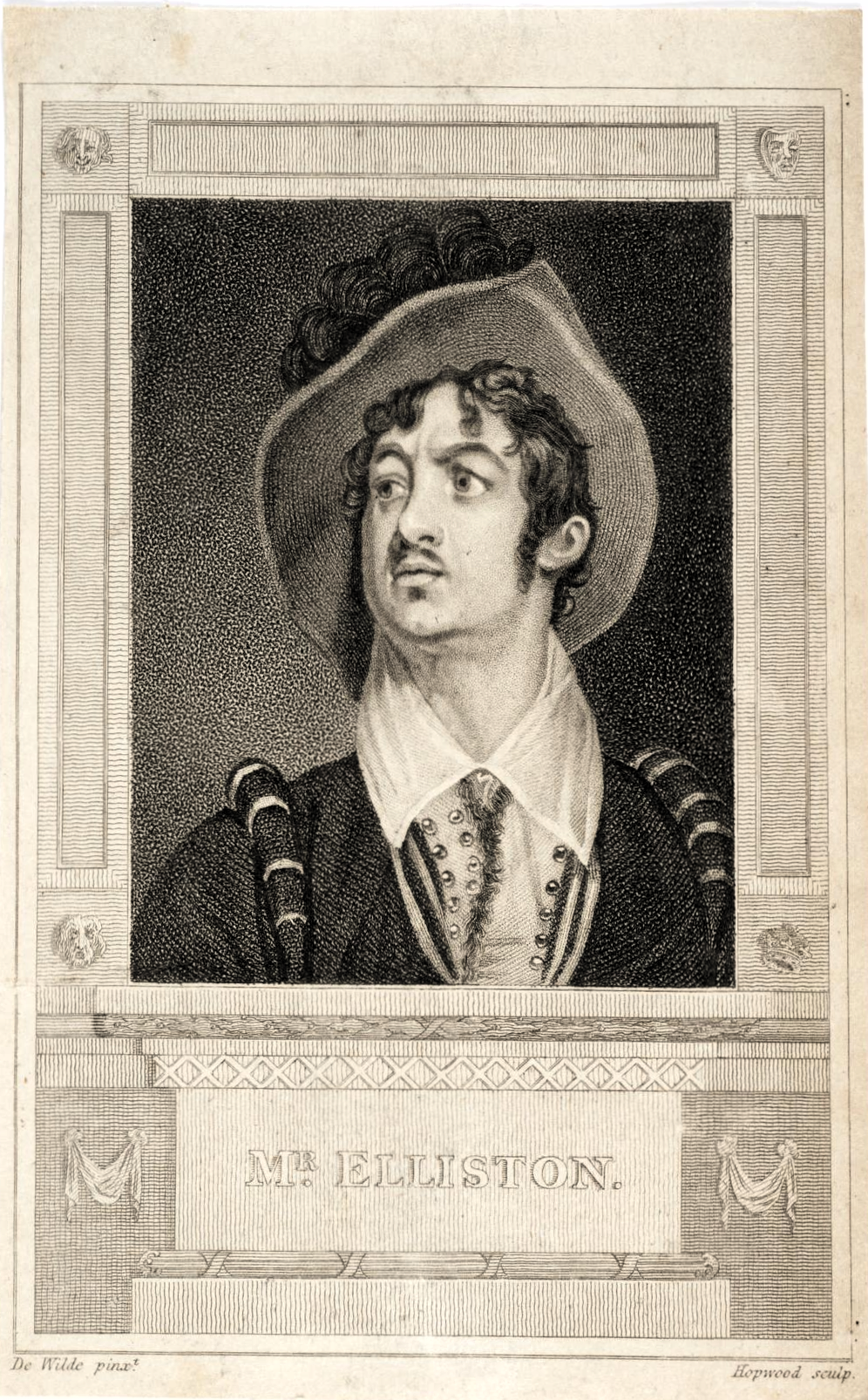
Mr Elliston as the duke

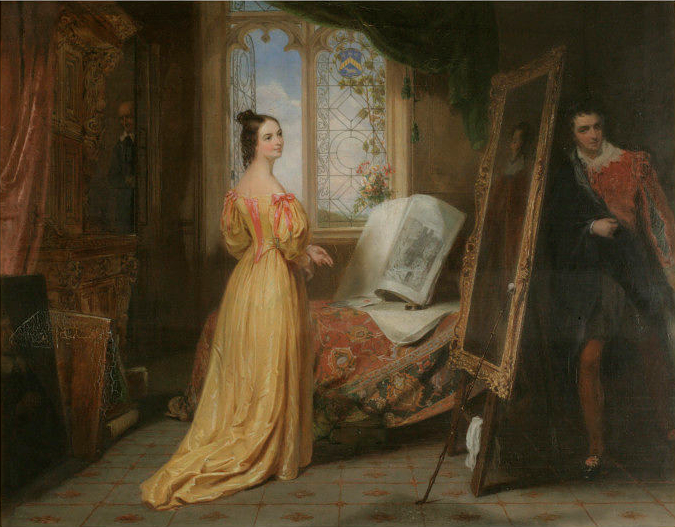
Miss Duncan as Juliana

A production was staged in Edinburgh on 14 November 1809, with Henry Siddons playing the Duke and his wife Harriet Siddons as Juliana. The play was revived at Theatre Royal, Covent Garden, on 30 June 1827, with James Warde as the Duke and Frances Eleanor Jarman as his wife.

== Plot ==
The action is set in Spain in the early 17th century. The Duke of Aranza, pretending to be a peasant who has tricked his new bride, Juliana, into marriage, takes her to their supposed new home, a modest country cottage. There he subjects her to a regime to reform her "proud spirit". When she submits to his will, he reveals his true identity and installs her in her rightful place in his palace.
