= The School for Friends =

1805 play

- Original language: English
- Written by: Marianne Chambers
- Genre: Comedy
- Setting: England, Present day

Premiere
- Date: 10 December 1805
- Place: Theatre Royal, Drury Lane, London

The School for Friends is an 1805 comedy play by the British writer Marianne Chambers. It premiered at the Theatre Royal, Drury Lane in London on 10 December 1805. The Drury Lane cast featured Robert William Elliston as Lord Belmour, Richard Wroughton as Sir Felix Mordant, William Barrymore as Sir Edward Epworth, William Dowton as Mr. Hardy, Charles Mathews as Matthew Daw, Walter Maddocks as Landlord, Jane Pope as Lady Courtland, Dorothea Jordan as Mrs. Hamilton, Harriet Siddons as Miss Emily, Harriet Mellon as Lucy and Charlotte Tidswell as Sarah. The prologue was written by James Kenney. It appeared for 25 performances on its initial run.

== Bibliography ==
- Genest, John. Some Account of the English Stage: From the Restoration in 1660 to 1830, Volume 8. H.E. Carrington, 1832.
- Greene, John C. Theatre in Dublin, 1745-1820: A Calendar of Performances, Volume 7. Lexington Books, 2011.
- Nicoll, Allardyce. A History of Early Nineteenth Century Drama 1800-1850. Cambridge University Press, 1930.
- Tomalin, Claire . Mrs Jordan's Profession: The Story of a Great Actress and a Future King. Penguin, 2003.
