= Edmund John Eyre =

English actor and dramatist

- Died: 11 April 1816 (aged 48); Scotland
- Occupations: Actor and dramatist

Edmund John Eyre (1767–1816) was an English actor and dramatist.

== Early life ==
Eyre, son of Mary (née Underwood) (c1740-c1796) and the Rev. Ambrose Eyre (c1740 - c1796), rector of Leverington and Outwell, Isle of Ely, Cambridgeshire, was born 20 May 1767. He had two brothers and four sisters. He entered Merchant Taylors' School when ten years old. In 1785 he was appointed exhibitioner — first on Parkin's and afterwards on Stuart's foundation — at Pembroke Hall, Cambridge, but left the university without graduating to join a theatrical company.

== Career ==
Eyre's Farce The Dreamer Awake; or, Pugilist Matched was performed at Covent Garden in 1791. The dedication inside the book includes a reference to Eyre, of Shrewsbury, Worcester and Wolverhampton theatres, having spent a short period on the island of Jamaica.

It appears that Eyre underwent a marriage ceremony with an Elizabeth Bolton, widow on 14 May 1793 at St.Martins, Birmingham witnessed by Joseph Neale & Sam'l Brooke. Eyre's tragedy of The Maid of Normandy; or, The Death of the Queen of France was performed in the Theatre Royal, Dublin in May 1794. The play is set in 1793, during the Reign of Terror in France, and depicts the assassination of Jean-Paul Marat, as well as the unsuccessful attempts of Marie Antoinette and her children to evade execution with the aid of Alberto, a fictional character.

Eyre and his wife were at the Theatre, Leominster in February 1794 appearing in Democratic Outrage: or, Louis the Unfortunate, Eyre as Cleri and his wife as Dauphin. In 1796 Eyre as Antonio and his wife as Nerissa, were at Gloucester Theatre in The Merchant of Venice. Eyre's Dramatic Romance The Fatal Sister; or, The Castle of the Forest was published in 1797. His address is given as 9 St. James's Street.

A Benefit for Eyre, the Musical Drama Zorinski was staged at the Theatre Royal Bath on 20 March 1800. He also gave a new Occasional Address to be spoken in the character of a Bath Volunteer.

Eyre's The Caffrees; or, Buried Alive was staged at Covent Garden in June, 1802.

His publication in February 1804 of 'Observations made at Paris during the peace' is evidence of him spending some time in France.

In 1804 he was reported to have married again, at St. Mary's, Stratford-le-Bow, to Miss Harriet Smith, actress of Bath & Bristol, and sister to Miss S Smith of the York Theatre. This promptly triggered the publication, by his first wife Elizabeth, of details of their marriage Certificate including the names of the witnesses - Joseph Neale & Sam'l Brooke. In a review of 'The West Indian' at the Edinburgh Theatre Royal Eyre, as Stockwell, is described as 'of Bath', and Dwyer of Drury-Lane played Belcour in the December.

In George Barnwell in January 1805, Eyre appeared as Thorowgood; Mrs Turpin Maria; Mrs Wrench Millwood and Mr Dwyer the hero. Early February in The Deuce is in Him Eyre was Colonel Tamper and Mrs Eyre was Emily, in To Marry or not to Marry Eyre was Mr Levensforth, Mrs Eyre was Susan in The Follies of a Day. Eyre acted the part of Lord Avondale in the comedy The School of Reform; or, How to rule a Husband on 23 February 1805 at the Theatre Royal, Edinburgh. In March he had the roles of Leonato in Much Ado About Nothing and Baron Steinfort in The Stranger. In the April at the Theatre Royal's production of Every One Has His Fault, Eyre was Solus with Mrs Young as Lady Eleanor Irwin, later in the month at the New Theatre, Glasgow opening of the comedy The Honey Moon Eyre spoke an address to a full house and was received with much applause. In the December Eyre was in Edinburgh appearing as Peter the Cruel in Henry of Transtamare, the part of Henry being written for the 'Young Roscius', the play was put on in place of Douglas, the Lord Chamberlain's licence not arriving until the very morning! In July the following year, his first appearance of the season was in the tragedy Venice Preserved as Pierre, Miss Smith (of Covent-Garden) as Belvidera, was making her fourth appearance. On Saturday she was down for Violante in The Wonder!.

After having had considerable provincial experience as a comedian, he made his first appearance at Drury Lane Theatre in October, 1806 in the character of Jaques in As You Like It. Later that month he played Captain Dudley in The West Indian. In December he played Barnwell in George Barnwell. In April 1807 The Curfew he was Philip. In June he played Las Casas in Pizarro, Cora was played by Mrs Siddons. He played Stockwell in The West Indian for the first time in September 1807. He read the prologue in Time's A Tell-Tale by William Siddons in the October.

In January 1808 his wife appeared for the first time at Drury-Lane, in the play The Castle Spectre as Angela, she is described as "possessing a good figure and a very pleasing voice", whilst her sister, Miss Smith, appeared, with Kemble, in The Mountaineers at Covent-Garden. In October 1808 Eyre was Mr Milford in The Three and The Deuce. Early December Eyre is very impressive as 'Lodovico' with Mrs Siddons as 'Josepha' in MG Lewis's Venoni: or, The Novice of St Mark's In the comedy Love for Love he was Scandal in December. In January 1809 he was Friar Lawrence in Romeo and Juliet. February saw him in Cato, a Tragedy by Joseph Addison alongside Mr and Mrs Siddons. In April 1809 the company performed for one night at The Lyceum Theatre, Strand, Eyre read the prologue for Grieving's a Folly.

In May 1809 Mr and Mrs Eyre joined the Haymarket company. In early July Eyre was Senior Malfort and his wife played Mrs Malfort in The Soldier's Daughterat the Theatre Royal Haymarket, later that month they were in The Foundling of the Forest. In 1809 the company was at the Lyceum Theatre performing the comedy Much Ado About Nothing, Eyre was in the role of Don John. In the December he was reading the prologue of the comedy Sudden Arrivals: or, Too Busy by Half. In January 1810 in the tragedy of Adelgitha he was Guiscard. Later that month he was in the cast of The Mountaineers as Bulcazin Muley. In February's new play of Riches: or, The Wife and Brother he spoke the prologue. Eyre's High Life in the City was performed at the Haymarket on 25 July, it was reported that after the third act it "was frequently interrupted by bursts of disapprobation". In the dedication inside the book, his address is given as 31 Hampden Street, Somers' town.

Eyre's The Lady of the Lake, a Melo-Dramatic Romance in three parts was performed at the Theatre-Royal, Edinburgh, in February, 1811. He is described as being of the Drury-Lane and Haymarket companies of Comedians. The following month he speaks the prologue of Ourselves, he is described as the regular Lyceum prologue speaker and very effective.

A newspaper report of 27 December 1813 lists him as one of the debtors in the King's Bench Prison, Surrey.

EDMUND JOHN EYRE, formerly of No.62, Newman-street, Oxford-road, and late of No.7, Kingsland-Row, Kingsland, both in the county of Middlesex, Actor and Dramarist

Eyre's Operatic Melo-Drama The Savage Chieftain: or, Buried Alive was put on at the Surrey Theatre on 9 May 1814. In July 1814 at the Haymarket he was Peregrine in John Bull. Eyre's The Lady of the Lake, a Melo-Dramatic Romance in three parts was reported as being performed at the Theatre-Royal, Edinburgh in December, 1814.

He is said to have been a 'respectable rather than a great actor', but the former epithet is inapplicable to his domestic life. He died 11 April 1816, leaving a pregnant widow and a large family of doubtful legitimacy. Mrs Siddons gave a free benefit to his family. Another baby, a daughter, arrived in the December, leaving his widow with eight surviving children. His widow's mother, Henrietta Smith, died in 1822.

== Writings ==
He was the author of two poems, 'A Friend to Old England,’ 4to, 1793, and 'The Two Bills' (a political piece), 4to, 1796, and of some 'Observations made at Paris during the Peace,’ 8vo, 1803, but his reputation rests upon his dramatic pieces, some of which are not without merit.

Included among them are the following:

1. 'The Dreamer Awake' (farce), 8vo, 1791.
2. 'Maid of Normandy' (tragedy), 8vo, 1793.
3. 'Consequences' (comedy), 8vo, 1794.
4. 'The Fatal Sisters' (dramatic reading), 8vo, 1797.
5. 'The Discarded Secretary' (historical), 8vo, 1799.
6. 'The Tears of Britain, or Funeral of Lord Nelson' (dramatic sketch), 8vo, 1805.
7. 'Vintagers' (melodramatic reading), 8vo, 1809.
8. 'High Life in the City' (comedy), 1810.
9. 'The Lady of the Lake' (Sir W. Scott's poem dramatised) (melodrama), 1811.
10. 'Look at Home,’ 1812.
