= Where to Find a Friend =

1811 play

- Original language: English
- Written by: Richard Leigh
- Genre: Comedy
- Setting: England, Present day

Premiere
- Date: 20 May 1811
- Place: Lyceum Theatre, London

Where to Find a Friend is a comedy play by the British writer Richard Leigh. It premiered on 20 May 1811 at the Lyceum Theatre in London, which was being used the Drury Lane company while their own theatre was being rebuilt after a fire. The original cast included Henry John Wallack as Sir Harry Morden, George Bartley as General Torrington, William Dowton as Heartly, Edward Knight as Jack Bustle, John Henry Johnstone as Barny, William Oxberry as Timothy Scamp, Joseph Ebsworth as Servant to General, Maria Rebecca Davison as Lady Morden, Frances Maria Kelly as Maria and Sarah Sparks as Mrs Bustle. It was Leigh's second play performed by the Drury Lane company following Grieving's a Folly in 1809.

== Bibliography ==
- Greene, John C. Theatre in Dublin, 1745-1820: A Calendar of Performances, Volume 6. Lexington Books, 2011.
- Nicoll, Allardyce. A History of Early Nineteenth Century Drama 1800-1850. Cambridge University Press, 1930.
