= John Tobin (dramatist) =

British playwright (1770–1804)

John Tobin (28 January 1770 – 7 December 1804) was a British playwright, who was for most of his life unsuccessful, but in the year of his death made a hit with The Honey Moon. Other plays were The Curfew and The School for Authors.

== Life ==
Tobin was born in Salisbury, the son of James Tobin, a merchant, and his wife, born Webbe, the daughter of a rich West India sugar planter. George Tobin was his elder brother. Another brother, James Webbe Tobin (died 1814), an acquaintance of Charles Lamb and Samuel Taylor Coleridge, went to Nevis. About 1775 the father set out with his wife to Nevis in the West Indies. The children were left behind, and John was placed for a while under the care of Dr. Richard Mant, the father of Richard Mant the bishop, at Southampton. After the American War of Independence, James Tobin having returned to England and settled at Redland, near Bristol, John was sent to Bristol Grammar School under Dr. Charles Lee. In 1787 he left Bristol to be articled to a solicitor in Lincoln's Inn, and, some ten years later, on his employer's death without a successor, he took over the practice in partnership with three other clerks in the office. Dissensions arose, and the arrangement broke down. Tobin eventually entered a new firm.

From 1789, Tobin had devoted time to dramatic composition. He imitated Richard Brinsley Sheridan, the Elizabethans, and Gay or Foote. Tobin approached managers thirteen times with different pieces without success. One of them, The Faro Table, was provisionally accepted by Sheridan, but then rejected. The manager of Drury Lane dallied in a similar manner with his picturesque drama "The Curfew". In 1800 his "School for Authors", which afterwards achieved success, was rejected, and it was not until April 1803 that he (due to the good opinion of Joseph Shepherd Munden) saw a piece of his own on the boards, a farce, "All's Fair in Love". In 1804, having submitted his fourteenth production, a romantic play in blank verse called 'The Honey Moon,' to the management at Drury Lane (it had failed to win acceptance at Covent Garden), he left his rooms near the Temple and went for his health to Cornwall. He then heard that "The Honey Moon" had been accepted; but in the meantime symptoms of consumption had manifested themselves. He was told that to save his life he must winter in the West Indies. He set sail accordingly on 7 December 1804, but died the first day out. The ship put back, and he was buried in the little churchyard of Cove, near Cork, where the remains of Charles Wolfe, author of the "Burial of Sir John Moore", were laid nineteen years later. Tobin was unmarried.

== Works ==
The Honey Moon was given at Drury Lane on 31 January 1805, with Elliston and Bannister in the leading rôles, and proved a decided success. It remained a favourite on the English stage for twenty years. Hazlitt thought the plot owed much to the Taming of the Shrew; John Genest detected reminiscences of Massinger and other Elizabethans. Tobin excelled at light comedies and stage lyrics. After his early death, his rejected pieces were sought after by managers.

Tobin's works, all posthumously published, were:

- 'The Honey Moon: a comedy' (five acts, mainly verse), London, 1805; New York, 1807; frequently reprinted, translated by Charles Nodier as 'La Lune de Miel' in 'Chefs d'œuvre des Théâtres Étrangers,' 1822.
- 'The Curfew: a play' (in five acts, prose and verse), London, 1807; 7th edit. 1807. It was produced at Drury Lane on 19 February 1807, and would have run longer than twenty nights but for Sheridan's anxiety to avoid the obligation of a benefit for Tobin's relatives.
- 'The School for Authors: a comedy' (in three acts, prose), London, 1808. Based on 'The Connoisseur,' one of Marmontel's tales; the part of Diaper, the sensitive author, afforded a triumph to Munden when he created the rôle at Covent Garden on 5 Dec. 1808.
- 'The Faro Table; or the Guardians: a comedy' London, 1816. This was given at Drury Lane on 5 November 1816, or nearly twenty years after it had been written, when the manners it satirises were already passing away; it was not a success.

Several of Tobin's unpublished dramas were published in one volume in 1820; among them 'The Gypsy of Madrid,' after the 'Gitanilla' of De Solis, 'The Indians,' and two light operas, 'Yours or Mine' and 'The Fisherman.' Among other pieces by him, apparently no longer extant, are mentioned 'The Reconciliation,' 'The Undertaker,' and 'Attraction.'
