= Marianne Chambers =

English playwright and novelist (fl. 1799–1812)

Marianne Chambers (fl. 1799–1811) was an English playwright.

In 1799 she published a novel, He Deceives Himself: A Domestic Tale in three volumes, which was favourably reviewed in The Gentleman's Magazine: "in its perusal we have received more pleasure and real satisfaction than from any work of its kind published for some years past". The author is described as "Daughter of the late Mr Charles Chambers, many Years in the Honorable East India Company's service, and unfortunately lost in the Winterton Indiaman".

She wrote two comedies, The School for Friends (first performed at Drury Lane Theatre on 10 December 1805) and Ourselves (first performed at The Lyceum on 2 March 1811). These were described as "critically acclaimed".

After the production of these two plays she is said to have "disappeared from public notice" and written no more.
