= 1803 in literature =

This article contains information about the literary events and publications of 1803.

== Events ==
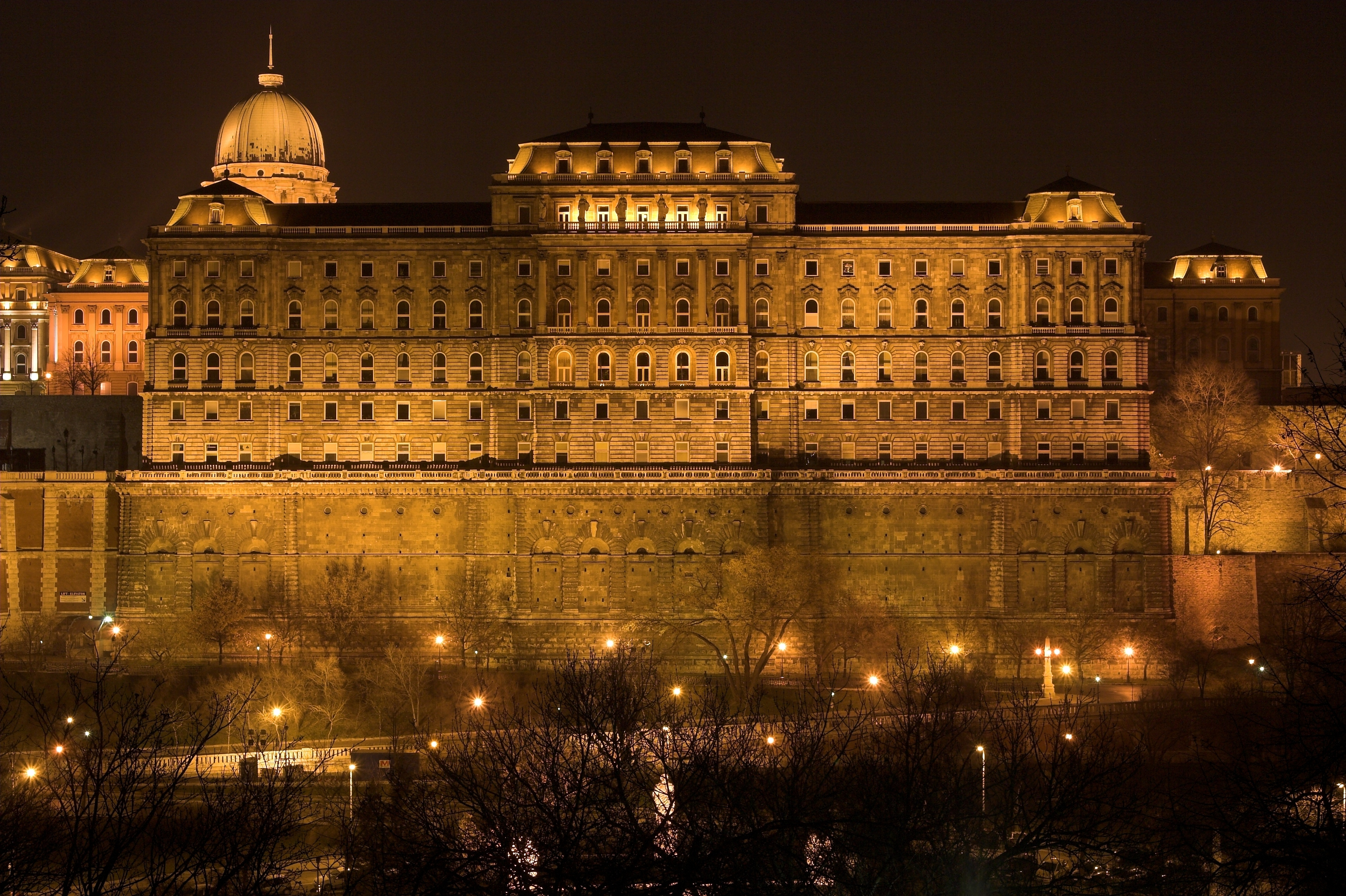
National Széchényi Library

- June 30 – Novelist Mary Butt marries her cousin, Captain Henry Sherwood, acquiring the surname by which she will become best known.
- September 9 – Bamberg State Library is established in Upper Franconia.
- unknown date – The library which becomes the National Széchényi Library, established in 1802 by Count Ferenc Széchényi, opens to the public in Pest, Hungary.
- Jane Austen's novel Northanger Abbey, a satire on Gothic fiction, is advertised by a London publisher but is not in fact published until 1817, after her death.

== New books ==
=== Fiction ===
- Charles Brockden Brown – Memoirs of Carwin the Biloquist
- Sophie Ristaud Cottin – Amélie de Mansfield
- Catherine Cuthbertson – The Romance of the Pyrenees
- Elizabeth Gunning – The War-Office
- Francis Lathom – The Mysterious Freebooter
- Mary Meeke – A Tale of Mystery, or Celina
- Jean Paul - Titan
- Jane Porter – Thaddeus of Warsaw
- Germaine de Staël – Margaret of Strafford

=== Drama ===
- John Allingham
  - Hearts of Oak
  - The Marriage Promise
- George Colman – John Bull
- William Dunlap – Voice of Nature (adapted from the French)
- Collin d'Harleville – Malice pour malice
- Thomas Holcroft – Hear Both Sides
- Heinrich von Kleist – Die Familie Schroffenstein
- August von Kotzebue – Die deutschen Kleinstädter (comedy, German Small-towners)
- Frederick Reynolds – The Three Per Cents
- Friedrich Schiller – The Bride of Messina (Die Braut von Messina), premiere in Weimar on March 19
- Isaac Reed (ed.) – The Plays of William Shakspeare (first variorum edition)

=== Poetry ===
- Henry Kirke White – Clifton Grove, a Sketch in Verse, with other Poems
- Adam Oehlenschlager – Digte (Poems)

=== Non-fiction ===
- Alexandre Balthazar Laurent Grimod de La Reynière – Almanach des Gourmands (1st edition)
- Bahadur Ali Hussaini – Akhlaq-e-Hindi, first Urdu book printed in printing-press (ethics)
- Immanuel Kant – Über Pädagogik (On Pedagogy)
- Adamantios Korais – Present Conditions of Civilisation in Greece
- Joseph Lancaster – Improvements in Education as It Respects the Industrious Classes
- Thomas Malthus – An Essay on the Principle of Population (2nd edition)
- Humphry Repton – Observations on the Theory and Practice of Landscape Gardening

== Births ==
- January 3 – Douglas William Jerrold, English dramatist (died 1857)
- January 15 – Marjorie Fleming, Scottish child writer (died 1811)
- January 27 – Eunice Hale Cobb, American writer, public speaker, and activist (died 1880)
- May 16 – Amelie von Strussenfelt, Swedish novelist (died 1847)
- May 25
  - Edward Bulwer-Lytton, 1st Baron Lytton, English novelist, poet and dramatist (died 1873)
  - Ralph Waldo Emerson, American poet, essayist and philosopher (died 1882)
- July 20 – Dudley Costello, Irish writer and journalist (died 1865)
- September 20 – Catherine Crowe, English novelist, playwright and children's writer (died 1876)
- September 28 – Prosper Mérimée, French dramatist and historian (died 1870)
- October 25 – Maria Doolaeghe, Flemish novelist (died 1884)
- November 14 – Jacob Abbott, American children's writer (died 1879)
- December 6 – Susanna Moodie, English-born Canadian writer (died 1885)
- December 31 – José María Heredia y Heredia, Cuban poet (died 1839)

Unknown date – Evan Bevan, Welsh writer of satirical verse (died 1866)

== Deaths ==
- January 1 – James Woodforde, English diarist (born 1740)
- February 11 – Jean-François de La Harpe, French dramatist and critic (born 1739)
- March 14 – Friedrich Gottlieb Klopstock, German poet (born 1724)
- April 9 – Mihály Bakos (Miháo Bakoš), Slovene hymnist and Lutheran minister (born c. 1742)
- June 12 – Richard François Philippe Brunck, French classical scholar (born 1729)
- August 2 – John Hoole, English translator (born 1727)
- September 5 – Pierre Choderlos de Laclos, French novelist (born 1841)
- October 8 – Vittorio Alfieri, Italian dramatist and poet (born 1749)
- December 18 – Johann Gottfried Herder, German philosopher, poet and critic (born 1744)
