= 1865 in literature =

This article contains information about the literary events and publications of 1865.

== Events ==
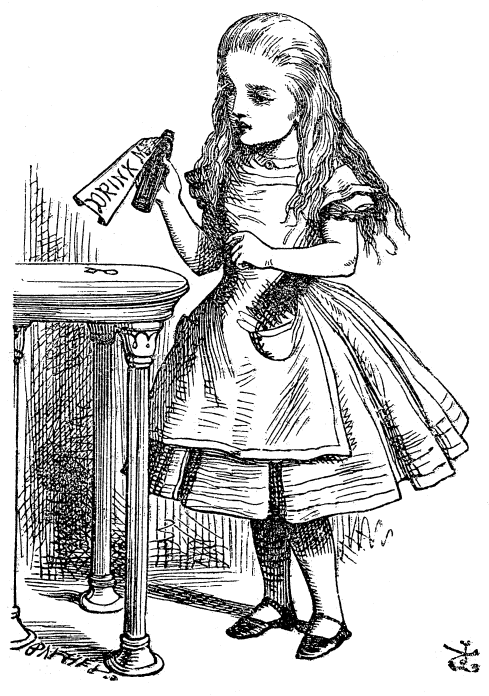
Alice in a Tenniel illustration from Alice's Adventures in Wonderland

- January – The first issue appears of Our Young Folks, an American monthly magazine for children produced by Ticknor and Fields in Boston. It is intended for a readership between the ages of ten and eighteen years. Each issue has an orange paper cover with a woodcut illustration of Minerva, the Roman goddess of poetry and wisdom. The magazine contains an average of 64 pages of illustrated short stories, articles, poems, songs and serialized stories.
- February – Publication of Leo Tolstoy's 1805, an early version of War and Peace, begins in the magazine Russkiy Vestnik.
- April 14 – Assassination of Abraham Lincoln: The President of the United States, Abraham Lincoln, is shot while attending a performance of Tom Taylor's farce Our American Cousin at Ford's Theatre in Washington, D.C., by actor and Confederate sympathizer John Wilkes Booth. Lincoln dies the following day.
- June 9 – Charles Dickens is caught in the Staplehurst rail crash in Kent, England, together with the actress Ellen Ternan and her mother Frances Eleanor Jarman. Dickens is deeply affected by the event for the rest of his life.
- June 14 – Karl May begins a four-year prison sentence for thefts and frauds at Osterstein Castle (Zwickau).
- July – The American magazine for children The Little Corporal first appears.
- July 4 – Lewis Carroll's children's book Alice's Adventures in Wonderland is published by Macmillan in London for Charles Lutwidge Dodgson (Carroll), three years after it was first narrated to Alice Liddell and her sisters. He and his illustrator, John Tenniel, withdraw this edition (printed in Oxford), and the first trade editions are published on November 26 and released in December (dated 1866), that published by Appleton in New York using the rejected sheets from the earlier printing.
- November 11 – London West End opening of the comedy drama Society written and directed by Thomas William Robertson at the Prince of Wales's Theatre, considered a milestone in English Victorian drama because of its realism in dialogue and performance.
- November 18 – Mark Twain's story "The Celebrated Jumping Frog of Calaveras County" is published in the New York weekly The Saturday Press in its original version as "Jim Smiley and His Jumping Frog".
- unknown dates
  - English writer Edwin Abbott Abbott becomes headmaster of the City of London School at the age of 26.
  - Frederick Warne & Co established as publishers in London.

== New books ==
=== Fiction ===
- William Harrison Ainsworth – The Spanish Match
- José de Alencar – Iracema
- R. M. Ballantyne – The Lighthouse
- Bankim Chandra Chattopadhyay – Durgeshnandini
- Annie Hall Cudlip – Theo Leigh
- Charles Dickens – Our Mutual Friend (publication concludes)
- Fyodor Dostoyevsky – "The Crocodile" («Крокодил», Krokodil, short story published in Epoch)
- Goncourt brothers – Germinie Lacerteux
- Charles Kingsley – Hereward the Wake
- Sheridan Le Fanu – Guy Deverell
- Nikolai Leskov – Lady Macbeth of the Mtsensk District («Леди Макбет Мценского уезда», novella published in Epoch January)
- George MacDonald – Alec Forbes of Howglen
- Francis Marrash – Ghābat al-ḥaqq (Forest of Truth)
- Robert Smith Surtees (died 1864) – Mr. Facey Romford's Hounds
- Anthony Trollope – Can You Forgive Her? (publication concludes) and "Miss Mackenzie"
- Jules Verne – From the Earth to the Moon (De la Terre à la Lune)
- Émile Zola – La Confession de Claude

=== Children and young people ===
- Wilhelm Busch – Max und Moritz
- Lewis Carroll – Alice's Adventures in Wonderland
- Mary Mapes Dodge – Hans Brinker, or The Silver Skates
- Jean Ingelow – Stories Told to a Child
- Mary Wright Sewell – Mother's Last Words: a ballad

=== Drama ===
- Francis Burnand – Windsor Castle
- Henry James Byron – War to the Knife
- Henrik Ibsen – Brand
- T. W. Robertson – Society
- Victorien Sardou – La Famille Benoîton

=== Poetry ===
- Edward Lear – The History of the Seven Families of the Lake Pipple-Popple
- A. C. Swinburne
  - Atalanta in Calydon
  - Chastelard: a tragedy

=== Non-fiction ===
- Annals of the Joseon Dynasty (final volume)
- Matthew Arnold – Essays in Criticism
- P. T. Barnum – The Humbugs of the World
- Jacob Grimm – Deutsche Sagen (German Sayings)
- Friedrich Albert Lange – History of Materialism and Critique of its Present Importance (Geschichte des Materialismus und Kritik seiner Bedeutung in der Gegenwart, published October dated 1866)
- Karl Marx – Value, Price and Profit (written as speech)
- John Stuart Mill – Examinations of Sir William Hamilton's Philosophy
- William Gifford Palgrave – Narrative of a Year's Journey through Central and Eastern Arabia
- James Hutchison Stirling – The Secret of Hegel: Being the Hegelian System in Origin Principle, Form and Matter
- James Hudson Taylor – China's Spiritual Need and Claims

== Births ==
- February 12 – Kazimierz Przerwa-Tetmajer, Polish poet and novelist (died 1940)
- February 21 – John Haden Badley, English educationalist and writer (died 1967)
- March 15 – Edith Maude Eaton (Sui-Sin Far), English-born writer on Chinese affairs (died 1914)
- March 20 – Arthur Bayldon, English-born Australian poet (died 1958)
- March 27 – Marion Angus, Scottish poet writing in Braid Scots and English (died 1946)
- March 28 – Mary Findlater, Scottish novelist (died 1963)
- March 29 – Stephen Bonsal, American writer, journalist and translator (died 1951)
- May 2 – Clyde Fitch, American playwright (died 1909)
- May 15 – Albert Verwey, Dutch poet (died 1937)
- June 13 – W. B. Yeats, Irish poet (died 1939)
- June 15 – Emma Wolf, American novelist (died 1932)
- June 20 – Enrico Corradini, Italian novelist and essayist (died 1931)
- June 26 – Bernard Berenson, American art historian (died 1959)
- July 21 – M. P. Shiel, born Matthew Phipps Shiell, Montserrat-born British fantasy fiction author (died 1947)
- August 14 – Pietro Gori, Italian anarchist poet (died 1911)
- August 26 – Ellen Marriage, English translator of Balzac (died 1946)
- September 11 – Rainis, Latvian poet and dramatist (died 1929)
- November 2 – Panuganti Lakshminarasimha Rao, Indian writer (died 1940)
- December 11 – Frida Stéenhoff, Swedish writer (died 1945)
- December 13 – Ángel Ganivet, Spanish writer (suicide 1898)
- December 30 – Rudyard Kipling, English poet and fiction writer (died 1936)

== Deaths ==
- January 11 – Jean-Baptiste-Antoine Ferland, French Canadian historian (born 1805)
- January 18 – Charles Greville, English diarist (born 1794)
- January 19 – Pierre-Joseph Proudhon, French philosopher (born 1809)
- January 21 – X. B. Saintine, French novelist and dramatist (born 1798)
- February 6 – Isabella Beeton, English writer on household management (born 1836)
- February 25 – Otto Ludwig, German novelist and playwright (born 1813)
- April 2
  - John Cassell, English publisher (born 1817)
  - Richard Cobden, English political writer (born 1804)
- April 10 – Shoqan Walikhanov, Russian Kazakh historian and folklorist (born 1835)
- April 13 – Theodosia Trollope, English-born writer (born 1816)
- April 15 – Abraham Lincoln, American orator and president of the republic (born 1809)
- May 14 – Pierre François Xavier de Ram, Belgian historian (born 1804)
- June 10 – Lydia Sigourney, American poet (born 1791)
- June 11 – Frederic Charles Lascelles Wraxall, English writer (born 1828)
- August 4 – William Edmondstoune Aytoun, Scottish poet and humorist (born 1813)
- September 29 – Richard Lower, English dialect poet (born 1782)
- September 30 – Dudley Costello, Irish writer and journalist (born 1803)
- November 12 – Elizabeth Gaskell, English novelist (born 1810)
- December 1 – Abraham Emanuel Fröhlich, Swiss poet (born 1796)
- December 3 – Joseph Marie Quérard, French bibliographer (born 1797)
- December 20 – Barton Bouchier, English religious writer (born 1794)

== Awards ==
- Newdigate Prize – Frederic Dobree Teesdale

== Notes ==
- Hahn, Daniel (2015). The Oxford Companion to Children's Literature (2nd ed.). Oxford. University Press. ISBN 9780198715542.
