= Sarah Sparks =

British stage actress (1754–1837)

Sarah Sparks (c. 1754 – 1837) was a British actress. She was born Sarah Mills into a theatrical family, although no evidence exists linking her to the earlier actors John Mills or his son William Mills. Her first known performance was in Berwick in 1773, and she was married to the actor Hugh Sparks by 1776. From 1776 to 1794, she was a regular at the Theatre Royal, Edinburgh with her husband, as well as appearing in Chester and Newcastle.

She came to London with her husband and acted together at the Theatre Royal, Drury Lane, making her first appearance in The Old Maid on 26 October 1797. For the next twenty three years she was one of the leading comedy players of the Drury Lane company. Her career success came as her husband's declined, and by 1818 she was earning ten pounds a week. Hugh died in 1816 and she continued acting until 1820 when she retired with a pension from Drury Lane in addition to an annuity given to her by her former fellow actress Harriet Mellon. She died in Farnham in 1837 and was described by The Observer as "an excellent woman, who was for many years one of the brightest ornaments of the national stage.

== Selected roles ==
- Clarissa in Lionel and Clarissa by Isaac Bickerstaffe (1774)
- Miss Harlow in The Old Maid by Arthur Murphy (1797)
- Leonella in Aurelio and Miranda by James Boaden (1798)
- Mrs Harvey in The Marriage Promise by John Allingham (1803)
- Mrs O'Bradleigh in Hearts of Oak by John Allingham (1803)
- Mrs Doublecharge in The Land We Live In by Francis Ludlow Holt (1804)
- Mrs Hartshorn in The Sailor's Daughter by Richard Cumberland (1804)
- Mrs Bustle in Where to Find a Friend by Richard Leigh (1811)
- Lady Anemone in First Impressions by Horatio Smith (1813)
- Camilla in Rugantino by Matthew Lewis (1820)

== Bibliography ==
- Highfill, Philip H, Burnim, Kalman A. & Langhans, Edward A. A Biographical Dictionary of Actors, Actresses, Musicians, Dancers, Managers and Other Stage Personnel in London, 1660-1800: Cabanel to Cory. SIU Press, 1975.
