= 1804 in literature =

This article contains information about the literary events and publications of 1804.

== Events ==
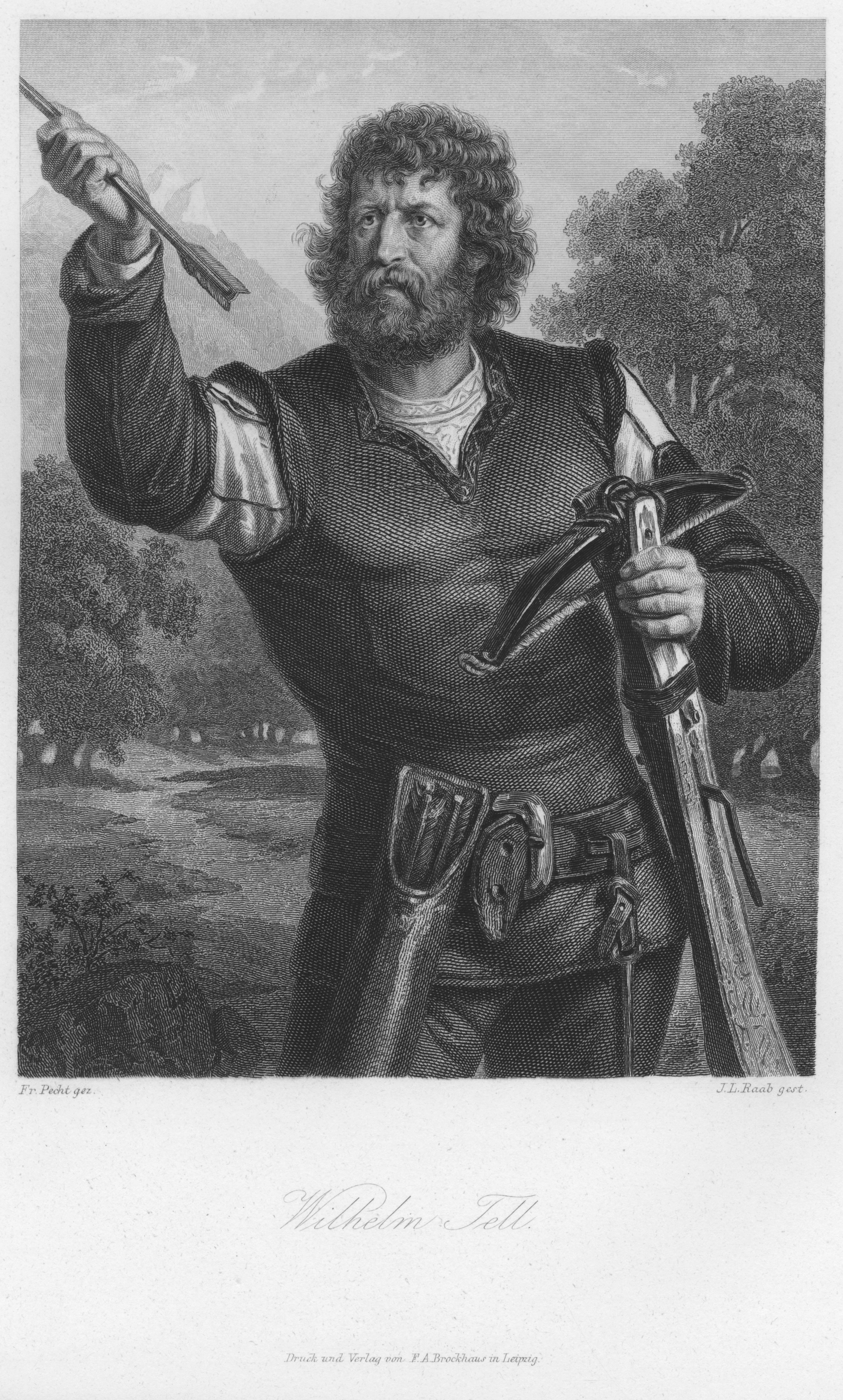
Illustration of William Tell by Friedrich Schiller. Depiction of the character William Tell; image from the Schiller Galerie; by Johann Leonhard Raab

- March 17 – The first performance of Friedrich Schiller's play William Tell takes place at Weimar under the direction of Johann Wolfgang von Goethe.
- April 4 – Samuel Taylor Coleridge sets sail on The Speedwell for the Mediterranean. In Malta, he obtains employment as Acting Public Secretary at Attard.
- April 15 – Thomas Keats (John Keats' father), a stable worker, dies of a fractured skull, after falling from his horse while returning from visiting John at school.
- unknown dates
  - James Mill's pamphlet critical of the corn trade, An Essay on the Impolicy of a Bounty on the Exportation of Grain, is published.
  - William Wordsworth writes his best-known poem "I Wandered Lonely as a Cloud", describing a scene he witnessed two years earlier.
  - German Gerhard Bonnier begins a publishing business in Copenhagen (Denmark) by issuing Underfulde og sandfærdige kriminalhistorier, origin of the Swedish Bonnier Group.

== New books ==
=== Fiction ===
- Mir Amman – Bagh o Buhar, a Translation into the Hindoostanee Tongue of the Celebrated Persian Tale "Qissui Chuhar Durwesh" "by Meer Ummun"
- Sophie Ristaud Cottin – Malvina
- Rachel Hunter -The Unexpected Legacy
- William Henry Ireland – The Sepulchral Summons
- Mary Meeke
  - Amazement
  - The Nine Days' Wonder
- Amelia Opie – Adeline Mowbray
- Ōta Nanpo (大田 南畝) and others – Shokusanjin ennyo meisekishu (Collection of Shokusanjin memorabilia)
- Anna Maria Porter – The Lake of Killarney

=== Children ===
- François Guillaume Ducray-Duminil
  - Elmonde, ou la Fille de l'hospice (Edmonde, the charity girl)
  - Jules, ou le Toit paternel (Jules, or Under his father's roof)
- Maria Edgeworth – Popular Tales
- Eliza Fenwick – Mary and Her Cat
- Ann Taylor and Jane Taylor – Original Poems for Infant Minds by several young persons, Vol. 1

=== Drama ===
- Richard Cumberland – The Sailor's Daughter
- Thomas Dibdin
  - Guilty or Not Guilty
  - The Will for the Deed
- Francis Ludlow Holt – The Land We Live In
- Frederick Reynolds – The Blind Bargain
- Friedrich von Schiller – Wilhelm Tell
- Friedrich Hölderlin – translations of the dramas of Sophocles (published)

=== Poetry ===
- William Blake – Jerusalem: The Emanation of the Giant Albion
- William Lisle Bowles – The Spirit of Discovery
- Kirsha Danilov – The Ancient Russian Poems

=== Non-fiction ===
- Thomas Brown – Inquiry into the Relation of Cause and Effect
- John Wilson Croker – Familiar Epistles to J. F. Jones, Esquire, on the State of the Irish Stage
- Jakob Friedrich Fries – System der Philosophie als evidente Wissenschaft
- Jacques Labillardière – Novae Hollandiae Plantarum Specimen
- James Maitland, 8th Earl of Lauderdale – Inquiry into the Nature and Origin of Public Wealth

== Births ==
- July 1 – George Sand (Lucile Aurore Dupin), French novelist and memoirist (died 1876)
- July 4 – Nathaniel Hawthorne, American novelist (died 1864)
- August 8 – Countess Dash, French writer (died 1872)
- September 8 – Eduard Mörike, German poet (died 1875)
- November 6 – Benjamin Hall Kennedy, English classicist (died 1880)
- December 10 – Eugène Sue, French novelist (died 1857)
- December 21 – Benjamin Disraeli, English novelist and prime minister (died 1881)

== Deaths ==
- January 4 – Charlotte Lennox, English novelist and playwright (born c. 1730)
- January 11 – James Tytler, Scottish American editor of Encyclopædia Britannica (born 1745)
- February 6 – Joseph Priestley, English natural philosopher and theologian (born 1733)
- February 12 – Immanuel Kant, German philosopher (born 1724)
- February 19 – Philip Yorke, Welsh antiquary and genealogist (born 1743)
- April 3 – Jędrzej Kitowicz, Polish historian and diarist (born c. 1727)
- April 27 – Jonathan Boucher, English philologist (born 1738)
- May 3 – Celestyn Czaplic, Polish poet and politician (born 1723)
- July 16 – Jean-Louis de Lolme, Swiss political theorist (born 1741)
- August 9 – Robert Potter, English translator, poet and cleric (born 1721)
- August 13 – Anica Bošković, Ragusan writer (born 1714)
- October 30 – Samuel Ayscough, English librarian and indexer (born 1745)
- November 5 – Betje Wolff, Dutch novelist (born 1738)
- November 23 – Richard Graves, English poet and novelist (born 1715)
- December 9 – Wilhelm Abraham Teller, German theologian (born 1734)
- December – John Boydell, English Shakespeare illustrator and engraver (born 1720)
