= The Taming of the Shrew in performance =

Performance history of The Taming of the Shrew

The Taming of the Shrew in performance has had an uneven history. Popular in Shakespeare's day, the play fell out of favour during the seventeenth century, when it was replaced on the stage by John Lacy's Sauny the Scott. The original Shakespearean text was not performed at all during the eighteenth century, with David Garrick's adaptation Catharine and Petruchio dominating the stage. After over two hundred years without a performance, the play returned to the British stage in 1844, the last Shakespeare play restored to the repertory. However, it was only in the 1890s that the dominance of Catharine and Petruchio began to wane, and productions of The Shrew become more regular. Moving into the twentieth century, the play's popularity increased considerably, and it became one of Shakespeare's most frequently staged plays, with productions taking place all over the world. This trend has continued into the twenty-first century, with the play as popular now as it was when first written.

== Performance history ==
=== Pre 20th century ===
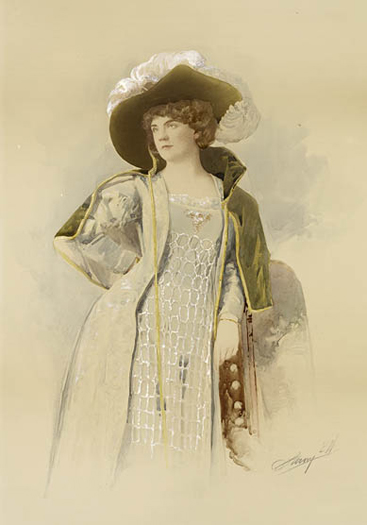
Ada Rehan as Katherina in Augustin Daly's 1887 production at Daly's Theatre, New York.

The earliest known performance of the play is recorded in Philip Henslowe's diary on 11 June 1594, performed by the Lord Admiral's Men and the Lord Chamberlain's Men at Newington Butts Theatre; "begininge at newing ton my Lord Admeralle men & my Lorde chamberlen men as ffolowethe [...] 11 of June 1594 Rd at the tamynge of A Shrowe." This could have been either A Shrew or The Shrew, but as the Lord Chamberlain's Men were sharing the theatre at the time, and as such Shakespeare himself would have been there, scholars tend to assume it was The Shrew. The earliest definite performance of The Shrew was at court before Charles I and Henrietta Maria on 26 November 1633, where it was described as being "likt".

Aside from the court performance, evidence of the play's stage history during the seventeenth century is relatively sparse. The title page of the 1631 quarto states the play had been acted by the King's Men at both the Globe and Blackfriars. The King's Men only began performing at Blackfriars in 1610, suggesting the play was still popular enough to be performed at least sixteen years after its debut. However, there is no further information available. Apart from a possible production at Drury Lane in 1663 or 1664, the play's place on the stage was taken by John Lacy's adaptation, Sauny the Scot at some point during the seventeenth century. The original play seems not to have been performed at all during the eighteenth century, and instead a range of adaptations held the stage, most notably David Garrick's 1754 adaptation, Catharine and Petruchio.

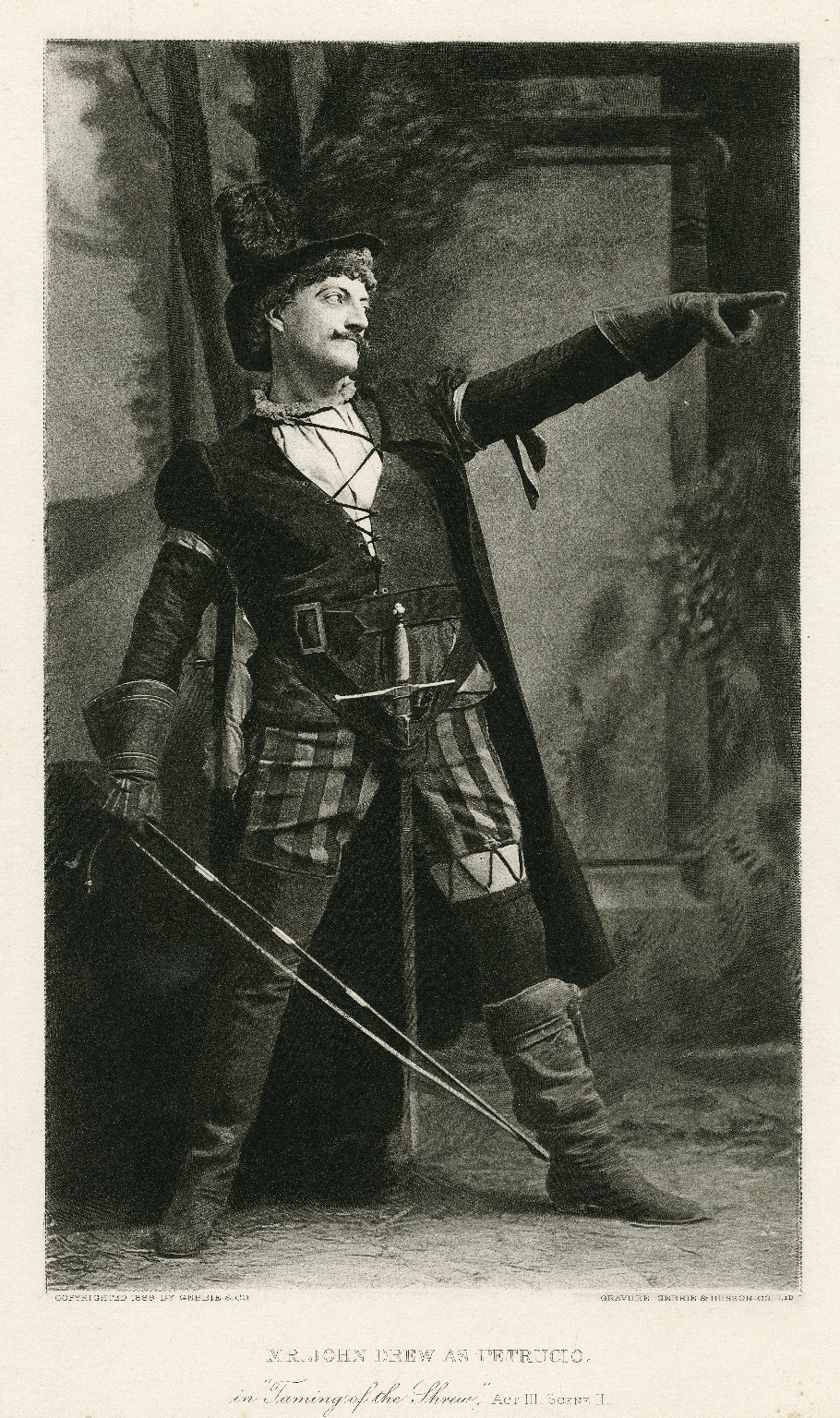
John Drew as Petruchio in Augustin Daly's production at Daly's Theatre, New York (1888).

Shakespeare's The Shrew was not performed again until 1844, the last of his plays restored to the repertory, 211 years after the last definite performance. That year, Benjamin Webster directed a production designed by J.R. Planché at the Haymarket Theatre. Starring Louisa Cranstoun Nisbett as Katherina and Webster himself as Petruchio, the production was staged in a minimalist Elizabethan manner, with only two simple locations; the outside of the alehouse, and the Lord's chamber in which the play is staged for Christopher Sly. The Induction was included in full, with Sly remaining at the front of the stage after Act 1, Scene 1, and slowly falling asleep over the course of the play. At the end, as the final curtain falls, the Lord's attendants came and carried him off-stage. Planché referred to his role in returning the play to the stage as "one of the events in my theatrical career on which I look back with greatest pride and gratification." The play received mixed reviews, with many criticising Webster's performance, and accusing the production of being overly bawdy, but it was a box office success and was revived in 1847.

Despite the financial success of Webster and Planché's production, Catharine and Petruchio continued to dominate the stage, and it was not until 1856 that Shakespeare's text was performed again, in a production directed by Samuel Phelps at Sadler's Wells, starring Emma Atkinson and Henry Marston. Phelpes himself played the role of Sly to general critical acclaim. In this production, Sly was carried off-stage at the end of Act 1, and although Phelps stuck to the First Folio text throughout the play, he "much abbreviated" Katherina's final speech.

In the United States, Shakespeare's The Shrew was first performed in 1887, directed by Augustin Daly at Daly's Theatre in New York, starring Ada Rehan and John Drew. Despite claims the production was pure Shakespeare, Daly made several alterations. For example, the Bianca subplot was heavily cut to allow more focus on the taming storyline. Daly also reorganised Act 4 so that Scene 2 (the arrival of the pedant in Padua) was followed by Scene 4 (the pedant confirms the dowry for Bianca), and Scene 1 (Petruchio and Katherina arriving at his house), Scene 3 (Petruchio begins taming Katherina) and Scene 5 (Petruchio and Katherina set out for Padua) formed one continuous sequence. He also included several snippets from Garrick, such as Katherina threatening to tame Petruchio in Act 2, Scene 1, and he edited Katherina's final speech in the same manner as Garrick. Another significant alteration was the omission of Katherina from Act 1, Scene 1. As such, the audience was not introduced to her in a crowded street scene where she is spoken of as if she is not present, but instead first meets her in Act 2, Scene 1, after she has tied Bianca's hands together. Critics praised this alteration, feeling it was a more explosive introduction to the character. The production was hugely successful and ran for 121 performances. It subsequently toured internationally and was performed to critical acclaim at the Gaiety Theatre, London in March 1888 and the Shakespeare Memorial Theatre in August. It was also chosen as the inaugural performance at Daly's Theatre in London on 12 March 1893. Most critics consider the success of Daly's production as critical in breaking the dominance of Catharine and Petruchio on both sides of the Atlantic. Additionally, Rehan's performance is generally acknowledged as one of the finest depictions of Katherina ever seen. Elizabeth Schafer writes "Ada Rehan's Katherina was to haunt her successors, who were always found wanting alongside the fiery, imperious character she created." So popular was she in the role, that she continued to play it until 1905.

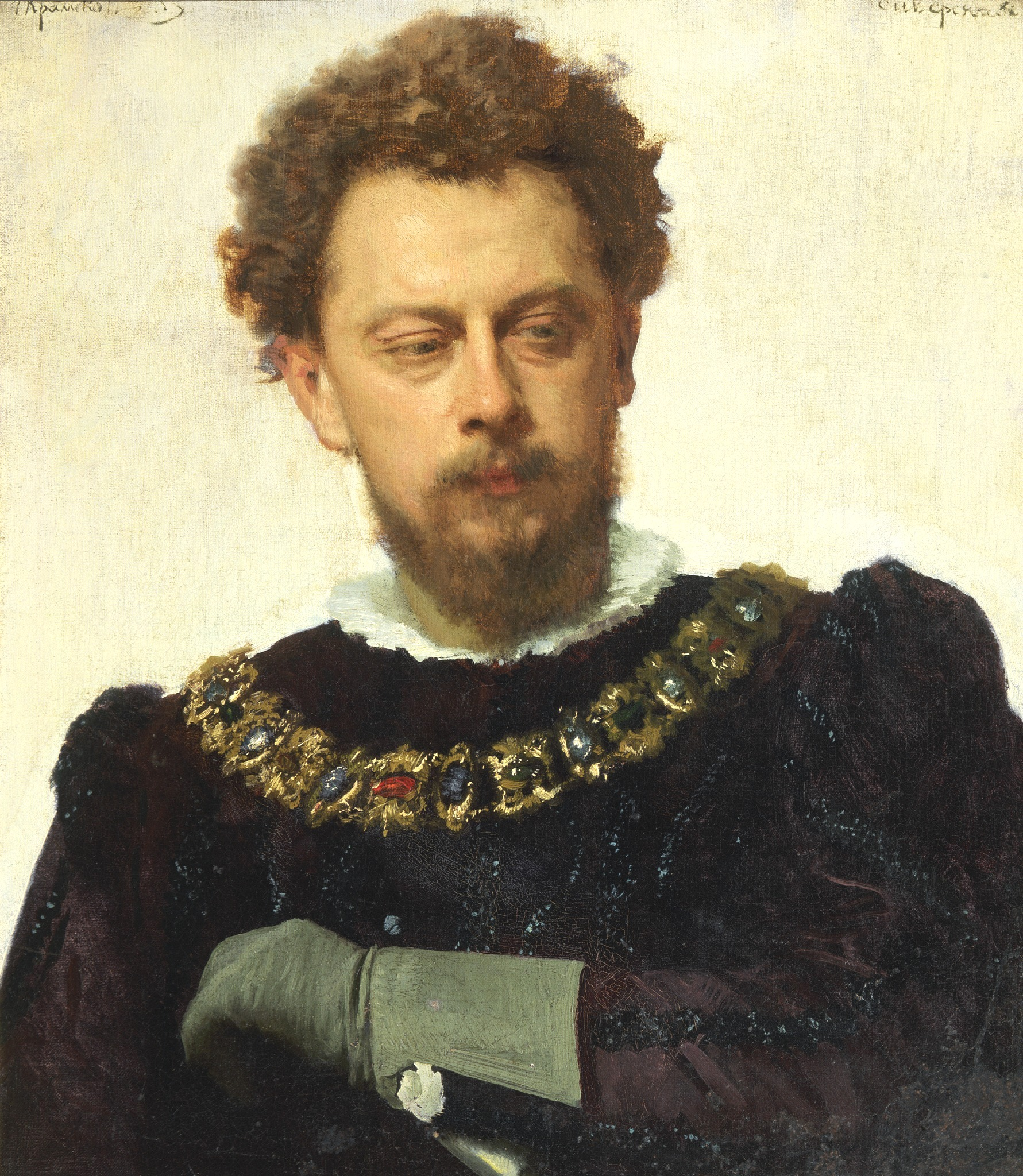
Aleksandr Pavlovich Lensky as Petruchio by Ivan Kramskoi (1883).

The first major production in England after Daly's success was that of F.R. Benson. Originally performed in the Prince's Theatre, Manchester in 1889, the production then moved to the Adelphi Theatre in London in 1890, before settling at the Shakespeare Memorial Theatre in 1893, where it became one of the most popular and often performed plays in Benson's repertory. The play was regularly performed there until the 1920s and was revived at theatres around the country up to 1932. Starring Benson's wife, Constance Benson and Benson himself as Petruchio, Benson followed Daly's example in rewriting and restructuring, such as truncating the Bianca subplot. Unlike Daly, however, Benson also removed the Induction. The production was very much a farce, with the emphasis on broad physical comedy in which Petruchio athletically leaps about the stage terrorizing a relatively passive Katherina. In its early days, it received generally strong reviews, but by 1910, the political climate had changed somewhat; the 1909 Stratford by-election had seen suffragette protests, and henceforth some critics expressed discomfort with Benson's use of farce to depict what had now become a socially relevant situation. Indeed, in the 1912 season, suffragette activist Violet Vanbrugh replaced Constance Benson in the role of Katherina, although her performance was roundly criticised for failing to bring the anticipated political edge to the character.

=== Early 20th century ===
Another husband and wife team who had a long and successful run with the play was Oscar Asche and Lily Brayton. First staged in 1899 in the Theatre Royal in Wigan, the play became more prominent when performed at the Adelphi in 1904, directed by Otho Stuart. It subsequently went on a world tour, beginning in Australia, and Asche estimates it was performed about 1,500 times all over the world. Although a financial success, the production received mixed reviews. Many critics commented on the size difference between the large and imposing Asche and the diminutive Brayton, feeling the disparity lent the production an uncomfortable tone, especially insofar as Asche rejected Benson's farcical production in favour of a more psychologically real representation.

In the wake of the success of the Daly, Benson and Asche productions, the play began to be performed with much more frequency all over the world. A celebrated early twentieth-century Katherina was Margaret Anglin, who first performed the role in 1908 in Her Majesty's Theatre, Melbourne. Acting opposite Henry Kolker in a production she herself directed, Anglin is generally regarded as the first actress to have performed Katherina's final speech in an ironic manner. The play was a huge success in Australia, and in 1914, Anglin brought it on tour to New York. Of the last scene, Anglin wrote "when I run gaily in to do my lord's bidding in the last act, I do it with a twinkle in my eye. I don't play it as Shakespeare wrote that last scene." In a 1909 Max Reinhardt directed production at the Deutsches Theater in Berlin, starring Lucie Höflich and Albert Bassermann, the Induction was emphasised and the play was presented as a commedia dell'arte style farce, to the point of the male leads literally wearing clown costumes.

In 1913, Martin Harvey, in collaboration with William Poel, directed a production at the Prince of Wales Theatre. Starring Harvey's wife Nina de Silva and Harvey himself as Petruchio, the production was very much in the style of Poel's own minimalist and authentically Elizabethan productions. Harvey kept Sly on stage throughout, however, in a unique move, he neither incorporated text from A Shrew nor did he have Sly lose interest and fall asleep. Instead, Sly explicitly reacts to the play – laughing at certain points, attempting to climb onto the stage during the wedding before being restrained by his 'wife', and finally succeeding in getting onto the stage later in the play, at which point he shook Petruchio's hand and then introduced himself to Katherina (albeit without dialogue). In an "extremely conventional production" at the Shakespeare Memorial Theatre in 1919, starring Ethel Warwick and Edmund Willard, William Bridges-Adams stuck rigidly to the First Folio text, but completely removed the Induction and all references to Sly.

In a 1922 production at The Old Vic starring Florence Buckton and Rupert Harvey, director Robert Atkins was the first to graft the A Shrew epilogue onto a performance of The Shrew, with Hay Petrie playing Sly. In 1927, H.K. Ayliff directed a modern dress production at the Garrick Theatre in New York, with Mary Ellis and Basil Sydney. At the time, modern dress productions were still rare enough to elicit a great deal of attention, and the production ran for 175 performances, a record for the theatre at the time. The production was remounted in England in 1928, first at the Birmingham Repertory Theatre, and subsequently at the Royal Court Theatre, starring Eileen Beldon and Scott Sunderland. In this production, the Induction was kept, with Sly moving from the front of the stage to one of the boxes after the first act. Barry Jackson, who co-directed the Birmingham performances, was initially keen to use the epilogue from A Shrew, but he ultimately decided against it "because the actual words in the old edition are so corrupt as to be illiterate." In a 1935 production starring Catherine Lacey and Neil Porter, director Ben Iden Payne became the first to use the A Shrew epilogue in a performance of The Shrew at the Shakespeare Memorial Theatre, with Roy Byford initially playing Sly, followed by Jay Laurier. Both actors received excellent reviews for their performances.

The most successful early-twentieth-century staging was the 1935/1936 Theatre Guild production, which began on Broadway and subsequently toured all over North America. Starring husband and wife Alfred Lunt and Lynn Fontanne, the show ran for a record 129 performances, and was remounted in 1940 as a fundraiser for the Finnish Relief Fund. Ostensibly directed by Harry Wagstaff Gribble, the production notes indicated that Lunt and Fontanne were responsible for the "scheme of the production," which most people took to mean they were the real directors. Presented as a rollicking farce involving circus animals, dwarfs, acrobats and clowns, the performers would often involve the audience in the play; latecomers would be heckled by the actors on some nights, whilst on others, the actors would stop the play to politely explain to the latecomers what they had missed. Any particularly loud coughing in the audience would often lead to the entire cast breaking into a fit of coughing. At the end of the play, Katherina and Petruchio ascended into the heavens in a golden chariot, accompanied by choral music. To enhance Katherina's fiery reputation, the production kept her offstage during Act 1, Scene 1. However, none of her lines were cut. Instead, they were all shouted from offstage and were often accompanied by her flinging objects at the on-stage performers. The fight with Petruchio was also commented upon by many reviewers as being extremely physical. Lunt and Fontanne were the most famous celebrity couple of the time, and their backstage fights were rumoured to be just as ferocious as their on-stage performances. So legendary did the tempestuous reputation of the couple become that Cole Porter's 1948 musical Kiss Me, Kate, about a fiery couple attempting to stage an adaptation of The Taming of the Shrew, was based on their real-life antics.

=== Mid to late 20th century ===
In the latter half of the twentieth century, the play has been frequently staged all over the world. Some notable productions include:

- Michael Benthall's 1948 Shakespeare Memorial Theatre production, starring Diana Wynyard and Anthony Quayle. This production is as well known for what it did not achieve as what it did. Benthall originally wanted to do an all-male version of the play, with Robert Helpmann playing Katherina. The theatre governors were so unimpressed with the idea, they fired Barry Jackson from his position as artistic director for not dismissing Benthall's idea out of hand immediately.
- George Devine's 1953 Shakespeare Memorial Theatre production, starring Yvonne Mitchell and Marius Goring. This production is regarded by some as the first to use the Sly character as more than a vehicle to elicit laughter from his reactions to the taming.
- Michael Benthall's 1955 Old Vic production, starring Katharine Hepburn and Robert Helpmann. Benthall had failed to cast Helpmann as Katherina in 1948, but in 1955, he cast him as Petruchio in a production noted for excess; Katherina is literally hung upside-down from the rafters, she beats Petruchio with a slipper, he spends much of the play leaping over furniture and brandishing his whip. After a successful run at the Old Vic, the play went on tour to Australia.
- John Barton's 1960 Shakespeare Memorial Theatre production, starring Peggy Ashcroft and Peter O'Toole, with Jack MacGowran as Sly. This production highlighted meta-theatricality by using a revolving set, which occasionally gave the audience glimpses of the actors backstage, changing costumes and consulting scripts. Barton's production included an Induction featuring material from both A Shrew and The Shrew, as well as the epilogue from A Shrew, and additional material for Sly written by Barton himself. For example, when Vincentio is about to be arrested, Sly ran onstage in disgust and had to be dragged away. This 'unexpected' disruption left the performers stunned, and the actors required prompting so as to continue with the performance. The production was seen by many critics as politically very conservative, with Katherina's final speech delivered sincerely. The Evening Standard called it "a complete and uncompromising anti-feminist version [in which] women's suffrage suffers a considerable beating in the completeness of Katherina's capitulation." In a controversial review, Kenneth Tynan wrote Ashcroft delivered the final speech "with an eager, sensible radiance that almost prompts one to regret the triumph of the suffragette movement." Controversy also encapsulated the fact that Ashcroft was twenty-five years older than O'Toole, and that O'Toole had a reputation in real life for being a hell-raiser not entirely dissimilar to Petruchio. Nevertheless, it was a huge financial success.
- Trevor Nunn's 1967 Royal Shakespeare Company (RSC) production at the Royal Shakespeare Theatre (formerly the Shakespeare Memorial Theatre), starring Michael Williams and Janet Suzman, with W. Morgan Sheppard as Sly. The poster for this production displayed a wooden door painted on which was "RSC IN THE TAMING OF ~~the~~ ~~a~~ THE SHREW." Nunn was heavily influenced by Barton's production, keeping the revolving set and also having Sly attempt to intervene during Vincentio's arrest. This production also featured the epilogue from A Shrew.
- Frank Dunlop's 1970 Young Vic production starred Jim Dale and Jane Lapotaire. Clive Barnes, reviewing the production when it was presented at the Brooklyn Academy of Music in 1974, described Dale as an "unusually openhearted and sincere Petruchio. Instead of the customary buckler of swashes, Mr. Dale is simply the firm‐minded boy who lives next door and wants his dinner on the table on time. But there is a generous radiance to his personality that is charming, and his comic timing, his freedom with the audience, and his confidence in his presence, are totally disarming." The BAM run featured Ian Charleson as Lucentio and Richard Gere (the only American in the cast) as Christopher Sly.
- Jonathan Miller's 1972 Chichester Festival Theatre production, starring Joan Plowright and Anthony Hopkins. This production did away with the Induction and presented the play as a realistic social comedy, set in an historical context which explored the Puritan concept of marriage. Plowright played Katherina as a spoiled, psychologically disturbed child in need of Petruchio's harsh, but effective therapy. In 1980, Miller adapted this production for BBC television's Shakespeare series in 1980, starring John Cleese and Sarah Badel
- Robin Lovejoy's 1972 Old Tote Theatre Company production at the Drama Theatre of the Sydney Opera House, starring Carol Macready and John Bell, with Martin Vaughan as Sly. Relocated to an unspecified town in New South Wales at the turn of the twentieth century, Katherina is a frustrated feminist writer and Petruchio is a soldier back from the Boer War. The production was a huge box office success, and subsequently went on a national tour. In 1973, it was screened on Australian television.
- Clifford Williams' 1973 RSC production at the Royal Shakespeare Theatre, starring Susan Fleetwood and Alan Bates, with Sydney Bromley as Sly. This production began by using slides projected onto the rear of the stage explaining that in 1593, the London theatres were closed due to an outbreak of plague, and playing companies were forced to tour the provinces, often unsuccessfully. The play then used a newly written version of the Induction, which omitted the Lord and the practical joke. A playing company is trying to find shelter on a rain-swept night and set up camp in a ditch, where they find Sly also sheltering. Glad of an audience, they offer to present a play for him. The production was noted for the contrast between the darkness of the opening, and the vibrancy of the play-within-the-play.
- William Ball's 1976 American Conservatory Theater production, starring Fredi Olster and Marc Singer. This celebrated production was grounded very much in commedia dell'arte, with acrobats, clowns, pantomime-style violence, over-the-top posturing (Petruchio is depicted shirtless for almost the entire performance), much highly choreographed physicality on the part of the two leads, and an on-stage audience of clowns who provided on-going sound-effects, such as drums for punches and whistles for people fainting. This production dropped Sly altogether. Katherina's final speech is delivered in an ironic manner, with Olster winking at the audience, before grabbing a confused Petruchio and kissing him passionately. The production was broadcast by PBS in 1976 as part of their Great Performances series, with the TV presentation directed by Kirk Browning.
- Michael Bogdanov's 1978 RSC production at the Aldwych Theatre, starring Jonathan Pryce and Paola Dionisotti. In this modern dress production, after the house lights went down, nothing happened on stage for a moment. Then, a commotion arose from within the audience. The house lights came back on, and a member of the audience (Pryce) is seen to be in an altercation with an usherette (Dionisotti). After pushing the usherette to the ground, the man then clambered onto the stage, and began to smash parts of the set before being restrained by the usherette and theatre staff, stripped and thrown into a bath. The subsequent play was then presented as his dream. At several performances of the play, audience members were duped into thinking the fight between the man and the usherette was real, and several times, other audience members attempted to intervene in the conflict. This production very much embraced a feminist reading of the play, presenting the taming as a distasteful display of male chauvinism, with the process presented as Sly's dream of male domination and power over the usherette who had restrained him. In this version, Katherina delivers the final speech (with the men sitting not at a dining table but a poker table) in a toneless, lifeless voice, and although Petruchio appeared thoroughly ashamed of what he had done to her, he still collected his winnings from the other men before leaving. Dionisotti's own feelings about her delivery of the speech was that it was "full of affection for women." She also felt the production had a very bleak ending; "the last image was of two very lonely people. The lights went down as we left - I following him, the others hardly noticing we'd gone. They'd got down to some hard gambling. They just closed ranks around the green baize table." Michael Billington was especially complementary, praising Bogdanov for the honesty shown in "his approach to this barbaric and disgusting play [...] Instead of softening its harsh edges like most recent directors, he has chosen to emphasise its moral and physical ugliness." Graham Holderness argues of this production, "Bogdanov was concerned to stress the continuities between the mercantile ethics of Renaissance Padua and the commercial values of modern-day British capitalism; between the oppression of women in Shakespeare's time, and the continuing exploitation of sex today; between the class-divisions of the sixteenth century and the economic inequality of the twentieth."
- Wilford Leach's 1978 Delacorte Theater production for the New York Shakespeare Festival, starring Meryl Streep and Raúl Juliá. In this semi-farcical production, which mixed modern dress with Elizabethan clothing, Katherina was very much a match for Petruchio, and after apparently delivering her final speech with sincerity, she subsequently embarrassed him by leaving the dining hall alone. A documentary about the production, presented by Joseph Papp, titled Kiss Me, Petruchio, aired on BBC2 in 1979, PBS in 1981, and was subsequently released on home video.
- Jonathan Miller's 1987 RSC production at the Royal Shakespeare Theatre, starring Fiona Shaw and Brian Cox. This production was essentially a re-mounting of Miller's 1980 BBC Television Shakespeare production, which itself had been a re-mounting of his 1972 Chichester Festival Theatre production. All three productions removed the Induction and presented the play as a realistic comedy, set in an historical context. All three productions presented a Puritanical Petruchio and a spoiled, psychologically disturbed childlike Katherina, in need of Petruchio's treatment to make her see the error of her ways. All three productions had the final speech delivered sincerely and in both the BBC production and the RSC production, the play ended with the group singing a Puritan hymn.
- A.J. Antoon's 1990 Delacorte Theater production for the New York Shakespeare Festival, starring Tracey Ullman and Morgan Freeman. This production was set in the old west, with Petruchio depicted as a cowboy who rides into a small frontier town and is charged with taming Katherina, daughter of the largest landowner in the district, and a noted sharpshooter, as she demonstrates at one point by shooting balloons affixed to her terrified sister.
- Bill Alexander's 1992 RSC production at the Swan Theatre, starring Amanda Harris and Anton Lesser, with Maxwell Hutcheon as Sly. Originally a small-scale touring production starring Naomi Wirthner and Gerard Murphy, with Jim Hooper as Sly, the touring production proved popular enough to warrant a revival in 1992. In the touring production, "Lord Simon's hunting party" is composed of four men and three women, who are depicted as representatives of modern Britain's upper class. The Induction was rewritten in modern language, and the play-within-the-play featured the actors often having to consult their scripts and continually forgetting lines. In the 1992 production, the same basic form of Induction was kept.

Petruchio (Michael Siberry) and Grumio (Robin Nedwell) arrive for Petruchio's wedding in Gale Edwards' 1995 RSC production at the Royal Shakespeare Theatre.

- Gale Edwards' 1995 RSC production at the Royal Shakespeare Theatre, starring Josie Lawrence and Michael Siberry. Edwards was the first woman to direct the play at the Royal Shakespeare Theatre, and for this reason alone, it received a great deal of attention. The play opens on a stormy night, with a woman (played by Lawrence) dressed in rags trying to get her drunk husband (played by Siberry) to come home. He refuses and falls asleep outside the tavern. As with the Bogdanov production, the taming story was then presented as Sly's dream. However, in Edwards, it was set in a surreal landscape, with the characters sporting a bizarre mixture of costumes; Elizabethan, commedia dell'arte, pantomime, Victorian, Edwardian, and modern dress. At the end of Katherina's speech (which was delivered lovingly until she realised she was part of a wager, at which point she began to speak angrily, and by the end, Petruchio had become bowed with shame), the text was cut and at this point, the play returned to the Induction setting. Sly, having been deeply moved by his dream, condemns the subjugation of women and embraces his wife, whose love he now appreciates for the first time in his life. The production notes say of Katherina's speech; "Petruchio slowly realises what he has been attempting to do to Katherina in the name of love. By the end of the speech, his dream has become his nightmare." Speaking of the correlation between Sly and Petruchio, Siberry stated that Petruchio becomes "sobered and then shamed" during the speech, whilst Sly releases "that his behavior has become unacceptable." As the play ends with a kneeling Sly embracing his standing wife, Siberry argues that Sly "is trying to make some sense of what had happened, understanding that he has made an awful mistake and trying to come to terms with it." The production ended ambiguously, however, with no indication as to whether Sly's wife would forgive him.

=== 21st century ===
The Shrew's popularity on stage has continued into the twenty-first century. Some notable productions include:

- Phyllida Lloyd's 2003 production at Shakespeare's Globe, with an all female cast, starring Kathryn Hunter as Katherina and Janet McTeer as Petruchio. The production emphasised the physicality of both the comedy and the taming, with McTeer's Petruchio a commanding and domineering figure alongside Hunter's shrinking waif-like Katherina. Katherina's final speech was played in an unusual way. The speech was broken up into separate "beats", with Hunter playing each beat up to a false ending (to the relief of the 'men') only to begin the next beat immediately afterwards (much to the chagrin of the 'men'). At the end of the speech, the three giggling wives all flung themselves at their husband's feet. At the end of the play, when the main stage had cleared, Katherina and Petruchio appeared as silhouettes on the upper stage in the throes of a huge argument. The production received mixed reviews, with many feeling it was unable to decide if it was a farce or a feminist statement, and ultimately ended up being neither.
- Gregory Doran's 2003 RSC production at the Royal Shakespeare Theatre, starring Alexandra Gilbreath and Jasper Britton. This production was presented with Fletcher's The Tamer Tamed as a two-part piece, with Gilbreath also playing Maria, Petruchio's second wife, in Tamer Tamed. This was the first recorded production of Shrew and Tamer Tamed as a two-piece since the seventeenth century. The play subsequently moved to the John F. Kennedy Center for the Performing Arts. Britton played Petruchio not as a swaggering bully but as a shy and somewhat insecure individual deeply saddened by his father's death. When he first meets Katherina, she is in turmoil regarding the recent actions of her own father, and they recognise a kindred psychology in one another. Michael Billington wrote of the first meeting, "I have never seen the scene more breathtakingly played: instead of barbaric knockabout, we see a damaged couple finding mutual support [...] in place of an offensive comedy about "curative" wife-taming, we see Kate trying to rescue a madman she genuinely loves." Doran himself said of the play "This is a play about love between two misfits, about their private relationship versus their public carapaces." As such, Katherina here delivered her final speech with warmth and real affection for Petruchio, who admired her throughout. When she was finished, he emptied his bag of gold onto the table and left the room with Katherina, not the gold.
- Edward Hall's 2006 Propeller Company touring production, presented in the Courtyard Theatre as part of the RSC's presentation of the Complete Works, featuring an all-male cast, and starring Simon Scardifield as Katherina and Dugald Bruce Lockhart as Petruchio. This production emphasised the physical brutality of the taming, with a macho Lockhart often aggressively lashing out at Scardifield, who began as a punk rebel, but who became less and less assertive as the play went on. Katherina's final speech was delivered in a manner suggesting she was terrified of disagreeing with Petruchio.
- Conall Morrison's 2008 RSC production at the Novello Theatre, starring Michelle Gomez and Stephen Boxer, which included a modern-day Induction, which begins in a strip club. Sly (played by Boxer) is ejected for being drunk and falls asleep in a trash can until a groups of "luvvies" arrive in a van and dupe him into acting out his misogynistic fantasies. The production emphasized both the farcical elements of the play and the erotic possibilities. Katherina's final speech was delivered in a robotic manner, suggesting she had been totally broken by Petruchio. The production received some extremely varied reviews, with critics arguing this interpretation of the end of the play jarred with the farcical elements preceding it which were stripped away as the play progressed. Lyn Gardner of The Guardian wrote, "Morrison tries to sweeten the pill with some excruciating unfunny funny business. In undercutting the appalling bleakness of his vision of the current state of relations between men and women, he muddies his own argument to such an extent that the audience isn't necessarily appalled by Katherina's submission." Charles Spencer, writing for The Telegraph, called it "a hateful, hate-filled night of theatre." Scholar Jeremy Lopez, on the other hand, wrote that despite aspects of the play he often doesn't like in theatre, he found the production compelling, and liked it despite himself; "I have never been to a Shakespeare production with a group of Shakespeare scholars where there has been such forceful, decisive response—where people were actually, volubly angry or excited as opposed to equivocally, phlegmatically satisfied or disappointed."
- Lucy Bailey's 2012 RSC production at the Royal Shakespeare Theatre, starring Lisa Dillon and David Caves, with Nick Holder as Sly. Set in 1940's Italy, the entire set was designed to look like a giant bed, in which Sly has his dream of a tattooed Petruchio attempted to woo a drinking, smoking, irreverent Katherina. Dillon delivered Katherina's final speech with heavy irony, but the production left little doubt that there was a strong sexual chemistry between herself and Petruchio.
- Haissam Hussain's 2012 production at Shakespeare's Globe, performed in Urdu as part of the Globe to Globe Festival, starring Nadia Jamil as Qurat ul Aine (Katherina) and Omair Rana as Rustum (Petruchio). Relocated to Lahore, the play featured a shapeshifting sprite named Ravi, who acted as a chorus throughout.
- Toby Frow's 2012 production at Shakespeare's Globe, starring Samantha Spiro and Simon Paisley Day. On 27 July, the production was broadcast live to cinemas around the world as part of the "Globe on Screen" series. It was subsequently released on DVD and Blu-ray. This production included Sly coming up out of the audience and fighting with theatre staff, and Katherina's final speech delivered sincerely, with the impression given that she and Petruchio had genuinely fallen in love.
- Caroline Byrne's 2016 production at Shakespeare's Globe, starring Aoife Duffin and Edward MacLiam. Relocated to Dublin during the 1916 Easter Rising, all references to "Italian" are changed to "Irish", and W. B. Yeats' poem "Easter, 1916" is adapted into a refrain repeated several times during the narrative. Renamed "Numbered in Song", the refrain is used to celebrate the lives of women unsung throughout Irish history. Kate's behaviour is portrayed as a rebellion against church, state and family, and although she is wed against her will, her final speech is presented as a condemnation of a misogynist society.
- Barbara Gaines' 2017 production at the Chicago Shakespeare Theater, with an all-female cast, starring Alexandra Henrikson as Katherina and Crystal Lucas-Perry as Petruchio. Set against the backdrop of the Suffragette Movement, specifically the 1919 Congressional debates regarding the 19th Amendment, a Women's Club is preparing a production of The Taming of the Shrew, with the divisive political situation in the country at large finding its way into rehearsals, with some of the company in favour of the amendment, and others opposed.
- Michael Fentiman's 2019 production at the Sherman Theatre and Justin Audibert's 2019 Royal Shakespeare Theater production. Both productions swapped the gender of every cast member. Fentiman's production starred Scarlett Brookes as Petruchio and Matt Gavan as Katherina; Audibert's starred Claire Price as Petruchia and Joseph Arkley as Katherina.

== Theatrical adaptations ==
The first known adaptation of The Taming of the Shrew was The Woman's Prize, or The Tamer Tamed, a sequel written by John Fletcher c.1611. In Fletcher's play, Katherina has died, and Petruchio has remarried, to an equally fiery woman named Maria. Attempting to tame her similarly to Katherina, Petruchio finds his tactics failing, and Maria refusing to consummate their marriage until Petruchio changes his ways. She bands together with other women who are also refusing to consummate their marriages. In an effort to elicit her sympathy, Petruchio pretends to be sick, but his plan backfires when Maria has him walled up in his own bedroom, telling everyone he has the plague. Upon breaking out, he finds her dressed like a prostitute and flirting with his friends. Vowing the marriage is over, he announces he is going to travel abroad, but Maria responds by wishing him well. Eventually, Petruchio decides to pretend to be dead. Maria begins to cry but reveals she is doing so not because she is sad at her loss, but because it upsets her that Petruchio was such a pathetic person who wasted his life. He reveals he is not dead, and, impressed with the ruse, Maria decides to end her "taming". The play ends with them agreeing to live a life of mutual respect. When the two plays were performed at court in November 1633, Master of the Revels Henry Herbert recorded Shrew was "likt" but Tamer Tamed was "very well likt".

During the 1660s, Shrew was adapted by John Lacy as Sauny the Scot, to make it better match with Fletcher's sequel. Originally performed under the Taming of the Shrew title, the play was published in 1698 as Sauny the Scot: or, The Taming of the Shrew: A Comedy. This version inconsistently anglicised the character names and recast the play in prose. Lacy also expanded the part of Grumio into the title role Sauny (who speaks in a heavy Scottish brogue), which he played himself. Sauny is an irreverent, cynical companion to Petruchio, and is comically terrified of his master's new bride. Lucentio was renamed Winlove, Baptista became Lord Beaufoy and Katherina was renamed Meg. In Sauny, Petruchio is much more vicious, threatening to whip Meg if she doesn't marry him, then telling everyone she is dead, and tying her to a bier. The play ends with her thoroughly tamed. Lacy's work premiered at Drury Lane in 1667, starring Susanna Verbruggen and George Powell. Samuel Pepys saw it on 9 April and again on 1 November, enjoying it on both occasions. The play was popular enough that it was still being performed as late as 1732, when it was staged at Goodman's Fields Theatre, and it seems to have supplanted Shrew's place on the English stage for the rest of the seventeenth century and the first half of the eighteenth.

In 1716, two rival adaptations, both named The Cobbler of Preston, opened in London. One, by Christopher Bullock, opened at Lincoln's Inn Fields in January 1716, and the other, by Charles Johnson, opened at Drury Lane the following month. Both concentrated on the practical joke element of the Induction and omitted entirely the Petruchio/Katherina story. Bullock renamed the character Sir Toby Guzzle, and Johnson called him Kit Sly. Both plays were short farces, designed to fill one-half of a playbill. Bullock's play proved more popular, being printed four times, and performed as late as 1759.

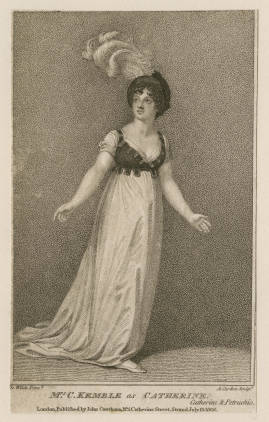
Marie Thérèse Kemble as Catherine in David Garrick's Catharine and Petruchio (1802).

The most successful adaptation was David Garrick's Catharine and Petruchio, which was first performed at Drury Lane in March 1754, starring Hannah Pritchard and Henry Woodward, although Pritchard was replaced by Kitty Clive in 1756. This adaptation dominated the stage for almost a century, with Shakespeare's play not returning to the English stage until 1844, although Garrick's version was still being performed as late as 1879, when Herbert Beerbohm Tree staged it. In Catharine and Petruchio, the subplot is entirely omitted; Bianca is married to Hortensio when the play opens. Consequently, it is not a full-length play and was often performed with Garrick's shorter version of The Winter's Tale or as an afterpiece. Indeed, the play only began to dwindle in popularity when afterpieces became less fashionable in the mid-eighteenth century. Prior to that, however, it was a huge success on both sides of the Atlantic; it was first staged in North America in 1768 at the John Street Theatre, starring Margaret Cheer and Lewis Hallam. It was performed at John Philip Kemble's benefit in 1788, with a text he had prepared himself, which deviated slightly from Garrick's, starring Sarah Siddons and Kemble himself. Kemble continued to play the role for many years, including a run opposite his wife, Priscilla Kemble, in 1810. Previously, Kemble's brother, Charles Kemble had also staged the play, acting alongside his own wife, Marie Thérèse Kemble, in 1802.

Much of Shakespeare's dialogue is reproduced verbatim. Much of the plot is also similar; Petruchio vows to marry Catharine before he has met her, she smashes a lute over the music tutor's head, Baptista fears no one will ever want to marry her; the wedding scene is identical, as is the scene where Grumio teases her with food; the haberdasher and tailor scene is very similar. At the end, however, there is no wager. Catharine makes her speech to Bianca, and Petruchio tells her,

Kiss me Kate, and since thou art become
So prudent, kind, and dutiful a Wife,
Petruchio here shall doff the lordly Husband;
An honest Mark, which I throw off with Pleasure.
Far hence all Rudeness, Wilfulness, and Noise,
And be our future Lives one gentle Stream
Of mutual Love, Compliance and Regard.

The play ends with Catharine stating "Nay, then I'm unworthy of thy Love,/And look with Blushes on my former self." Petruchio then directly addresses the audience, using some of the unused lines from Katherina's final speech. Michael Dobson argues that Garrick's changes to Shrew in writing Catharine and Petruchio "mute the outright feudal masculinism in favour of guardedly egalitarian, and specifically private, contemporary versions of sympathy and domestic virtue."

In 1973, Charles Marowitz adapted the play as The Shrew. Previewed at the Hot Theatre in The Hague, it premiered in the Open Space Theatre later in the year, starring Thelma Holt and Nikolas Simmonds. The play then went on international tour before a revival at the Open Space in 1975. Holt portrayed Katherina for the duration of the tour, but five separate actors portrayed Petruchio, with the last, Malcolm Tierney, considered the most successful. Refashioned as a Brothers Grimm-style gothic tragedy, the Induction was omitted, the characters of Gremio and Hortensio were removed, and the Bianca/Lucentio subplot featured as a modern-day parallel story, with both characters having their names removed, instead being simply male and female representatives. Marowitz also removed all aspects of comedy, and although he maintained a great deal of Shakespeare's original dialogue, he rearranged much of it. One example of this rearrangement was Marowitz's use of Bartholomew's lines in the Induction when he is trying to shun Sly's amorous advances;

Thrice noble lord, let me entreat of you
To pardon me yet for a night or two,
Or, if not so, until the sun be set,
For your physicians have expressly charged,
In peril to incur your former malady,
That I should yet absent me from your bed.
I hope this reason stands for my excuse.
(Induction 2. 116-122)

In The Shrew, these lines are spoken by Katherina near the end of the play. Petruchio's response is to beat her and anally rape her as his "gang" hold her down. As she is being raped, a high-pitched whistle sounds, with Katherina's mouth open as if the noise is her scream. At this point, the lights go down, and when they come back up, Katherina is dressed in an institutional gown. She delivers her final speech as if she has learned it, without any emotion or inflection, and requiring frequent prompting by Petruchio. As she finishes, she is flanked by the modern-day couple, one on each side of her, both in wedding attire, posing for imaginary photographers, "a juxtaposition suggesting that marriage legitimates psycho-social and psycho-sexual abuse." The final image of the play is Katherina in a wedding gown, chained to the ground, as a funeral bell tolls. Foregrounding the themes of sadism and brainwashing, in this version, the happy ending of Shakespeare's play thus takes on a disturbing irony. Marowitz described his intention in The Shrew as "a head-on confrontation with the intellectual substructure of the play, an attempt to test or challenge, revoke or destroy the intellectual foundation which makes a classic the formidable thing it has become [and to] combat the assumptions of a classic with a series of new assumptions, and force it to bend under the power of a new polemic." Due to the extreme nature of the production, the play divided critics and audiences, but it was a huge box office success.
