= Deborah May =

American actress and model (born 1948)

- Born: Deborah May; September 28, 1948 (age 77); Remington, Indiana, U.S.
- Occupations: Actress; Model
- Years active: 1973–present
- Known for: St. Elsewhere; Nurse Betty; The Kid
- Spouse: George DelHoyo (m. 1983)
- Children: 2

Deborah May (born September 28, 1948) is an American actress and model. May won the Miss Indiana beauty pageant in 1970.

== Life and career ==
May was born in Remington, Indiana. In 1970 she won Miss Indiana, and the following year was in the Miss America pageant. She later made her television debut guest-starring in an episode of The Streets of San Francisco in 1973. May later acted in a number of stage productions, notably part of a Great Performances-filmed stage production of The Taming of the Shrew (1976). From 1979 to 1980 she was a regular cast member on the CBS daytime soap opera Guiding Light. In 1981, May directed a documentary titled You Have Struck a Rock. The documentary encapsulates the history of a non-violent resistance of the black women of South Africa during apartheid. The documentary commemorates the contributions made by South African women in the anti-apartheid movement.

During the 1980s, May appeared in a number of made-for-television movies and series, notably the 1983 miniseries Rage of Angels and the NBC medical drama series St. Elsewhere (1985–86) as Terri Valere. She guest-starred on Falcon Crest, Remington Steele, The Twilight Zone, The Golden Girls, Murphy Brown, Star Trek: Deep Space Nine, Star Trek: Voyager, Seinfeld (episode "The Puffy Shirt") and L.A. Law. She made her big screen debut appearing in the 1984 comedy film The Woman in Red and later had supporting roles in Disney's The Kid, Nurse Betty and Johnny Be Good. She also had recurring roles in the ABC crime drama Murder One (1995–1996), and the NBC medical drama ER (1996–2002). From 1992 to 1998 she played the role of Melanie Parrish, a network executive in the HBO comedy series, The Larry Sanders Show.

In 2010, May had a recurring role as Catherine Cadence in the British television series The Cut. From 2016 to 2017, May had a recurring role on the AMC horror drama series The Walking Dead as Natania, the leader of Oceanside.

== Personal life ==
In August 1983, May married actor George DelHoyo. May also has two children with DelHoyo.

== Filmography ==
- The Streets of San Francisco (1 episode, 1973) as CT Actress
- The Taming of the Shrew (1976) as A Widow
- Mom, the Wolfman and Me (1980) as Gunilla
- Guiding Light (1979—1980) as Dr. Renee DuBois
- Rage of Angels (1983) as Mary Beth Warner
- You Have Struck a Rock! (1983)
- Welcome Home, Jellybean (1984) as Margaret Oxley
- The Woman in Red (1984) as Hostess
- Falcon Crest (1 episode, 1984) as Stephanie Hoffman
- Hotel (1 episode, 1984) as Tracy Hooten
- Remington Steele (1 episode, 1985) as Phyllis Lewis
- The Eagle and the Bear (1985)
- The Twilight Zone (1 episode, 1986) as Carol Ritchie (segment "Shadow Play")
- St. Elsewhere (11 episodes, 1985—1986) as Terri Valere
- The Golden Girls (1 episode, 1987) as Liz
- The Popcorn Kid (1 episode, 1987) as Yvonne Brickhouse*
- Buck James (1 episode, 1987) as Lori Fentriss
- Johnny Be Good (1988) as Mrs. Walker
- Why on Earth? (1988) as Healer Wilson
- In the Line of Duty: The F.B.I. Murders (1988) as Elaine McNeill
- Something Is Out There (2 episodes, 1988) as Dr. Harmon
- Murphy Brown (1 episode, 1989) as Secretary #13
- L.A. Law (2 episodes, 1988—1990) as Carla Stritch
- Snoops (1 episode, 1990) as Mercy Weatherbee
- Call Me Anna (1990) as Ethel Ross
- The Flash (1 episode, 1991) as Ruth Werneke
- Wings (1 episode, 1991) as Karen
- Caged Fear (1991) as Mrs. Charles
- Down Home (1 episode, 1991) as Audrey
- O Pioneers! (1992) as Mrs Bergson
- Jake and the Fatman (1 episode, 1992) as Diane Gunn
- Sexual Advances (1992) as Rita
- Hearts Afire (2 episodes, 1993) as Hollis
- Bodies of Evidence (1 episode, 1993) as Alice Aubry
- Seinfeld (1 episode, 1993) as Elsa
- Star Trek: Deep Space Nine (1 episode, 1993) as Haneek
- The Sinbad Show (1 episode, 1993) as Buffy Sinclair
- All-American Girl (1 episode, 1994) as Sheila
- Women of the House (1 episode, 1995) as Ann Gilroy
- A Walton Wedding (1995) as Sybil Carruthers
- The Other Mother: A Moment of Truth Movie (1995) as Kate
- Murder One (5 episodes, 1995—1996) as Dana Benson
- The Tomorrow Man (1996)
- After Jimmy (1996) as Karen
- Dark Skies (1 episode, 1996) as Mrs. Elwood
- Star Trek: Voyager (1 episode, 1997) as Lyris
- Days of Our Lives (2 episodes, 1997) as Marcia Marks
- Soul Man (1 episode, 1997) as Cloris Marley
- From the Earth to the Moon (1 episode, 1998) as Miss Hedges
- The Larry Sanders Show (10 episodes, 1992—1998) as Melanie Parrish
- Any Day Now (1 episode, 1999)
- Days of Our Lives (6 episodes, 1999) as Fran Hertz
- Nurse Betty (2000) as Gloria Walsh
- The Kid (2000) as Governor
- Gideon's Crossing (3 episodes, 2000—2001)
- Grounded for Life (1 episode, 2002) as Joan
- Days of Our Lives (4 episodes, 2002) as Iris
- The West Wing (1 episode, 2002) as Janet
- ER (6 episodes, 1996—2002) as Mary Cain
- Boomtown (3 episodes, 2002) as Ellen Little
- Malcolm in the Middle (1 episode, 2005) as Betty
- Cold Case (1 episode, 2008) as Simone Gallavan
- Dirty Sexy Money (1 episode, 2009) as Fertility Counsellor
- Last Man Standing (1 episode, 2012) as Stella
- The Last Ship (2 episodes, 2014—2015) as President Geller
- The Walking Dead (3 episodes, 2016—2017) as Natania
- 9-1-1 (1 episode, 2020) as Cindy
- Cobra Kai (1 episode, 2021) as Mrs. Mills
- Witch Hunt (2021) as Cynthia

== See also ==
- Miss America 1971
