= Rugantino =

Rugantino is a traditional stock character from commedia dell'arte, representing a cocky trickster from Rome. It may also refer to:

- Rugantino (play), an 1805 melodrama by Matthew Lewis
- Rugantino (musical), a 1962 musical comedy by Pietro Garinei and Sandro Giovannini
- Rugantino (film), a 1973 film by Pasquale Festa Campanile based on the musical
