= Hearts of Oak (1803 play) =

1803 play

- Original language: English
- Written by: John Till Allingham
- Genre: Comedy

Premiere
- Date: 19 November 1803
- Place: Theatre Royal, Drury Lane, London

Hearts of Oak is an 1803 comedy play by the English writer John Till Allingham. It premiered at the Theatre Royal, Drury Lane in London on 19 November 1803. The original Drury Lane cast included William Dowton as Ardent, Alexander Pope as Dorland, John Bannister as Tenpercent, Vincent De Camp as Edward, Charles Holland as Philip, Thomas Collins as Joe, George Frederick Cooke as Jerard, John Henry Johnstone as Brian O'Bradleigh, Jane Powell as Eliza, Nannette Johnston as Laura, Sarah Harlowe as Fanny and Sarah Sparks as Mrs O'Bradleigh.

== Bibliography ==
- Greene, John C. Theatre in Dublin, 1745-1820: A Calendar of Performances, Volume 6. Lexington Books, 2011.
- Nicoll, Allardyce. A History of English Drama 1660–1900: Volume IV. Cambridge University Press, 2009.
