= The Marriage Promise =

1803 play

- Original language: English
- Written by: John Till Allingham
- Genre: Comedy
- Setting: England, present day

Premiere
- Date: 16 April 1803
- Place: Theatre Royal, Drury Lane, London

The Marriage Promise is an 1803 comedy play by the British writer John Till Allingham. It premiered at the Theatre Royal, Drury Lane in London on 16 April 1803. The original cast included Charles Kemble as Charles Merton, John Dwyer as Sidney, William Dowton as Consols, John Bannister as Tandem, Robert Palmer as Woodland, Alexander Pope as George Howard, William Powell as Jeffries, Walter Maddocks as Bailiff, Jane Powell as Mrs Howard, Harriet Mellon as Mary Woodland, Sarah Sparks as Mrs Harvey and Dorothea Jordan as Emma The Irish premiere took place at the Crow Street Theatre in Dublin on 8 June 1803.

== Bibliography ==
- Greene, John C. Theatre in Dublin, 1745-1820: A Calendar of Performances, Volume 6. Lexington Books, 2011.
- Nicoll, Allardyce. A History of English Drama 1660–1900: Volume IV. Cambridge University Press, 2009.
