= After Jimmy =

1996 CBS TV movie directed by Glenn Jordan

- Genre: Drama
- Written by: Judith Fein; Cynthia Saunders
- Directed by: Glenn Jordan
- Starring: Meredith Baxter; Bruce Davison; Peter Facinelli; Mae Whitman
- Music by: Patrick Williams
- Country of origin: United States
- Original language: English

Production
- Executive producers: Aaron Spelling; E. Duke Vincent
- Producers: Glenn Jordan; Robert Bennett Steinhauer
- Cinematography: Neil Roach
- Editor: David A. Simmons
- Running time: 99 minutes

Original release
- Network: CBS
- Release: September 24, 1996

After Jimmy is a 1996 American made-for-television drama film based on a true story starring Meredith Baxter as a woman, with her family, mourning the suicide death of her teenage son. As of 2008, the film has not been released on video or DVD.

== Premise ==
Depressed eighteen-year-old Jimmy Stapp commits suicide by shooting himself in the head with his father's gun. His family (mother Maggie, father Sam, and two young siblings Billy and Rosie) struggles to deal with life, amid questions of why they didn't see the signs sooner and what could have precipitated suicide. Both parents grieve very differently in the aftermath, which divides them as they search for a way to bring their family back together.

== Cast ==
- Meredith Baxter as Margaret "Maggie" Stapp
- Bruce Davison as Ward "Sam" Stapp
- Peter Facinelli as James "Jimmy" Stapp
- Mae Whitman as Rosanna "Rosie" Stapp
- Ryan Slater as William "Billy" Stapp
- Eva Marie Saint as Liz
- Natalia Nogulich as Lydia
- Deborah May as Karen
- Željko Ivanek as Dr. Darren Walters
- Tina Lifford as Susan Johnson
- Scott Michael Campbell as Matt
- Raye Birk as John Davies
- Dean Norris as Ray Johnson
- Jeanne Mori as Jane
- Deborah May as Karen
- Aaron Lustig as Mike
