= The Land We Live In =

1804 play

- Original language: English
- Written by: Francis Ludlow Holt
- Genre: Comedy

Premiere
- Date: 29 December 1804
- Place: Theatre Royal, Drury Lane, London

The Land We Live In is an 1804 comedy play by the British writer Francis Ludlow Holt. It appeared at the Theatre Royal, Drury Lane in London on 29 December 1804. The cast included Dorothea Jordan as Lady Lovelace, Richard Wroughton as Sir Rowland English, William Powell as Sir Edward Melville, Robert William Elliston as Young Melville, William Barrymore as Sir Harry Lovelace, Vincent De Camp as Harcourt, John Bannister as Dexter, Ralph Wewitzer as Peter, Charles Mathews as Robert, John Henry Johnstone as Larry MacBoof, William Chatterley as Waiter, Maria Kemble as Miss Betty, Sarah Sparks as Mrs Doublecharge, Harriet Mellon as Polly, Charlotte Tidswell as Susan.

== Bibliography ==
- Greene, John C. Theatre in Dublin, 1745-1820: A Calendar of Performances, Volume 6. Lexington Books, 2011.
- Nicoll, Allardyce. A History of Early Nineteenth Century Drama 1800-1850. Cambridge University Press, 1930.
