= Elizabeth Harper =

Elizabeth Harper may refer to:

- Elizabeth Bannister (1757–1849), born Elizabeth Harper, British actress and singer
- Class Actress, stage name of Elizabeth Harper, American musician
- Elizabeth Harper (humanitarian), New Zealand humanitarian, see the list of dames commander of the Order of the British Empire
- Elizabeth Kucinich (née Harper, born 1977), British-born third wife of United States congressman Dennis Kucinich
- Elizabeth Harper (biologist), British evolutionary biologist
