= The Sailor's Daughter =

1804 play

- Original language: English
- Written by: Richard Cumberland
- Genre: Comedy
- Setting: Bath, present day

Premiere
- Date: 7 April 1804
- Place: Theatre Royal, Drury Lane

The Sailor's Daughter is a comedy play by the British writer Richard Cumberland which first premiered on 7 April 1804 at the Theatre Royal, Drury Lane.

== Plot ==
After a young woman, Julia, is orphaned following the Battle of Copenhagen she enjoys a series of adventures until settling down with her long-lost guardian Captain Sentamore. The play is set in Bath.

== Reception ==
The first performance received a mixed reception with the house "divided in opinion". A review in Lloyd's Evening Post described it as: "marked with several traits of a muse whose labours have contributed in this department to the improvement of the English drama, but is, upon the whole, far inferior to the pieces from which the author has acquired his deserved celebrity."

== Actors ==
The original Drury Lane cast included:

- Mr Wroughton (Richard Wroughton) as Sir Mathew Moribund
- Mr Dwyer as Mandeville
- Mr Pope (Alexander Pope) as Captain Sentamour
- Mr Russell as Varnish
- Mr Caulfield (Thomas Caulfield) as Singleton
- Mr Bannister, jun. (John Bannister) as Hartshorn, an apothecary
- Mr Bartley (George Bartley) as Lindsay
- Mr Dowton (William Dowton) as Raven, Sir Mathew's servant
- Mr Evans as Shopman to Hartshorn
- Mr Rhodes as Servant to Varnish
- Mr Webb as Servant to Sir Mathew
- Mrs Jordan (Dorothea Jordan) as Louisa Davenant
- Mrs H. Johnston (Nannette Johnston) as Julia Clareville
- Mrs Sparks (Sarah Sparks) as Mrs Hartshorn
- Mrs Maddocks as Nurse

== Bibliography ==
- Ennis, Daniel James. Enter the Press Gang: Naval Impressment in Eighteenth-Century British Literature. Associated University Presses, 2002.
