= Elizabeth Harper (biologist) =

Evolutionary biologist

- Education: University of Cambridge Open University
- Scientific career
- Thesis: The evolution of the cemented habit in the bivalved molluscs (1991)

Elizabeth M. Harper is an evolutionary biologist known for her work on molluscs. She is an honorary fellow of the British Antarctic Survey and was accorded the title of Honorary Professor by the University of Cambridge in 2019.

== Education and career ==
Harper was born in Ipswich, Suffolk. She has a B.A. (and M.A Cantab) from the University of Cambridge and earned her doctorate from the Open University. As of 2021, Harper is a professor at the University of Cambridge, and a fellow of Gonville and Caius college. Harper has used the collections at the Sedgwick Museum of Earth Sciences for her research, and she was made an honorary curator of the invertebrate paleontology in 2004, and has twice served as acting director of the museum. In 2019, the University of Cambridge bestowed the title of Honorary Professor of Evolutionary Malacology on Harper.

As of June 2023, Harper is the Director of Studies in Earth Sciences, as well as a College Lecturer, at Gonville and Caius college.

== Research ==
Harper's research focuses on molluscan biology and biomineralization. Her early research used genome size in living organisms to infer genome size in fossils. She has subsequently examined the process of biomineralization, or how bivalves make cement, how pteropods repair their shells, and the factors controlling the shape of shells in blue mussels and oysters. She has defined the factors controlling feeding on molluscs by examining drilling into shells, and worked on a collaborative project that considered multiple areas of research to define the origins of bivalves. Harper's research includes investigations into how different species of molluscs may respond to future changes in water chemistry, most recently revealing how brachiopods are able to alter the thickness of their shell under conditions that would lead to increased dissolution of their shells.

== Selected publications ==
- Harper, Elizabeth M.; Forsythe, Graham T. W.; Palmer, Tim (1998). "Taphonomy and the Mesozoic Marine Revolution: Preservation State Masks the Importance of Boring Predators". PALAIOS. 13 (4): 352. Bibcode:1998Palai..13..352H. doi:10.2307/3515323. ISSN 0883-1351. JSTOR 3515323.
- Harper, E. M. (2000). "Are calcitic layers an effective adaptation against shell dissolution in the Bivalvia?". Journal of Zoology. 251 (2): 179–186. doi:10.1111/j.1469-7998.2000.tb00602.x. ISSN 1469-7998.
- The evolutionary biology of the Bivalvia. Elizabeth Harper, John David Taylor, J. A. Crame, Geological Society of London. London: Geological Society. 2000. ISBN 1-86239-076-2. OCLC 59508484.
- Bieler, Rüdiger; Mikkelsen, Paula M.; Collins, Timothy M.; Glover, Emily A.; González, Vanessa L.; Graf, Daniel L.; Harper, Elizabeth M.; Healy, John; Kawauchi, Gisele Y.; Sharma, Prashant P.; Staubach, Sid (2014). "Investigating the Bivalve Tree of Life – an exemplar-based approach combining molecular and novel morphological characters". Invertebrate Systematics. 28 (1): 32. doi:10.1071/IS13010. ISSN 1445-5226. S2CID 84568643.

== Awards and honours ==
In 1990, Harper received the President's Award from the Palaeontological Association. As of 2021, Harper is named an honorary fellow of the British Antarctic Survey.

Mautodontha harperae, and extinct species of endodontid land snails in Makatea [French Polynesia], is named in her honour.
