= Catharine and Petruchio =

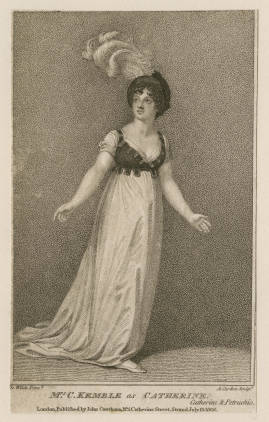
Marie Thérèse Kemble as Catharine in David Garrick's Catherine and Petruchio.

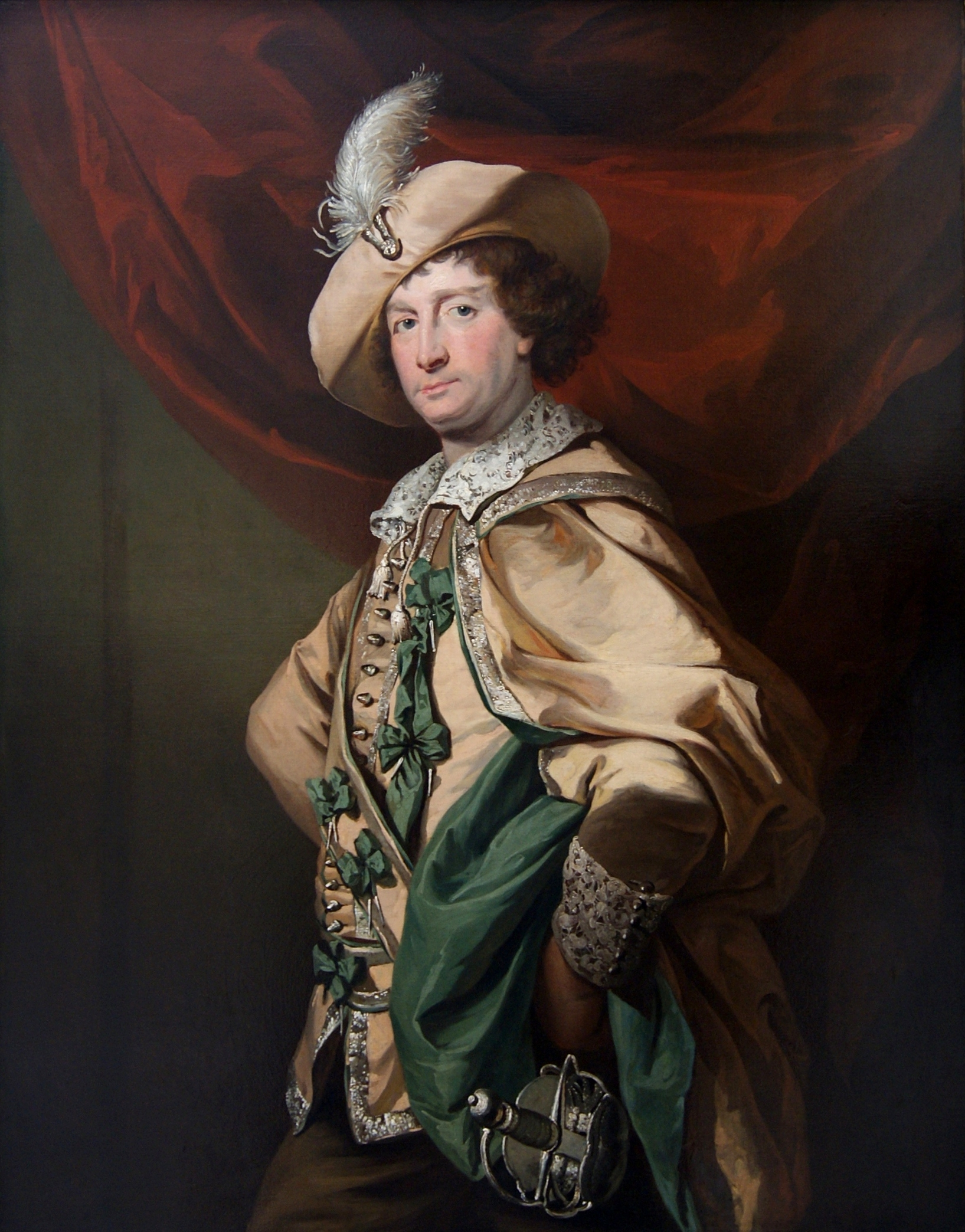
A portrait of Henry Woodward (1714–1777) portraying Petruchio (by Benjamin van der Gucht

Catharine and Petruchio is a reworking of William Shakespeare's The Taming of the Shrew by British playwright and actor David Garrick. It was written in 1754 and was performed far more often than the original The Shrew through the eighteenth and nineteenth centuries.

== Performance History ==
The Taming of the Shrew was revived following the English Civil War in the second half of the seventeenth century, but not necessarily in Shakespeare's 'original' version. The seventeenth and eighteenth centuries saw multiple adaptations of Shakespeare's The Shrew. And, as in Nahum Tate's adaptation of King Lear, which transforms the tragic ending into a happy marriage between Cordelia and Edgar, the idea that Shakespeare's works were sacrosanct and inalterable was not yet established.

Of the many versions of The Shrew that appeared, David Garrick's was the most popular and influential. For example, his was the first production in which Petruchio uses a whip in Act II, scene II, seemingly initiated by actor John P. Kemble, who played Petruchio. Between 1754 and 1844, Catherine and Petruchio was the only version of Shakespeare's play performed on British and American stages, and the sixth most popular Shakespearean play, according to scholar Frances E. Dolan.

== Plot ==
The play Catharine and Petruchio condenses Shakespeare's play into three acts. Much of the plot is also similar; Petruchio vows to marry Catharine before he has even seen her, she smashes a lute over the music tutor's head, Baptista fears no one will ever want to marry her; the wedding scene is identical, as is the scene where Grumio teases her with food; the haberdasher and tailor scene is very similar; the sun and moon conversation, and the introduction of Vincentio are both taken from Shakespeare. The Christopher Sly frame is also entirely absent.

However, much of Shakespeare's original dialogue is preserved, particularly when Petruchio discusses taming strategies.

== Changes from Shakespeare's The Shrew ==
The ending of Shakespeare's play The Taming of the Shrew, particularly the question of whether Katherine is actually 'tamed' or not is frequently debated. Garrick's play provides a narrower interpretation than Shakespeare's ambiguous ending. There is no wager. Instead, Catharine makes her speech to Bianca, though without the offer to put her hand beneath her husband's foot. Her reasons for women's subordination, namely that their "soft and weak and smooth" bodies are unsuited for life outside the home, are omitted, as are her assertions that "my mind hath been as big as one of yours, / My heart as great, my reason haply more, / To bandy word for word and frown for frown; but now I see our lances are but straws/ Our strength as weak, our weakness past compare" (V.II.174-178).

Instead, Garrick's Catharine rather ambiguously agrees with her father's exclamation that she has been "altered" by saying "Indeed I am--I am transformed to stone."

After her speech, Petruchio tells her,

Kiss me Kate, and since thou art become
So prudent, kind, and dutiful a Wife,
Petruchio here shall doff the lordly Husband;
An honest Mark, which I throw off with Pleasure.
Far hence all Rudeness, Wilfulness, and Noise,
And be our future Lives one gentle Stream
Of mutual Love, Compliance and Regard.

Petruchio claims that his 'taming' was just a temporary act to establish the terms of his and Catherine's relationship, and promises not to mistreat her. However, he does conclude the play with the lines:

How shameful 'tis when women are so simple
To offer war where they should kneel for peace,
Or seek for rule, supremacy, and sway,
Where bound to love, to honor, and obey.

(Act 3, lines 63-66)

Finally, while Shakespeare's The Shrew allows other characters to comment on Katherine's speech and thus add layers of nuance and doubt to her pronouncement, Garrick's play concludes after these lines.

== Reception ==
Of the many adaptations of The Taming of the Shrew, the most successful was David Garrick's Catharine and Petruchio, which was introduced in 1754 and dominated the stage for almost two centuries, with Shakespeare's play not returning until 1844 in England and 1887 in the United States, although Garrick's version was still being performed as late as 1879, when Herbert Beerbohm Tree staged it. In Garrick's version, the subplot is entirely omitted, Bianca is married to Hortensio when the play opens. Consequently, it is not a full-length play, and was often performed with Garrick's shorter version of The Winter's Tale. Much of Shakespeare's dialogue is reproduced verbatim. Garrick's play was a huge success, and major productions took place in the United States in 1754 (with Hannah Pritchard as Catherine), in 1788 (with Sarah Siddons and John Philip Kemble), in 1810 (again with Kemble and his real life wife, Priscilla Hopkins Brereton), and in 1842 (with William Charles Macready as Petruchio).

== Adaptation ==
An adaptation of Catherine and Petruchio written by Kemble premiered in 1810 in Covent-Garden.
