= Rugantino (play) =

1805 play

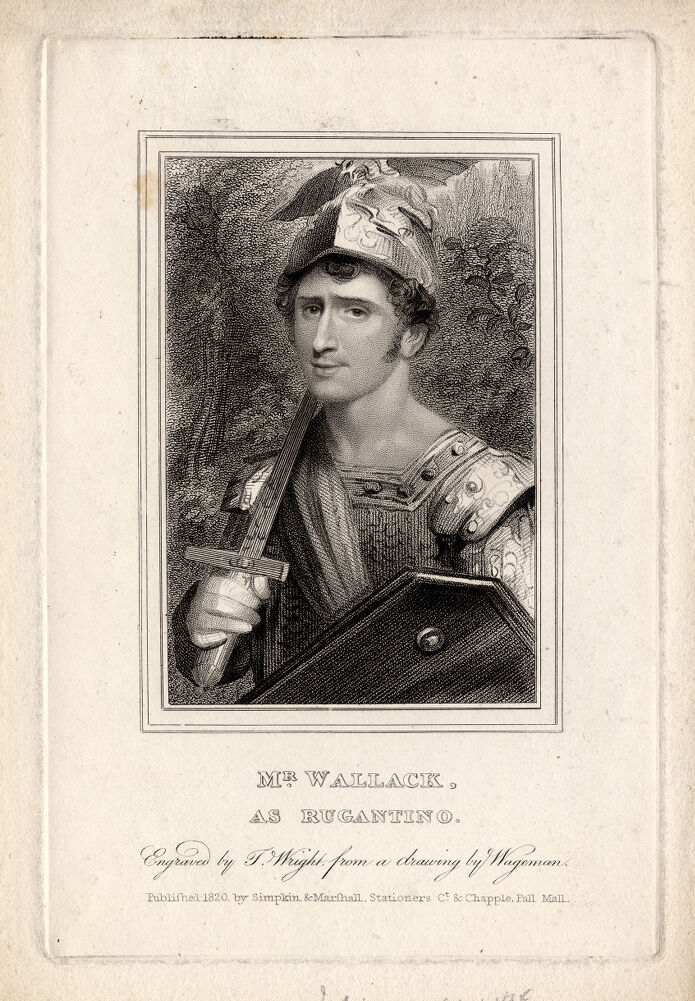
- James William Wallack in the title role in 1820.
- Original language: English
- Written by: Matthew Lewis
- Genre: Melodrama
- Setting: Venice

Premiere
- Date: 18 October 1805
- Place: Theatre Royal, Covent Garden, London

Rugantino is an 1805 melodrama by the British writer Matthew Lewis. An afterpiece, it was originally staged at the Theatre Royal, Covent Garden on 18 October 1805. It was inspired by the 1801 French play L'Homme à Trois Visages by René-Charles Guilbert de Pixérécourt. The original cast included Charles Murray as Andreas, Duke of Venice, John Liston as Meme, William Abbot as Poole, Henry Erskine Johnston as Rugantino and Isabella Mattocks as Camilla. It premiered in Ireland at Dublin's Crow Street Theatre on 26 January 1807. It was revived at Drury Lane in 1820 with a cast featuring James William Wallack as Rugantino, Thomas Cooke as Contarino, William Oxberry as Memme, John Pritt Harley as Stephane, Walter Maddocks as Harald, Sarah Sparks as Camilla and Charlotte Tidswell as Bettina.

== Bibliography ==
- Greene, John C. Theatre in Dublin, 1745-1820: A Calendar of Performances, Volume 6. Lexington Books, 2011.
- Nicoll, Allardyce. A History of Early Nineteenth Century Drama 1800-1850. Cambridge University Press, 1930.
