= Akhlaq-e-Hindi =

Akhlak E Hindi اخلاق ہندی
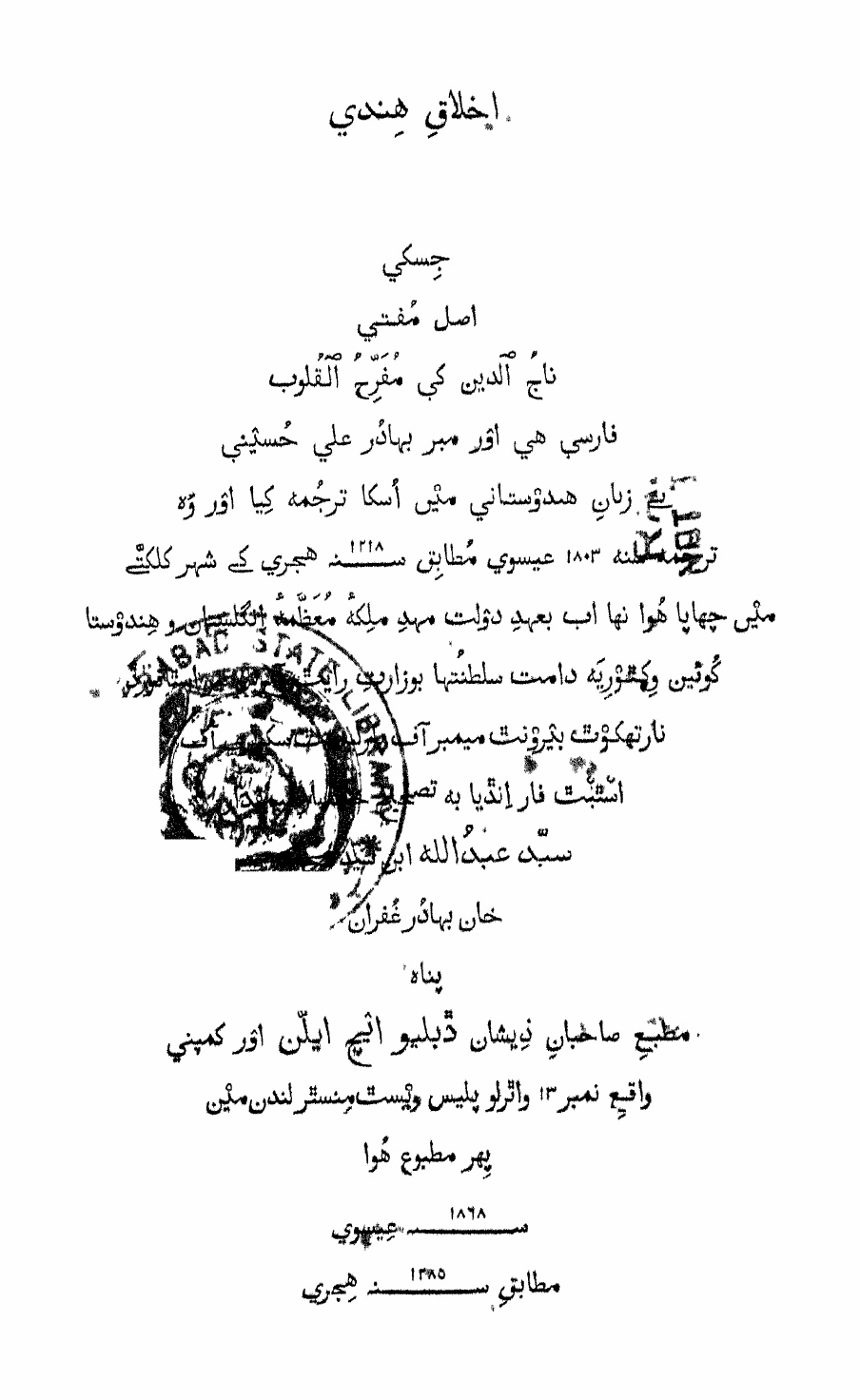
- Author: Bahadur Ali Hussaini
- Language: Urdu
- Subject: ethics of life
- Published: Fort William College
- Pages: 160

Akhlak E Hindi (Urdu: اخلاق ہندی) is the first Urdu book printed in printing-press in 1803. The book was written by Mir Bahadur Ali Hussaini and deals with ethics.
