= John Bannister (actor) =

English actor and theatre manager

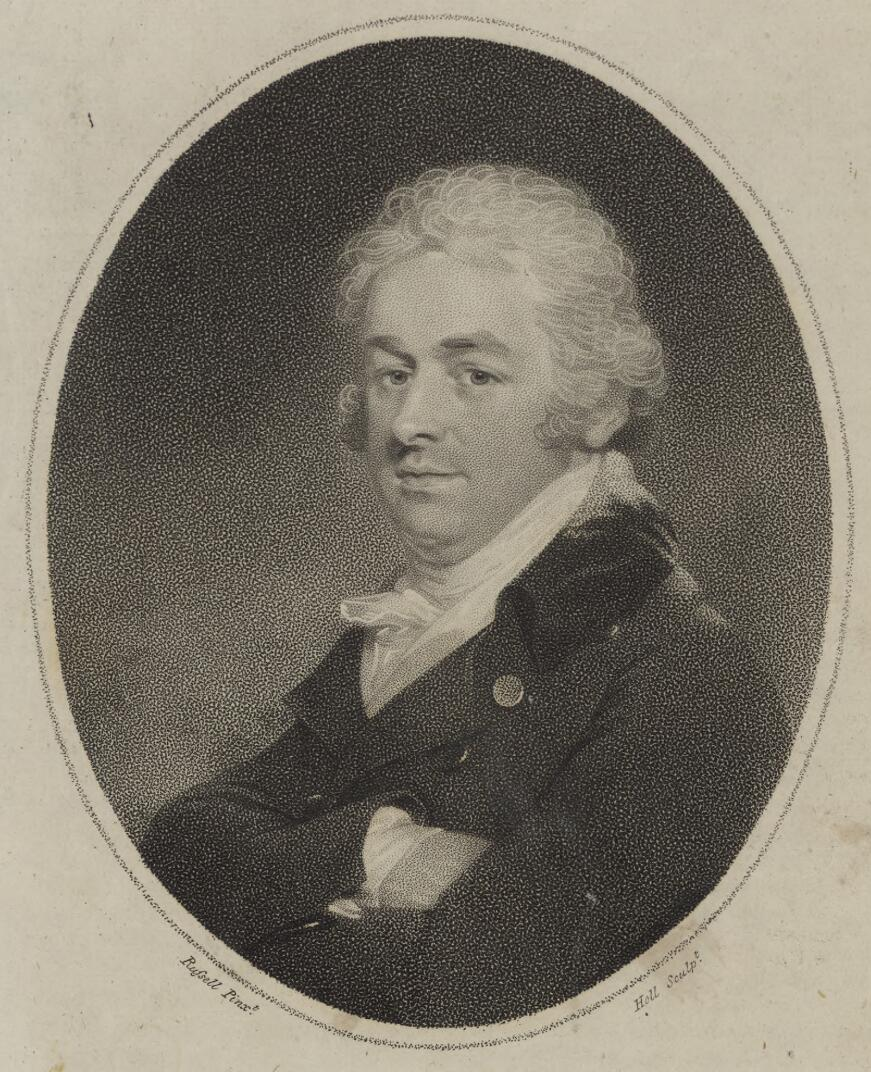
- Born: 12 May 1760; Deptford
- Died: 7 November 1836 (aged 76)
- Occupations: actor; theatre manager
- Spouse: Elizabeth Harper (m. 1783)
- Children: 6
- Relatives: Charles Bannister (father)

John Bannister (12 May 1760 – 7 November 1836) was an English actor and theatre manager. The principal source for his life are his own Memoirs, and as a leading performer his career is well documented.

== Biography ==
John Bannister was born at Deptford. He was the son of Charles Bannister, also an actor. He first studied to be a painter, but soon took to the stage. His first formal appearance was at the Haymarket Theatre in 1778 as Dick in Arthur Murphy's farce The Apprentice.

The same year at Theatre Royal, Drury Lane he played in James Miller's version of Voltaire's Mahomet the part of Zaphna, which he had studied under David Garrick. The Palmira of the cast was Mrs Robinson ("Perdita"). His reputation increased with his personification of Don Whiskerando in The Critic in 1779, and he was well known in the character of Joseph Surface in The School for Scandal.

On 26 January 1783, Bannister married Elizabeth Harper, who was a skilled actor and singer. Bannister was concerned about the rise of John Philip Kemble and his wife taught him to sing to help him compete. They had four daughters and two sons and his wife retired in 1792 to concentrate on their family.

Bannister was the best low comedian of his day. He was in the first presentation of the comic burletta Hero and Leander by Isaac Jackman, as Solano, opposite John Braham as Hymen, with which John Palmer's Royalty Theatre in Goodman's Fields embarked in 1787 upon comedy theatre having been prevented by statute from presenting serious drama. He appeared as Juan in Stephen Storace's first musical success at Drury Lane in the same year, in James Cobb's adaptation of Dittersdorf's The Doctor and the Apothecary. He led the cast in 1788 as the whimsical Sir David Dunder in George Colman the Younger's Ways and Means.

Bannister is mentioned several times in the Memoirs of his friend Michael Kelly. He was in the first production of Stephen Storace's The Pirates (text by James Cobb), with Kelly, Charles Dignum, Mrs Crouch and Mme Storace, under Sheridan's direction, at the King's Theatre on 20 November 1792.

In 1797, Richard Cumberland wrote and staged (on 8 May 1797, at Drury Lane) his comedy The Last of the Family as a benefit for Bannister. It was repeated four times. Cumberland had been offended by the ridicule heaped on him in The Critic, and much disliked Sheridan. Before the production, Kelly and Bannister were invited to Tunbridge Wells to hear the play read over dinner. Kelly fell asleep during the reading. In revenge the pair were later treated to a reading of the first three acts of Cumberland's five-act tragedy Tiberius, and only avoided acts four and five by fleeing back to London.

In 1799 Bannister joined with Kelly to acquire the English copyright in a German work by Kotzebue (whose Pizarro had provided such an effective source for Sheridan), and induced Tom Dibdin to create a new libretto around the dramatic incidents, called Of Age Tomorrow, for which Kelly then provided the music. Bannister appeared in it (opposite Miss De Camp, the future Mrs Charles Kemble), in the character of the Hair Dresser, and he could not 'have handled the comb, curling irons and powder puff more skilfully'. In November 1802 he was again with Kelly, Miss De Camp, Richard Suett, and Ralph Wewitzer in James Cobb's A House to be Sold.

As manager of Drury Lane (1802–1815) Bannister was no less successful. He performed in Richard Cumberland's The Sailor's Daughter (1804) as Hartshorn, which despite a poor start continued its run. In February 1809 he was one of the group including Michael Kelly, Richard Sheridan and William Dowton who met with Richard Wroughton (stage-manager) on the day after the fire which destroyed the theatre, and under Sheridan's exhortation agreed to keep the company together so far as possible during their subsequent removal to the Lyceum in the Strand.

In the 1814 revival of George Farquhar's The Inconstant, 'The inimitable performance of Bisarre, by Mrs Jordan, and of Duretete, by Mr John Bannister, will long be remembered with delight.' The same year saw him as Scrub in the same author's The Beaux's Stratagem (originally 1707), and as Colonel Feignwell (with Dowton as Obadiah Prim) in Mrs. Centlivre's comedy A Bold Stroke For A Wife (first produced 1718). In the 1815 production of The Apprentice (his debut role), 'The performance of Dick, by Mr. John Bannister, and his admirable recitation of the prologue' (written by Garrick) 'were fortunate instances of that gentleman's comic versatility.'

He never gave up his taste for painting, and Thomas Gainsborough, George Morland and Thomas Rowlandson were among his friends.
