= The Secret of Hegel =

Book by James Hutchison Stirling

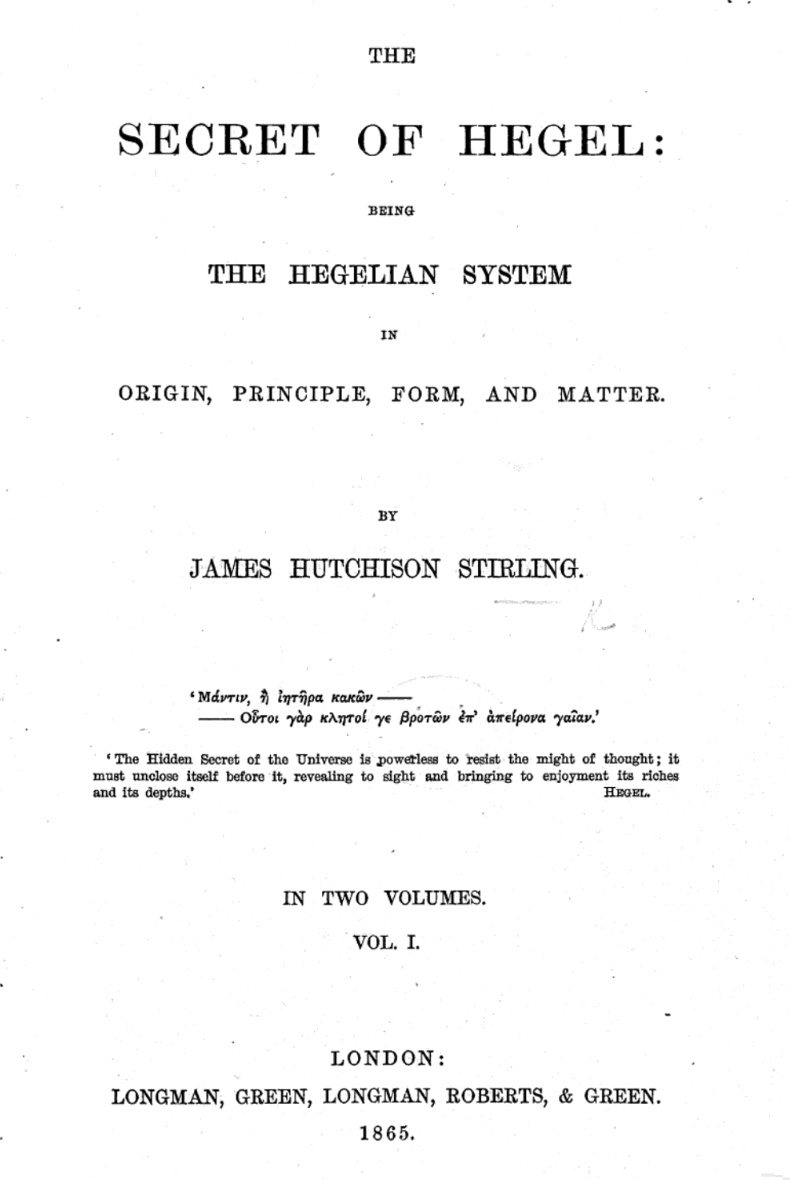
- Title page
- Author: James Hutchison Stirling
- Language: English
- Subject: Georg Wilhelm Friedrich Hegel
- Genre: Philosophy
- Publisher: Longman, Green, Longman, Roberts & Green.
- Publication date: 1865
- Publication place: United Kingdom

The Secret of Hegel: Being the Hegelian System in Origin, Principle, Form and Matter is the full title of an important work on the philosophical system of German philosopher Georg Wilhelm Friedrich Hegel (1770–1831) by James Hutchison Stirling (1820–1909), a Scottish idealist philosopher.

The 1st edition of The Secret of Hegel was published in 2 vols. in 1865 by the London publisher Longman, Green, Longman, Roberts & Green. Vol. 1 contains lxxiv + 465 pages, and Vol. 2 contains viii + 624 pages.

The 2nd, revised, edition of The Secret of Hegel was published in 1 vol. in 1898, and contains xiii + 761 pages. The 2nd, revised, edition (1898) was published simultaneously by 3 different publishers, as follows:

(1) Edinburgh: Oliver & Boyd (2) London: Simpkin, Marshall & Co, Ltd. (3) New York: G. P. Putnam's Sons

This work has influenced many British philosophers and helped to create the philosophical movement known as British idealism.

== The secret ==
Stirling wrote:

The secret of Hegel may be indicated at shortest thus: As Aristotle—with considerable assistance from Plato—made explicit the abstract Universal that was implicit in Socrates, so Hegel— with less considerable assistance from Fichte and Schelling—made explicit the concrete Universal that was implicit in Kant.

On page 84, Stirling gave an even shorter condensation: "Here is the secret of Hegel, or rather a schema to a key to it: Quantity—Time and Space—Empirical Realities."

In Chapter 1 he finds analogies between 16th century English drama and 19th century German idealism and compares Hegel to Shakespeare: "In the ferment of the English Drama, Marlow [sic], Ben Jonson, and others may, even beside Shakespeare, be correctly enough named principals; yet it is the last alone whom we properly term outcome."

In Chapter 11 he expresses some reservations: "In regard to Hegel, satisfaction and dissatisfaction are seldom far from each other, but the latter predominates. If, for a moment, the words light up, and a view be granted, as it were, into the inner mysteries, they presently quench themselves again in the appearance of mere arbitrary classification and artificial nomenclature."

At the end of the book a political intention becomes clearer as he invokes Hegel against the free thinking, “self will” and atomism he understands as a consequence of the Aufklärung (Enlightenment): “Hegel, indeed, has no object but ‘reconciling and neutralising atomism’ once again to restore to us ‘and in the new light of the new thought’ Immortality and Free-will, Christianity and God.”

== Readers' comments ==
John Stuart Mill, in his letter of November 6, 1867 to Alexander Bain, wrote:

Besides these I have been toiling through Stirling’s Secret of Hegel. It is right to learn what Hegel is & one learns it only too well from Stirling’s book. I say "too well" because I found by actual experience of Hegel that conversancy with him tends to deprave one’s intellect. The attempt to unwind an apparently infinite series of self–contradictions, not disguised but openly faced & coined into [illegible word] science by being stamped with a set of big abstract terms, really if persisted in impairs the acquired delicacy of perception of false reasoning & false thinking which has been gained by years of careful mental discipline with terms of real meaning. For some time after I had finished the book all such words as reflexion, development, evolution, &c., gave me a sort of sickening feeling which I have not yet entirely got rid of.

Julia Wedgwood reviewed the book in The Reader in two parts in 1865. She praised Hegel's dialectic, especially in relation to world history, the philosophy of right, and his account of the family, but she warned against the dangers of systems and predicted Hegel's thought would bear its ripest fruit elsewhere.,. (These anonymous essays are identified as hers in a letter from Frederick Denison Maurice).

J E Erdmann (A History of Philosophy vol. 3 p 197 tr W S Hough, London 1899) wrote:

In his otherwise so admirable work, The Secret of Hegel, … Fichte and Schelling are put far too much into the background.

Frederick Copleston (A History of Philosophy vol. VII, p. 12) wrote:

...we may be inclined to smile at J. H. Stirling's picture of Hegel as the great champion of Christianity.

Vladimir Lenin:

The secret was well kept!

== Editions ==
- The Secret of Hegel (2nd, revised, edition, 1898) is available online for free.
