= James Hutchison Stirling =

British philosopher

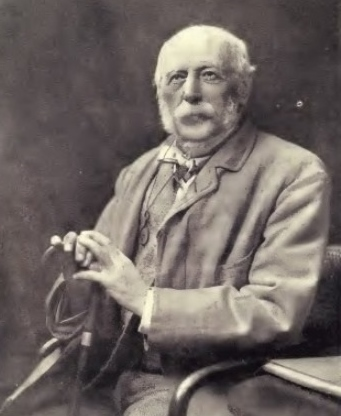
James Hutchison Stirling

James Hutchison Stirling (22 June 1820 – 19 March 1909) was a Scottish idealist philosopher and physician. His work The Secret of Hegel (1st edition, 1865, in 2 vols.; revised edition, 1898, in 1 vol.) gave great impetus to the study of Hegelian philosophy both in Britain and in the United States, and it was also accepted as an authoritative work on Hegel's philosophy in Germany and Italy. The book helped to create the philosophical movement known as British idealism.

== Biography ==
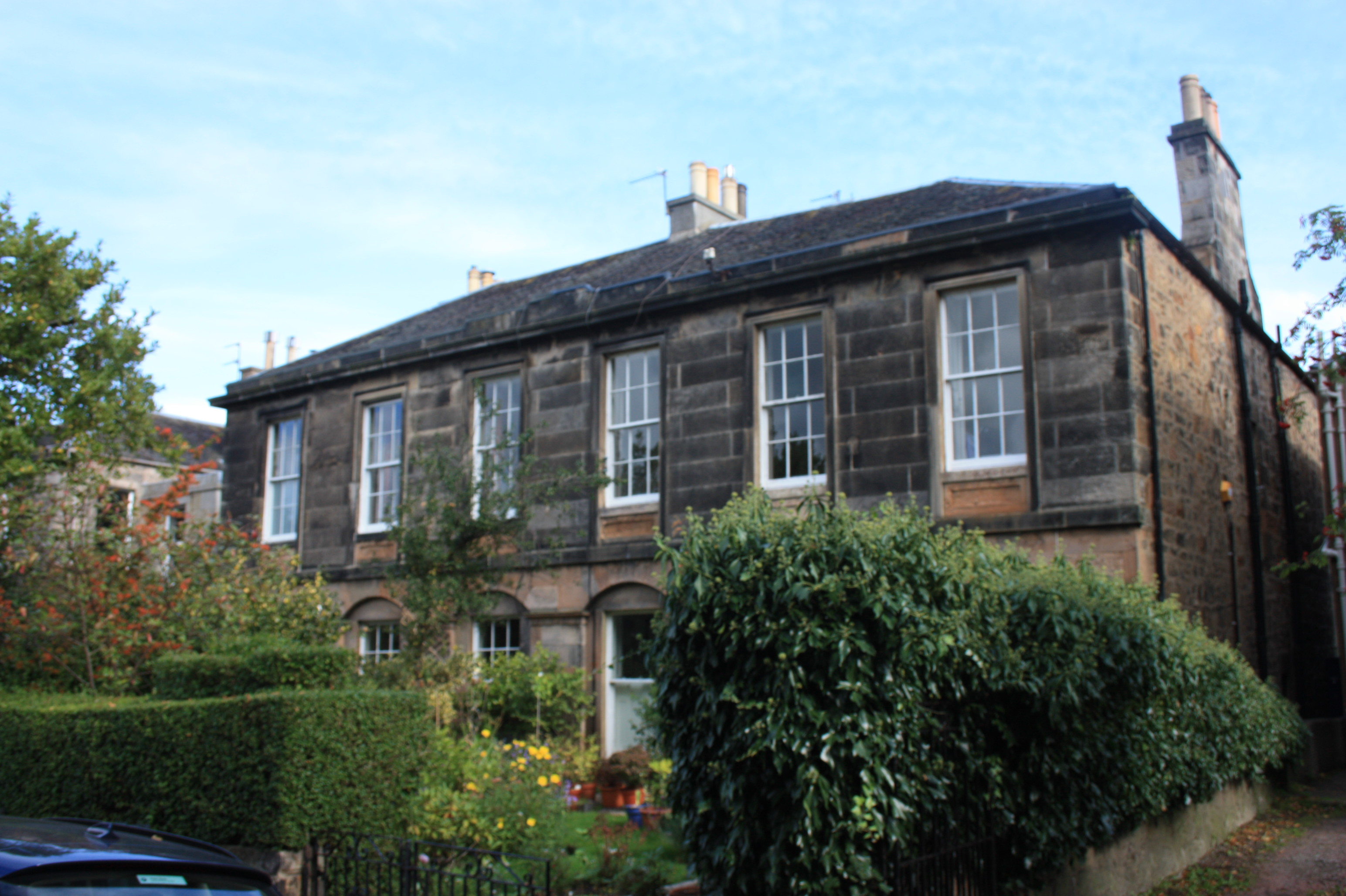
4 Laverockbank Road, Edinburgh (left)

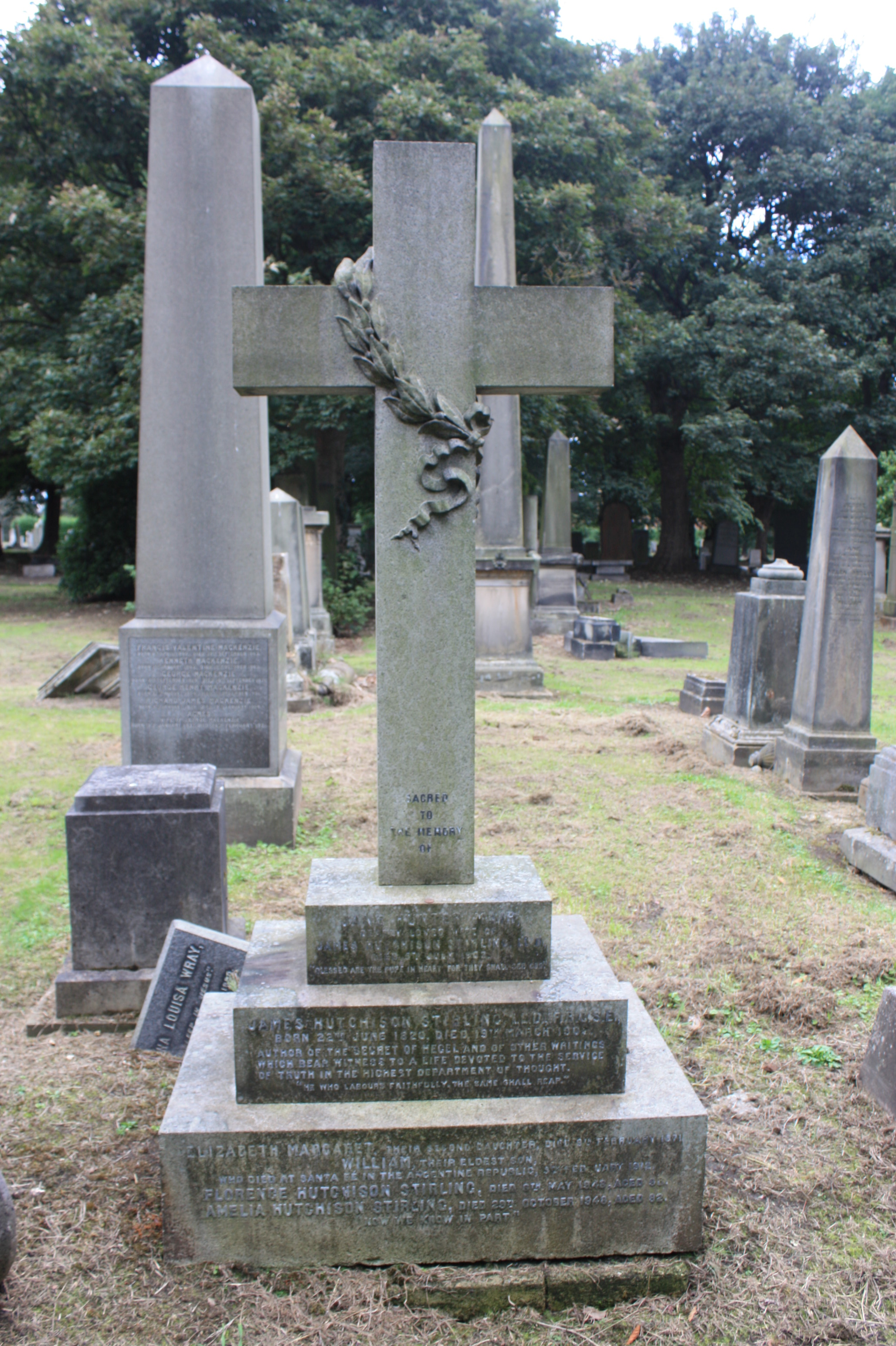
The grave of James Hutchison Stirling, Warriston Cemetery

James Hutchison Stirling was born in Glasgow, Scotland, the fifth son (and the youngest of six children) of William Stirling (died 14 March 1851) and Elizabeth Christie (d. 1828). William was a wealthy textile manufacturer who was a partner in the Glasgow firm of James Hutchison & Co., which manufactured muslin (lightweight cotton cloth in a plain weave, used for making sheets and for a variety of other purposes). William was known for his deeply-held religious views, many of which strongly influenced his son James.

Stirling studied at Young's Academy in Glasgow, followed by nine years of education (1833–1842) at the University of Glasgow, where he studied medicine, history, and classics. He became a Licentiate (1842, medical diploma) and Fellow (1860) of the Royal College of Surgeons of Edinburgh.

Stirling married Jane Hunter Mair (died 5 July 1903), an old family friend, on 28 April 1847 in Irvine, North Ayrshire, Scotland. The couple had seven children (five daughters and two sons), as follows: Jessie Jane Stirling (born 26 June 1850) (who married Rev. Robert Armstrong of Glasgow), Elizabeth Margaret Stirling (11 February 1852 – 1871), Amelia Hutchison Stirling, Florence Hutchison Stirling (1858 – 6 May 1948), Lucy Stirling, William Stirling, and David Stirling. Stirling's daughter Amelia wrote many books on historical subjects, and she was the joint-translator—with William Hale White (1831–1913)—of Spinoza's Ethics (1883). She also wrote a biography of her father James titled James Hutchison Stirling: His Life and Work (London and Leipzig: T. Fisher Unwin, 1912). Stirling's daughter Florence won the Scottish Ladies' Championship in chess five times (in 1905, 1906, 1907, 1912, and 1913).

After receiving a large inheritance from his father's estate in 1851, Stirling left his medical practice. He then set out to learn French and German, for the purpose of being able to better understand continental philosophical trends. In pursuit of this goal, he moved his family briefly to Boulogne-sur-Mer, France (located in the current Pas-de-Calais department of the Hauts-de-France region), then to Paris for 18 months, then to St. Servan (located two miles from the ferry port of St. Malo in the Ille-et-Vilaine department of the Brittany region of France) for four and a half years, and then finally to Heidelberg, Germany. In November 1857, Stirling and his family took up residence in London (at 3 Wilton Terrace, Kensington), where they lived for about three years. After this, in 1860 Stirling returned to Edinburgh—his address there was 4 Laverockbank Road, Trinity, Edinburgh—which then became his permanent residence until the end of his life, and where he wrote on the philosophy of Georg Wilhelm Friedrich Hegel (1770–1831) and many other subjects. The primary result of his comprehensive Hegel studies was his influential work The Secret of Hegel (2 vols., 1865).

One of Stirling's other major philosophical works—Philosophy and Theology (1890) (consisting of his 20 Gifford Lectures, delivered at the University of Edinburgh in 1889–1890)—focuses not on Hegelian philosophical topics, but on Charles Darwin's evolutionary theories.

Frederick Copleston (A History of Philosophy vol. VII, p. 12) wrote: "we may be inclined to smile at J. H. Stirling's picture of Hegel as the great champion of Christianity".

Stirling died in Edinburgh and is buried in Warriston Cemetery on the north side of the city. His grave lies in the centre of the long, upper section north of the vaults, facing south onto an east–west path.

== Selected publications ==
Other works:

- Sir William Hamilton (1865)
- The Secret of Hegel (1865)
- Text-book to Kant (1881)
- Philosophy and Theology (1890) (Gifford Lectures)
- Darwinianism: workmen and work (1894) – In this work Stirling recollects views on Darwin's theory of evolution, including that of Thomas Brown and others, stating: "it is the theory involved which it is also my endeavour, with all honour, to refute." Stirling states "it is not by any means necessary that an evolutionist should be also a Darwinian."
- What is Thought? or the Problem of Philosophy (1900)
- The Categories (1903).

More concerned with literature:

- Jerrold, Tennyson, and Macaulay (1868)
- Burns in Drama (1878)
- Philosophy in the Poets (1885).
