= Maria Theresa Kemble =

Austrian-born English actress, singer, dancer & comic playwright (1774–1838)

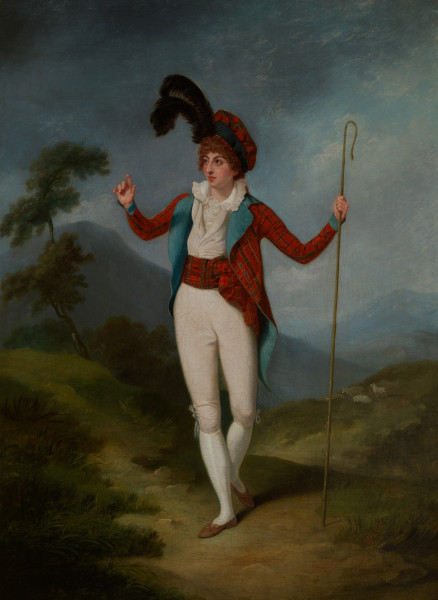
- Maria Theresa Kemble as The Good Shepherd in a painting by Samuel De Wilde
- Born: 17 January 1774; Vienna
- Died: 3 September 1838 (aged 64); Addlestone, Surrey, England
- Occupations: dancer, singer and actor
- Spouse: Charles Kemble

Maria Theresa Kemble (1774–1838), née Marie Thérèse Du Camp, was an Archduchy of Austria-born English actress, singer, dancer and comic playwright on the stage. She was the wife of actor Charles Kemble and mother of Fanny Kemble, part of the Kemble acting dynasty.

== Early life ==
She was the daughter of Jeanne Dufour and George De Camp who were both performers. She was born in Vienna, Archduchy of Austria, Holy Roman Empire, on 17 January 1774 and brought to England where she appeared as Cupid at the age of six years old in Jean-Georges Noverre's ballet at the Opera House. She spoke no English and learned the language herself although she was tutored in other subjects. Two years later she appeared in La Colombe by Madame de Genlis. After she appeared at the Royal Circus she was employed by George Colman's Haymarket Theatre to appear in The Nosegay on 14 June 1786 with James Harvey D'Egville in the presence of the royal family. On 21 June she danced in The Polonaise, and on 7 July she appeared in a ballet entitled Jamie's Return with James Harvey and his brother George D'Egville. She was then secured by Thomas King for the Drury Lane Theatre, where on 24 October 1786, she played Julie, a small part in John Burgoyne's Richard Cœur de Lion. Her father had left her in England for Germany, where he died while she was still young; she picked up English, and played juvenile and small parts.

== Stage success ==
In 1792 she was employed as a leading actor to play Macheath in the Beggar's Opera at the Haymarket. She went on to appear in Miss in her Teens (David Garrick), The Count of Narbonne, the Quaker, and The Recruiting Officer. She created the first version of Lindamira in Richard Cumberland's The Box-Lobby Challenge and she stood in for the singers Nancy Storace and Anna Maria Crouch. She was the first Judith in The Iron Chest by George Colman the Younger. On 8 June 1796 she appeared in the breeches part of Patie (The Good Shepherd) at Drury Lane. She was captured in this role by the artist Samuel De Wilde and that painting is now in the collection of the Garrick Club. At the Haymarket, 15 July 1797, she was the original Caroline Dormer in The Heir at Law (George Colman the Younger), and in the same year she played Portia and Desdemona, followed at Drury Lane by Katherine in Katherine and Petruchio, and Hippolito in Kemble's alteration of The Tempest.

For her benefit, on 3 May 1799, she gave at Drury Lane her own unprinted play of First Faults. In 1799 William Earle printed a piece called Natural Faults, and accused Miss De Camp in the preface of having stolen his plot and characters. In a letter to the Morning Post of 10 June, she denied the charge and asserted that her play was copied by Earle from recitation. John Genest considered that Earle's statement 'has the appearance of truth'. Lady Teazle, Miss Hoyden, Lady Plyant in The Double Dealer (William Congreve), Hypolita in She Would and She Would Not, Little Pickle, and Dollalolla in Tom Thumb were some of the other parts she played before her marriage to Charles Kemble, which took place 2 July 1806.

== As a Kemble ==
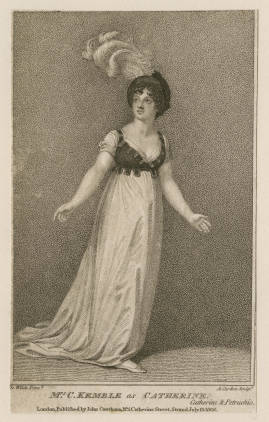
As Catharine in David Garrick's Catharine and Petruchio

Accompanying the Kembles to Covent Garden, she made her first appearance there, on 1 October 1806, as Maria in the Citizen, and remained there for the rest of her acting career. Her comedy, The Day after the Wedding, or a Wife's First Lesson, 1808, was played at Covent Garden for the benefit of her husband, who enacted Colonel Freelove, 18 May 1808; she was Lady Elizabeth Freelove. Match-making, or 'Tis a Wise Child that knows its own Father, played for her own benefit on the 24th, is also assigned to her. It was not acted a second time, nor printed.

She also assisted her husband in the preparation of Deaf and Dumb. Among the parts now assigned to her were Ophelia, Mrs. Sullen, Violante, Beatrice in Much Ado about Nothing, Mrs. Ford, and Juliana in the Honeymoon, and the like. In 1813–14 and 1814–15, she was not engaged. On 12 December 1815, she made an appearance as Lady Emily Gerald in her own comedy Smiles and Tears, or the Widow's Stratagem.

== Last years ==
She then disappeared from the stage until 1818–19, when she played Mrs. Sterling, and was the original Madge Wildfire in Daniel Terry's musical version of Heart of Midlothian. For her own and her husband's benefit, she played Lady Julia in 'Personation,’ 9 June 1819, when she retired. A solitary reappearance was made at Covent Garden on the occasion of the début as Juliet of her daughter Fanny Kemble, 5 October 1829, when she played Lady Capulet.

She died at Chertsey, Surrey, on 3 September 1838.

== Family members ==
Besides Fanny Kemble, her daughter Adelaide Kemble was known on the stage. A son John Mitchell Kemble was a classical scholar.

Her brother Vincent De Camp occasionally acted fops and footmen at Drury Lane and the Haymarket, and was subsequently an actor and a cowkeeper in America. Her sister Adelaide, an actress in a line similar to her own, was popular in Newcastle upon Tyne.

== Selected roles ==
- Judith in The Iron Chest by George Colman the Younger (1796)
- Elinor Bloomly in Cheap Living by Frederick Reynolds (1797)
- Leonora in The Inquisitor by Thomas Holcroft (1798)
- Elinor in Cambro-Britons by James Boaden (1798)
- Lady Selina Vapour in Fashionable Friends by Mary Berry (1802)
- Miss Betty in The Land We Live In by Francis Ludlow Holt (1804)
- Fanny in A Prior Claim by Henry James Pye (1805)
- Mrs Templeton in Education by Thomas Morton (1813)
