= John Till Allingham =

English dramatist

John Till Allingham (c. 1776 – 28 February 1812) was an English dramatist.

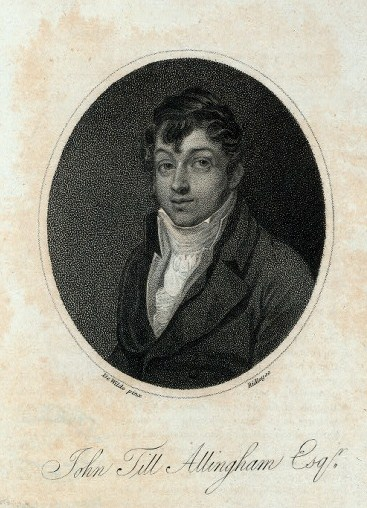
John Till Allingham

== Life ==
Allingham was the son of a wine merchant in the City of London. He was brought up to the profession of the law, but is known as a successful and prolific dramatist.

Allingham died aged 36, at his father's house in Islington, and was buried in March 1812 at Bunhill Fields. In his Life of John Kemble (1825), James Boaden suggested his early death was caused by drinking.

== Works ==
Allingham's afterpiece, Fortune's Frolic, first produced at Covent Garden Theatre in 1799, long enjoyed popularity, and the leading character Robin Roughhead wasplayed by celebrated actors. His second play, Tis all a Farce, was produced at the Haymarket Theatre in 1800. Others of his works were: The Marriage Promise, a comedy with music by Michael Kelly, produced at Drury Lane Theatre 1803; Mrs. Wiggins, a farce in two acts, produced at the Haymarket in 1803; Hearts of Oak, a comedy, produced at Drury Lane in 1803; The Weathercock, a farce, produced at Drury Lane in 1805; The Romantic Lover, a comedy, produced at Covent Garden in 1806, and "damned", wrote John Genest.

Plays attributed to Allingham include: Who wins? or the Widow's Choice, a musical farce, produced at Covent Garden in 1808; Independence, or the Trustee, produced at Covent Garden in 1809; Transformation, or Love and Law, a musical farce, produced by the Drury Lane company at the Lyceum Theatre in 1810. Much of the success of Allingham's plays was due to the ability and popularity of Charles Mathews. George Henry Harlow painted a portrait of the actor as Mr. Wiggins in the farce of Mrs. Wiggins.
