= Francis Ludlow Holt =

English legal and dramatic author

Francis Ludlow Holt (1780 – 29 September 1844) was a legal and dramatic author.

== Life ==
Francis Ludlow is cited as born in 1780, the son of the Rev. Ludlow Holt, LL.D., of Watford, Hertfordshire, the author of some sermons published in 1780–1. A baptism is cited for 1779 in Watford. He was elected a king's scholar of Westminster School in 1794, and matriculated at Christ Church, Oxford, in 1798.

He was called to the bar at the Middle Temple 27 January 1809, and went on the northern circuit. He became a king's counsel and bencher of the Inner Temple in 1831, and treasurer of that inn in 1840. He was an Exchequer Bill Loan Commissioner, and was vice-chancellor of the county palatine of Lancaster from 1826 till his death. He received the appointment from Lord Bexley, on the retirement of Sir Giffin Wilson. He was succeeded by Horace Twiss, esq. Q.C.

Holt died on 29 September 1844 at Earls Terrace, Kensington. In 1809, by licence he married Jane Bell, a niece of John Bell, proprietor of Bell's Weekly Messenger, of which he was for many years the principal editor.

== Holt's writings ==
- The Law and Usage of Parliament in Cases of Privilege and Contempt, 1810.
- The Law of Libel, 1812, 1816;

reviewed by Lord Brougham in ‘Edinburgh Review,’ September 1816; American edition 1818. Republished in 2005.

- Reports of Cases ruled and determined at Nisi Prius, in the Court of Common Pleas., and on the Northern Circuit, from the Sittings after Trinity Term, 55 Geo. III, 1815, to the Sittings after Michaelmas Term, 58 Geo.III, 1817, both inclusive, vol. i (the only one published), 1818.
- A System of the Shipping and Navigation Laws of Great Britain, and of the Laws relating to Merchant Ships and Seamen and Maritime Contracts, 1st edition, 1820; 2nd edition, 1824.
- The Bankrupt Laws, as established by the New Act, 6 Geo. IV, c.16, 1827.

He wrote also one or two dramatic pieces, and published in 1804 a comedy,

- The Land We Live In,

which was successful as a literary work (it reached a third edition in 1805), though, according to Genest unsuitable to the stage, the author having sacrificed plot to dialogue; it was acted at Drury Lane on one night in 1805.
