= James Rosco =

British actor (??–1761)

James Rosco (died 1761) was a British stage actor. His name is also written as James Roscoe.

From 1722 to 1729 he acted at the Smock Alley Theatre in Dublin. Moving to London he appeared at a variety of venues, including the Drury Lane and Haymarket Theatres before spending several years as a member of Henry Giffard's company at the Goodman's Fields Theatre near the Tower of London. After Giffard's attempt to challenge the patent theatres was ended by the Licensing Act he joined Covent Garden where he performed regularly between 1737 and 1748. He was generally a secondary performer at the company, scarcely playing leading roles. In 1739 he was accidentally stabbed during a performance of Mariamne.

While at Covent Garden, he appeared during the summer at the Jacobs Well Theatre in Bristol playing leading roles. He eventually settled in the city and established an academy there with his wife Anne Barbara Roscoe. Their daughter briefly appeared at Drury Lane in 1757 before acting in Bristol at Jacobs Well, in Cork at the Theatre Royal and Dublin at the Smock Alley and Crow Street Theatres. Following her father's death she abandoned her acting career and assisted her mother with the running of the academy.

== Selected roles ==
- Pheron in Timoleon (1730)
- Crowdero in Bayes's Opera (1730)
- Southampton in The Fall of the Earl of Essex (1731)
- Heli in Scanderbeg (1733)
- Lord Manly in A Tutor for the Beaus (1737)
- Old Severn in The Prodigal Reform’d (1738)
- Gloucester in Edward and Eleonora (1739)

== Bibliography ==
- Highfill, Philip H, Burnim, Kalman A. & Langhans, Edward A. A Biographical Dictionary of Actors, Actresses, Musicians, Dancers, Managers, and Other Stage Personnel in London, 1660-1800: Garrick to Gyngell. SIU Press, 1978.
