= 1722 in literature =

This article contains information about the literary events and publications of 1722.

== Events ==
- January 27 – Daniel Defoe's novel Moll Flanders is published anonymously in London under its full title: The Fortunes and Misfortunes of the Famous Moll Flanders, &c. Who was Born in Newgate, and during a Life of continu'd Variety for Threescore Years, besides her Childhood, was Twelve Year a Whore, five times a Wife (whereof once to her own Brother), Twelve Year a Thief, Eight Year a Transported Felon in Virginia, at last grew Rich, liv'd Honest, and died a Penitent. Written from her own Memorandums.
- March – Defoe's A Journal of the Plague Year is published under the initials H. F., purporting to be an eyewitness account of the Great Plague of London in 1665.
- August 24 – Francis Atterbury, Bishop of Rochester, is arrested in his deanery and confined in the Tower of London, accused of leading the Jacobite "Atterbury Plot" in support of the pretender to the British throne, James Francis Edward Stuart of the House of Stuart.
- September–October – Voltaire and Jean-Baptiste Rousseau meet and quarrel at Brussels.
- September 23 – Lille Grønnegade Theatre opens in Copenhagen, the first Danish-language theater open to the public. The company consists of immigrant French actors who previously worked in the Danish royal theatre, with Ludvig Holberg as house dramatist. The comedies he writes for them this year include Jean de France.
- October 11 – Ten-year-old Jean-Jacques Rousseau is abandoned by his father, Isaac, who flees Geneva to avoid prosecution.
- November 7 – Sir Richard Steele's "sentimental comedy" The Conscious Lovers (loosely based on Terence) opens at the Theatre Royal, Drury Lane, London with an initial run of eighteen consecutive nights.
- December – Defoe's picaresque novel Colonel Jack, sharing many plot elements with Moll Flanders, is published.
- Construction of a new building for the Hof-Bibliothek ("Imperial Library") in Vienna, the modern-day Austrian National Library, begins.
- Edmund Bolton's Hypercritica is published, a century after it was written.
- Sharafuddin Ali Yazdi's Zafar Nama ("History of Timur", 1425) is published in a French translation by François Pétis de la Croix (d. 1713).
- William Wood (ironmaster) commences the minting (in London) of copper halfpence and farthings under patent for circulation in Ireland which will be the subject of the first of Jonathan Swift's Drapier's Letters.

== New books ==
=== Prose ===
- John Arbuthnot - Mr. Maitland’s account of inoculating the small-pox
- Penelope Aubin (fiction)
  - The Life and Amorous Adventures of Lucinda
  - The Noble Slaves
- Phanuel Bacon – The Kite
- Daniel Bellamy – The Cambro-Britannic Engineer
- Thomas Cooke – Marlborough (written after his death)
- Samuel Croxall – Fables of Aesop and Others, newly done into English with an Application to each Fable
- Daniel Defoe
  - Moll Flanders
  - A Journal of the Plague Year
  - Colonel Jack
  - Due Preparations for the Plague
  - Religious Courtship
- John Dennis – A Defence of Sir Fopling Flutter
- Johann Georg Gichtel – Theosophia Practica
- William Hamilton – The Life and Heroick Actions of the Renoun'd Sir William Wallace
- Eliza Haywood – The British Recluse (fiction)
- Hildebrand Jacob – Bedlam
- Allan Ramsay – Fables and Tales
- Jean de la Roque – Voyage en Syrie et au mont Liban
- Sir Charles Sedley – Works
- William Sewel – The History of the Rise, Increase, and Progress of the Christian People Called Quakers
- Jonathan Swift – A Satirical Elegy on the Death of a Late Famous General (satire on Marlborough, written before his death)
- Matthew Tindal – A Defence of Our Present Happy Establishment
- Isaac Watts – Death and Heaven
- William Wollaston – The Religion of Nature Delineated
- Antonio de Zamora – Comedias nuevas

=== Children ===
- Samuel Croxall – Fables of Aesop and Others

=== Drama ===
- Henry Carey – Hanging and Marriage
- Susanna Centlivre – The Artifice
- Ludvig Holberg
  - Jean de France eller Hans Frandsen
  - Jeppe paa Bjerget eller den forvandlede Bonde (Jeppe of the Hill, or The Transformed Peasant)
  - Mester Gert Westphaler
  - Den Politiske Kandestøber (The Political Tinker)
  - Den Vægelsindede (The Weathervane)
- Pierre de Marivaux – La Surprise de l'amour
- Ambrose Philips – The Briton
- William Phillips – Hibernia Freed
- Archibald Pitcairne – The Assembly, or Scotch Reformation
- Richard Steele – The Conscious Lovers
- James Sterling – The Rival Generals
- John Sturmy –
  - The Compromise
  - Love and Duty
- John Williams – Richmond Wells

=== Poetry ===
- Thomas Parnell – Poems on Several Occasions
- Elizabeth Thomas – Miscellany Poems on Several Subjects

== Births ==
- February 24 – John Burgoyne, English dramatist, army officer and politician (died 1792)
- February 26 – Mary Leapor, English working-class poet (died 1746)
- April – Joseph Warton, English poet and critic (died 1800)
- April 11 – Christopher Smart, English poet (died 1771)
- September 22 – John Home, Scottish dramatist (died 1808)
- October 4 – Dominic Schram or Schramm, German theologian (died 1797)
- Unknown dates
  - John Brown of Haddington, Scottish theologian (died 1787)
  - Paisius of Hilendar, Bulgarian historian and clergyman, early figure in the Bulgarian National Revival (died 1773)
  - Waris Shah, Punjabi Muslim poet (died 1798)

== Deaths ==
- January 23 – Henri de Boulainvilliers, French historian (born 1658)
- March 11 – John Toland, Irish philosopher (born 1670)
- August – Robert Sibbald, Scottish antiquary (born 1641)
- September 11 – Johann Michael Heineccius, German theologian (born 1674)
- September 18 – André Dacier, French scholar (born 1651)
- December 26 – Jan František Beckovský, Czech historian and translator (born 1658)
