= Anna Marcella Giffard =

Irish actress (1707–1777)

- Born: Anna Marcella "Nancy" Lyddal; 1707
- Died: 21 January 1777 (aged 69–70)
- Occupation: stage actress
- Spouse: Henry Giffard (m. 1728)

Anna Marcella Giffard (1707–1777) was an Irish stage actress.

== Life ==
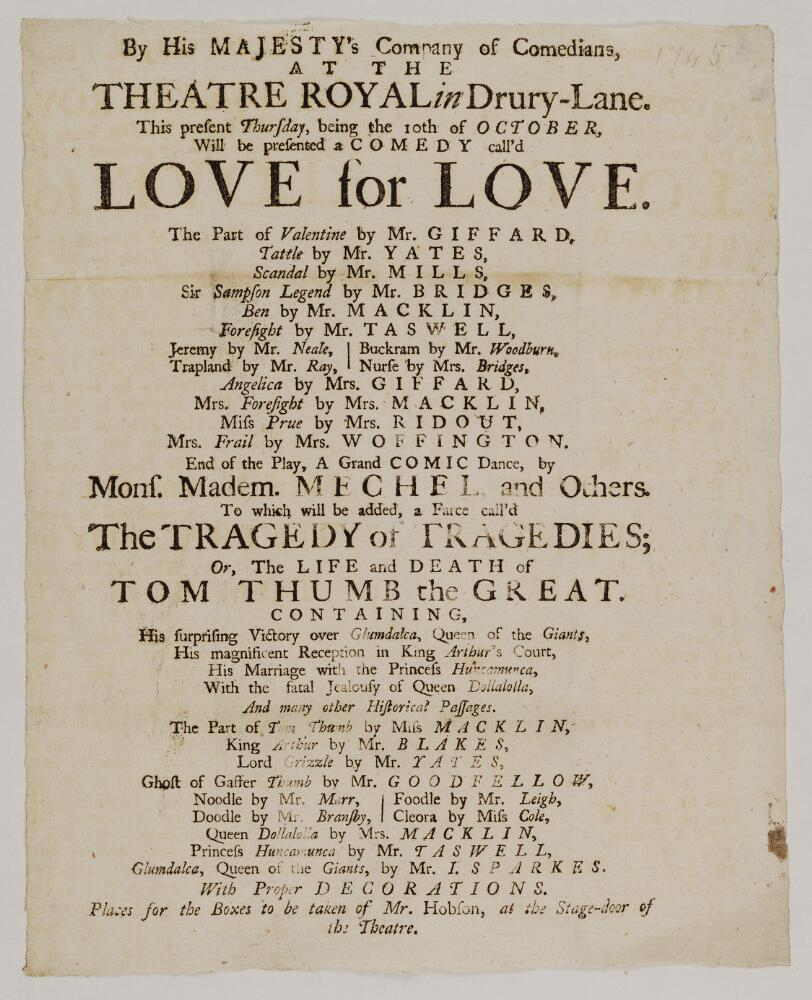
Playbill of Drury Lane Theatre, 10 October 1745, announcing Love for love &c. featuring Giffard

Anna Marcella Giffard was a member of the Lyddal acting family of Dublin, and began appearing herself at the Smock Alley Theatre under the name of Nancy Lyddal in the 1720s. In around 1728 she married the English actor Henry Giffard who had been acting at Smock Alley for some years. He had previously been married to Mary Lyddal, probably Anna Marcella's sister, with whom he had two children including William Giffard. After the marriage she was generally styled Mrs Giffard on playbills.

She accompanied her husband to London in 1729 and frequently appeared alongside him over the coming years. She made her British debut at the Goodman's Fields Theatre, and this became a base for the couple after Henry took over management of the company and attempted to turn it into the third major London theatre, despite operation without a patent. The Licensing Act 1737 largely ended this attempt, and in subsequent years they played in many theatres around Britain and Ireland as well as the Drury Lane, Covent Garden and Haymarket Theatres. They may have had a daughter, who died aged 2, in the 1730s. Along with her husband she left the stage in October 1748 and retired to live in Brentford.

Giffard died on 21 January 1777, and is buried with her husband in Brentford. Their gravestone was inscribed: "Beneath this stone lie the remains of Henry Giffard, Esq. late of this parish, who died October 20, 1772, aged 78 years: also here lieth the body of Anna Marcella Giffard, wife of the abovementioned Henry Giffard, Esq. who departed this life January 21, 1777, aged 70 years."

Her sister Sarah Hamilton was also an actress who worked extensively on the Irish and British stage. Her nephew William Hamilton also became an actor.

== Selected roles ==
- Mominia in The Orphan (1729)
- Matilda in The Widow Bewitched (1730)
- Mrs Sprightly in The Fashionable Lady (1730)
- Lady Essex in The Fall of the Earl of Essex (1731)
- Deamira in Scanderbeg (1733)
- Beleyda in The Parricide (1736)
- Henrietta Maria in King Charles I (1737)
- Julia in The Independent Patriot (1737)
- Pinup in A Tutor for the Beaus (1737)
- Semandra in The Fatal Retirement (1739)
- Emira in Mustapha (1739)
- Charlotte in Love the Cause and Cure of Grief (1743)
- Palmira in Mahomet the Imposter (1744)
- Clara in The Astrologer (1744)
- Martian in Regulus (1744)
- Lady Fanciful in The Provoked Wife (1748)
