= Henrietta Morgan =

British stage actress

Henrietta Morgan or Henrietta Maria Morgan was a British stage actress of the eighteenth century. She was billed as Mrs Morgan.

She was married to the actor Robert Morgan, appearing alongside him at Lincoln's Inn Fields Theatre where they were part of John Rich's company. She also appeared at summer venues such as William Pinkethman's Richmond Theatre and Bartholomew Fair. During the early 1730s the couple acted at the Goodman's Fields Theatre in Whitechapel where Henry Giffard was attempting to challenge the traditional patent theatres.

== Selected roles ==
- Belinda in Richmond Wells by John Williams (1722)
- Lavinia in Titus Andronicus by William Shakespeare (1722)
- Mrs Saracen in The Compromise by John Sturmy (1722)
- Pindress in Love and a Bottle by George Farquhar (1724)
- Tippet in The Bath Unmasked by Gabriel Odingsells (1725)
- Frances in The Female Fortune Teller by Charles Johnson (1726)
- Dorothy Fribble in Epsom Wells by Thomas Shadwell (1726)
- Hillaria in Tunbridge Walks by Thomas Baker (1726)
- Mrs Slammekin in The Beggar's Opera by John Gay (1728)
- Sophia in Frederick, Duke of Brunswick-Lunenburgh by Eliza Haywood (1729)
- Lady Nottingham in The Fall of the Earl of Essex by James Ralph (1731)

== Bibliography ==
- Joncus, Berta & Barlow, Jeremy. The Stage's Glory: John Rich (1692–1761). University of Delaware, 2011.
- Straub, Kristina, G. Anderson, Misty and O'Quinn, Daniel . The Routledge Anthology of Restoration and Eighteenth-Century Drama. Taylor & Francis, 2017.
