= Scanderbeg (play) =

1733 play

- Written by: William Havard
- Original language: English
- Genre: Tragedy

Premiere
- Date premiered: 15 March 1733
- Place premiered: Goodman's Fields Theatre

Scanderbeg, A Tragedy is a 1733 tragedy by the British writer William Havard. It is based on the life of Skanderbeg who led a rebellion against the Ottoman Empire in the fifteenth century. Another play about him George Lillo's The Christian Hero was produced two years later.

It was staged at the Goodman's Fields Theatre in Whitechapel, which was at that time attempting to challenge the dominant two patent theatres at Drury Lane and Covent Garden by producing new and ambitious works. The original cast included Henry Giffard as Scanderberg, William Giffard as Abdalla, Dennis Delane as Amurat, Richard Winstone as Selim, James Rosco as Heli, Charles Hulett as Hali-Vizem, Anna Marcella Giffard as Deamira and Sarah Hamilton as Zaida.

== Bibliography ==
- Baines, Paul & Ferarro, Julian & Rogers, Pat. The Wiley-Blackwell Encyclopedia of Eighteenth-Century Writers and Writing, 1660-1789. Wiley-Blackwell, 2011.
- Burling, William J. (1992). A Checklist of New Plays and Entertainments on the London Stage, 1700-1737. Fairleigh Dickinson Univ Press. ISBN 978-0-8386-3451-6.
