= The Fall of the Earl of Essex =

Play by James Ralph

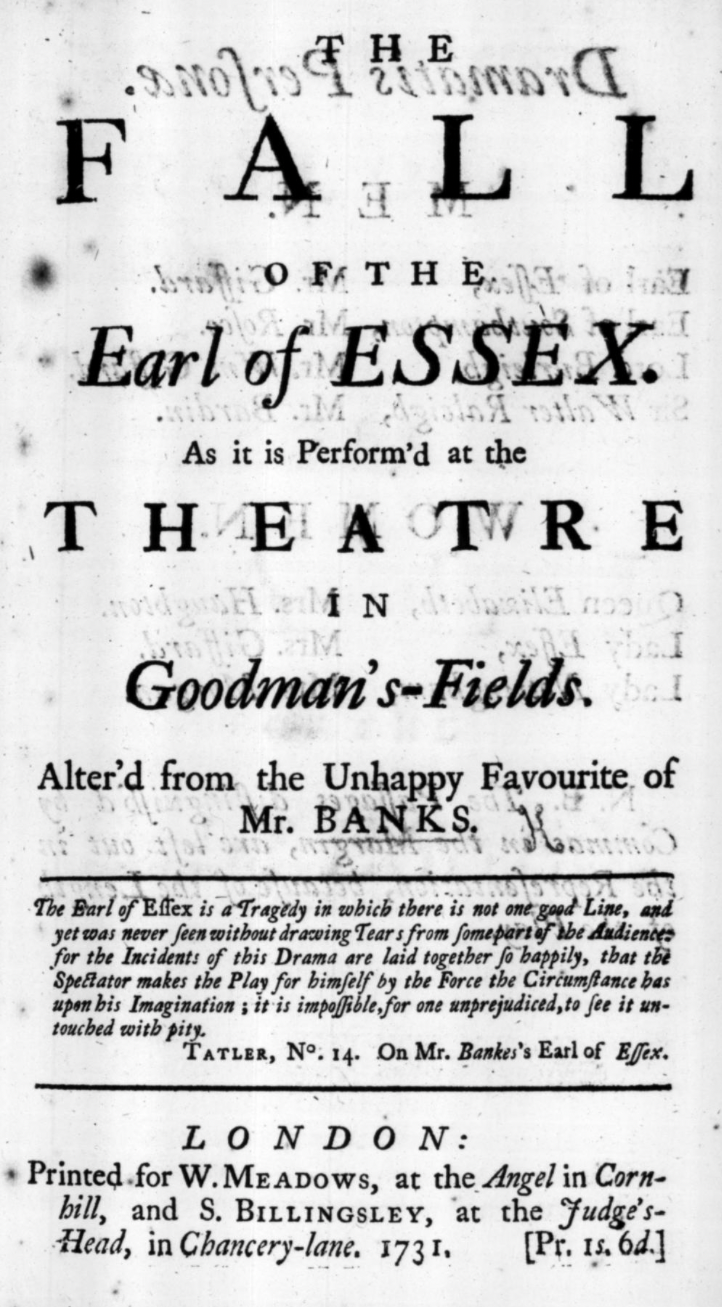
- Original language: English
- Written by: James Ralph
- Genre: Tragedy

Premiere
- Date: 1 February 1731
- Place: Goodman's Fields Theatre

The Fall of the Earl of Essex is a 1731 tragedy by James Ralph. An adaptation of Restoration play The Unhappy Favourite (1681) by John Banks, it premiered at Goodman's Fields Theatre on 1 February 1731 and ran for four consecutive performances. The text was issued anonymously later that year. Ralph retained Banks’s plot but rewrote much of the dialogue, removed or softened several sensational episodes (including the “box on the ear”), altered stage business (the Queen addresses Essex on his first entrance; the scaffold is shown and Essex’s body is brought on), and regularised the verse with longer, reflective speeches and act-closing similes. Staged at a “little” theatre, the play has been read within the opposition-minded climate of the early 1730s; while direct identification with Sir Robert Walpole has been judged speculative, some scholars view the piece as obliquely anti-Walpole. Critical opinion has been cool: nineteenth-century commentator John Genest called the alteration dull (though better than Banks’s original), and later critics have likewise judged it unsuccessful. When Goodman's Fields returned to the Essex story in 1734 and 1745, bills styled the mainpiece as Banks’s original (The Unhappy Favourite / The Earl of Essex) rather than Ralph’s adaptation.

== Background and production ==
The play opened at Goodman's Fields Theatre in Whitechapel on 1 February 1731; bills styled it “A New Tragedy” and credited Ralph. Banks’s The Unhappy Favourite (1681) had already fixed the Essex–Elizabeth story for later dramatists, and standard histories discuss Ralph’s reliance on that model. The venue—one of London’s “little” theatres rather than a patent theatre—showed a mixed but sometimes oppositional repertoire in the early 1730s.

== Synopsis ==
At the court of Elizabeth I the council, led by Burleigh, presses charges against the Earl of Essex for exceeding orders in Ireland by negotiating a truce. The Queen, torn between favour and duty, confronts Essex on his return but commits him to custody.

Essex’s allies, notably the Earl of Southampton, lament his fall. The case proceeds, and the Queen’s indecision persists. In a private interview she gives Essex a token, promising that if it is returned to her in extremity she will grant whatever he asks, and he is sent to the Tower. Sir Walter Raleigh and Burleigh further harden opinion against him, while Lady Essex petitions for mercy.

In the prison, Lady Nottingham offers to intercede. Essex refuses to sue for his own life but entrusts her with the Queen’s token and asks above all for clemency toward Southampton and Lady Essex. Nottingham, spurned, withholds the token and tells the Queen that no such appeal was made. Stung by this report, the Queen orders immediate execution.

On the scaffold hung with black, Southampton is reprieved, while Essex exhorts him to live and protect his family. Essex goes to his death offstage; the consequences of Nottingham’s deception and the Queen’s grief close the action.

== Performance history ==
It was performed at Goodman's Fields on 1, 2, 3, and 4 February 1731. The third night (3 February) was advertised as a benefit for the author.

Nicoll lists further performances on 16 April 1734 and on 2 January, 29 January, and 13 December 1745; however, the London Stage Database records those Goodman's Fields dates under Banks’s The Unhappy Favourite (styled The Earl of Essex) rather than Ralph’s adaptation.

== Cast ==
=== Men ===
- Earl of Essex — Mr. Giffard
- Earl of Southampton — Mr. Rosco
- Lord Burleigh — Mr. Wm. Giffard
- Sir Walter Raleigh — Mr. Barden

=== Women ===
- Queen Elizabeth — Mrs. Haughton
- Lady Essex — Mrs. Giffard
- Lady Nottingham — Mrs. Morgan

=== Other ===
- Prologue — Spoken by Mr. Giffard
- Epilogue — Spoken by Mrs. Giffard

== Publication ==
The play was printed in octavo in 1731, issued anonymously, under the title The Fall of the Earl of Essex… Alter’d from the Unhappy Favourite of Mr. Banks. Ralph did not attach his name to the edition; the preface adopts a self-deprecating tone, hoping that Banks’s “Genius” might elevate his own “Tinsel.”

== Adaptation ==
The adaptation retains Banks’s plot but pares back episodes judged melodramatic. It drops the well-known “box on the ear” scene between Elizabeth and Essex, has the Queen address Essex on his first entrance, shows the scaffold in Act V, and brings on Essex’s body in a coffin; much of the dialogue was newly written.

In technique and style, asides are replaced with direct exchanges; brisk repartee yields to longer, measured speeches. The verse is regularised and more reflective, with set pieces on ambition, court life, and withdrawal from the world (e.g., Essex’s wish to “leave all Courts … [and] herd with milder Monsters”). Acts often close with an extended simile in rhymed couplets; Act II ends with a seafaring conceit.

The printed paratexts state the adapter’s aims: the prologue praises Banks for having “sketch’d the bold Design … [and] mark’d the Passions strong,” yet says the colours were “rudely laid,” and adds that the adapter “lays his own imperfect Schemes aside” and “invokes the Genius of the Bards of Old.” The title page quotes Richard Steele’s 1709 estimate of Banks.

== Themes and political interpretation ==
Although the text does not name contemporary figures, modern scholarship reads it within the opposition-leaning theatrical climate of the early 1730s. Goodman's Fields showed no fixed partisan line, yet it staged opposition pieces in this period.

On The Fall of the Earl of Essex specifically, Loftis argues that identifying its courtiers with Walpole “requires imagination,” but notes clear analogies (Essex as a queen’s favourite; Walpole and Queen Caroline) and lines that in 1731 would have sounded like an arraignment of Walpole’s peace policy—for example Burleigh’s charge that Essex “betray’d his Charge … commens’d a Truce against [the Queen’s] absolute Command.”

In this context, Elizabeth R. McKinsey characterizes Ralph’s adaptation as “opaquely anti-Walpole.”

== Reception ==
In 1832, John Genest described the alteration as “very dull,” though “on the whole … better than the original piece.” In 1962, J. M. Bastian judged the adaptation “not successful.”

Ralph’s adaptation was performed on four consecutive nights at Goodman's Fields (1–4 February 1731). When the Essex story returned to the theatre in 1734, listings styled the mainpiece as The Unhappy Favourite; in 1745 they styled it as The Earl of Essex, rather than Ralph’s adaptation.

== Bibliography ==
- London Stage Database. "01 February 1731 @ Goodman's Fields: The Fall of the Earl of Essex". London Stage Database. University of Oregon.
- Bastian, J. M. (May 1962). "James Ralph's Second Adaptation from John Banks". Huntington Library Quarterly. 25 (3): 181–188. doi:10.2307/3816116. JSTOR 3816116.
- Burling, William J. (1992). A Checklist of New Plays and Entertainments on the London Stage, 1700–1737. Rutherford, N.J.; London; Cranbury, N.J.: Fairleigh Dickinson University Press; Associated University Presses. ISBN 0838634516.
- Genest, John (1832). Some Account of the English Stage from the Restoration in 1660 to 1830. Vol. 3. Bath: H. E. Carrington. hdl:2027/hvd.32044100891365.
- Ralph, James (1731). The Fall of the Earl of Essex. As it is Perform’d at the Theatre in Goodman's-Fields. Alter’d from The Unhappy Favourite of Mr. Banks. London: Printed for W. Meadows, at the Angel in Cornhill; and S. Billingsley, at the Judge's-Head, in Chancery-Lane.
- Highfill, Philip H.; Kalman A. Burnim; Edward A. Langhans (1973–1993). A Biographical Dictionary of Actors, Actresses, Musicians, Dancers, Managers & Other Stage Personnel in London, 1660–1800. Carbondale, IL: Southern Illinois University Press.
- Loftis, John (1963). The Politics of Drama in Augustan England. Oxford: Clarendon Press. OCLC 326835.
- McKinsey, Elizabeth R. (1973). "James Ralph: The Professional Writer Comes of Age". Proceedings of the American Philosophical Society. 117 (1): 57–66. JSTOR 985948.
- Nicoll, Allardyce (1929). A History of Early Eighteenth Century Drama: 1700–1750 (2nd ed.). Cambridge: Cambridge University Press.
