= 1771 in literature =

This article contains information about the literary events and publications of 1771.

== Events ==
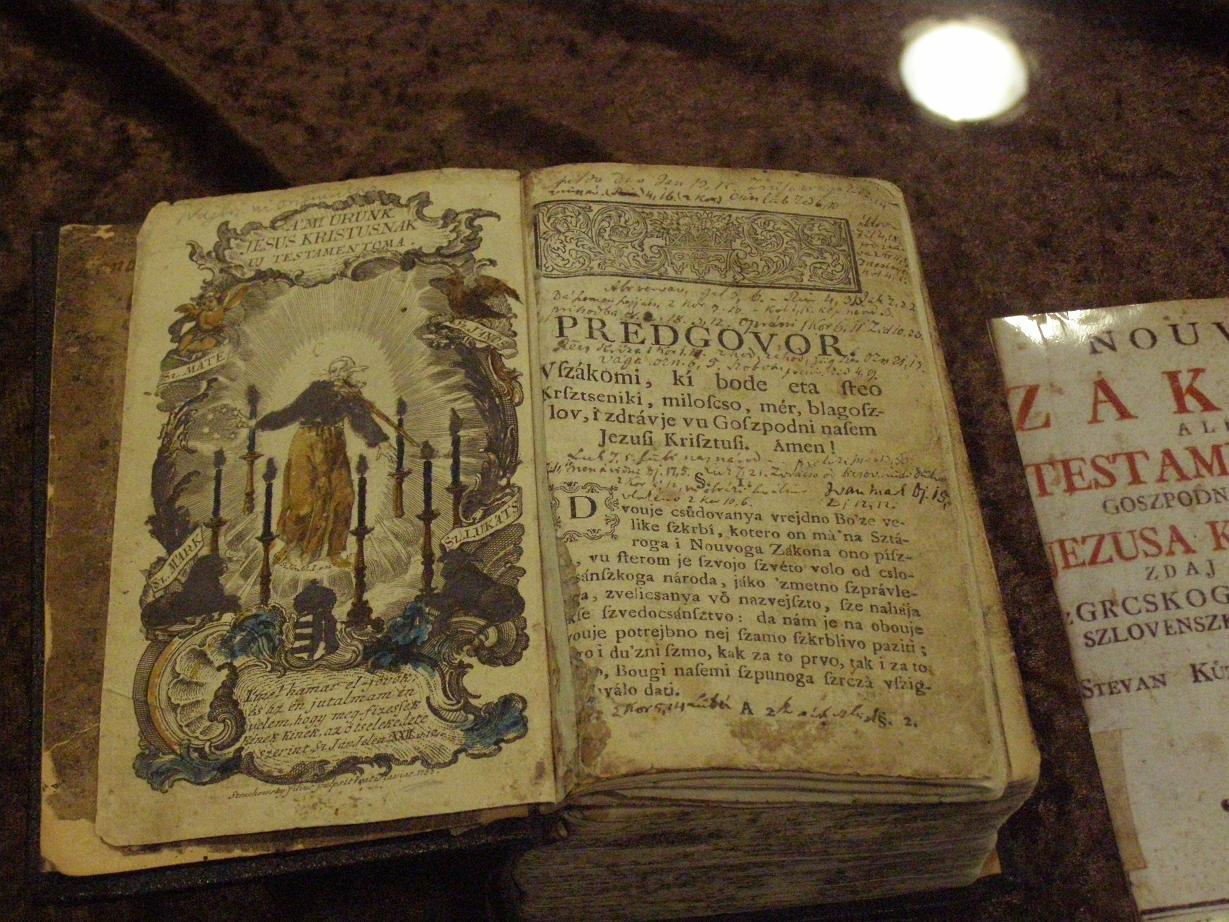
Original edition of the Nouvi Zákonin the Murska Sobota library

- April 9 – Pedro Correia Garção is arrested and committed to prison by Sebastião de Melo, Marquis of Pombal.
- unknown dates
  - Henry Mackenzie's The Man of Feeling inaugurates the fashion for sentimentalism in novels.
  - Sophie von La Roche's Geschichte des Fräuleins von Sternheim: Von einer Freundin derselben aus Original-Papieren und andern zuverläßigen Quellen gezogen ("History of Lady von Sternheim"), completed at Bönnigheim and published this year in Leipzig edited by the author's cousin Christoph Wieland in 2 volumes, is, within the tradition of German literature, the first significant novel by a woman, the first epistolary novel and the first "sentimental" novel.
  - Matthias Claudius begins editing and publishing the newspaper Der Wandsbecker Bothe.
  - Slovene literature: The Nouvi Zákon, a translation of the New Testament into the Prekmurje Slovene language by István Küzmics, the Hungarian Slovene writer and evangelical pastor, is published (in Halle).
  - Archbishop Richard Robinson founds the Armagh Public Library in the north of Ireland.

== New books ==
=== Fiction ===
- Sophia Briscoe – Miss Melmoth; or the New Clarissa
- Claude Joseph Dorat – Les Sacrifices de l'amour
- Elizabeth Griffith – The History of Lady Barton
- John Langhorne – Letters to Eleonara
- Henry Mackenzie – The Man of Feeling
- Louis-Sébastien Mercier – L'An 2440, rêve s'il en fut jamais
- Tobias Smollett – The Expedition of Humphry Clinker
- Sophie von La Roche – Geschichte des Fräuleins von Sternheim

=== Children ===
- Christopher Smart – Hymns for the Amusement of Children

=== Drama ===
- Isaac Bickerstaffe – He Wou'd If He Cou'd
- José Cadalso – Sancho García
- Richard Cumberland – The West Indian
- Denis Diderot – Le Fils Naturel
- Carlo Goldoni – Le Bourru Bienfaisant
- Samuel Foote – The Maid of Bath
- Hugh Kelly – Clementina
- George Alexander Stevens – The Fair Orphan
- Alexander Sumarokov – Dmitri the Usurper

=== Poetry ===
- James Beattie – The Minstrel
- James Cawthorn – Poems
- John Langhorne – The Fables of Flora
- Thomas Percy – The Hermit of Warkworth
- Henry James Pye – The Triumph of Fashion
- Christoph Martin Wieland – Der neue Amadis

=== Non-fiction ===
- John Brown – Description of the Lake of Keswick
- Charles Burney – The Present State of Music in France and Italy
- John Dalrymple – Memoirs of Great Britain and Ireland
- John William Fletcher – Five Checks to Antinomianism
- Oliver Goldsmith – The History of England
- Samuel Johnson – Thoughts on the Late Transactions Respecting Falkland's Islands
- Martinez de Pasqually – Traité sur la réintégration des êtres dans leur première propriété, vertu et puissance spirituelle divine (approximate year)
- Thomas Pennant – A Tour in Scotland
- Richard Price – Observations on Reversionary Payments
- William Smellie – Encyclopædia Britannica (in 100 volumes)
- Emanuel Swedenborg – True Christian Religion
- John Wesley – Works
- Arthur Young – The Farmer's Tour Through the East of England
- Real Academia Española – Gramática

== Births ==
- January 17 – Charles Brockden Brown, American novelist (died 1810)
- February 5 – John Lingard, English historian and Catholic priest (died 1851)
- March 23 – Lumley Skeffington, English playwright and fop (died 1850)
- June 13 – Sydney Smith, English wit and cleric (died 1845)
- August 15 – Sir Walter Scott, Scottish novelist and poet (died 1832)
- November 4 – James Montgomery, Scottish-born poet and hymnist (died 1854)
- December 25 – Dorothy Wordsworth, English diarist and poet (died 1855)
- December 26 – Heinrich Joseph von Collin, Austrian dramatist (died 1811)

== Deaths ==
- January 11 – Jean-Baptiste de Boyer, Marquis d'Argens, French philosopher (born 1704)
- February 2 – John Lockman, English historian, poet and translator (born 1698)
- March 9 – Henry Pemberton, English man of letters and physician (born 1694)
- May 21 – Christopher Smart, English poet (born 1722)
- July 30 – Thomas Gray, English poet (born 1716)
- September 17 – Tobias Smollett, Scottish novelist, journalist and translator (born 1721)
- October 14 – John Gill, English theologian (born 1697)
- December 26 – Claude Adrien Helvétius, French philosopher (born 1715)
- probable – Luis Galiana y Cervera, Spanish theologian, philologist and writer (born 1740)
