= Sarah Hamilton (actress) =

Irish actress

- Born: Sarah Myrton Lydall (or Lyddal) c. 1711; Ireland
- Died: c. 1776
- Occupation: Actress

Sarah Hamilton (fl. 1727-1776) was an Irish stage actress and singer of the eighteenth century.

== Life ==
Born into the Lydall acting family of Dublin, she was the sister of Mary (Molly) and Anna Marcella Lydall. Hamilton acted in the Smock Alley Theatre company in Dublin for a number of years, alongside her husband named Hamilton, and was billed as Mrs Hamilton. In 1732 she debuted in London at the Goodman's Fields Theatre run by her brother-in-law Henry Giffard, appearing in The Beaux Stratagem. She generally specialised in comedies, but also played more serious roles in tragedies.

From 1734 she began playing Colombine, beginning with John Frederick Lampe's opera Britannia at the King's Theatre in Haymarket. In 1737 she and her husband moved with Giffard to the Lincoln's Inn Fields Theatre, beginning by playing Philidel in a revival of King Arthur. The Licensing Act 1737 severely damaged the family's career prospects and after a spell at Drury Lane she returned with her husband to the Smock Alley. They were later acting in Edinburgh for many years.

She had at least five children who pursued stage careers including Catherine, Henrietta, Myrton, James, and William.

== Selected roles ==
- Cherry in The Beaux Stratagem (1732)
- Sylvia in The Old Bachelor (1732)
- Rose in The Recruiting Officer (1732)
- Zaida in Scanderbeg (1733)
- Amanthe in The Parricide (1736)
- Dulcissa in The Independent Patriot (1737)
- Eliza in The Plain Dealer (1738)
- Philoten in Marina (1738)
