= 1736 in literature =

This article contains information about the literary events and publications of 1736.

== Events ==
- Charles Rivington founds a company of London booksellers known as the New Conger.

== New books ==
=== Prose ===
- Anonymous – The Life of Marianne (fiction, translation of Pierre Carlet de Chamblain de Marivaux)
- Joseph Addison – The Works of Petronius Arbiter (translation)
- John Armstrong – The Oeconomy of Love
- Thomas Bayes – An Introduction to the Doctrine of Fluxions, and a Defence of the Mathematicians Against the Objections of the Author of the Analyst
- Isaac Hawkins Browne – A Pipe of Tobacco
- Joseph Butler – Analogy of Religion
- Thomas Carte – Life of James Duke of Ormonde
- William Rufus Chetwood – The Voyages. . . of William Owen Gwin Vaughan
- Claude Prosper Jolyot de Crébillon – Les Égarements du cœur et de l'esprit (Strayings of the Heart and Mind), part one
- Francis Drake - Eboracum
- John Gyles – Memoirs of Odd Adventures, Strange Deliverances, &c. in the Captivity of John Gyles, Esq
- Eliza Haywood – Adventures of Eovaai (later as The Unfortunate Princess)
- Muhammad ibn Abd-al-Wahhab – Kitab at-tawhidt
- Isaac Newton – Method of Fluxions
- Elizabeth Singer Rowe – The History of Joseph
- William Stukeley – Palaeographia Sacra
- James Thomson – Britain
- William Warburton – The Alliance Between Church and State (an answer to Benjamin Hoadly from the year before)
- Leonard Welsted – The Scheme and Conduct of Providence
- Diego de Torres Villarroel
  - Los desahuciados del mundo y de la gloria (The Deathly Illness of the World and of Glory)
  - Historia de historias

=== Drama ===
- Henry Carey – The Honest Yorkshireman
- Colley Cibber – Papal Tyranny in the Reign of King John
- Mr. Connolly – The Connoisseur
- Elizabeth Cooper – The Nobleman
- Henry Fielding – Pasquin
- Aaron Hill –
  - Alzira
  - Zara
- Samuel Johnson – All Alive and Merry
- James Sterling – The Parricide

=== Poems ===
- Stephen Duck – Poems on Several Occasions
- William Melmoth – Two Epistles of Horace Imitated
- Alexander Pope – The Works of Alexander Pope vols iii–iv
- Voltaire – Le Mondain

== Births ==
- May 10 – George Steevens, English Shakespearean editor and hoaxer (died 1800)
- June 25 – John Horne Tooke, English controversialist and cleric (died 1812)
- October 27 – James Macpherson, Scottish writer, poet and politician (died 1796)
- Unknown dates
  - Robert Jephson, Irish dramatist and politician (died 1803)
  - James Ridley (Sir Charles Morell), English novelist and story writer (died 1765)

== Deaths ==
- January 8 – Jean Le Clerc, Swiss theologian (born 1657)
- February 9 – Barnaby Bernard Lintot, English bookseller and publisher (born 1675)
- March 18 – Jacob Tonson, English bookseller and publisher (born c. 1655)
- April 30 – Johann Albert Fabricius, German scholar and bibliographer (born 1668)
- July 16 – Thomas Yalden, English poet and translator (born 1670)
