= Edward and Eleonora =

Play by James Thomson

- 1775 edition
- Original language: English
- Written by: James Thomson
- Genre: Tragedy
- Setting: Jaffa, Palestine, 1271

Premiere
- Date: 18 March 1775
- Place: Covent Garden Theatre, London

Edward and Eleonora is a 1739 tragedy by the British writer James Thomson. Originally due to be performed at Covent Garden in 1739, the play was banned by the censor, the Lord Chamberlain Charles FitzRoy, Duke of Grafton, under the recent Licensing Act. This happened late into rehearsals in March 1739. The original cast was intended to feature Dennis Delane as Edward, Christiana Horton as Eleanor, James Rosco as Gloucester and Lacy Ryan as the Sultan.

Thomson was closely identified with the Patriot Whigs opposed to the government of Robert Walpole. His play, ostensibly about Edward I and his wife Eleanor during the Ninth Crusade, was viewed as an attack on Walpole's policies and personal corruption. Because the play begins with Edward as a patriotic Prince of Wales compared favourably to his father Henry III, similarities were drawn with the strained relationship between George II and his son Frederick, Prince of Wales who was a backer of the Patriot Whigs. Thomson dedicated the published version of the play to Frederick's wife Augusta.

The play finally premiered at Covent Garden on 18 March 1775, many years after Thomson's death. The cast included Thomas Hull, Robert Bensley, Ann Street Barry and Isabella Mattocks. It ran for seven performances.

== Bibliography ==
- Baines, Paul & Ferarro, Julian & Rogers, Pat. The Wiley-Blackwell Encyclopedia of Eighteenth-Century Writers and Writing, 1660-1789. Wiley-Blackwell, 2011.
- Nicoll, Allardyce. A History of Early Eighteenth Century Drama: 1700-1750. CUP Archive, 1927.
- Wilson, Brett D. A Race of Female Patriots: Women and Public Spirit on the British Stage, 1688-1745. Lexington Books, 2012.
