= The Independent Patriot =

1737 play

- Original language: English
- Written by: Francis Lynch
- Genre: Comedy

Premiere
- Date: 12 February 1737
- Place: Lincoln's Inn Fields Theatre

The Independent Patriot is a 1737 comedy play by Francis Lynch.

The play mocks the European tourism of the British elite while on the Grand Tour. The work is dedicated to Lord Burlington, known for his support for Palladian architecture, by suggesting he had more usefully used his time abroad.

It was produced at the Lincoln's Inn Fields Theatre by Henry Giffard's company which had recently moved there from Goodman's Fields Theatre.

== Original cast ==
- Alderman Export - Mr Lion
- Sanguine - Thomas Wright
- Medium - Benjamin Johnson
- Gripacre - William Giffard
- Addle - Henry Giffard
- Bamwell - Mr Barden
- Roseband - William Havard
- Spruce - Henry Woodward
- Lady Warble - Mrs Roberts
- Julia - Anna Marcella Giffard
- Dulcissa - Sarah Hamilton
- Jacqueline - Charlotte Charke
- Charlotte - Mrs Hughes

== Bibliography ==
- Black, Jeremy. Culture in Eighteenth-Century England: A Subject for Taste. A&C Black, 2007.
- Burling, William J. A Checklist of New Plays and Entertainments on the London Stage, 1700-1737. Fairleigh Dickinson Univ Press, 1992.
- Nicoll, Allardyce. A History of Early Eighteenth Century Drama: 1700-1750. CUP Archive, 1927.
