= Thomas Odell =

Thomas Odell may refer to:

- Tom Odell (born 1990), British singer-songwriter
- Thomas Odell (writer) (1691–1749), English playwright
