= Thomas Davies (bookseller) =

Scottish bookseller and author

Thomas Davies (c. 1713 – 1785) was a Scottish bookseller and author. He studied at the University of Edinburgh, and was for some years on the stage, but having been ridiculed by Churchill in The Rosciad, Davies gave up acting and opened a bookshop in Covent Garden. It was here that in 1763 he introduced Boswell to Dr. Johnson, who was Davies' close friend, and to whom he dedicated his edition of the works of Massinger. Davies wrote a successful Life of Garrick (1780), which passed through four editions, and Dramatic Miscellanies (three volumes, 1783–84).

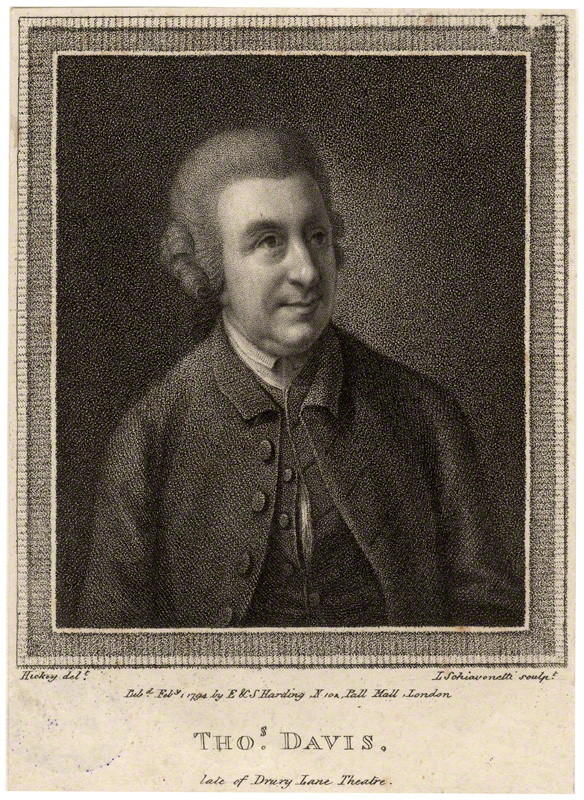
Thomas Davies, 1794 engraving by Luigi Schiavonetti, after Thomas Hickey

== Life ==
He was born about 1713, and was educated at the University of Edinburgh (1728 and 1729). In 1736 he appeared in George Lillo's Fatal Curiosity at the Haymarket, then under Henry Fielding's management. He then tried bookselling, but failed and returned to the stage. On 24 January 1746 he attempted the part of Pierre in Venice Preserved, which was performed for his benefit at Covent Garden. He next became a travelling actor, and married Susannah, the daughter of an actor at York named Joseph Yarrow.

Davies performed at Edinburgh, where he was accused of monopolising popular parts, and then at Dublin. In 1753 he was engaged with his wife at Drury Lane, with some success as understudies. In 1761 appeared Churchill's Rosciad, in which the line "He mouths a sentence as curs mouth a bone" which, according to Samuel Johnson, drove Davies from the stage. Davies apparently left the stage in 1762, when he again set up as a bookseller at 8 Russell Street, Covent Garden. Here in 1763 he introduced James Boswell (who had been introduced to him by Samuel Derrick) to Johnson.

Davies was a member of a booksellers' club which met at the Devil Tavern, Temple Bar, and then at the Grecian Coffee-house, where he used to read parts of his Life of Garrick and where Johnson's Lives of the Poets was suggested. Davies died on 5 May 1785, and was buried in St. Paul's, Covent Garden. Johnson punished him for an indiscretion by observing contemptuously that Jonathan Swift's Conduct of the Allies might have been written by Tom Davies, but in two letters written at the end of his life expressed his gratitude for the care of Davies and his wife.

== Publisher ==
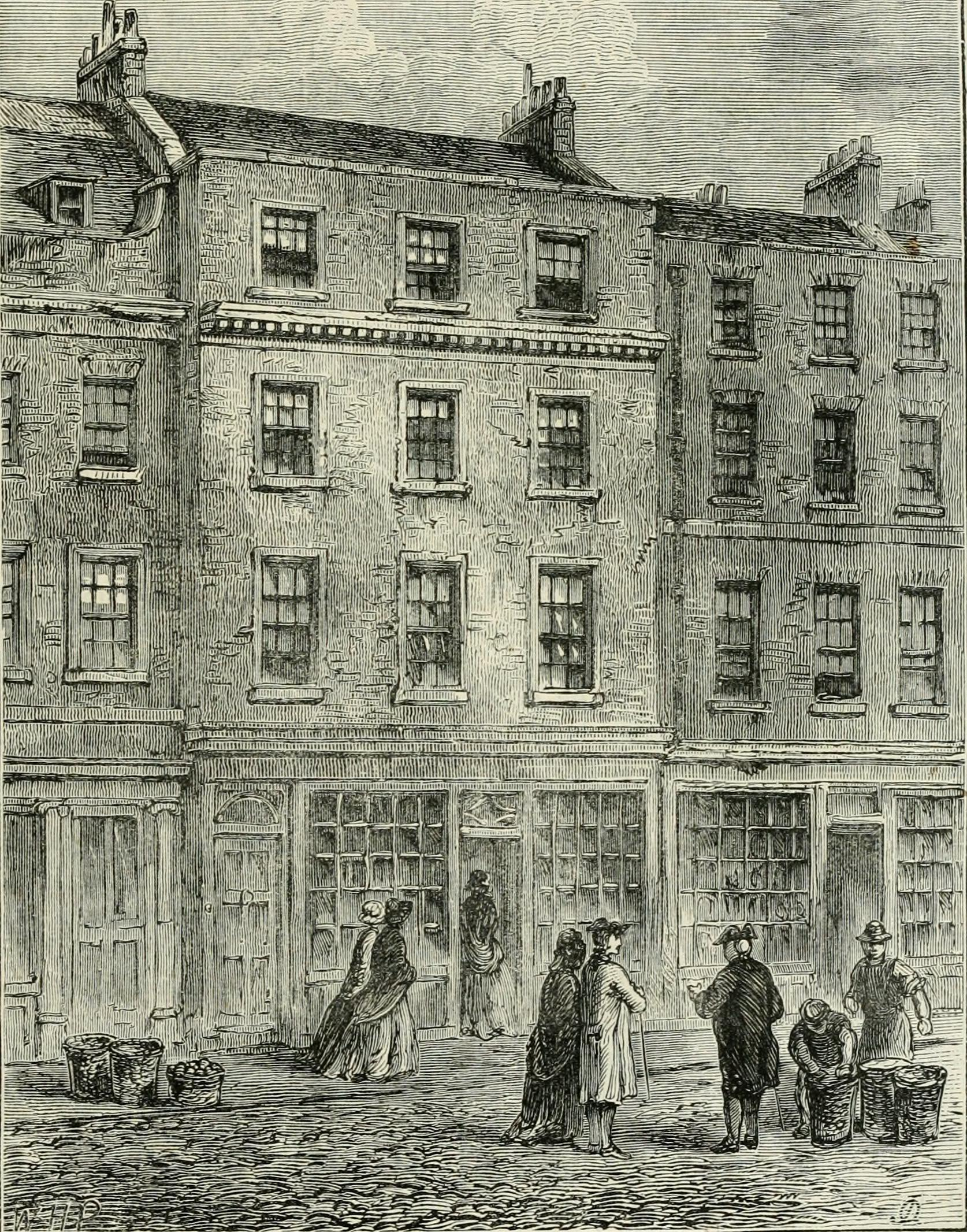
Davies shop at 8 Russell Street

Davies republished the works of authors including William Browne (1772), Sir John Davies (1773), John Eachard (1774), George Lillo (1775), and Philip Massinger, with some account of his life and writings prefixed (1779). In 1773 he published Miscellaneous and Fugitive Pieces, in two volumes, and advertised them as by the author of The Rambler. Johnson's writings, without authority, formed the bulk of this collection; but Johnson was disarmed by Davies's good-nature and professions of penitence.

In 1778 Davies became bankrupt, and Johnson exerted his influence on Davies's behalf, collected money to buy back his furniture, and induced Richard Brinsley Sheridan to give him a benefit at Drury Lane. Davies then appeared for the last time as Fainall in William Congreve's The Way of the World. Next year Davies dedicated his Massinger to Johnson. Johnson later encouraged Davies to write the life of Garrick, supplied the first sentence, and gave help with Garrick's early years. The book appeared in 1780, passed through four editions, and brought money and reputation to the author.

Encouraged by this success, he published in 1785 Dramatic Miscellanies, consisting of critical observations on several plays of Shakespeare, with a review of his principal characters and those of various eminent writers, as represented by Mr. Garrick and other celebrated comedians. With anecdotes of Dramatic Poets, Actors, &c., 3 vols., 1785. A second edition appeared the same year.
