= Henry Woodward (English actor) =

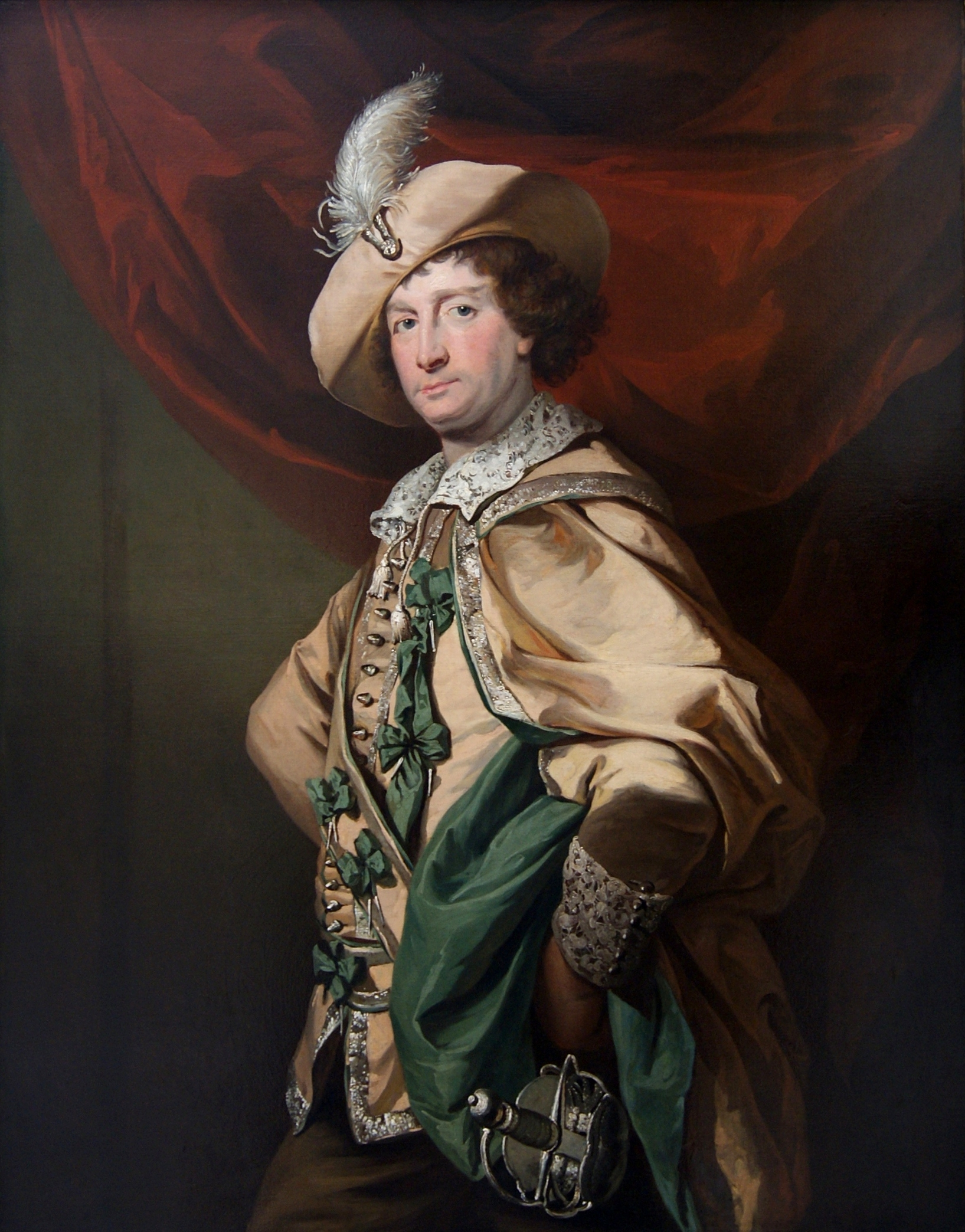
Henry Woodward as Petruchio in Catharine and Petruchio

Henry Woodward (2 October 1714 – 17 April 1777) was an English actor, among the most famous in his day for comedy roles.

== Early life and career ==
Woodward was the eldest son of a tallow chandler in the borough of Southwark, London, and intended for his father's occupation. He attended Merchant Taylors' school from 1724 to 1728. After his father's failure in business, Woodward joined the troupe of John Rich, whose stage name was "Lun", at Lincoln's Inn Fields, playing in January 1729 in The Beggar's Opera as the Beggar and Ben Budge. During the season the performance was repeated fifteen times, and Woodward, thoroughly stage-struck, remained with Rich, who instructed him in harlequin and other characters.

From October 1730 he appeared at Goodman's Fields Theatre, where he remained until 1736. After the company moved to Lincoln's Inn Fields, Woodward appeared in January 1737 as Harlequin Macheath in The Beggars' Pantomime, or the Contending Columbines. The authorship of this is ascribed to "Lun junior", i.e. Woodward, who dedicated to Kitty Clive and Susannah Maria Cibber the printed version of 1736.

== Drury Lane and Dublin ==
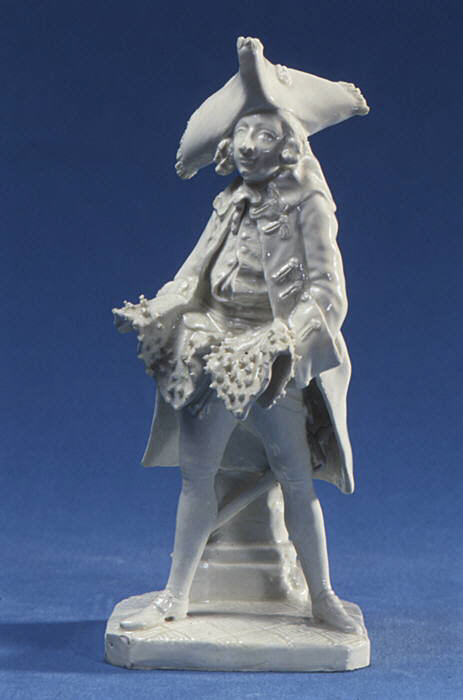
Woodward as the Fine Gentleman in David Garrick's farce Lethe. Bow porcelain factory figure, 1750.

In 1737, at the end of the season, the theatre was closed, and Woodward went to Drury Lane, appearing in January 1738 as Feeble in Henry IV Part 2. He remained at Drury Lane until 1747, playing many parts in comedy, and adding to his repertory some fifty characters.

Engaged by Thomas Sheridan for Smock Alley Theatre, Dublin, Woodward made his first appearance there in September 1747 as Marplot in Susanna Centlivre's The Busie Body. As Marplot he came out again in September 1748 at Drury Lane. He repeated some of his Dublin successes, and gave in March 1749 his own unprinted interlude, Tit for Tat.

Between 1751 and 1756 Woodward produced and probably acted in several unprinted pantomimes of his own. These all displayed gifts of construction and invention, and were highly popular. Some of them had previously been seen in Dublin. Marplot in Lisbon was produced at Drury Lane in March 1754. It was a compression, with some slight alterations by Woodward, of Susanna Centlivre's Marplot, a continuation of The Busie Body, and was seen again in Dublin and at Covent Garden.

At Drury Lane he remained until 1758. At the end of the season of 1757–58 Woodward finally severed his connection with Drury Lane. His last engagement had been prodigal of interest and incident. He was David Garrick's right-hand man, and divided with him the empire over comedy. His Mercutio, when Garrick and Barry in Romeo and Juliet divided the town, had been an unsurpassable triumph. Arthur Murphy said, concerning the performance, that "no actor ever reached the vivacity of Woodward". His performance of Bobadill in Ben Jonson's Every Man in His Humour was pronounced "wonderful" by Tate Wilkinson.

== Crow Street Theatre, Dublin ==
Woodward's inducement to leave Drury Lane had been a tempting but, as it proved, delusive, offer from Spranger Barry. Barry had counted on the support of Charles Macklin in opening a new theatre in Dublin. Macklin proving recalcitrant, he turned to Woodward, who had saved £6,000, and Woodward, after some hesitation, entered on the scheme at the persuasion of Barry, whom Rich declared capable of "wheedling a bird from the tree and squeezing it to death in his hand".

In October 1758 Crow Street Theatre, built by subscription, was opened under the new management, Woodward speaking a prologue but not acting. In January 1760 Samuel Foote's The Minor was produced. The Dublin management was not a success, and by 1762 Woodward had lost half his savings. In this year the joint-managers, who in 1761 had opened a new theatre in Cork, quarrelled, recriminated, and dissolved partnership, Woodward returning to London.

== Covent Garden ==
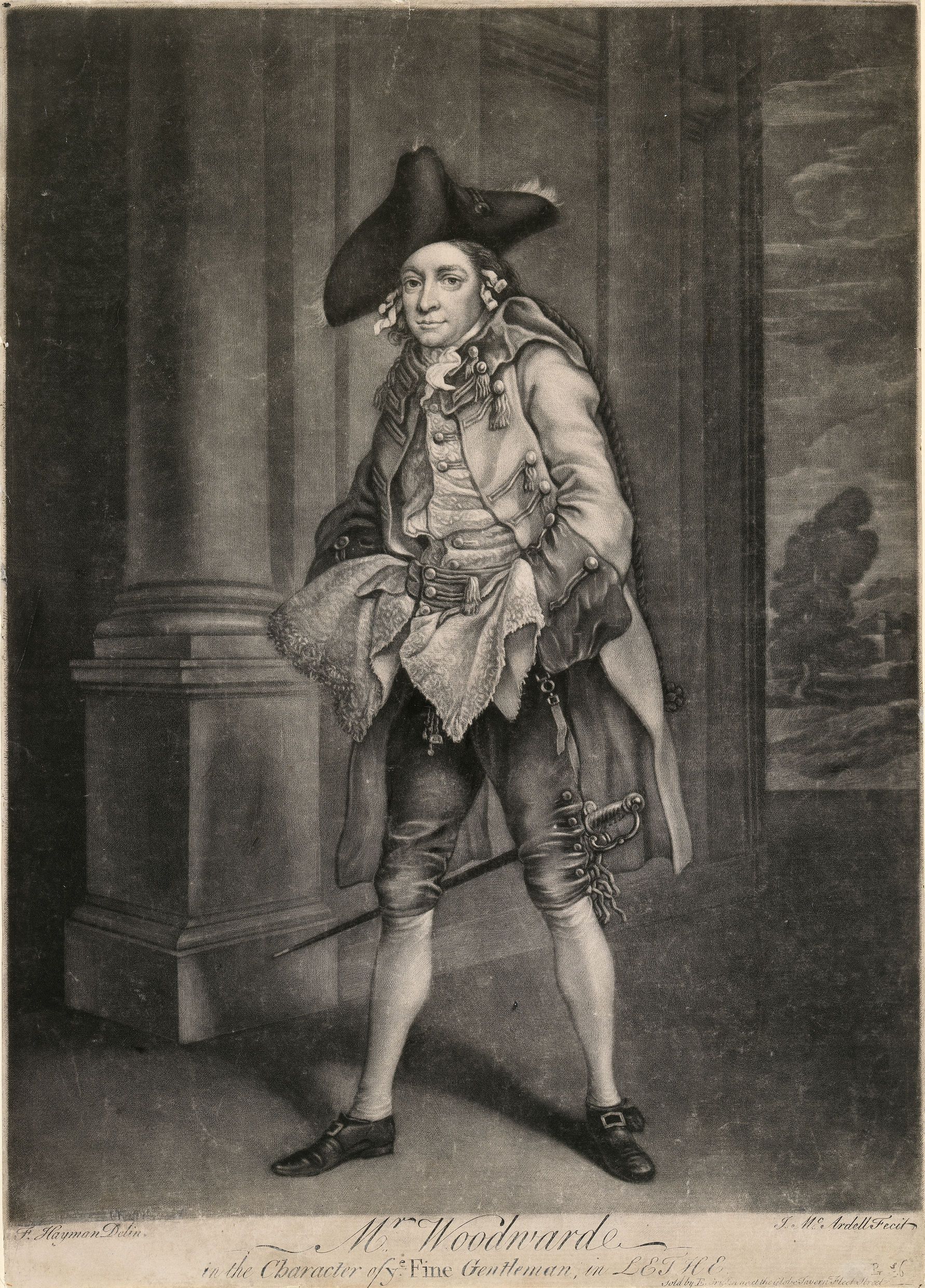
Woodward as the Fine Gentleman in Lethe

On reappearing in London at Covent Garden in Marplot, in October 1763, Woodward, who had spoken in Dublin many prologues of his own writing, delivered one entitled "The Prodigal's Return"; this occasioned a vexatious charge of "ingratitude" when in 1764 he revisited Dublin. At Covent Garden he played some of the parts in which he had been seen in Ireland. In November 1770, as Marplot in The Busie Body he made under Samuel Foote his first appearance in Edinburgh, playing a round of characters. On his homeward journey he acted under Tate Wilkinson in York. Still under Foote, he was on 26 June 1771 at the Haymarket the first Sir Christopher Cripple in Foote's The Maid of Bath.

Back at Covent Garden, where he remained, he was the first Tardy in An Hour before Marriage, in January 1772. He was also seen as Jodelet in his alteration of William Davenant's The Man's the Master. in November 1773. Woodward's last appearance was in January 1777, when he played Stephano in The Tempest. On 17 April he died at his house, Chapel Street, Grosvenor Place, and was buried in the vaults of St George's, Hanover Square. Mrs Woodward predeceased her husband, and Woodward spent the last ten years of his life with George Anne Bellamy. To her he left the bulk of his estate, which, however, she never succeeded in obtaining.

== Commentary ==
John Joseph Knight wrote: "Woodward has had few equals in comedy. His figure was admirably formed and his expression so composed that he seemed qualified rather for tragedy or fine gentlemen than the brisk fops and pert coxcombs he ordinarily played. He was unable, however, to speak a serious line with effect, but so soon as he had to charge his face with levity, and to display simulated consequence, brisk impertinence, or affected gaiety, he was the most engaging, consequential, and laughable of actors.... He received the highest terms of any comic actor of the day. His claims to rank as a dramatist, except as regards his pantomimes, are trivial, his work containing next to nothing original."

== Selected roles ==
- Issouf in The Parricide by James Sterling (1736)
- Young Manly in A Tutor for the Beaus by John Hewitt (1737)
- Spruce in The Independent Patriot by Francis Lynch (1737)
- Jack Meggot in The Suspicious Husband by Benjamin Hoadly (1747)
- Don Lewis in Gil Blas by Edward Moore (1751)
- Dick in The Apprentice by Arthur Murphy (1756)
- Block in The Reprisal by Tobias Smollett (1757)
- Young Philpot in The Citizen by Arthur Murphy (1761)
- Young Brumpton in The School for Guardians by Arthur Murphy (1767)
- Careless in The Oxonian in Town by George Colman the Elder (1767)
- Lofty in The Good-Natur'd Man by Oliver Goldsmith (1768)
- Captain Ironsides in The Brothers by Richard Cumberland (1769)
- Sir Christopher Cripplegate in The Maid of Bath by Samuel Foote (1771)
- General Gauntlet in The Duellist by William Kenrick (1773)
