= William Hamilton (actor) =

Irish actor

William Hamilton was an Irish stage actor of the eighteenth century.

He was the son of the actress Sarah Hamilton. His aunt was the actress Anna Marcella Giffard. Along with his brother James, he first appeared on stage in January 1735 at the Goodman's Fields Theatre in London as a child actor. They continued to appear together in London at the Lincoln's Inn Fields Theatre and Theatre Royal, Drury Lane until 1739 when they returned with their parents to Dublin and worked at the Smock Alley Theatre.

His activities are unclear for a while after this, but as an adult he no longer performed with his brother. It is likely the same William Hamilton who performed in Edinburgh in 1749 and then became part of the Smock Alley company between 1749 and 1758. From 1766 he was back in London where he appeared at the King's Theatre and then joined Samuel Foote's company at the Haymarket Theatre. He split his time over the next few years appearing at the Haymarket in the summer and Covent Garden in the winter. He was reportedly the initial choice to play Tony Lumpkin in the original production of Oliver Goldsmith's She Stoops to Conquer (1773) but lost the part due to a lack of attention. After this his prominence declined, and he made his final appearances in both theatres in 1774. He then began touring again and apart from appearances in Edinburgh and Belfast his later years are unknown. It is possible he was still alive in 1805, and one report had him supported in his final years by his niece.

== Selected roles ==
- Duke of Gloucester in King Charles I (1737)
- Laird in A Trip to Portsmouth (1773)

== Bibliography ==
- Highfill, Philip H, Burnim, Kalman A. & Langhans, Edward A. A Biographical Dictionary of Actors, Actresses, Musicians, Dancers, Managers, and Other Stage Personnel in London, 1660–1800: Garrick to Gyngell. SIU Press, 1978.
