= Fatal Curiosity =

Play by George Lillo

- Original language: English
- Written by: George Lillo
- Genre: Tragedy

Premiere
- Date: 21 March 1737
- Place: King's Theatre, Haymarket

Fatal Curiosity is a 1737 verse drama tragedy by the British writer George Lillo. It is also known by the alternative title Guilt Its Own Punishment.

The original cast included Thomas Davies and Charlotte Charke.

Implicitly, the work attacks the government and Imperial strategy of Robert Walpole, who had then been prime minister for over a decade. It was shown with Henry Fielding's The Historical Register as an afterpiece. Soon afterwards Walpole brought forward a Licensing Act 1737 to clamp down on theatrical criticism of the government.

== Bibliography ==
- Baines, Paul & Ferarro, Julian & Rogers, Pat. The Wiley-Blackwell Encyclopedia of Eighteenth-Century Writers and Writing, 1660-1789. Wiley-Blackwell, 2011.
- Burling, William J. A Checklist of New Plays and Entertainments on the London Stage, 1700-1737. Fairleigh Dickinson Univ Press, 1992.
