= The Widow Bewitched =

1730 play

- Original language: English
- Written by: John Mottley
- Genre: Comedy

Premiere
- Date: 8 June 1730
- Place: Goodman's Fields Theatre

The Widow Bewitched is a 1730 comedy play by the British writer John Mottley.

The original Goodman's Fields cast included William Giffard as Colonel Courtly, Henry Giffard as Stanza and Anna Marcella Giffard as Matilda.

== Bibliography ==
- Burling, William J. A Checklist of New Plays and Entertainments on the London Stage, 1700-1737. Fairleigh Dickinson Univ Press, 1992.
- Nicoll, Allardyce. History of English Drama, 1660-1900, Volume 2. Cambridge University Press, 2009.
