= The Apprentice (play) =

Arthur Murphy play

The Apprentice is a 1756 afterpiece by Irish dramatist Arthur Murphy. This two-act farce, which was Murphy's first play, satirized London's amateur spouting clubs. Like George Villiers, 2nd Duke of Buckingham's The Rehearsal (1671), the play relies, for much of its humor, on impersonation and personal satire in the acting.

== Performance history ==
The farce was first performed on 2 January 1756 at the Theatre Royal, Drury Lane. From its premier until 1800, The Apprentice was performed 223 times. Comedian and pantomimist Henry Woodward first performed the title character, Dick, and remained popular in the part for years. Later in the century, John Bannister took on the part.

== Plot ==
Act I introduces Wingate, a character described in the dramatis personae as "a passionate old Man, particularly fond of Money and Figures, and involuntarily uneasy about his Son, Dick." Wingate apprentices his son to the apothecary, Gargle, and wants him to complete his apprenticeship and marry Gargle's daughter, Charlotte. Dick, however, wants to be an actor, and he attends the meetings of a spouting club three times a week. Because acting without royal authority was illegal, Dick's theatrical activities regularly get him in trouble. We learn, for instance, that he was recently arrested as a vagabond, but released because of his father's respectability. In the first act, Gargle and Wingate confer about how to keep an eye on Dick.

Act II begins in a spouting club. After leaving the meeting, Dick goes to Gargle's house in order to run away with Charlotte. Dick and Charlotte are caught as they're running away. They are arrested and cannot make bail. Wingate and Gargle arrive, and Gargle declares that if Dick finishes his apprenticeship, he will allow him to marry Charlotte. Dick agrees to this arrangement, deciding that "it will be like a Play, if I reform at the End."
