= Marina (play) =

- Original language: English
- Written by: George Lillo
- Genre: Tragedy

Premiere
- Date: 1 August 1738
- Place: Covent Garden Theatre

Marina is a 1738 tragedy by the British writer George Lillo. It is a reworking of Shakespeare's Pericles, Prince of Tyre, produced at a time when Covent Garden was experimenting with a summer season.

The original Covent Garden cast included Lewis Hallam as Lysimachus, Sarah Hamilton as Philoten and William Hallam as Mother Coupler.

== Bibliography ==
- Baines, Paul & Ferarro, Julian & Rogers, Pat. The Wiley-Blackwell Encyclopedia of Eighteenth-Century Writers and Writing, 1660-1789. Wiley-Blackwell, 2011.
- Kozar, Richard & Burling, William J. Summer Theatre in London, 1661-1820, and the Rise of the Haymarket Theatre. Fairleigh Dickinson Univ Press, 2000.
