= The Christian Hero =

Play by George Lillo

- Original language: English
- Written by: George Lillo
- Genre: Tragedy

Premiere
- Date: 13 January 1735
- Place: Theatre Royal, Drury Lane

The Christian Hero is a 1735 tragedy by the British writer George Lillo. It is based on the life of Skanderbeg who led a rebellion against the Ottoman Empire in the fifteenth century. Two years earlier William Havard had written Scanderbeg, another work based on his life.

The original Drury Lane cast included William Milward as Scanderbeg, James Quin as Amurath, William Mills as Mahomet, Edward Berry as Osmyn, Sarah Thurmond as Hellena, John Mills as Aranthes, Richard Winstone as Paulinus and Theophilus Cibber as Amasie.

== Bibliography ==
- Baines, Paul & Ferarro, Julian & Rogers, Pat. The Wiley-Blackwell Encyclopedia of Eighteenth-Century Writers and Writing, 1660-1789. Wiley-Blackwell, 2011.
- Burling, William J. A Checklist of New Plays and Entertainments on the London Stage, 1700-1737. Fairleigh Dickinson Univ Press, 1992.
