= The Chimera (play) =

Play by Thomas Odell

- Original language: English
- Written by: Thomas Odell
- Genre: Comedy

Premiere
- Date: 19 January 1721
- Place: Lincoln's Inn Fields Theatre

The Chimera is a 1721 comedy play by the British writer Thomas Odell.

The original Lincoln's Inn Fields cast included Anthony Boheme as Lord Gracebubble, William Bullock as Selfroth, Christopher Bullock as Ninnyhammer, George Pack as Teartext and Anna Maria Seymour as Lady Meanwell.

== Bibliography ==
- Burling, William J. A Checklist of New Plays and Entertainments on the London Stage, 1700-1737. Fairleigh Dickinson Univ Press, 1992.
- Nicoll, Allardyce. A History of Early Eighteenth Century Drama: 1700-1750. CUP Archive, 1927.
