= The Lying Valet =

Play by David Garrick

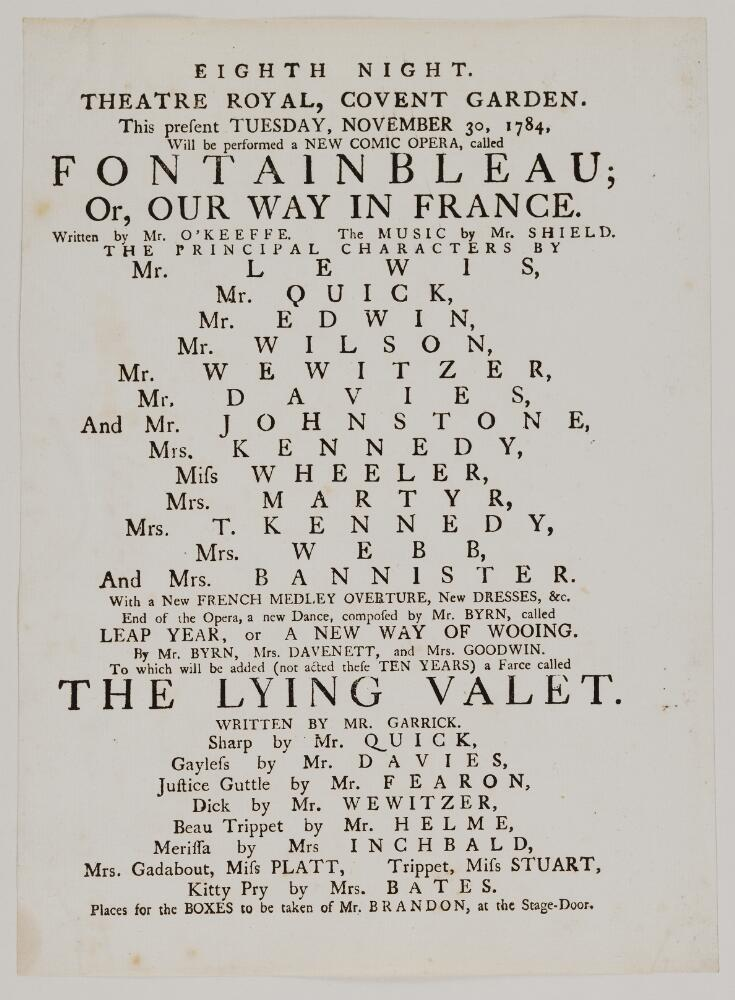
1784 playbill for The Lying Valet at Theatre Royal, Covent Garden

The Lying Valet is a British play by David Garrick. A farce, it was first performed at the Goodman's Fields Theatre on 30 November 1741. Garrick based his work on the second act of All Without Money by Peter Antony Motteux, which was in turn inspired by a French play. Garrick initially followed the plots of the earlier plays quite closely, but the work soon diverges significantly. It was the only one of Garrick's plays which was completely sentimental in nature.

== Bibliography ==
- Nettleton, George H. & Case, Arthur E. British Dramatists from Dryden to Sheridan. Southern Illinois University Press, 1975.
- Stein, Elizabeth. David Garrick, Dramatist. The Modern Language Association of America, 1937.
