= A Tutor for the Beaus =

1737 play

- Original language: English
- Written by: John Hewitt
- Genre: Comedy

Premiere
- Date: 21 February 1737
- Place: Lincoln's Inn Fields Theatre

A Tutor for the Beaus: Or Love in a Labyrinth is a 1737 comedy play by the British writer John Hewitt. It drew inspiration from an earlier one-act play Le Français à Londres by the French writer Louis de Boissy.

The original cast included James Rosco as Lord Manly, Benjamin Johnson as Sir Charles Freelove, Thomas Wright as Belville, William Giffard as Heatly, Henry Woodward as Young Manly and Anna Marcella Giffard as Pinup.

== Bibliography ==
- Burling, William J. A Checklist of New Plays and Entertainments on the London Stage, 1700-1737. Fairleigh Dickinson Univ Press, 1992.
- Nicoll, Allardyce. A History of Early Eighteenth Century Drama: 1700-1750. CUP Archive, 1927.
