= Thomas Odell (writer) =

English playwright

Thomas Odell (1691 – 24 May 1749) was an English playwright, and for a short time producer of plays at a theatre he erected, Goodman's Fields Theatre.

== Life ==
Odell was born in 1691, the son of a Buckinghamshire squire. He came to London about 1714 with introductions to some of the Whig leaders, and a desire to try his hand at lampooning. He obtained a pension of £200 through the influence of Lord Wharton and the Earl of Sunderland, and put his pen at Robert Walpole's disposal. He is said by the antiquary William Oldys to have written a number of satires upon Alexander Pope, and to have been deterred from printing them only by Walpole's fear lest such a step might estrange Lord Chesterfield and others of Pope's admirers among his adherents.

In 1721 his first comedy, The Chimera, a satirical piece aimed at the speculators in Change Alley, was produced at the theatre in Lincoln's Inn Fields, but met with small success on the boards, though when printed it ran to a second edition before the close of the year.

In October 1729 Odell erected a theatre at Goodman's Fields, and engaged a company, with Henry Giffard as its leading actor. He produced there in the course of his first season The Recruiting Officer, The Orphan, and two successful original comedies, Henry Fielding's The Temple Beau and John Mottley's The Widow Bewitched. In 1730, however, the Lord Mayor and aldermen petitioned the king to suppress the superfluous playhouse in Goodman's Fields. Odell tried to avert hostile criticism by shutting up the house for a time, but this so impaired its prospects that he had to dispose of it early in 1731 to his friend Giffard.

William Rufus Chetwood attributes Odell's failure to his ignorance of the way to manage a company. He had lost his pension upon the death of the fourth Earl of Sunderland, his plays met with no success, and he seems to have been for some years reduced to great straits for a living. In February 1738, however, when William Chetwynd was sworn in as first licenser of the stage (on the introduction of the Licensing Act 1737), with a salary of £400, Odell retained enough influence to obtain the office of deputy licenser, with a salary of £200; he held the office until his death.

He died at his house in Chapel Street, Westminster, on 24 May 1749. He left a widow, who was well known and esteemed by William Oldys; he wrote of Odell: "He was a great observator of everything curious in the conversation of his acquaintance; and his own conversation was a living chronicle of the remarkable intrigues, adventures, sayings, stories, writings, etc. of many of the Quality, Poets and other Authors, Players, Booksellers who flourished especially in the present century. … He was a popular man at elections, but latterly was forced to live reserved and retired by reason of his debts."

== Works ==
In addition to The Chimera, Odell wrote:

1. The Smugglers, a Farce, 1729, performed with some success at the little theatre in the Haymarket, and reissued in the same year as The Smugglers: a Comedy, dedicated to George Doddington. Appended to the second edition is "The Art of Dancing", in three cantos and in heroic verse, in which the fabled origin of the order of the Garter is versified.
2. The Patron; or the Statesman's Opera of two Acts … to which is added the Musick to each Song. Dedicated to Charles Spencer, 5th Earl of Sunderland. This was produced at the Haymarket in 1730.
3. The Prodigal; or Recruits for the Queen of Hungary, 1744; adapted from the Woman Captain of Shadwell, and dedicated to Lionel Cranfield Sackville, Earl of Middlesex. It owed a small temporary success to the popularity of Maria Theresa in London at the time.

He is said by Oldys to have been engaged at the time of his death upon "an History of the characters he had observed and conferences with many eminent persons he had known in his time," and the antiquary also saw in manuscript A History of the Play House in Goodman's Fields by Odell. Neither of these is extant.
