= 1800 in literature =

This article contains information about the literary events and publications of 1800.

== Events ==
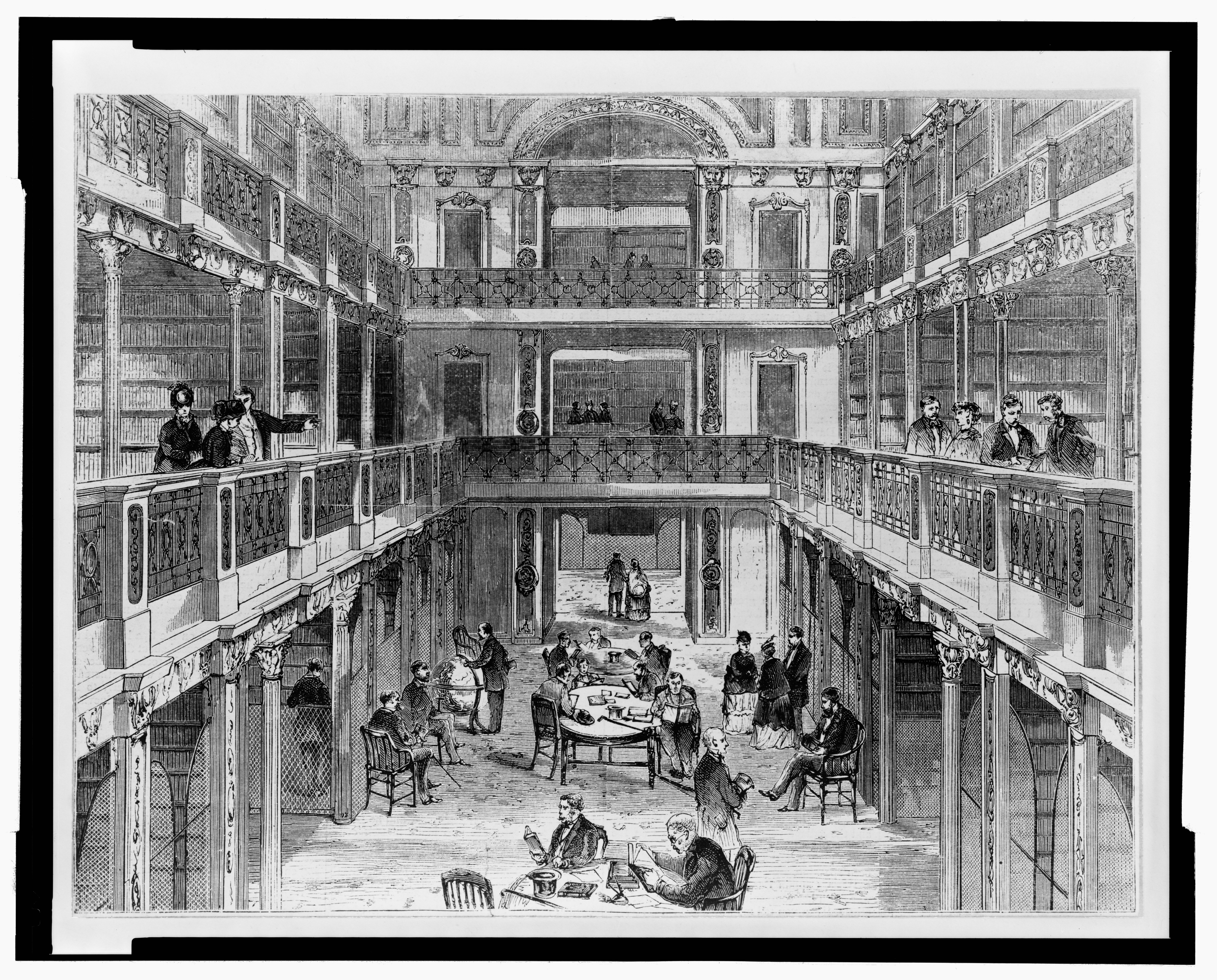
The Library of Congress, then located in the Capitol Building in 1853

- January – Maria Edgeworth's first extended work of fiction, Castle Rackrent ("an Hibernian Tale: Taken from Facts, and from the Manners of the Irish Squires, Before the Year 1782"), is published anonymously in London, variously regarded as the first historical novel, the first regional novel in the English language, the first Anglo-Irish novel, the first Big House novel, the first saga novel and the first with an unreliable narrator.
- January 10 – The Serampore Mission and Press is established in Serampore (now part of West Bengal) India by the Baptist missionaries Joshua Marshman and William Ward. The press will grow into the largest in Asia, printing books in nearly every Indian language.
- March – English "ploughboy poet" Robert Bloomfield's The Farmer's Boy is published with engravings by Thomas Bewick, selling over 25,000 copies in the next two years, with 15 editions by 1827 and a number of translations.
- April 24 – The United States establishes the Library of Congress. On April 24, 1800, the Library was established when John Adams, the second president of the United States,signed an act of Congress which appropriated $5,000 "for the purchase of such books as may be necessary for the use of Congress...and for fitting up a suitable apartment for containing them." Books were ordered from London, forming a collection of 740 books and three maps housed in the new United States Capitol.
- June 14 – Friedrich Schiller's historical drama Mary Stuart has its première in Weimar.
- September – William Blake begins three years' residence in a cottage at Felpham in Sussex to illustrate the works of William Hayley; here he begins work on his poem Milton.
- October 3 – William and Dorothy Wordsworth, walking near Grasmere in the English Lake District, encounter a leech gatherer who inspires his poem "Resolution and Independence", first written 18 months later.

== New books ==
=== Fiction ===
- Helen Craik – The Hermit's Cell
- Maria Edgeworth – Castle Rackrent
- Anne Ford – The School for Fashion
- Stéphanie Félicité, Comtesse de Genlis – The Rival Mothers
- William Henry Ireland
  - Gondez the Monk
  - Rimualdo
- Francis Lathom – Mystery
- William Linley – Forbidden Apartments
- Mary Meeke – Anecdotes of the Altamont Family
- Eliza Parsons – The Miser and his Family
- Regina Maria Roche
  - The Nocturnal Visit
  - The Vicar of Lansdowne
- Catherine Selden – Serena
- Horatio Smith – A Family Story

=== Children ===
- François Guillaume Ducray-Duminil
  - Les Petits orphelins du hameau (The young orphans from the hamlet)
  - Paul, ou la Ferme abandonnée (Paul or the abandoned farmstead)
- Edward Augustus Kendall
  - The Swallow: a fiction interspersed with poetry
  - The Stories of Senex; or little histories of little people

=== Drama ===
- Joanna Baillie – De Monfort
- Richard Cumberland – Joanna of Montfaucon
- Thomas Dibdin – The School for Prejudice
- William Godwin – Antonio
- Prince Hoare – Indiscretion
- Henry James Pye – Adelaide
- Frederick Reynolds – Life
- Friedrich Schiller – Maria Stuart

=== Non-fiction ===
- Jacob Boehme – L'Aurore naissante (translated into French by Louis Claude de Saint-Martin)
- Alexander Geddes – Critical Remarks on the Hebrew Scriptures
- Elizabeth Hamilton – Memoirs of Modern Philosophers
- Arnold Hermann Ludwig Heeren – Geschichte des europäischen Staatensystems (History of the European System of States)
- Immanuel Kant – Logik
- Friedrich Wilhelm Joseph Schelling – System of Transcendental Idealism (System des transcendentalen Idealismus)
- Parson Weems – A History of the Life and Death, Virtues and Exploits of General George Washington

== Births ==
- January 6 – Anna Maria Hall, Irish novelist (died 1881)
- January 16 – Robert Bell, Irish-born man of letters (died 1867)
- March 2 – Yevgeny Baratynsky, Russian poet (died 1844)
- March 6 – Gustava Kielland, author and missionary (died 1889)
- March 12 – Louis Prosper Gachard, Belgian editor (died 1885)
- March 25 – Alexis Paulin Paris, French editor of medieval manuscripts (died 1881)
- April 17 – Catherine Sinclair, Scottish novelist and children's writer (died 1864)
- May 5 – Louis Christophe François Hachette, French publisher Louis Christophe François Hachette, French publisher (d. 1864)
- May 8 – Armand Carrel, French writer (died 1836)
- May 9 – Samuel Carter Hall, English journalist (died 1889)
- October 18 – Sir Henry Taylor, English dramatist and poet (died 1886)
- October 25
  - Maria Jane Jewsbury, English writer, poet and reviewer (died 1833)
  - Thomas Babington Macaulay, 1st Baron Macaulay, English-born poet and historian (died 1859)
- November 27 – Fanny Kemble, English actress and writer (died 1893)
- unknown dates
  - Costache Aristia, Wallachian translator, poet, dramatist and actor (died 1880)
  - Thomas Henry Lister, English novelist and Registrar General (died 1842)
  - Wanda Malecka, Polish translator, poet and novelist (died 1860)

== Deaths ==
- January 22 – George Steevens, English Shakespearean commentator (born 1736)
- February 22 – Joseph Warton, English academic and literary critic (born 1722)
- May - Evan Hughes (Hughes Fawr), Welsh clergyman and author (year of birth unknown)
- March 14 – Daines Barrington, English lawyer, antiquary and naturalist (born c. 1727)
- March 16 – David Doig, Scottish educator and writer (born 1719)
- March 29 – Marc René, marquis de Montalembert, French military engineer and writer (born 1714)
- April 25 – William Cowper, English poet (born 1731)
- August 25 – Elizabeth Montagu, English literary critic (born 1718)
- September 29 – Michael Denis, Austrian poet (born 1729)
- December 26 – Mary Robinson ("Perdita"), English poet, actress and royal mistress (born 1757)
