= King Charles I (play) =

1737 play

- Written by: William Havard
- Original language: English
- Genre: Tragedy

Premiere
- Date premiered: 1 March 1737
- Place premiered: Lincoln's Inn Fields Theatre

King Charles I is a 1737 tragedy by the British writer William Havard. Written as an imitation of the style of Shakespeare's history plays, it focuses on the imprisonment of Charles I following his defeat in the Civil War and execution by the English Republic. It was a major success and anticipated later works by portraying Charles as a devoted family man who is undone by the scheming of Oliver Cromwell and his allies.

It premiered at the Lincoln's Inn Fields Theatre with a cast that included Henry Giffard as King Charles, William Giffard as Ireton, William Hamilton as the Duke of Gloucester, William Havard as Bishop Juxton, Thomas Wright as Oliver Cromwell, Benjamin Johnson as Fairfax and Anna Marcella Giffard as Queen Henrietta Maria.

== Bibliography ==
- Baines, Paul & Ferarro, Julian & Rogers, Pat. The Wiley-Blackwell Encyclopedia of Eighteenth-Century Writers and Writing, 1660-1789. Wiley-Blackwell, 2011.
- Burling, William J. A Checklist of New Plays and Entertainments on the London Stage, 1700-1737. Fairleigh Dickinson Univ Press, 1992.
- Lacey, Andrew. The Cult of King Charles the Martyr. Boydell & Brewer, 2003.
- Richards, Jeffrey. Sir Henry Irving: A Victorian Actor and His World. A&C Black, 2005.
