= The Parricide =

1736 play

- Original language: English
- Written by: James Sterling
- Genre: Tragedy

Premiere
- Date: 29 January 1736
- Place: Goodman's Fields Theatre

The Parricide (also spelt The Parracide) is a 1736 tragedy written by the Irish writer James Sterling.

The original Goodman's Fields Theatre cast included Benjamin Johnson as Altamar, William Havard as Montesini, Henry Giffard as Mirzabdi, Henry Woodward as Issouf, Anna Marcella Giffard as Beleyda and Sarah Hamilton as Amanthe.

== Bibliography ==
- Avery, Emmett Langdon . The London Stage, Volume III: A Calendar Of Plays, Entertainments And Afterpieces, Together With Casts, Box Receipts And Contemporary Comment. Southern Illinois University Press, 1961.
- Burling, William J. A Checklist of New Plays and Entertainments on the London Stage, 1700-1737. Fairleigh Dickinson Univ Press, 1992.
