= The Maid of Bath =

1771 play

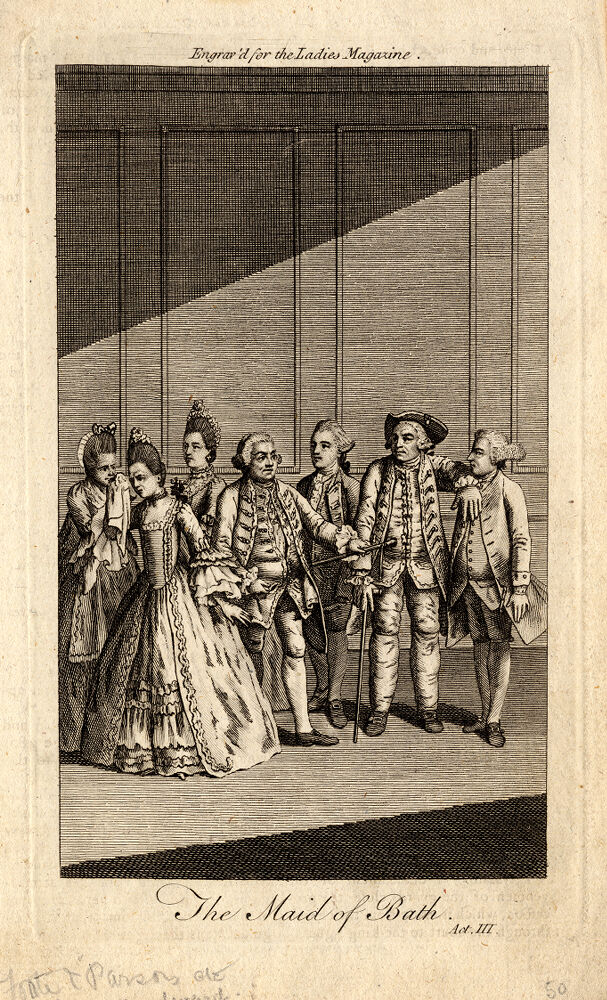
- Original language: English
- Written by: Samuel Foote
- Genre: Comedy
- Setting: Bath, present day

Premiere
- Date: 26 June 1771
- Place: Theatre Royal, Haymarket, London

The Maid of Bath is a 1771 comedy play by the British actor-manager Samuel Foote. It premiered at the Theatre Royal, Haymarket in London on 26 June 1771. It was inspired by the life of the singer Elizabeth Ann Linley of the Bath-based Linley family. The prologue was written by David Garrick.

== Original cast ==
- Samuel Foote as Flint
- Henry Woodward as Sir Christopher Cripple
- James Aickin as Major Rackett
- Thomas Weston as Billy Button
- James Fearon as Peter Poultice
- Mr. Davis as Fillup
- Richard Castle as Mynheer Sour Crout
- Mr Loyd as Monsieur De Jarsey
- Miss Platt as Mrs Linnett
- Miss Jewell as Kitty Linnett
- Mary Fearon as Lady Catherine Coldstream
- Mrs. Weston as Maid

== Bibliography ==
- Greene, John C. Theatre in Dublin, 1745-1820: A Calendar of Performances, Volume 6. Lexington Books, 2011.
- Kelly, Ian. Mr Foote's Other Leg: Comedy, Tragedy and Murder in Georgian London. Pan Macmillan, 2012.
- Nicoll, Allardyce. A History of English Drama 1660–1900: Volume III. Cambridge University Press, 2009.
- Hogan, C.B (ed.) The London Stage, 1660–1800: Volume V. Southern Illinois University Press, 1968.
