= The Compromise (play) =

1722 play

- Original language: English
- Written by: John Sturmy
- Genre: Comedy

Premiere
- Date: 15 December 1722
- Place: Lincoln's Inn Fields Theatre

The Compromise is a 1722 comedy play by the British writer John Sturmy.

The original cast included John Hippisley as Sir Clement Harpye, Thomas Walker as Charles Despotick, Anthony Boheme as Weighty, Richard Diggs as Galloper, John Leigh as Random, Jane Egleton as Old Woman, William Bullock as Saracen, Jane Rogers as Harriet, Henrietta Morgan as Mrs Saracen, and Anna Maria Seymour as Isabella.

== Bibliography ==
- Burling, William J. A Checklist of New Plays and Entertainments on the London Stage, 1700-1737. Fairleigh Dickinson Univ Press, 1992.
- Nicoll, Allardyce. A History of Early Eighteenth Century Drama: 1700-1750. CUP Archive, 1927.
