= Luis Galiana y Cervera =

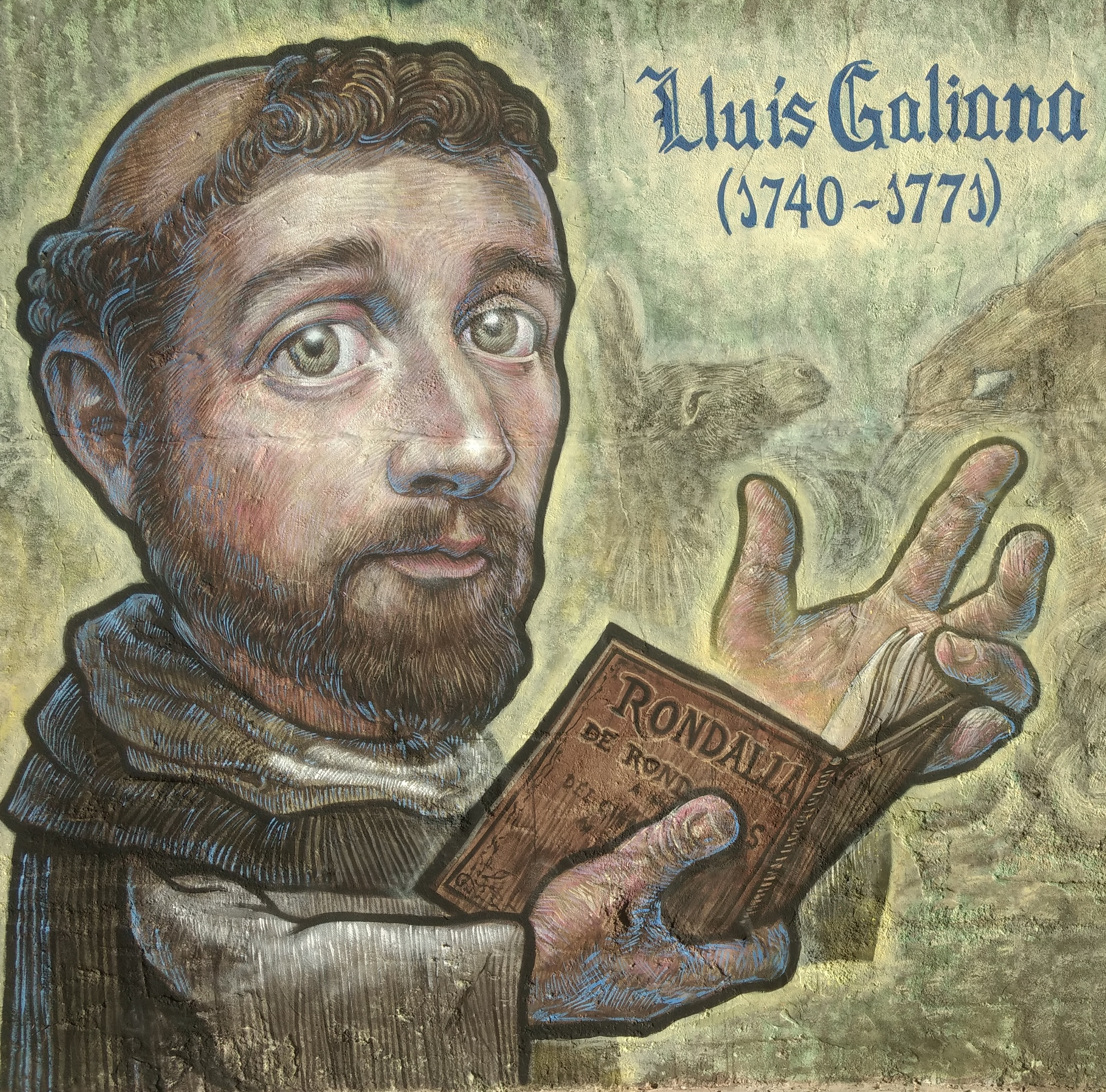
- Born: 8 June 1740
- Died: 1771 (aged 30–31)
- Occupations: Theologian, philologist, writer

Luis Galiana y Cervera (8 June 1740 – 1771) was a Spanish Dominican theologian, philologist and writer.

== Early life ==
Luis Galiana y Cervera was born on 8 June 1740 in Ontinyent, Spain, the son of a prominent physician. At the age of 16 he joined the Dominican Order and became part of the Convent of Saint John and of Saint Vincent of Ontinyent. His superiors sent him to study philosophy and theology at a school in Orihuela, where he was noted both for his intellect and for his moral virtues.

== Works ==
While still in Ontinyent, Galiana y Cervera wrote a prologue to The Perfect Wife by Luis de León. Among his unpublished works is a manuscript entitled Tratatus de inscripcionibus antiquis, duobus tomis comprehensus. Cum variis scholiis, notis te animadvertionibus ad intelligenda multa venerandae Antiquitatis monumenta aptissimis (1758), archived at the University of Valencia, in which he brings together ancient inscriptions from all over Spain, together with passage from writers such as Escolano, Beuter, Morales, and Aldetre, in order to make an impassioned defense of classical antiquity.

Though his literary output is generally admired, he has been criticized for his work Fábula de fábulas, and others have accused him of falling into vulgarity and poor taste in his Onologio o historia de los burros.

Galiana y Cervera's most famous work is Rondalla de rondalles, published in 1796 in Valencia and republished several times. Luis Galiana also maintained an abundant correspondence with Gregorio Mayans, with whom he exchanged his thoughts and his philosophical and linguistic doubts.

Galiana y Cervera was sickly for most of his life, and in 1771, at the age of 31, he died of tuberculosis.
