= Love and Duty (play) =

1722 play

- Written by: John Sturmy
- Original language: English
- Genre: Tragedy

Premiere
- Date premiered: 22 January 1722
- Place premiered: Lincoln's Inn Fields Theatre

Love and Duty is a 1722 tragedy by the British writer John Sturmy.

The original Lincoln's Inn Fields cast included Anthony Boheme as Danaus James Quin as Lynceus, Richard Diggs as Arcas, John Egleton as Idas and Anna Maria Seymour as Hypermnestra and Jane Egleton as Iris. It lasted for six performances on its initial run.

== Bibliography ==
- Burling, William J. A Checklist of New Plays and Entertainments on the London Stage, 1700-1737. Fairleigh Dickinson Univ Press, 1992.
- Nicoll, Allardyce. A History of Early Eighteenth Century Drama: 1700-1750. CUP Archive, 1927.
