= James Sterling (poet) =

Church of England clergyman and poet

James Sterling (1701–1763) was an Irish cleric and poet.

== Life ==
The son of James Sterling, he entered Trinity College, Dublin as a scholar in 1718, graduating B.A. in 1720 and M.A. in 1733. In that year he went to London with his friend Matthew Concanen.

In November 1737 Sterling took a living in Anne Arundel County, Maryland. He was from 1739 the minister of the Episcopal St. Paul's Church near Chestertown. His ministry lasted to 1763, and saw the brick church doubled in size.

Sterling travelled to London in 1752. He had associated in a scheme, with Benjamin Franklin who brought in backers from Philadelphia, to develop the North-West Passage. Franklin had become a sponsor of Captain Charles Swaine, who eventually made a Labrador Sea expedition in the Argo, in 1753. Sterling, however, struck out on his own, with a group of London merchants, and went to the Board of Trade for them, seeking exclusive rights to trade on the Labrador coast. Plans came to nothing, when the Board favoured the Hudson's Bay Company instead.

== Works ==
Sterling published:

- The Rival Generals, as it was acted at the Theatre Royal, Dublin (verse drama in five acts)
- The Loves of Hero and Leander (1728) from the Greek of Musæus, reissued with a smaller pieces as Poetical Works of the Rev. James Sterling (Dublin, 1734)
- The Parricide: a tragedy (London, 1736, verse drama in five acts), given five times at Goodman's Fields in December 1735. It possibly had already been performed in Dublin, c.1726. Henry Giffard, manager of Goodman's Fields, was brother-in-law of Sterling's first wife.
- An Epistle to the Hon. Arthur Dobbs (Dublin and London, 1752), long poem. It made much of the commercial prospects of the North-West Passage, as promoted by Arthur Dobbs.
- Zeal against the enemies of our country, sermon preached 13 December 1754, printed at the Annapolis press in 1755. It was preached at the request of Horatio Sharpe, Maryland's governor, after an outbreak of frontier fighting.

In 1724 Sterling made three contributions to Concanen's Poems, signed "J. S."

== Family ==
Sterling married, firstly, Nancy Lyddell, who had acted in The Rival Generals in Dublin. In 1723 they went on to London, and Nancy made her stage debut there. She had died by 1733. In Maryland, he married in 1743 Rebecca Holt, widow of the Rev. Arthur Holt, and they had a daughter Rebecca, who married William Carmichael. He married as his third wife Mary Smith, in 1749.
