= Henry Giffard =

British actor and theatre manager

- Born: 1694; London, England
- Died: 20 October 1772 (aged 77–78); Ealing, Middlesex, Great Britain
- Occupation: Actor
- Years active: c.1719–1748

Henry Giffard (1694 – 20 October 1772) was a British stage actor and theatre manager.

== Early life ==
Although there is some uncertainty about his early years, he is described as being the son of William Giffard. Born in London – in Lincoln's Inn Fields by some accounts – he worked for several years as a clerk for the South Sea Company before turning to acting.

== Ireland ==
Throughout the 1720s, he was a member of the Smock Alley Theatre company in Dublin, Ireland's leading theatre of the era. While there he married the Irish actress Mary Lydall, with whom he had two children. After her death he remarried to a relation of hers, Anna Marcella Lydall, who thereafter acted under the name Mrs Giffard.

In 1726, he briefly appeared in at Drury Lane in London, appearing in Henry IV and The Recruiting Officer, but then did not return to the London stage for three years.

== Goodman's Fields Theatre ==
In 1729 he appeared at Thomas Odell's Goodman's Fields Theatre appearing in a wide variety of different roles in classic plays often appearing alongside his wife. After some brief work at the King's Theatre in Haymarket he took over management of Goodman's Fields Theatre from the 1731–32 season. He supervised construction of a new playhouse on Ayliff Street with a capacity of around seven hundred.

In 1735 he returned to tour Ireland, appearing at the new Aungier Street Theatre in Dublin. Back at Goodman's Fields in 1736 he celebrated the marriage of George II's daughter Anne and William of Orange with a revival of Richard Steele's popular The Conscious Lovers. However during the 1736–37 season he moved his company to the Lincoln's Inn Fields Theatre. Although initially denying this meant that the Goodman's Field venue had been abandoned by the company, he soon after unsuccessfully tried to sell it. His further progress was dramatically ended by Prime Minister Robert Walpole's strict new Licensing Act 1737 which meant that he could no longer legally stage plays in London because he didn't control one of the patent theatre licences. He then went back to Ireland, appearing once again at the Smock Alley Theatre and then moved to Edinburgh. In London he joined the Drury Lane company, playing Sir Harry Wildair in The Constant Couple amongst other roles. Much of his time was spent lobbying officials to allow him to reopen the Goodman's Fields Theatre, and in 1740 he was finally given permission to do so.

It was around this time that he discovered the actor David Garrick and began casting him in productions at Goodman's Fields, beginning with the title role in Richard III in which Giffard played Henry VI and his wife and son William Giffard both also appeared. Despite the profitable performances of the emerging star Garrick, the actor-manager Giffard struggled financially, particularly when Garrick left the company. Giffard again tried to base himself at Lincoln's Inn Fields, but his attempt to establish a third top-flight London theatre alongside Drury Lane and Covent Garden had essentially failed.

== Later years ==
From 1742 to 1747, he played in both the Drury Lane and Smock Alley companies as an actor once more. Around this time he was admitted to the Sublime Society of Beef Steaks. His final London season was at Covent Garden in 1748, after which he retired to Brentford west of the capital.

== Selected roles ==
- Honorio in The Rival Generals (1722)
- Stanza in The Widow Bewitched (1730)
- Essex in The Fall of the Earl of Essex (1731)
- Scandenberg in Scanderbeg (1733)
- Mirzabdi in The Parricide (1736)
- Addle in The Independent Patriot (1737)
- Riot in The Wife's Relief (1737)
- King Charles in King Charles I (1737)
- Henry IV in Richard III (1741)
- Dumont in Jane Shore (1743)
- Briar in Love the Cause and Cure of Grief (1743)
- Sir Harry Wildair in The Constant Couple (1743)
- Alcanor in Mahomet the Imposter (1744)

== Bibliography ==
- Highfill, Philip H, Burnim, Kalman A. & Langhans, Edward A. A Biographical Dictionary of Actors, Actresses, Musicians, Dancers, Managers, and Other Stage Personnel in London, 1660-1800: Garrick to Gyngell. SIU Press, 1978.
- Johanson, Kristine. Shakespeare Adaptations from the Early Eighteenth Century: Five Plays. Rowman & Littlefield, 2013.
