= The Rival Generals =

1722 play

- Original language: English
- Written by: James Sterling
- Genre: Tragedy

Premiere
- Date: March 1722
- Place: Smock Alley Theatre

The Rival Generals is a 1722 tragedy by the Irish writer James Sterling.

It premiered at the Smock Alley Theatre in Dublin. The original cast included Francis Elrington as Spinloi, Richard Elrington as Lorenzo, Henry Giffard as Honorio and Nancy Lyddal as Sygismunda.

Sterling dedicated his play to William Conolly, a leading Irish Whig and Speaker of the Irish House of Commons.

== Bibliography ==
- Greene, John C. & Clark, Gladys L. H. The Dublin Stage, 1720-1745: A Calendar of Plays, Entertainments, and Afterpiece. Lehigh University Press, 1993.
- Walsh, Patrick. The Making of the Irish Protestant Ascendancy: The Life of William Conolly, 1662-1729. Boydell & Brewer, 2010.
