= Legitimate theatre =

Type of performance

Legitimate theatre (Note: Often spelled theater in the U.S.) is live performance that relies almost entirely on diegetic elements, with actors performing through speech and natural movement. Traditionally, performances of such theatre were termed legitimate drama, while the abbreviation the legitimate refers to legitimate theatre or drama and legit is a noun referring both to such dramas and actors in these dramas. Legitimate theatre and dramas are contrasted with other types of stage performance such as musical theatre, farce, revue, melodrama, burlesque and vaudeville, as well as recorded performances on film and television.

== History ==
The terms legitimate theatre and legitimate drama date back to the English Licensing Act 1737, which restricted "serious" theatre performances to the two patent theatres licensed to perform "spoken drama" after the English Restoration in 1662. Other theatres were permitted to show comedy, pantomime, opera, dance, music hall or melodrama, but were considered "illegitimate theatre". Everett Wilson speculates that the law may have arisen due to "the fear of theatrical producers that without legal protection both the money and the audience would flow away from the "legitimate theatres" to the lowest common denominator of entertainment in those days, the music halls."

The licensing restricted performances of classical authors and plays—Shakespeare, most prominently—to the privileged houses. The logic behind the step was that the legitimate houses could be censored more easily, whilst the illegitimate houses would sell plays of a less serious, less dangerous, primarily entertaining and commercialised format. Illegitimate theatres opened in all the major English cities and towns where they offered pantomime and musical works, such as opera, Victorian burlesque, burletta, extravaganza, music hall, concerts, dance and melodrama, which had musical underscoring played during the dialogue.

This changed with the Theatres Act 1843 that restricted the powers of the Lord Chamberlain and gave additional powers to local authorities to license theatres, breaking the monopoly of the patent theatres and encouraging the development of popular theatrical entertainments, such as saloon theatres attached to public houses and music halls. In the 1890s club theatres were founded exploiting a legal loophole. Open only to their members, these houses evaded the censorship law by turning their performances from a public enterprise into a private one.

In the 19th century, the term legitimate drama came to be "widely used by actors of the old school as a defence against the encroachments" of newer types of performance, and this sense of the term spread beyond England to the United States, where like in England, the term conferred a sense of "'literary' value" to traditional stage plays.

In the 20th century, the term legitimate theatre "became vernacular within [the] turn-of-the-[20th]-century amusement market" and "confirmed the fact that conventional stage plays no longer monopolized the definition of legitimate theatrical entertainment," while serving "as a strategy for profiting under these new conditions" across the English-speaking world. With the advent of recorded media, legitimate was extended to contrast with motion pictures and television as well.

The separation between "legitimate" and "illegitimate" finally formally ended in the aftermath of the scandal Edward Bond's Saved created in 1965–66. The play was first performed in London in late 1965 at the Royal Court Theatre. The house was licensed to perform serious plays. Saved, however, had not been licensed to be performed as Bond had written it. In order for it to be performed as planned, the Royal Court Theatre had lent its stage to the English Stage Theatre Company and thus turned the performance into a private enterprise under the prevailing laws. The evasion was challenged by the magistrate's court in February 1966 and declared a violation of the Theatres Act 1843 on 1 April 1966. The repeal of the Act in 1968 eventually ended the split between legitimate and illegitimate theatres in England.

== See also ==
- Diegesis
- Musical film
- Musical theatre
