= George Lillo =

English playwright (1691-1739)

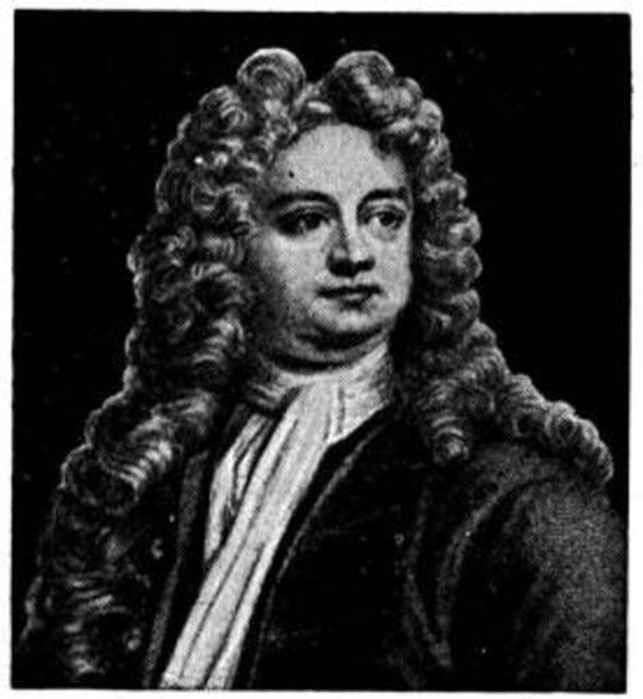
- Born: 3 February 1691; Moorfields, London
- Died: 4 September 1739 (aged 48); Rotherhithe, London
- Writing career
- Notable work: The London Merchant

George Lillo (3 February 1691 – 4 September 1739) was an English playwright. He was also a jeweller in London. He produced his first stage work, Silvia, or The Country Burial, in 1730, and a year later his most famous play, The London Merchant. He wrote at least six more plays before his death in 1739, including The Christian Hero (1735), Fatal Curiosity (1737) and Marina (1738).

== Life ==
George Lillo was born in Moorfields, or Moorgate, in the City of London. He became a partner in his father's goldsmith's and jewellery business.

=== Early stage works ===
Lillo wrote at least eight plays between 1730 and his death in 1739. His first work in the theatre was the ballad opera Sylvia, or The Country Burial in 1730. He wrote it in order to reproduce the success of John Gay's The Beggar's Opera, but Lillo's play received mixed reviews and only showed for three nights at Lincoln's Inn Fields, in November 1730, and for a one-night revival at Covent Garden in March 1738, reduced to two acts.

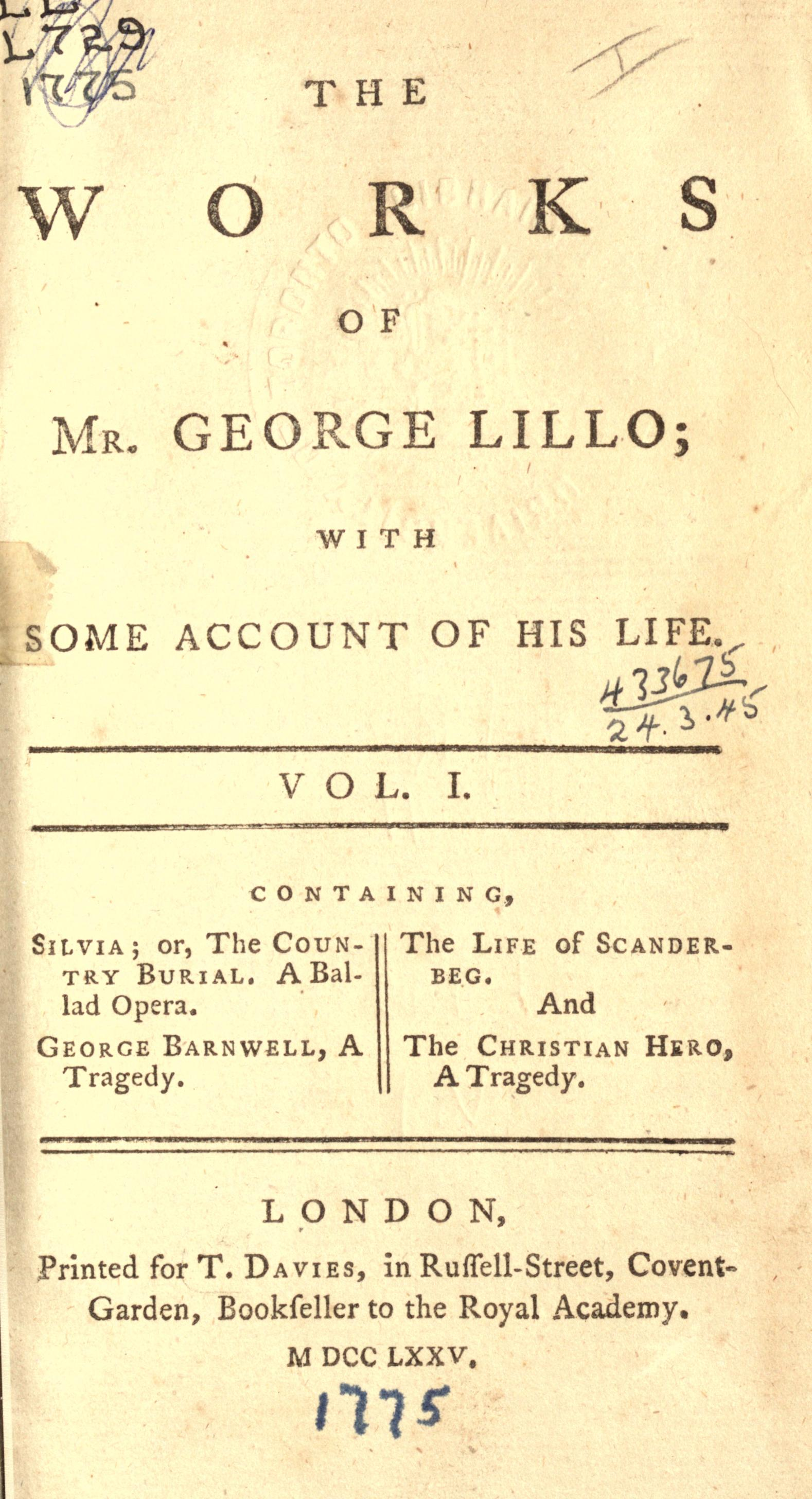
Contents page of Lillo's The Works of Mr. George Lillo with Some Account of His Life, 1775

The following year, Lillo wrote his most famous play, The London Merchant, or The History of George Barnwell (1731), which is considered one of the most popular and frequently produced plays of the 18th century. In October 1731 it was presented by royal command in the presence of George II and Queen Caroline. It was in the genre that came to be called melodrama. In The London Merchant, the subject is an apprentice who is seduced by Sarah Millwood, a "lady of pleasure," and then struggles to atone for his indiscretion throughout the remainder of the play, with little success. Lillo shows how "evil breeds evil," and Barnwell's initial dalliance eventually leads him to rob his master and murder his uncle in an attempt to secure the money needed to save Millwood's ostensibly endangered reputation. Her seduction, however, is simply a ruse to exploit his naïveté, so her reputation is never actually in danger. Lillo redefined the subject of dramatic tragedy and demonstrated that middle and lower class citizens were worthy of tragic downfalls. The 17th century ballad about a murder in Shropshire was the historical foundation for the play. Lillo dedicates the play to Sir John Eyles, a prominent member of the merchant class in London, in a letter before the text and plot begins. Lillo's domestic tragedy reflects a turning of the theatre away from the court and toward the town. Dickens introduced "the affecting tragedy of George Barnwell" into his novel Great Expectations. It was dismissed as a "nauseous sermon" by Charles Lamb, though much admired by Lillo's contemporaries Samuel Richardson and Colley Cibber, who acted in the original production of the play.

Lillo revived the genre of play referred to as domestic tragedy (or bourgeois tragedy). Even though the Jacobean stage had flirted with merchant and artisan plays in the past (with, for example, Thomas Dekker and Thomas Heywood), The London Merchant was a significant change in theatre, and in tragedy in particular. Instead of dealing with heroes from classical literature or the Bible, presented with spectacle and grand stage effects, his subjects concerned everyday people, such as his audience, the theater-going middle classes, and his tragedies were conducted on the intimate scale of households, rather than kingdoms.

Lillo was concerned that plays be morally correct and in keeping with Christian values. In 1734 he produced a patriotic masque, Britannia and Batavia, for the royal wedding of Anne, the Princess Royal, to William IV of Orange-Nassau. His next play was The Christian Hero (1735), a retelling of the story of Skanderbeg.

=== Later years ===
Later in the decade, Lillo wrote Fatal Curiosity (1737) and Marina (1738). He based Marina on the play Pericles by William Shakespeare. His last play, Elmerick, or Justice Triumphant, was performed posthumously in 1740. Lillo adapted the anonymous Elizabethan play Arden of Feversham, which was posthumously performed, first in 1759. It was based on the life of Alice Arden.

In his own day, his later plays, other than Merchant, were only moderate successes, and after his death old style tragedies and comedies continued to dominate the stage. All of Lillo's plays were produced in London, and only three of them produced any profit.

Lillo died at age 48, in 1739, in Rotherhithe, London.
