= Patent theatre =

British theatres licensed to show dramas in the 17th to 19th centuries

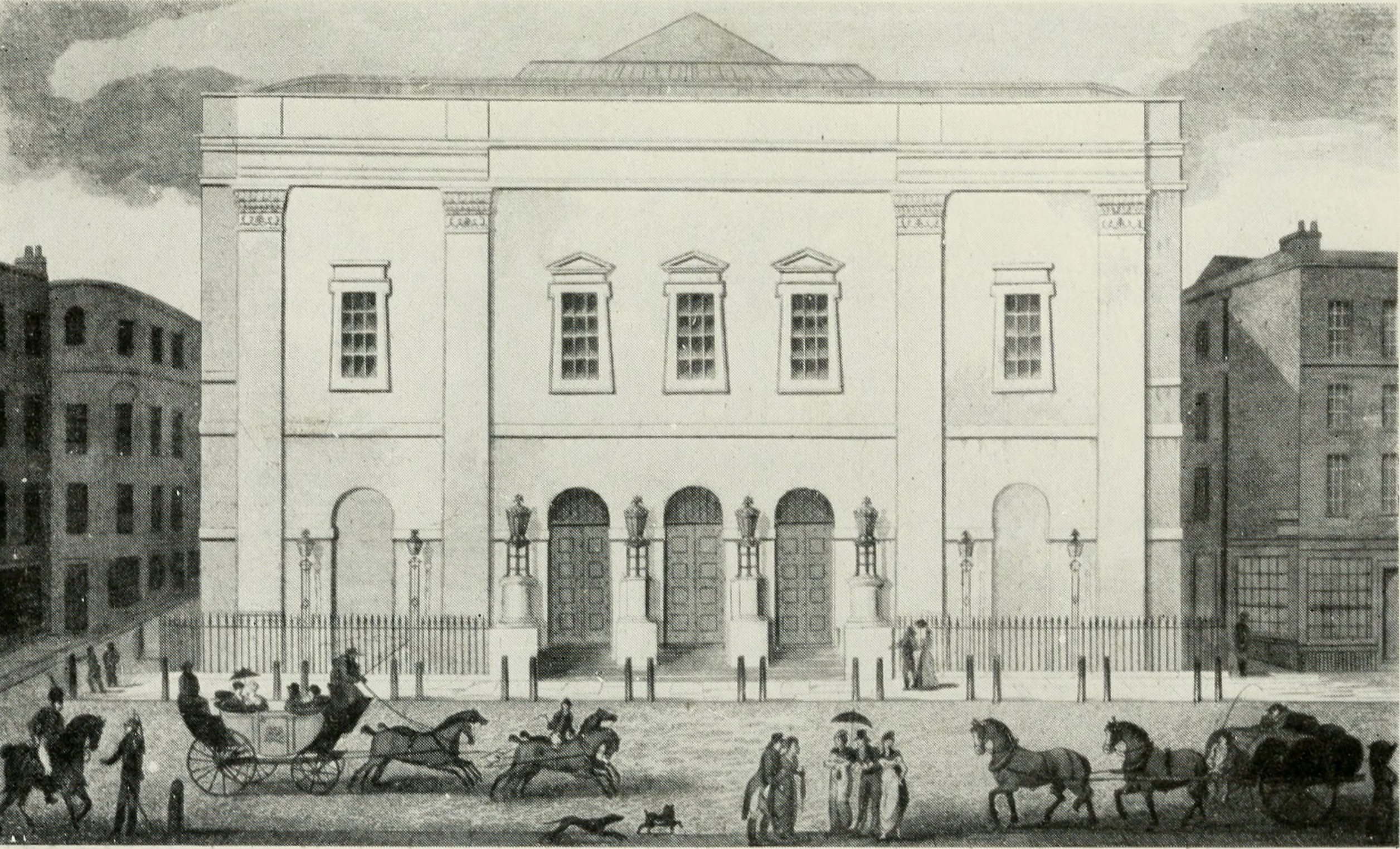
Theatre Royal, Drury Lane in 1812. Drury Lane was established as one of the patent theatres in 1663 during the reign of Charles II.

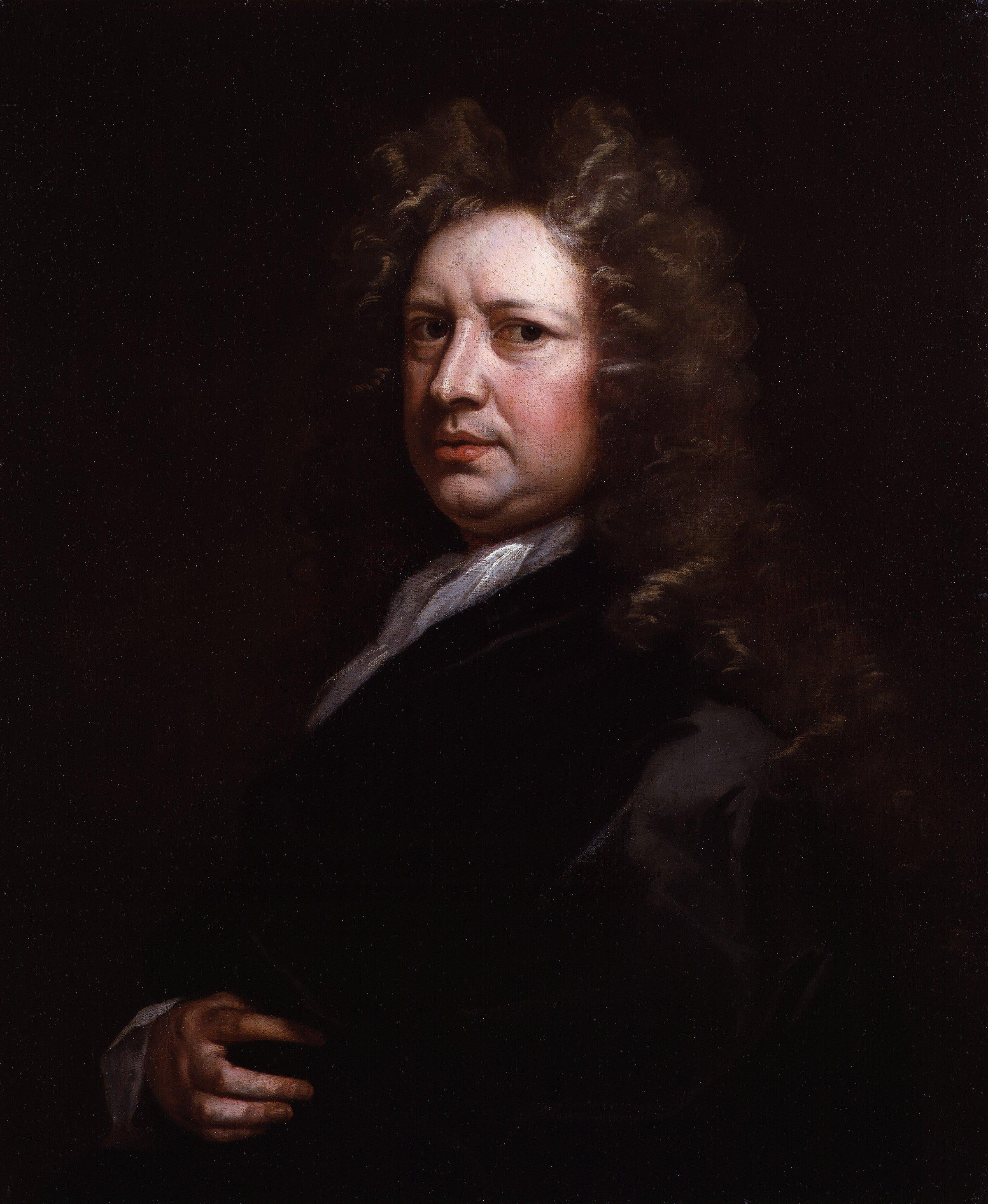
For a period there was only one licensed theatre company operating in London, under the management of Thomas Betterton's United Company.

The patent theatres were the theatres that were licensed to perform "spoken drama" after the Restoration of Charles II as King of England, Scotland and Ireland in 1660. Other theatres were prohibited from performing such "serious" drama, but were permitted to show comedy, pantomime or melodrama. Drama was also interspersed with singing or dancing, to prevent the whole being too serious or dramatic.

== Restoration era ==
Public entertainments, such as theatrical performances, were banned under the Puritan rule in the English Commonwealth. After he was restored to the throne, Charles II issued letters patent to Thomas Killigrew and William Davenant, granting them the monopoly right to form two London theatre companies to perform "serious" drama. The letters patent were reissued in 1662 with revisions allowing actresses to perform for the first time. Killigrew established his company, the King's Company, at the Theatre Royal, Drury Lane in 1663; Davenant established his company, the Duke's Company, in Lisle's Tennis Court in Lincoln's Inn Fields in 1661, later moving to Dorset Garden in 1671. In Dublin, the Theatre Royal opened in Smock Alley in 1662; this building survives and was reopened as a theatre in 2012.

After problems under the direction of Charles Killigrew, Thomas' son, the King's Company was taken over by the Duke's Company in 1682. The two companies merged, and the combined "United Company" continued under Thomas Betterton at Drury Lane. After some disagreements, Betterton obtained a licence from William III to form a new company at the old theatre in Lincoln's Inn Fields in 1695, which moved to the Theatre Royal, Covent Garden, in 1720 (now the Royal Opera House). The two patent theatres closed in the summer months. To fill the gap, several temporary theatres or fairs performed only in the summer. In 1705 the Queen's Theatre was established, originally for opera. Next was the Theatre Royal Haymarket in 1720; due to the influence of its later proprietor Samuel Foote, it became the third patent theatre in London in 1766.

== Spread across Britain and Ireland ==
Further letters patent were granted to theatres in other English and Irish towns and cities, including the Theatre Royal, Cork, in 1760; the Theatre Royal, Bath, in 1768; the Theatre Royal, Liverpool, in 1772; the Theatre Royal, Bristol, in 1778; the Theatre Royal, Waterford, in 1785; and the Theatre Royal, Birmingham, in 1807.

== Later years ==
These monopolies on the performance of "serious" plays were eventually revoked by the Theatres Act 1843, but censorship of the content of plays by the Lord Chamberlain under Robert Walpole's Theatrical Licensing Act 1737 continued until 1968.

== See also ==
- Legitimate theatre
- Penny gaff
- Theatre Royal
