= Licensing Act 1737 =

Act of the Parliament of Great Britain restricting free speech in theatres

- Act of Parliament
- Parliament of Great Britain
- Long title: An Act to explain and amend so much of an Act made in the Twelfth Year of the Reign of Queen Anne, intituled, "An Act for reducing the Laws relating to Rogues, Vagabonds, sturdy Beggars, and Vagrants, into One Act of Parliament; and for the more effectual punishing such Rogues, Vagabonds, sturdy Beggars, and Vagrants, and sending them whither they ought to be sent," as relates to common Players of Interludes.
- Citation: 10 Geo. 2. c. 28
- Territorial extent: Great Britain

Dates
- Royal assent: 21 June 1737
- Commencement: 24 June 1737 (Note: Section 1.)
- Repealed: 22 August 1843
Other legislation
Amends	Vagrants Act 1713
Repealed by	Theatres Act 1843

Status: Repealed

Text of statute as originally enacted

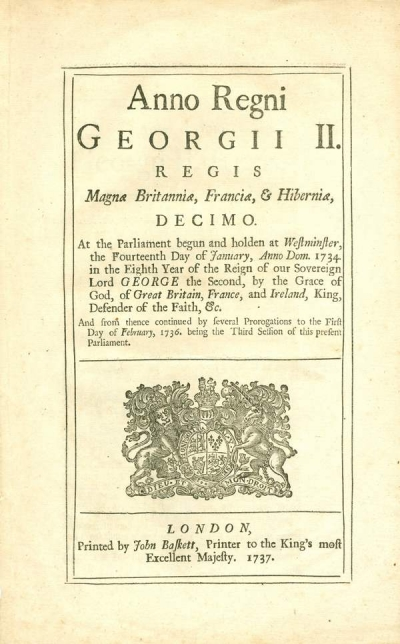
First page of the Licensing Act 1737, which established the office of Examiner of Plays

The Licensing Act 1737 (10 Geo. 2. c. 28), also known as the Theatrical Licensing Act 1737, Stage Licensing Act 1737 or Plays Act 1736, was an act of the Parliament of Great Britain, and a pivotal moment in British theatrical history. Its purpose was to control and censor what was being said about the British government through theatre. The act was repealed by the Theatres Act 1843 (6 & 7 Vict. c. 68), which was, in turn, replaced by the Theatres Act 1968. The Lord Chamberlain was the official censor and the office of Examiner of Plays was created under the act. The examiner assisted the Lord Chamberlain in the task of censoring all plays from 1737 to 1968. The examiner read all plays which were to be publicly performed, produced a synopsis and recommended them for license, consulting the Lord Chamberlain in cases of doubt. The act also created a legal distinction between categories of "legitimate theatre" and "illegitimate theatre".

== Forerunner ==
The function of censorship of plays for performance (at least in London) fell to the Master of the Revels by the time of the reign of Queen Elizabeth I. The power was used mostly with respect to matters of politics and religion (including blasphemy). It was certainly exercised by Edmund Tylney, who was Master from 1579 to 1610. Tylney and his successor, George Buck, also exercised the power to censor plays for publication. The Master of the Revels, who normally reported to the Lord Chamberlain, continued to perform the function until, with the outbreak of the English Civil War in 1642, stage plays were prohibited. Stage plays did not return to England until the Restoration in 1660. During the creation of the Licensing of 1737, Robert Walpole was the standing Master of the Revels

== Purpose of the act ==
Laws regulating theatre in the early 18th century were not strictly enforced. People had free rein to say anything they wanted through theatre, including all their troubles with the government. Free speech in theatre was seen as a threat to the government, facilitating the spread of revolutionary ideas. The act enhanced government control and censorship.

Opposition newspapers used the act as a warning precedent. In March 1742, The Champion claimed that, had Walpole remained in office, “the Liberty of the Press … could not have been preserved,” alleging that a bill had been prepared to subject printing to a licenser on the model of the stage restraints introduced in 1737.

In 1758, James Ralph’s pamphlet The Case of Authors by Profession or Trade, Stated argued that the 1737 licensing reduced venues and left theatre managers with excessive power over authors.

== Examiner of Plays ==
In addition to reading plays and writing Reader's Reports for the Lord Chamberlain the Examiners were expected to visit theatres to ensure their safety and comfort and to see that the Lord Chamberlain's rules were carried out with regard to the licences. They were also required to appear at subpoenas in law cases relating to licensing, and to examine Play Bills. From 1911 Examiners were required to write reports on plays for the Lord Chamberlain. A copy of the play script and Reader's Report were held by the Lord Chamberlain's office and are now held by the British Library in the Lord Chamberlain's Plays collection.

In the years 1922–1938 when The Earl of Cromer was the Lord Chamberlain nearly 13,000 plays were licensed, an average of 820 a year; under 200 plays were refused a licence, an average of 12 per year.

There were 21 Examiners of Plays between 1738 and 1968.

Date	Examiner	Notes
1738–1778	Chetwynd, William	
1738–1749	Odell, Thomas	Deputy Examiner
1749–1781	Capell, Edward	Deputy Examiner
1778–1824	Larpent, John	Assisted by his wife Anna Larpent
1824–1836	Colman, George	Known as 'Colman the Younger'
1836–1840	Kemble, Charles	
1840–1857	Kemble, John	
1857–1874	Donne, William Bodham	
1874–1895	Pigott, Edward Frederick Smyth	
1895–1911	Redford, George A.	
1911–1913	Brookfield, Charles	Joint examiner with Redford for one month in 1911
1913–1920	Bendall, Ernest Alfred	Joint Examiner 1914-1920
1914–1936	Street, George	Joint Examiner 1914-1920; Senior (Sole) Examiner 1920-1930; Joint Examiner 1930–1936
1930–1953	Game, Henry	Joint Examiner 1930-1936; Senior Examiner 1936-1953
1931–1968	Jones, Rev. Albert Evans	Welsh Reader
1936–1958	Dearmer, Geoffrey	Examiner 1936-1953; Senior Examiner 1953-1958
1937–1968	Heriot, Charles	Examiner 1937-1958; Senior Examiner 1947-1968
1952–1963	Troubridge, Lt-Col. Sir St Vincent	Assistant Examiner 1952-1963
1958–1965	Coles, Maurice	Assistant Examiner
1964–1968	Kyrle Fletcher, Ifan	Assistant Examiner
1965–1968	Harward, Timothy	Assistant Examiner

The Examiners had a variety of qualifications and experience for the position. Edward Pigott (1824–1895) was a journalist on the Daily News and had an extensive knowledge of European literature and languages. George Redford (d. 1916), a playwright, resigned his post in 1913 to become the first president of the British Board of Film Censors. Ernest Bendall (1846–1924) had been a clerk in the Paymaster-General's Office for 30 years retiring in 1896 to become a journalist and drama critic for several London newspapers. Charles Brookfield was an actor, playwright and journalist. George Street was an essayist, novelist and playwright. Henry Game (d. 1966) trained as an artist, was an amateur actor and was known for his knowledge of the theatre. Charles Heriot (d. 1972) was an actor and producer. Sir St Vincent Troubridge (1895–1963) was in the military as well as being a theatre historian. Ifan Kyrle Fletcher (d. 1969) was a theatre historian and antiquarian bookseller. Timothy Harward studied theatre and literature at university, becoming a theatre journalist for the Irish Times and lecturer at Regent Street Polytechnic.

== See also ==
- Censorship in the United Kingdom
- Lord Chamberlain
- Lord Chamberlain's Office
