= Goodman's Fields Theatre =

Several 18th-century theatres in London

Coordinates: 51.514812°N 0.071851°W

Two 18th-century theatres bearing the name Goodman's Fields Theatre were located on Alie Street, Whitechapel, London. The first opened on 31 October 1727 in a small shop by Thomas Odell, deputy Licenser of Plays. The first play performed was George Farquhar's The Recruiting Officer. Henry Fielding's second play The Temple Beau premièred here on 26 January 1730. Upon retirement, Odell passed the management on to Henry Giffard, after a sermon was preached against the theatre at St Botolph's, Aldgate. Giffard operated the theatre until 1732. After he left, the theatre was used for a variety of acrobatic performances.

Giffard constructed a new theatre down the street designed by Edward Shepherd who also designed the Royal Opera House, Covent Garden. The theatre opened with Henry IV, Part I, 2 October 1732 that included actors Thomas Walker, Richard Yates and Henry Woodward. A dispute at the Drury Lane Theatre bought the actress Sarah Thurmond and her husband to the theatre. With the passing of the Licensing Act 1737, the theatre was forced to close. Giffard rented Lincoln's Inn Fields Theatre briefly and then, with various political machinations, was able to reopen Goodman's Fields in 1740. The Winter's Tale was produced there in 1741 for the first time in over a century. The same year David Garrick made his successful début as Richard III. He also staged plays of his own including the 1741 farce The Lying Valet. The theatre closed 27 May 1742 and did not re-open. It was pulled down in 1746, and a further theatre built on the site, this briefly showed drama before it was converted to a warehouse and burned down in 1809.

During its heyday, the poet Gray noted in a letter to a friend, that "there are a dozen dukes of a night at Goodman's Fields sometimes".

The Oxford Companion to the Theatre notes that there may have been an earlier theatre named Goodman's Fields Theatre in the area around 1703.
