= 1813 in literature =

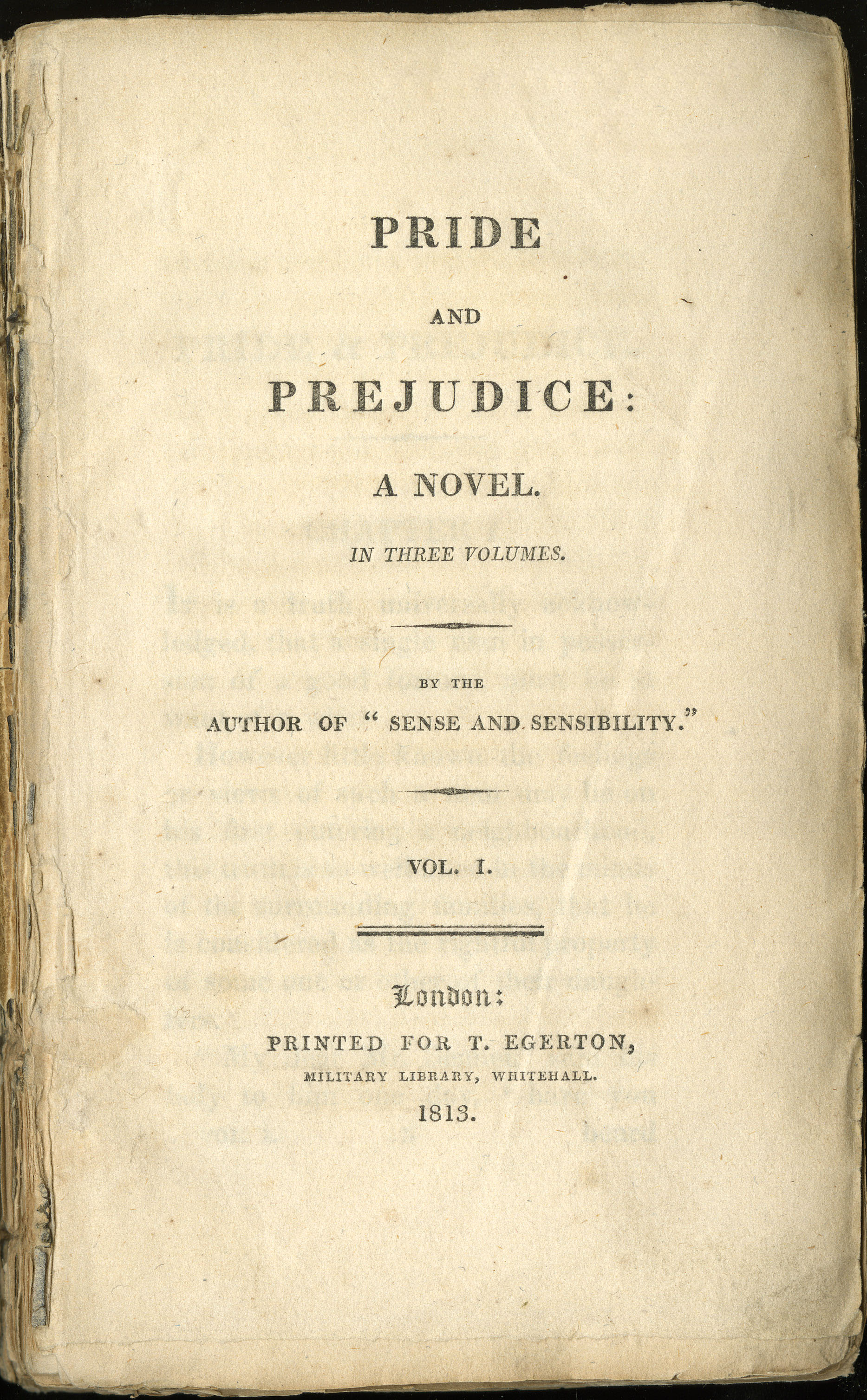
Title page from the first edition of the first volume of Pride and Prejudice

This article contains information about the literary events and publications of 1813.

== Events ==
- January 23 – Remorse, a new play by Samuel Taylor Coleridge, begins a three-week run at the Theatre Royal, Drury Lane, London.
- January 28 – Jane Austen's novel Pride and Prejudice is first published (as "by the author of Sense and Sensibility") in London. A second edition follows in November.
- February 3 – Leigh Hunt is imprisoned for a libel of the Prince Regent in The Examiner (1812). He continues his literary work in prison and will be visited there by Lord Byron, Thomas Moore, Charles and Mary Lamb, Charles Cowden Clarke, Maria Edgeworth, William Hazlitt, Jeremy Bentham, Lord Brougham and Benjamin Haydon.
- May 10 – The eccentric English amateur actor Robert Coates makes his London debut in his favourite role, Romeo, at the Theatre Royal, Haymarket.
- June 17–18 – The German poet and playwright Theodor Körner, fighting with the Königlich Preußisches Freikorps von Lützow in the German campaign against Napoleon (War of the Sixth Coalition), composes the sonnet "Abschied vom Leben" (Farewell to Life) while lying severely wounded.
- June – Following the death of Jean-François Cailhava de L'Estandoux, the historian and publicist Joseph François Michaud takes up Seat 29 of the Académie française.
- July – The first award of the Chancellor's Gold Medal for poetry at the University of Cambridge in England goes to George Waddington for "Columbus".
- August 25 – Theodor Körner composes the patriotic lyric "Schwertlied" (Sword Song) on the night before his death in action, aged 21.
- October 2 – The Philomathean Society of the University of Pennsylvania is founded. It is the oldest continuously existing literary society in the United States.
- Autumn – Robert Southey becomes Poet Laureate of the United Kingdom after Walter Scott declines the post.

== New books ==
=== Fiction ===
- Jane Austen – Pride and Prejudice
- Eaton Stannard Barrett – The Heroine, or: Adventures of a fair romance reader
- Willem Bilderdijk – Kort verhaal van eene aanmerklijke luchtreis, en nieuwe planeetontdekking (Short Account of a Remarkable Aerial Voyage and Discovery of a New Planet)
- Barbara Hofland – The Daughter-in-Law
- Regina Maria Roche – The Monastery of St. Columb
- Shikitei Sanba (式亭 三馬) – Ukiyoburo (浮世風呂, publication completed)
- Sarah Elizabeth Utterson – Tales of the Dead

=== Drama ===
- Samuel Taylor Coleridge – Remorse
- Richard Cumberland – The Sibly
- Robert Francis Jameson – The Students of Salamanca
- Jean-Antoine-Marie Monperlier – Les Chevaliers de Malte
- Thomas Morton – Education
- Amandus Gottfried Adolf Müllner – Die Schuld
- Jane M. Scott – The Forest Knight
- Matthäus Casimir von Collin – Der Tod Friedrichs des Streitbaren

=== Poetry ===
- Lord Byron – The Giaour
- Alessandro Manzoni – Inni sacri
- Mary Russell Mitford – Narrative Poems on the Female Character
- Percy Bysshe Shelley – Queen Mab: A Philosophical Poem

=== Non-fiction ===
- Charles Bucke – The Philosophy of Nature, or, the Influence of Scenery on the Mind and Heart
- Humphry Davy – Elements of Agricultural Chemistry in a Course of Lectures
- Joseph-Philippe-François Deleuze – Histoire critique de magnétisme animal
- Pierce Egan – Boxiana; or Sketches of Pugilism
- Johann Friedrich Herbart – Lehrbuch zur Einleitung in die Philosophie (Introductory Textbook in Philosophy)
- James Northcote – Memoirs of Sir Joshua Reynolds
- Robert Owen – A New View of Society
- James Cowles Prichard – Researches into the Physical History of Man
- Arthur Schopenhauer – On the Fourfold Root of the Principle of Sufficient Reason (Über die vierfache Wurzel des Satzes vom zureichenden Grunde)
- Percy Bysshe Shelley – A Vindication of Natural Diet
- Robert Southey – The Life of Nelson
- Germaine de Staël – De l'Allemagne (On Germany)

== Births ==
- January 23
  - Camilla Collett, Norwegian writer (died 1895)
  - Charles Harpur, Australian poet (died 1868)
- February 11 - Otto Ludwig, German novelist and playwright (died 1865)
- March 11 – William Watkiss Lloyd, English polymath (died 1863)
- March 18 – Christian Friedrich Hebbel, German poet and dramatist (died 1863)
- May 2 – Caroline Leigh Gascoigne, English poet, novelist, short story writer (died 1883)
- May 5 – Søren Kierkegaard, Danish philosopher (died 1855)
- May 20 – William Smith, English lexicographer (died 1893)
- October 17 – Georg Büchner, German dramatist, poet and writer (died 1837)
- unknown dates
  - Harriet Jacobs, African-American memoirist and abolitionist (died 1897)
  - Liu Xizai (刘熙载), Chinese scholar and literary critic (died 1881)

== Deaths ==
- January 1 – Gioacchino Navarro, Maltese priest and poet (born 1748)
- January 20 – Christoph Martin Wieland, German poet (born 1733)
- February 4 – James Whitelaw, Irish historian (born 1749)
- March 9 - Edward Williams, minister and theologian (born 1750)
- April 22 – Henry Clifford, English legal writer (born 1768)
- June 26 – Jean-François Cailhava de L'Estandoux, French dramatist, poet and critic (born 1731)
- August 10 – Mary Anne Burges, Scottish religious allegorist (born 1763)
- August 11 – Henry James Pye, English Poet Laureate (born 1745)
- August 26 – Theodor Körner, German poet and dramatist (killed in action, born 1791)
- October 11 – Robert Kerr, Scottish science writer and translator (born 1755)
- November 12 – J. Hector St. John de Crèvecœur, French-American writer (born 1735)
