= 1837 in literature =

This article contains information about the literary events and publications of 1837.

== Events ==
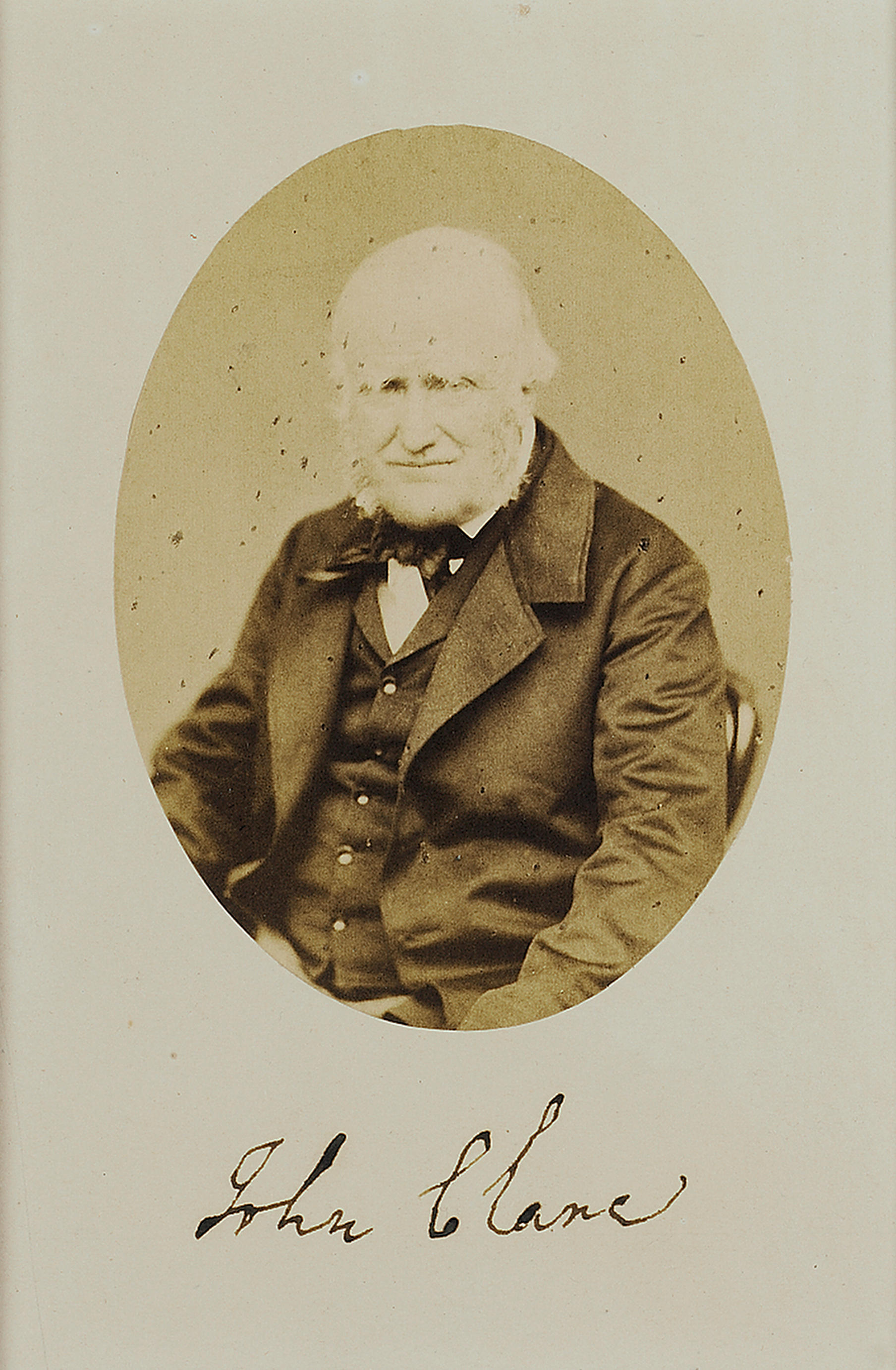
The only known photograph of John Clare, 1862

- June 16 – Charles Dickens is introduced to the actor William Macready by John Forster. The meeting took place backstage at a rehearsal of Othello.
- July – The English "peasant poet" John Clare first enters an insane asylum, at High Beach in Essex. During his early asylum years in High Beach, Essex (1837–1841), Clare re-wrote poems and sonnets by Lord Byron. Child Harold, his version of Byron's Childe Harold's Pilgrimage, became a lament for past lost love, and Don Juan, A Poem, an acerbic, misogynistic, sexualised rant, redolent of an ageing dandy. Clare also took credit for Shakespeare's plays, claiming to be William Shakespeare. "I'm John Clare now," the poet told a newspaper editor, "I was Byron and Shakespeare formerly."
- September – In Burton's Gentleman's Magazine (Philadelphia), William Evans Burton publishes an early example of the detective story, "The Secret Cell", featuring a London police officer and his wife.
- October – The United States Magazine and Democratic Review is first published.
- October 4 – Andreas Munch's first play, Kong Sverres Ungdom, opens the Christiania Theatre's new building in Norway.
- unknown date – The publishers Little, Brown and Company open their doors in Boston, Massachusetts.

== New books ==
=== Fiction ===
- W. Harrison Ainsworth – Crichton
- Honoré de Balzac
  - César Birotteau
  - Lost Illusions, Part I: The Two Poets
- Richard Harris Barham – The Ingoldsby Legends (serialization begins in Bentley's Miscellany)
- Robert Montgomery Bird – Nick of the Woods
- Edward Bulwer-Lytton – Ernest Maltravers
- Sara Coleridge – Phantasmion
- Hendrik Conscience – In 't Wonderjaar 1566
- Charles Dickens
  - Oliver Twist (serialization begins in Bentley's Miscellany, February)
  - The Pickwick Papers (serialization completed in November; first book publication)
- Benjamin Disraeli
  - Henrietta Temple
  - Venetia
- Lady Mary Fox – An Account of an Expedition to the Interior of New Holland
- Phillipe-Ignace François Aubert du Gaspé – L'Influence d'un livre
- Jeremias Gotthelf – Bauernspiegel
- Nathaniel Hawthorne – Twice-Told Tales
- Julia Kavanagh – Adele
- Letitia Elizabeth Landon (writing as L.E.L.) – Ethel Churchill, or The Two Brides
- Catharine Maria Sedgwick – Live and Let Live
- Victor Séjour – Le Mulâtre (earliest known work of African American fiction, published in Revue des Colonies, March)
- Mary Shelley – Falkner
- Frances Trollope – The Vicar of Wrexhill

=== Children and young people ===
- Hans Christian Andersen
  - Fairy Tales Told for Children. First Collection. Third Booklet (Eventyr, fortalte for Børn. Første Samling. Tredie Hefte) comprising "The Little Mermaid" ("Den lille havfrue") and "The Emperor's New Clothes" ("Kejserens nye klæder")
  - Only a Fiddler
- Georgiana Chatterton – Aunt Dorothy's Tales
- Frederick Marryat – Snarleyyow or the Dog Fiend
- George Ayliffe Poole – The Exile's Return; or a Cat's Journey from Glasgow to Edinburgh
- Robert Southey – "The Story of the Three Bears" (in The Doctor)

=== Drama ===
- Joanna Baillie – The Separation
- Manuel Bretón de los Herreros – Muérete y verás
- Robert Browning – Strafford
- Edward Bulwer-Lytton – The Duchess de la Vallière
- Juan Eugenio Hartzenbusch – Los Amantes de Teruel
- Henrik Hertz – Svend Dyrings Huus
- James Sheridan Knowles
  - The bridal
  - The Love Chase
- Alfred de Musset – Un caprice
- Jules-Édouard Alboize de Pujol – L'Idiote

=== Poetry ===
- José de Espronceda – El estudiante de Salamanca
- Louisa Jane Hall – Miriam, a Dramatic Sketch (written 1826)
- Alphonse de Lamartine – Chute d'un ange
- Alexander Pushkin – The Bronze Horseman (Медный всадник)
- See also 1837 in poetry

=== Non-fiction ===
- Charles Babbage – Ninth Bridgewater Treatise. On the Power, Wisdom and Goodness of God, as manifested in the Creation
- Charles Ball – Slavery in the United States: A Narrative of the Life and Adventures of Charles Ball, A Black Man
- Bernard Bolzano – Wissenschaftslehre (Theory of Science)
- Thomas Carlyle – The French Revolution: A History
- Washington Irving – The Adventures of Captain Bonneville
- John Gibson Lockhart – Memoirs of the Life of Sir Walter Scott
- Harriet Martineau – Society in America
- William H. Prescott – The History of Ferdinand and Isabella
- Ferenc Pulszky – Aus dem Tagebuch eines in Grossbritannien reisenden Ungarns (From the Diary of a Hungarian Travelling in Britain)
- Martin Tupper – Proverbial Philosophy
- Andrew Ure – A Dictionary of Arts, Manufactures and Mines
- Adelbert von Chamisso – Über die Hawaiische Sprache (On the Hawaiian Language)

== Births ==
- January 16 – Ellen Russell Emerson, American author and ethnologist (died 1907)
- January 23 – Agnes Maule Machar, Canadian novelist (died 1927)
- February 13 – Emily S. Bouton, American author, editor, and educator (died 1927)
- February 24 – Rosalía de Castro, Spanish Galician poet and writer (died 1885)
- March 1
  - Ion Creangă, Romanian raconteur (died 1889)
  - William Dean Howells, American realist novelist (died 1920)
- March 6 – Sully Prudhomme, French poet (died 1907)
- April 1 – Jorge Isaacs (Ferrer), Colombian writer, politician and explorer (died 1895)
- April 5 – Algernon Charles Swinburne, English poet (died 1909)
- April 7 – Lou Singletary Bedford, American author and editor (unknown year of death)
- June 9 – Anne Thackeray Ritchie, English novelist and essayist (died 1919)
- June 28 – Petre P. Carp, Romanian politician, polemicist, and translator (died 1919)
- July 13 – Mary Allen West, American writer, editor, and philanthropist (died 1892)
- August 24 – Bertha Jane Grundy, English novelist (died 1912)
- October 15 – Leo Königsberger, German historian of science (died 1921)
- October 21 – Mary Alice Seymour, American music critic and editor (died 1897)
- December 4 – Angie F. Newman, American poet, author, and editor (died 1910)
- December 10 – Edward Eggleston, American novelist and historian (died 1902)
- December 11 – Esther Saville Allen, American author (died 1913)
- December 17 – Celia Logan, American actress and playwright (died 1904)
- unknown dates
  - Teodor Boldur-Lățescu, Romanian journalist and publisher (died 1891)
  - Florence Caddy (née Tompson), English non-fiction writer (died 1923)
  - Anna Augusta Truitt, American essayist, philanthropist, and reformer (died 1920)

== Deaths ==
- February 7 – Mary Robinson (Maid of Buttermere), English literary muse (born 1778)
- February 10 (January 29 O.S.) – Alexander Pushkin, Russian poet (wound received in duel, born 1799)
- February 12 – Ludwig Börne, German Jewish political writer and satirist (born 1786)
- February 13 – Mariano José de Larra, Spanish author (suicide, born 1809)
- February 19 – Georg Büchner German dramatist, poet and author (typhus, born 1813).
- March 9 – Alexandru Hrisoverghi, Moldavian writer and translator (tabes dorsalis, born 1811)
- March 15 – Lukijan Mušicki, Serbian poet (born 1777)
- June 12 – Carl Friedrich Ernst Frommann, German bookseller (born 1765)
- June 14 – Giacomo Leopardi, Italian poet (cholera, born 1798)
- September 21 – Georg Ludolf Dissen, German philologist (born 1784)
- October 19 – Hendrik Doeff, Dutch travel writer (born 1764)
