= 1881 in literature =

This article contains information about the literary events and publications of 1881.

== Events ==
- February 13 – The first issue of the feminist newspaper La Citoyenne is published by Hubertine Auclert in France.
- March – Ambrose Bierce contributes to the weekly satirical San Francisco magazine The Wasp (becoming editor by July) and resumes his column "Prattle" and the series of cynical definitions which he first calls The Devil's Dictionary.
- April – William Poel's production of Shakespeare's Hamlet at St. George's Hall, London, reverts to the first quarto text and avoids elaborate scene changes.
- April 23 – Gilbert and Sullivan's comic opera Patience, a satire on Oscar Wilde and aestheticism, opens with George Grossmith in the lead at the Opera Comique in London.
- July 7 – Carlo Collodi's The Adventures of Pinocchio (Le avventure di Pinocchio), a children's story about a wooden puppet in Tuscany, begins to be serialized in the first issue of Giornale per i bambini, a supplement to the Roman Sunday newspaper Fanfulla della domenica.
- July 29 – The Law on the Freedom of the Press is passed in France.
- August 17 – The Pushkin Prize is established by the Russian Academy of Sciences.
- October 1 – Robert Louis Stevenson's children's pirate adventure novel Treasure Island begins serialization in the British magazine Young Folks as Treasure Island; or, The mutiny of the Hispaniola by "Captain George North".
- The S. Fischer Verlag publishing house is founded by Samuel Fischer in Berlin.
- The first of the three-volume History of Woman Suffrage, is published by Susan B. Anthony and Elizabeth Cady Stanton in the United States.
- Aleksey Konstantinovich Tolstoy's historical drama Tsar Boris (Царь Борис, published 1870) receives its première, posthumously, at Anna Brenko's Pushkin Theater in Moscow.
- The literary review and movement La Jeune Belgique is founded by the poet Max Waller (Léopold Warlomont).

== New books ==
=== Fiction ===
- William Harrison Ainsworth – Stanley Brereton
- Emilia Pardo Bazán – Un viaje de novios (A Honeymoon Trip)
- Mary Elizabeth Braddon – Asphodel
- Robert Buchanan – God and the Man
- Bankim Chatterjee – Rajsimha
- Wilkie Collins – The Black Robe
- Machado de Assis – The Posthumous Memoirs of Bras Cubas (Memorias Posthumas de Braz Cubas)
- Antonio Fogazzaro – Malombra
- Anatole France – Sylvestre Bonnard
- Thomas Hardy – A Laodicean
- Henry Honor (anonymously) – The Great Romance
- Joris-Karl Huysmans – En Ménage
- Robert G. Ingersoll – The Great Infidels
- Henry James – The Portrait of a Lady
- Nikolai Leskov – The Tale of Cross-eyed Lefty from Tula and the Steel Flea («Сказ о тульском косом Левше и о стальной блохе», Skaz o Tulskom kosom Levshe i o stalnoy Blokhe)
- Margaret Oliphant – Harry Joscelyn
- "Jack Saul" – The Sins of the Cities of the Plain
- Joseph Henry Shorthouse – John Inglesant
- Anthony Trollope – Doctor Wortle's School and Ayala's Angel
- Giovanni Verga – I Malavoglia (translated as The House by the Medlar-Tree)
- Jules Verne – Eight Hundred Leagues on the Amazon (La Jangada - Huit cents lieues sur l'Amazone)

=== Children and young people ===
- Joel Chandler Harris – Uncle Remus
- Talbot Baines Reed – The Fifth Form at St. Dominic's
- Bram Stoker – Under the Sunset
- Mrs. Humphry Ward – Milly and Olly

=== Drama ===
- Henrik Ibsen
  - Ghosts (Gengangere) (published)
  - Catiline (first performed (published 1850))
- William Young – Pendragon

=== Poetry ===
- Roden Noël – A Little Child's Monument

=== Non-fiction ===
- Abel Boyer (d. 1729) – Boyer's French-English and English-French Dictionary
- Florence Caddy – Lares et Penates, or, The Background of Life
- Thomas Carlyle – Reminiscences
- Jefferson Davis – The Rise and Fall of the Confederate Government
- Warren Felt Evans – The Divine Law of Cure
- Walter Gregor – Notes on the Folk-Lore of the North-East of Scotland
- Alice Diehl (as Aston Leigh) – The Story of Philosophy
- North-Western Provinces – Weekly Notes of Cases Decided by the High Court, N.-w. P
- Hermann Schultz – Die Lehre von der Gottheit Christi (The Lesson of Christ's Divinity)
- Alfred Percy Sinnett – The Occult World
- John Francon Williams – The Geography of the Oceans

== Births ==
- January 9
  - Lascelles Abercrombie, English poet and literary critic (died 1938)
  - Giovanni Papini, Italian writer (died 1956)
- January 18 – Gaston Gallimard, French publisher (died 1975)
- January 28 – Ruby M. Ayres, English romance novelist (died 1955)
- February 10 – Boris Zaytsev, Russian novelist and dramatist (died 1972)
- February 13 – Eleanor Farjeon, English children's writer and poet (died 1965)
- March 4 – Thomas Sigismund Stribling, American novelist (died 1965)
- March 14 – Eugeniu Ștefănescu-Est, Romanian poet, novelist and cartoonist (died 1980)
- March 17 – Kristian Elster, Norwegian novelist, literary historian and biographer (died 1947)
- March 25 – Mary Webb, English novelist (died 1927)
- April 14 – Husain Salaahuddin, Maldivian writer (died 1948)
- May 6 – Gregorio Martínez Sierra, Spanish playwright (died 1947)
- May 13 – Lima Barreto, Brazilian novelist and journalist (died 1922)
- June 24 – George Shiels, Northern Irish dramatist (died 1949)
- July 22 – Margery Williams, English-born American children's writer (died 1944)
- August 1 – Rose Macaulay, English novelist, biographer and travel writer (died 1958)
- August 2 – Ethel M. Dell, English romantic fiction writer (died 1939)
- August 10 – Witter Bynner, American poet and scholar (died 1968)
- August 24 – Nicolae Petrescu-Comnen, Romanian social scientist, historian and poet (died 1958)
- October 5 – Barbu Lăzăreanu, Romanian literary historian, poet, and communist journalist (died 1957)
- October 15 – P. G. Wodehouse, English-born American humorous novelist (died 1975)
- October 30 – Elizabeth Madox Roberts, American novelist and poet (died 1941)
- November 28 – Stefan Zweig, Austrian novelist and playwright (died 1942)

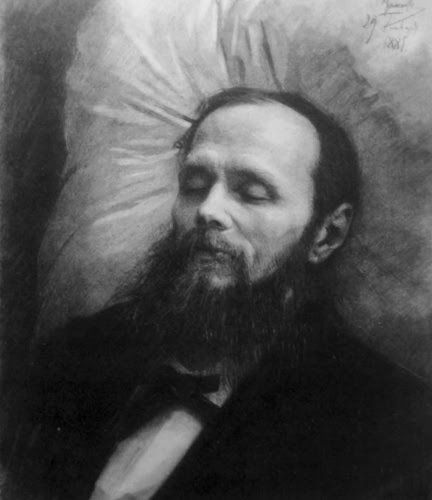
Dostoyevsky on his bier, drawing by Ivan Kramskoi

== Deaths ==
- January 12 – George Robert Aberigh-Mackay, Anglo-Indian author (tetanus, born 1848)
- January 28 – Fyodor Dostoevsky, Russian novelist (born 1821)
- January 30 – Anna Maria Hall, Irish novelist (born 1800)
- February 5 – Thomas Carlyle, Scottish essayist, historian and philosopher (born 1795)
- March 23 – George Métivier, Guernsey poet writing in Guernésiais (born 1790)
- April 19 – Benjamin Disraeli, English novelist and politician (born 1804)
- April 24 – James T. Fields, American publisher (born 1817)
- July 1 – Hermann Lotze, German philosopher (born 1817)
- July 12 – Caroline Leakey, English poet and novelist (born 1827)
- October 13 – Mary Emma Ebsworth, English dramatist (born 1794)
- November 1 – Jacques Perk, Dutch poet (born 1859)
- December 13 – August Šenoa, Croatian novelist and critic (born 1804)
- unknown date – Liu Xizai (刘熙载), Chinese scholar and literary critic (born 1813)
