= Joseph-François Michaud =

French academic (1767–1839)

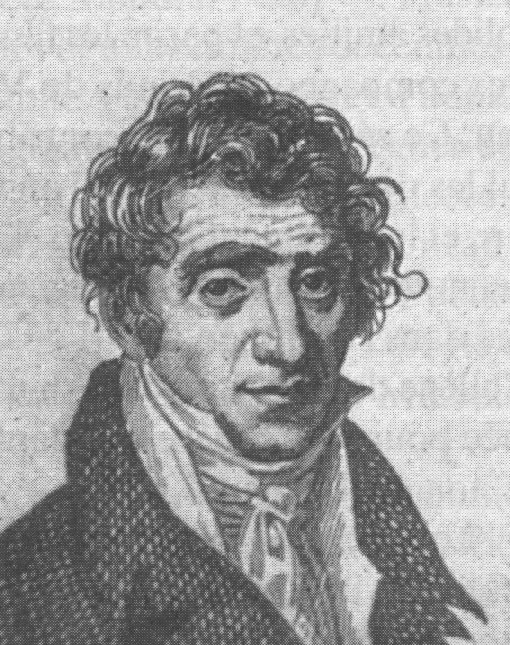
Joseph–François Michaud

Joseph–François Michaud (French pronunciation: [ʒozɛf fʁɑ̃swa miʃo]; 19 June 1767 – 30 September 1839) was a French historian and publicist.

== Biography ==
Michaud was born at either La Biolle or Albens in the Duchy of Savoy (then a part of the Holy Roman Empire and a possession of the King of Sardinia). He was educated at Bourg-en-Bresse, and afterwards engaged in literary work at Lyon, where the French Revolution first aroused the strong dislike of revolutionary principles which manifested itself throughout the rest of his life. In 1791 he went to Paris, where, at great risk to his own safety, he took part in editing several royalist journals. One of those was the Gazette universelle that he founded together with Pascal Boyer and Antoine Marie Cerisier. It was very successful until it was suppressed in August 1792 and its editors had to flee to escape arrest. In 1796 he became editor of La Quotidienne, for which he was arrested after the 13th of Vendémiaire; he evaded his captors, but was sentenced to death in absentia by the military council. Having resumed the editorship of his newspaper on the establishment of the French Directory, he was again proscribed on the 18th of Fructidor, but after two years returned to Paris, when the Consulate had superseded the Directory.

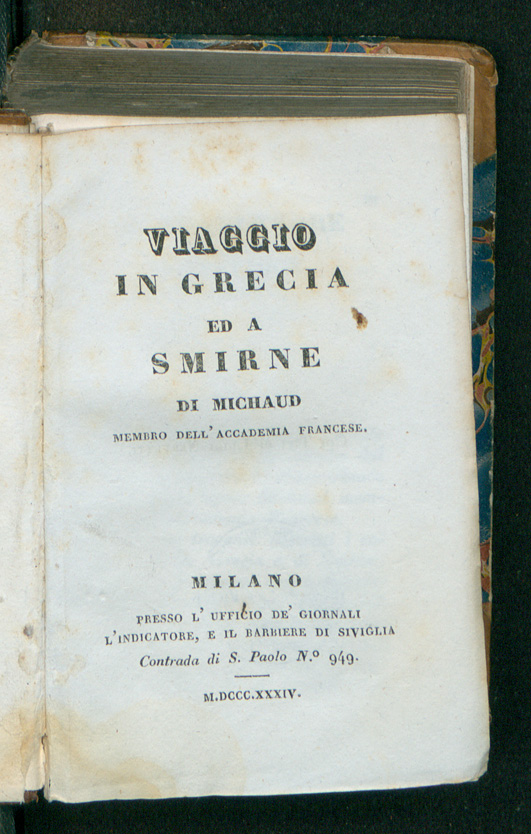
Viaggio in Grecia ed a Smirne, 1834

His Bourbon sympathies led to a brief imprisonment in 1800, and on his release he temporarily abandoned journalism, and began to write and edit books. In 1806, with his brother Louis Gabriel Michaud and two colleagues, he published Biographie moderne ou dictionnaire des hommes qui se sont fait un nom en Europe, depuis 1789, the earliest work of its kind. In 1811 published the first volume of his Histoire des Croisades (History of the Crusades) and also the first volume of his Biographie Universelle. In 1813 he was elected Academician, taking up the vacancy left by the death of Jean-François Cailhava de L'Estandoux. In 1814 he resumed the editorship of La Quotidienne. His brochure Histoire des quinze semaines ou le dernier règne de Bonaparte (1815) met with extraordinary success, passing through twenty-seven editions within a very short time.

His political services were now rewarded with the cross of an officer in the Legion of Honour and the modest post of king's reader, of which last he was deprived in 1827 for having opposed Peyronnet's "Loi d'Amour" against the freedom of the Press. In 1830-1831 he travelled in Syria and Egypt for the purpose of collecting additional materials for the Histoire des Croisades; his correspondence with a fellow explorer, Jean Joseph François Poujoulat, consisting practically of discussions and elucidations of various points in that work, was afterwards published (Correspondance d'Orient, 7 vols., 1833–1835). Like the Histoire, it is more interesting than exact. The Bibliothèque des croisades, in four volumes more, contained the "Pièces justificatives" of the Histoire. Michaud died at Passy, where his home had been since 1832.

== Works ==
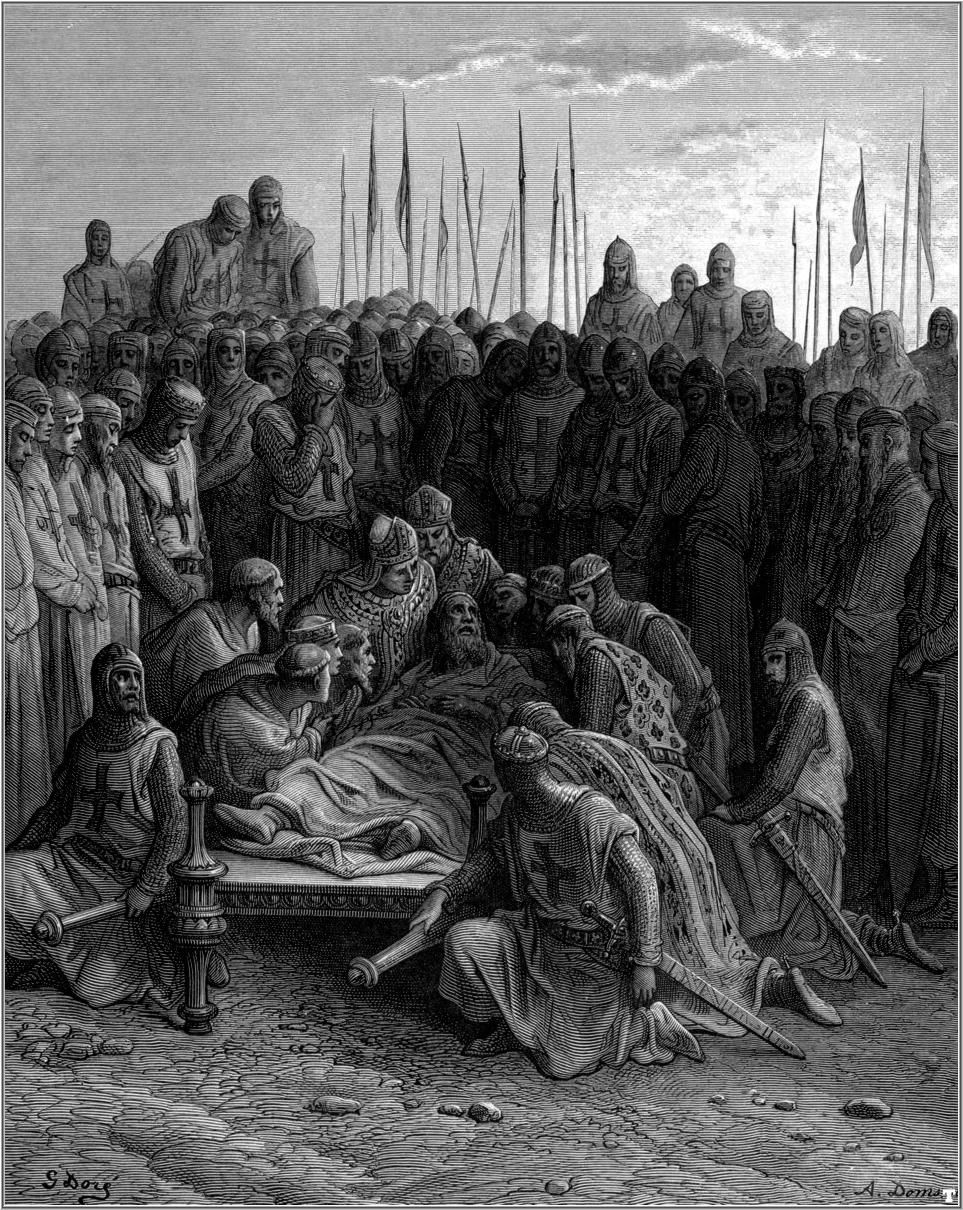
"The Death of Baldwin" (1875), one of 100 plates prepared for a posthumous edition of Michaud's History of the Crusades by Gustave Doré

Michaud's Histoire des croisades was published in its final form in six volumes in 1840 under the editorship of his friend Jean Joseph François Poujoulat. This was translated to The History of the Crusades (1852) by British author William Robson (1785–1863), with a biographical notice on Michaud by American essayist Hamilton W. Mabie. Michaud, along with Poujoulat, also edited Nouvelle collection des mémoires pour servir de l'histoire de France (32 vols., 1836–1844). See Sainte-Beuve, Causeries du lundi, vol. vii.

In 1875, the famous illustrator Gustave Doré produced 100 pictures for a 2 volume medium folio edition of the Histoire which was published by Hachette and Company. A detailed discussion and critique of the Histoire des croisades was done by British historian of the Crusades Christopher Tyerman in his The Debate on the Crusades, 1099–2010 (2011).

== Notes ==
Cultural offices
Preceded by Jean-François Cailhava	Seat 29; Académie française 1813-1839	Succeeded by Jean Pierre Flourens
