= Adelphi Theatre =

West End theatre in London

- 1806 Sans Pareil; 1844 Adelphi; 1858 New Adelphi; 1901 Century Theatre; 1930 Royal Adelphi
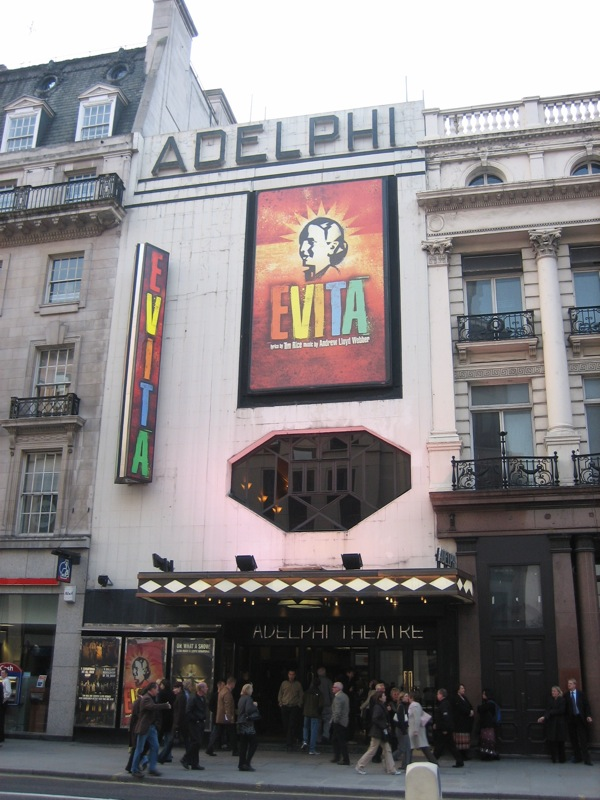
- Adelphi Theatre in 2007
- Interactive map of Adelphi Theatre
- Address: Strand; London, WC2; United Kingdom
- Coordinates: 51°30′36″N 0°07′22″W
- Owner: Nederlander Organization / LW Theatres
- Capacity: 1,500 seated
- Type: West End theatre
- Designation: Grade II
- Production: The Lives of Others
- Public transit: Charing Cross; Charing Cross

Construction
- Opened: 1806
- Rebuilt: 1840 Samuel Beazley (new facade); 1858 T.H. Wyatt and Stephen Salter; 1901 Ernest Runtz; 1930 Ernest Schaufelberg
- Architect: John and Jane Scott

Website
- LW Theatres official Web Site

The Adelphi Theatre /əˈdɛlfi/ is a West End theatre, located on the Strand in the City of Westminster, central London. The present building is the fourth on the site. The theatre has specialised in comedy and musical theatre, and today it is a receiving house for a variety of productions, including many musicals. The theatre was Grade II listed for historical preservation on 1 December 1987.

== History ==
=== 19th century ===
It was founded in 1806 as the Sans Pareil ("Without Compare"), by merchant John Scott, and his daughter Jane (1770–1839). Jane was a British theatre manager, performer, and playwright. Together, they gathered a theatrical company and by 1809 the theatre was licensed for musical entertainments, pantomime, and burletta. She wrote more than fifty stage pieces in an array of genres: melodramas, pantomimes, farces, comic operettas, historical dramas, and adaptations, as well as translations. Jane Scott retired to Surrey in 1819, marrying John Davies Middleton (1790–1867).

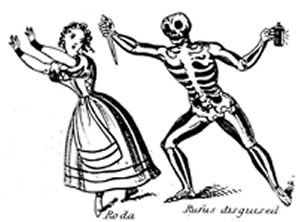
Sketch of a scene from Jane Scott's 1816 play, The Old Oak Chest

On 18 October 1819, the theatre reopened under its present name, which was adopted from the Adelphi Buildings opposite.

In its early years, the theatre was known for melodrama, called Adelphi Screamers. Many stories by Charles Dickens were also adapted for the stage here, including John Baldwin Buckstone's The Christening, a comic burletta, which opened on 13 October 1834, based on the story The Bloomsbury Christening. This is notable for being thought the first Dickens adaption performed. This was the first of many of Dickens's early works adapted for the stage of the Adelphi, including The Pickwick Papers as William Leman Rede's The Peregrinations of Pickwick; or, Boz-i- a-na, a three-act burletta first performed on 3 April 1837, Frederick Henry Yates's production of Nicholas Nickleby; or, Doings at Do-The-Boys Hall in November and December 1838, and Edward Stirling's two-act burletta The Old Curiosity Shop; or, One Hour from Humphrey's Clock (November and December 1840, January 1841). The theatre itself makes a cameo appearance in The Pickwick Papers

The famous busker, Billy Waters often performed outside the Adelphi Theatre in the years before his death in 1823.

The Adelphi came under the management of Madame Celeste and comedian Benjamin Webster, in 1844, and Buckstone was appointed its resident dramatist. Dramatisations of Dickens continued to be performed, including A Christmas Carol; or, Past, Present, and Future opening on 5 February; and Beckett's The Chimes: A Goblin Story of Some Bells that rang an Old Year out and a New One In. In 1848, The Haunted Man and the Ghost's Bargain was performed.

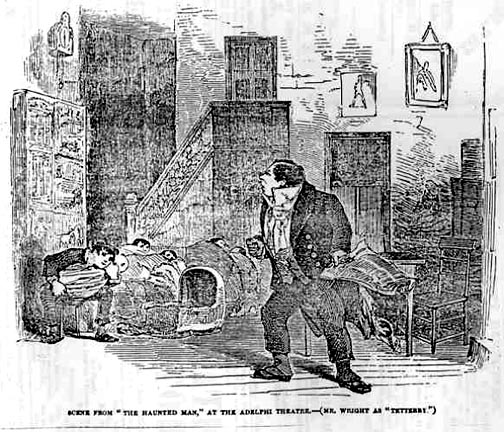
Charles Dickens' The Haunted Man and the Ghost's Bargain at the Adelphi, in the Illustrated London News, 30 December 1848

The old theatre was demolished, and on 26 December 1858, The New Adelphi was opened and was considered an improvement on the cramped circumstances of the original, which had been described as a "hasty conversion from a tavern hall, permanently kept in its provisional state". The new theatre could seat 1,500 people, with standing room for another 500. The interior was lighted by a Stroud's Patent Sun Lamp, a brilliant array of gas mantles passed through a chandelier of cut-glass.

In the mid-19th century, John Lawrence Toole established his comedic reputation at the Adelphi. Also in the mid-19th century, the Adelphi hosted a number of French operettas, including La belle Hélène. In 1867, however, the Adelphi gave English comic opera a boost by hosting the first public performance of Arthur Sullivan's first opera, Cox and Box.

The building was renovated in 1879 and again in 1887 when the house next door, along with The Hampshire Hog in The Strand and the Nell Gwynne Tavern in Bull Inn Court, were bought by the Gattis in order to enlarge the theatre. They also built a new enlarged facade and part of this can still be seen today above the Crystal Rooms next door to the present Adelphi Theatre.

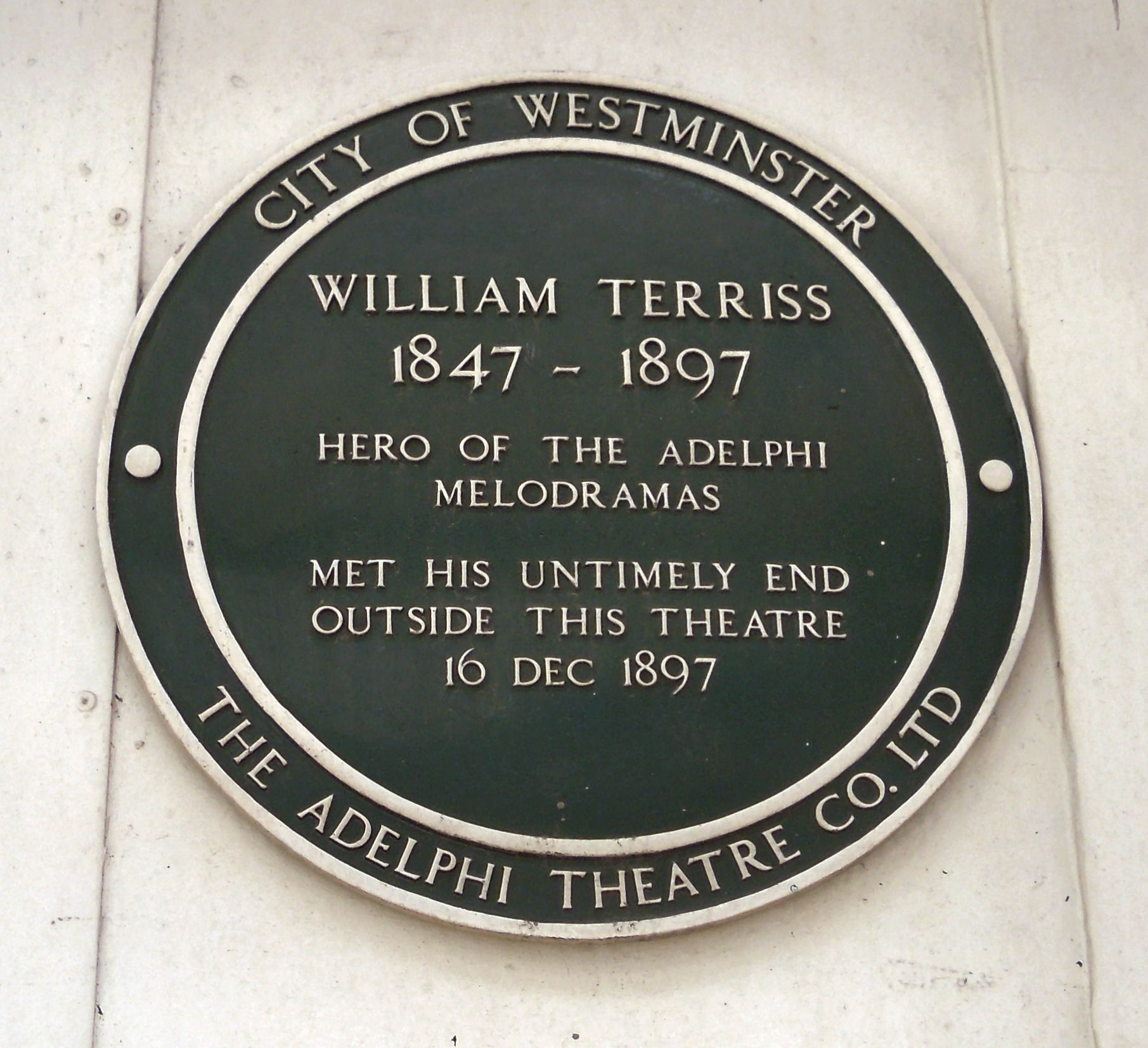
Plaque commemorating William Terriss beside the stage door of the Adelphi Theatre

An actor who performed regularly at the Adelphi in the latter half of the 19th century, William Terriss, was stabbed to death during the run of 'Secret Service' on 16 December 1897 whilst entering the Theatre by the royal entrance in Maiden Lane which he used as a private entrance. This is now recorded on a plaque on the wall by the stage door. Outside a neighbouring pub, a sign says that the killer was one of the theatre's stage hands, but Richard Archer Prince committed the murder. It has been said that Terriss' ghost haunts the theatre. Terriss' daughter was Ellaline Terriss, a famous actress, and her husband, actor-manager Seymour Hicks managed the Adelphi for some years at the end of the 19th century. The stage door of the current Adelphi is in Maiden Lane but back then it was in Bull Inn Court. William Terriss would later have a Theatre named after him, the Terriss Theatre in Rotherhithe, later known as the Rotherhithe Hippodrome.

The adjacent, numbers 409 and 410 Strand, were built in 1886–87 by the Gatti Brothers as the Adelphi Restaurant. The frontage remains essentially the same, but with plate glass windows, and, like the theatre, is a Grade II listed building.

=== 20th century ===
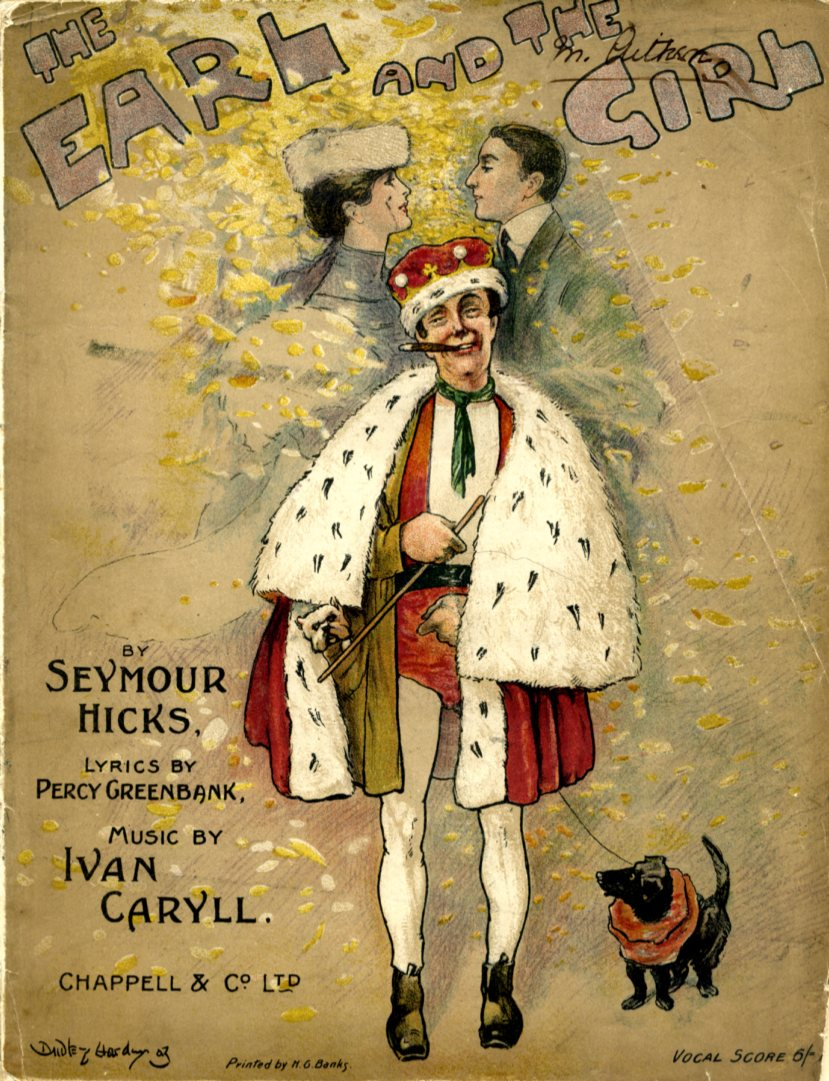
Cover of Vocal Score of Seymour Hicks' The Earl and the Girl

On 11 September 1901, the third theatre was opened as the Century Theatre, although the name reverted in 1904 under the management of Otho Stuart. This theatre was built by Frank Kirk to the design of Ernest Runtz. George Edwardes, the dean of London musical theatre, took over management of the theatre from Stuart in 1908. In the early part of the 20th century, the Adelphi was home to a number of musical comedies, the most successful of which included The Earl and the Girl (1904), The Dairymaids (1907), The Quaker Girl (1910), The Boy (1917), Clowns in Clover (1927), and Mr. Cinders (1929).

The present Adelphi opened on 3 December 1930, redesigned in the Art Deco style by Ernest Schaufelberg. It was named the 'Royal Adelphi Theatre' and re-opened with the hit musical Ever Green, by Lorenz Hart and Richard Rodgers, based on the book Benn W. Levy. Noël Coward's Words and Music premièred at the theatre in 1932. The operetta Balalaika (a revised version of The Gay Hussars) played at the theatre in 1936, and in 1940 the theatre's name again reverted to 'The Adelphi'. The theatre continued to host comedy and musicals, including Bless The Bride (1947), Maggie May (1964), and A Little Night Music (1975), as well as dramas (see below for a list of productions beginning in 1979).

A proposed redevelopment of Covent Garden by the GLC in 1968 saw the theatre under threat, together with the nearby Vaudeville, Garrick, Lyceum and Duchess theatres. An active campaign by Equity, the Musicians' Union, and theatre owners under the auspices of the Save London Theatres Campaign led to the abandonment of the scheme.

On 27 February 1982, the Adelphi hosted the final night of the D'Oyly Carte Opera Company for a concert performance of songs from all thirteen Savoy Operas as well as Cox and Box and Thespis. In 1993, Andrew Lloyd Webber's Really Useful Group purchased the theatre and completely refurbished it prior to the opening of his adaptation of Sunset Boulevard. The 1998 video of Lloyd Webber's musical Cats was filmed at the theatre.

=== 21st century ===
In November 1997, the London production of the popular American musical Chicago premiered at the Adelphi, becoming the venue's longest-ever production during its eight-and-a-half-year run (which also made it the longest running American musical in West End history). In April 2006, Chicago transferred to the Cambridge Theatre (and later to the Garrick Theatre, where it closed in 2012.).

Michael Grandage's revival of Andrew Lloyd Webber's Evita replaced the show, beginning previews on 2 June 2006 before completing a twelve-month run on 26 May 2007. Brian Wilson performed his album Pet Sounds for the last time in the UK at the Adelphi in November 2006. From 6 July 2007, the Adelphi was home to another Lloyd Webber revival, Joseph and the Amazing Technicolor Dreamcoat. The actor playing Joseph, Lee Mead, was cast by winning the BBC television show Any Dream Will Do, and starred alongside Preeya Kalidas and Dean Collinson.

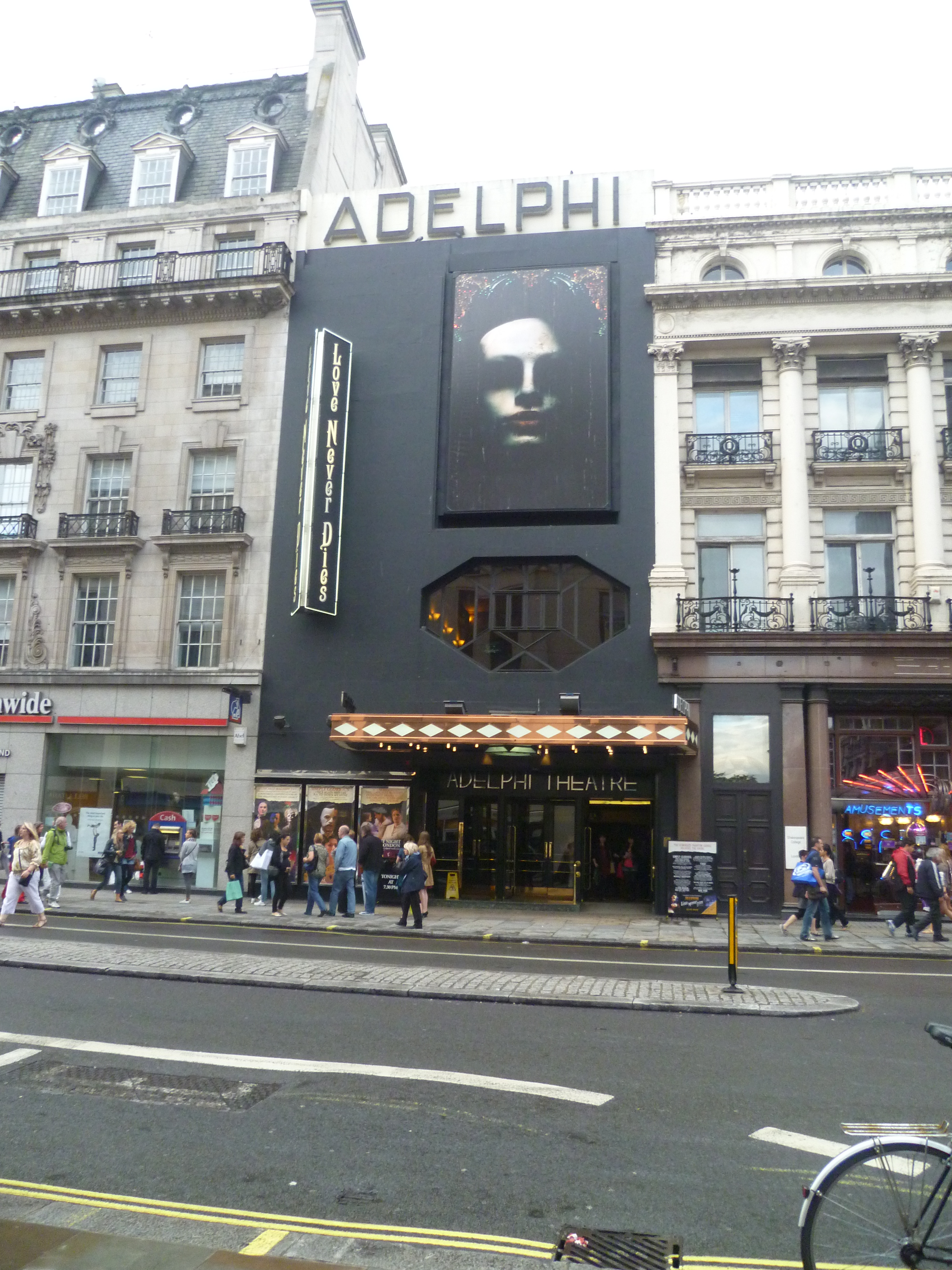
The Adelphi Theatre, 27 August 2011

9 March 2010 saw the premiere of the Andrew Lloyd Webber musical, Love Never Dies, which closed on Saturday 27 August 2011. The National Theatre transferred their show One Man, Two Guvnors to the theatre from 8 November 2011. This production moved out of the theatre on 25 February 2012, transferring to the Theatre Royal Haymarket, London.

Sweeney Todd, the Demon Barber of Fleet Street began a limited season at the Adelphi from 10 March to 22 September 2012, transferring from the Chichester Festival Theatre, starring Michael Ball and Imelda Staunton.

In March 2019, Waitress opened at the Adelphi. It was set to close on 4 July 2020, but it closed on 16 March, when West End theatres shut down due to the COVID-19 pandemic; the producers later announced the show would not re-open.

The theatre is currently owned and managed by the Adelphi Theatre Company Limited, a partnership between Andrew Lloyd Webber's LW Theatres and Nederlander International.

== Productions ==
Production	Opening date	Closing date
My Fair Lady	25 October 1979	31 October 1981
The 1981–82 D'Oyly Carte Opera Company Season	11 November 1981	27 February 1982
The American Dream Machine	20 October 1982	1 December 1982
Marilyn! the Musical	17 March 1983	30 July 1983
Poppy	12 November 1983	4 February 1984
Lena Horne – The Lady and Her Music	6 August 1984	29 September 1984
The Jungle Book	4 December 1984	12 January 1985
Me and My Girl	12 February 1985	16 January 1993
Sunset Boulevard	12 July 1993	5 April 1997
Damn Yankees	4 June 1997	9 August 1997
Chicago	19 November 1997	22 April 2006
Evita	20 June 2006	26 May 2007
Joseph and the Amazing Technicolor Dreamcoat	6 July 2007	30 May 2009
Derren Brown: Enigma	15 June 2009	23 July 2009
The Rat Pack: Live from Las Vegas	24 September 2009	2 January 2010
Love Never Dies	9 March 2010	27 August 2011
One Man, Two Guvnors	21 November 2011	25 February 2012
Sweeney Todd: The Demon Barber of Fleet Street	10 March 2012	22 September 2012
The Bodyguard	6 November 2012	29 August 2014
Made in Dagenham	5 November 2014	11 April 2015
Kinky Boots	21 August 2015	12 January 2019
Bumblescratch	4 September 2016	
Waitress	6 March 2019	16 March 2020
Back to the Future: The Musical	20 August 2021	12 April 2026
Queenz: Drag Me To The Disco	31 March 2026	
The Comedy about Spies	1 August 2026	26 September 2026

== Bibliography ==
- Nelson, Alfred and Cross, Gilbert. The Adelphi Theatre 1806–1900: A Calendar of Performances
- Guide to British Theatres 1750–1950, John Earl and Michael Sell pp. 96–7 (Theatres Trust, 2000) ISBN 0-7136-5688-3
