= Peyronnet =

Peyronnet is a French surname that may refer to

- Albert Peyronnet (1862–1958), French politician
- Dominique-Paul Peyronnet (1872-1943), French naïve painter
- Jean-Claude Peyronnet (born 1940), French politician
- Pierre-Denis, Comte de Peyronnet (1778–1854), French politician

== See also ==
- Le Clos du Peyronnet, an arts and crafts garden in Menton, France
