= Jean Joseph François Poujoulat =

French historian and journalist

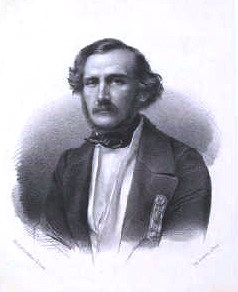
Jean Joseph François Poujoulat

Jean Joseph François Poujoulat (French pronunciation: [ʒɑ̃ ʒozɛf fʁɑ̃swa puʒula]; 28 January 1808, Montferrand-la-Fare – 5 January 1880, Paris) was a French historian and journalist.

Poujoulat was co-author with Joseph François Michaud of the Bibliothèque des Croisades, and traveled with him through European and Asiatic Turkey in the study of the scenes of the Crusades. On their return, they published in 1832-35 the Correspondence d'Orient. An ardent royalist, and bitterly opposed to the advent of Louis-Philippe to the throne in 1830, he made himself felt in politics through contributions to the Quotidienne. Having cultivated the fear of republics among the middle classes of France, he helped prepare the ground for the coup d'état of Napoleon in 1851; but was determined to war with the new government of Louis-Philippe, through the columns of the Union, the Revue des Deux Mondes, and other journals. His Histoire de Jérusalem, a religious and philosophical study, was crowned by the French Academy in 1840-42; his Histoire de St. Augustin in 1844 was similarly praised. In 1863, he published a review of Renan's Life of Jesus. He was a prolific author of works, mainly on religious history and its current discussions. In "The French Revolution" (orig. ed. 1856) he announce "pour l'honneur de notre pays et la vérité, les crimes ne furent pas de la révolution française". The first legitimist enforced both Chateaubriand and Tocqueville so prised by our "demi-suivants" but "vrais cuistres" selon the expression of Bourdieu. Completely unknown by the official thuriferaires of the capital (Furet, Nolte, Courtois).
