= Le Clos du Peyronnet =

Garden in Menton, France

Coordinates: 43°47′08″N 7°31′24″E

Le Clos du Peyronnet is an Arts and Crafts garden on Avenue Aristide Briand in Menton, in the Alpes-Maritimes department on the French Riviera. The gardens of the villa were designed by Humphry Waterfield in the early 20th-century, and have remained in the ownership of the Waterfield family ever since. Though privately owned, the garden is occasionally open to the public.

The garden is located on a strictly sloping site divided into terraces, with a series of cascading pools filtering into a fishpond at the bottom.
