= The Students of Salamanca =

1813 play

- Sheet music from the play
- Original language: English
- Written by: Robert Francis Jameson
- Genre: Comedy
- Setting: Salamanca, Spain

Premiere
- Date: 23 January 1813
- Place: Covent Garden Theatre, London

The Students of Salamanca is an 1813 comedy play by the British writer Robert Francis Jameson. It was first performed at the Covent Garden Theatre in London. The original cast included John Fawcett and Maria Theresa Kemble.

== Bibliography ==
- Nicoll, Allardyce. A History of Early Nineteenth Century Drama 1800-1850. Cambridge University Press, 1930.
