= Mary Alice Seymour =

American musician, author, elocutionist and critic

Lady Mary Alice Seymour
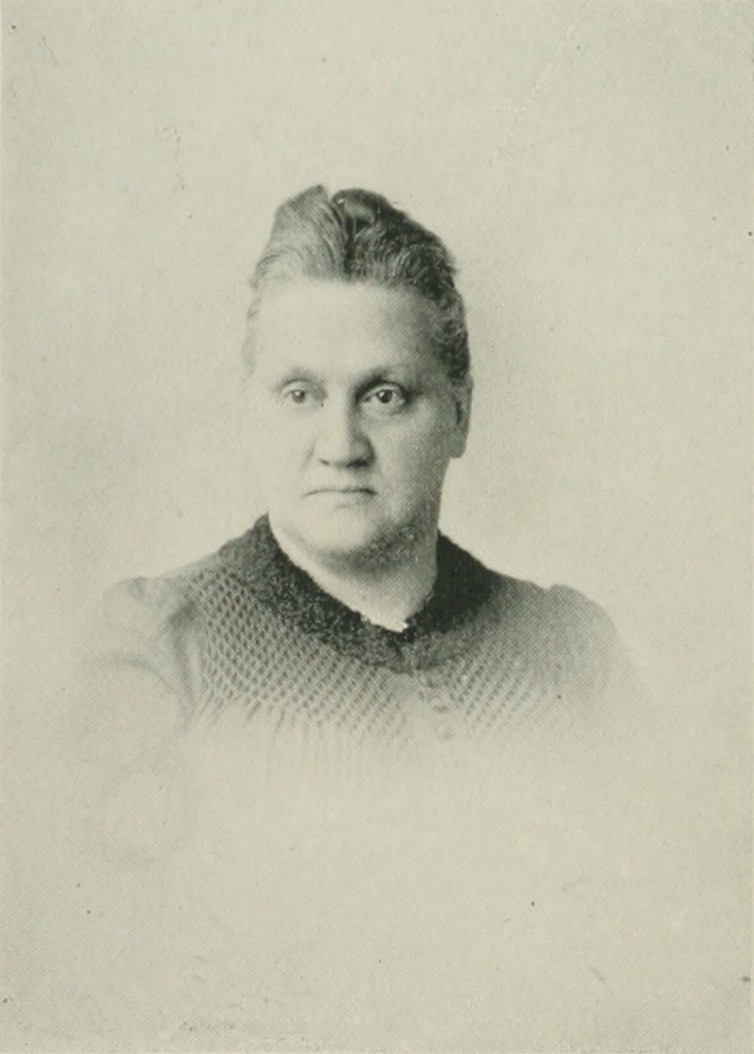
- Photo in A Woman of the Century
- Born: Mary Alice Ives; October 21, 1837; Brooklyn, New York, U.S.
- Died: May 12, 1897 (aged 59); Louisville, Kentucky, U.S.
- Resting place: Cave Hill Cemetery, Louisville, Kentucky
- Occupations: musician, author, critic
- Spouse(s): William Wood Seymour (m. 1865), Abraham G. Fonda (m. 1888)
- Writing career
- Pen name: Octavia Hensel
- Language: English
- Subject: music

Lady Mary Alice Seymour (née, Ives; after first marriage, Seymour; after second marriage, Fonda; pen and stage name, Octavia Hensel; October 21, 1837 – May 12, 1897) was a 19th-century American musician, author, elocutionist, and critic. She was referred to as "Octavia Hensel" in the music world, where she was an internationally known music critic. As a critic, Seymour was renowned. Her musical nature, her superior education, her thorough knowledge of the laws of theory and familiarity with the works of the great composers of the classic, romantic and Wagnerian schools, and the later schools of harmony, gave her a point of vantage above the ordinary. She was one of the original staff writers on the Musical Courier, having been its correspondent from Vienna and other European centers. Seymour played the piano, harp, guitar and organ, but never appeared on the stage, except for charitable events, as her relatives were opposed to her pursuing a professional life. A "confirmed bluestocking", Seymour was also a polyglot who spoke seven languages fluently: German, French, Spanish, Italian, Portuguese, Romanian, and Hungarian dialects.

== Early life and education ==
Mary Alice Ives was born in Brooklyn, New York, October 21, 1837. She was descended from General Michael Jackson, of Newton, Massachusetts, who commanded a regiment of minutemen in the battle of Lexington. His son, Amasa Jackson, was the first president of the Union Bank of New York, in 1812. He was married to Mary Phelps, the only daughter and heiress of Oliver Phelps, of Boston, who, with Nathaniel Gorham purchased in the interior of New York State from the Seneca nation the tract of land now known as the Phelps and Gorham Purchase. Mary Charlotte Jackson, the grandmother of Mrs. Seymour, was married to Ralph Olmstead, of New York.

Seymour's parents were Mary Phelps (Olmstead) Ives and George Russell Ives. He was a Presbyterian minister from Vermont and also a Brooklyn commission merchant.

Fonda had a pleasant childhood. Her parents were surrounded by literary people, and her early taste tended toward literature. In Paris, she studied under Louis Moreau Gottschalk.

== Career ==
In 1865, she married Rev. William Wood Seymour, an Episcopal clergyman at one time connected with Trinity Parish, New York.

In 1868–70, in Vermont, notices appeared in the press regarding Seymour's dramatic readings and recitations as an elocutionist.

Mr. Seymour died January 5, 1874, and their only child, soon after. Widowed, Seymour returned to her father's home from where she published Life and letters of Louis Moreau Gottschalk (Boston, 1870), rushed into print after Gottschalk's death the year before. The father's loss of property during the American Civil War and his feeble health led her to go to Europe for study to become a vocal teacher.

While abroad, she studied in a Catholic convent and embraced Catholicism. She also studied under the best European teachers. Her rare musical accomplishments won the commendation of Franz Liszt, Arthur Rubinstein, and other masters. In 1878 She held the position of musical instructor and English governess to the young Countness of Attems, the Archdukes and Archduchesses, children of the Archduke of Austria, Archduke Karl Salvator of Austria, and his wife, Princess Marie Immaculate of Naples. It was not long before the Empress conferred on her the title of Lady Alice Seymour. She also corresponded for several journals, the Home Journal of New York, the San Francisco Chronicle, and the St. Paul Pioneer Press of Minnesota.

After the death of her father, she received a sizeable inheritance, and returned to her home in the U.S. After losing her fortune, she moved into a small apartment on Sixth Avenue in Manhattan where she gave piano lessons and developed a platonic relationship with Gottschalk. She also taught music in Philadelphia. In 1884, she brought out her papers on "The Rhinegold Trilogy" (Boston), which had been written in Vienna under the supervision of Franz Liszt and Richard Wagner.

After the death of her grandmother, in 1885, she opened a school of vocal music in Nashville, Tennessee. Her books on the festivals of the church, known as the "Cedar Drove Series," were published in New York in 1886, and became standard. She removed to Louisville, Kentucky, in 1887. In Louisville, Seymour held salons emulating those other women held in France. At the salon, she was referred to as Madam Octavia Hensel.

In the summer of 1888, she married secondly Abraham G. Fonda, a descendant of the New York Fonda family, whose ancestor, Major Jelles Fonda, had purchased the Mohawk Valley and from the Phelps and Gorham estate, where the town of Fonda, New York now stands.

Her novel, Imperia (Buffalo, 1892), was a success.

== Personal life ==
Fonda was prominent among the Daughters of the American Revolution and owned many rare American Revolutionary War relics.

She died at her home, "Fonda Vera", in Louisville, of Bright's disease, May 12, 1897, and is buried in that city's Cave Hill Cemetery. Her effects were auctioned off in a private sale. (Musical Courier 1897)

== Selected works ==
- Cedar Grove series

- Whitsuntide at Cedar Grove, 1859
- Christmas holidays at Cedar Grove, 1866
- The Ruthvens of Cedar Grove; or, The Whitsuntide holidays, 1882
- Easter holidays at Cedar Grove, 1884

- The Holly Cross, 1863
- Life and letters of Louis Moreau Gottschalk, 1870
- The Rheingold trilogy; a guide through the trilogy of Richard Wagner, 1884
- Imperia; a story from the court of Austria, 1892
- Music in Kentucky, 1894
- The cross in tradition, history, and art, 1897
