= Eaton Stannard Barrett =

Irish writer

Eaton Stannard Barrett (1786 – 20 March 1820) was an Irish poet and author of political satires. He also wrote a comic novel The Heroine (1813).

== Career ==
Born in County Cork, son of Richard Barrett, gentleman (his mother's identity unknown, but conjectured to be Eleanor Stannard), Barrett attended Trinity College, Dublin, and studied law at Middle Temple, London, although he was never called to the bar. His poems, satirising Whig politics in general and Lord Grenville's special ministry in particular, went through numerous editions.

Barrett's comic gothic novel The Heroine, published in 1813, was an instant success. Further editions quickly followed in 1814 and 1815. Among those who praised the novel at the time was Jane Austen, who declared herself "very much amused by it" and called it "a delightful burlesque". The Critical Review described it as "a very spirited and laughable satire upon the various productions and the name of the novel... which have appeared for the last 18 or 19 years." Another critic praised it as "not inferior in wit and humour to Tristram Shandy, and in point of plot and interest infinitely beyond Don Quixote."

Edgar Allan Poe wrote in 1835: "There are few books written with more tact, spirit, naiveté, or grace... and none more fairly entitled to rank among the classics of English literature than the Heroine of Eaton Stannard Barrett." It was regularly read and reprinted until the early 20th century. After being neglected and out of print for almost a century, it was reissued by Valancourt Books in 2011.

Despite this literary success, little is known of Barrett's life. He appears to have died of tuberculosis in 1820, and yet he is mentioned as an author in a publication called The American Farmer, printed in Baltimore and dated 1823. Given his reported financial difficulties, it is possible, though unproven, that he fled to America to escape his debtors. His death was recorded in The Ladies' Monthly Museum, as having taken place in Glamorgan. The author of a memorial commented: "There are few gentlemen whose private worth gained more esteem, or whose manners possessed more attractions."

In Young Ireland: A Fragment of Irish History, 1840–1845. Final Revision, Charles Gavin Duffy claims that one of Daniel O'Connell's close allies during the Repeal movement – and his least reputable associate – was Eaton Stannard Barrett's brother Richard Barrett. Duffy writes that both Richard and Eaton were "Tory newspapermen" and that Richard converted to Repeal and consequently published Dublin's Repeal newspaper The Pilot.

== List of works ==
- The Rising Sun: A Serio-Comic Satiric Romance by Cervantes Hogg (1807)
- The Second Titan War Against Heaven (1807)
- All the Talents: A satirical poem in three dialogues (1807)
- "Woman" and other poems (1810)
- The Metropolis; or, a Cure for Gaming (published with Minerva Press under a pseudonym in 1811)
- The Heroine, or: Adventures of a Fair Romance Reader (1813)
- My Wife, What Wife? (1815)

== Archives ==
Manuscript poetry of Eaton Stannard Barrett (c.1809) is held at the Cadbury Research Library, University of Birmingham.
