= The Heroine (novel) =

1813 novel by Eaton Stannard Barrett

- Title page for The Heroine; Or Adventures of a Fair Romance Reader (1813)
- Author: Eaton Stannard Barrett
- Publication date: 1813

The Heroine; Or Adventures of a Fair Romance Reader is a novel by Eaton Stannard Barrett, first published in 1813.

The novel is a quixotic satire, in which the protagonist displays the hallmarks of "heroinism" exemplified by Germaine de Staël's novel Corinne ou l'Italie (1807) and goes through a series of Gothic adventures inspired by Ann Radcliffe's novels. Ultimately, the protagonist is reformed, and the novel presents a conservative message that women must be domestic and submissive to men in order to maintain public order.

== Plot ==
Cherry Wilkinson, a fatuous female protagonist with a history of novel-reading, fancies herself as the heroine of a Gothic romance. She perceives and models reality according to the stereotypes and typical plot structures of the Gothic novel, leading to a series of absurd events culminating in catastrophe. After her downfall, her affectations and excessive imaginations become eventually subdued by the voice of reason in the form of Stuart, a paternal figure, under whose guidance the protagonist receives a sound education and correction of her misguided taste.

== Reception ==
The book was a popular bestseller when first published. In 1816, the Biographical Dictionary of the Living Authors of Great Britain and Ireland compared it favourably to famous classics, describing it as "not inferior in wit and humour to Tristram Shandy, and in point of plot and interest infinitely beyond Don Quixote." Jane Austen, who had written her own Gothic parody, Northanger Abbey, in 1803, also praised The Heroine in a letter.

In the twentieth century, however, parodies garnered less respect as literature, and The Heroine went out of print after 1927. It returned to print in 2011 with an edition published by Valancourt Books, which specializes in "the rediscovery of rare, neglected, and out-of-print fiction".
