= Doctor Wortle's School =

1881 novel by Anthony Trollope

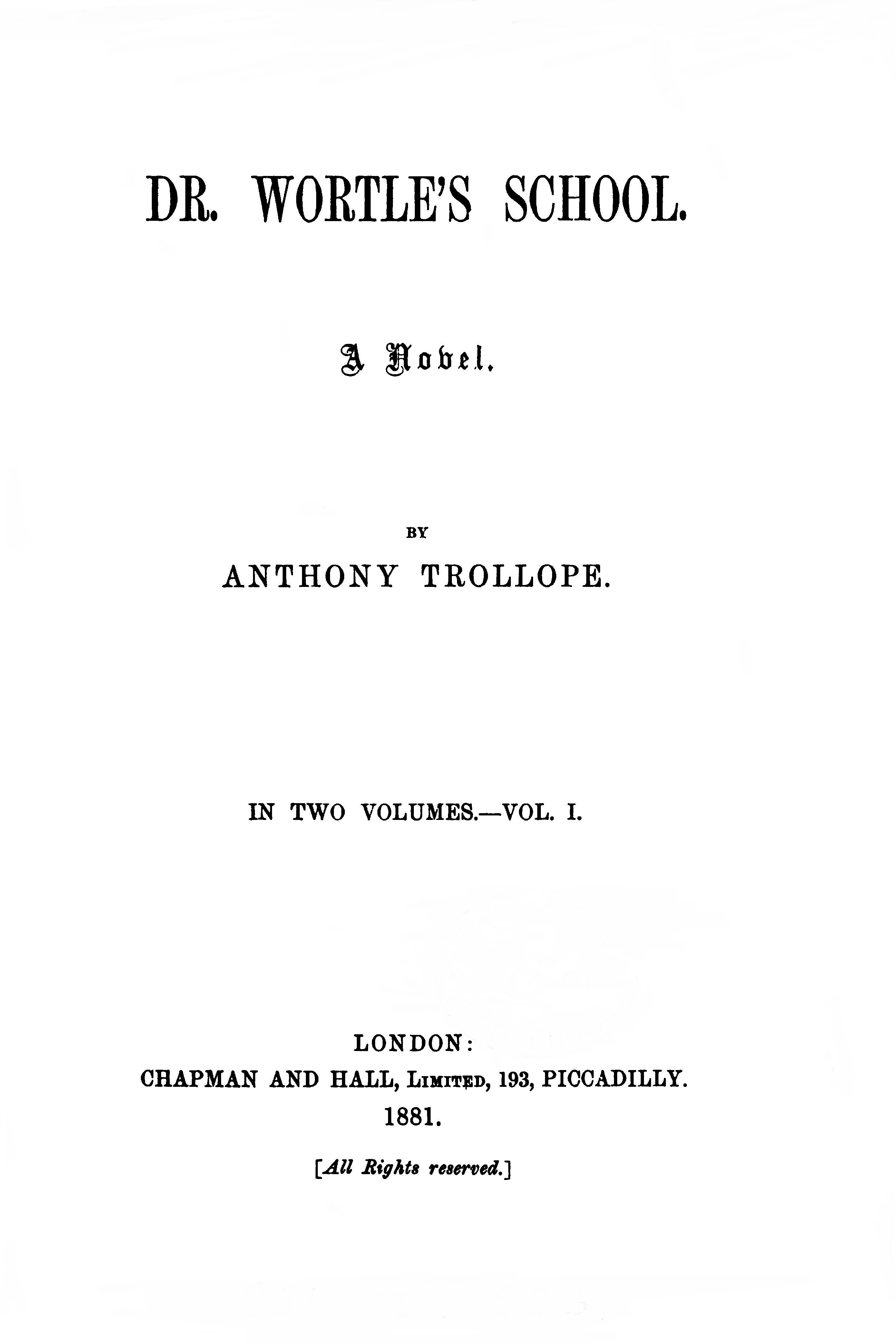
First edition title page.

Doctor Wortle's School, alternatively Dr. Wortle's School or Dr Wortle's School, published in 1881, is a novel by Anthony Trollope, his fortieth book.

== Plot summary ==
The novel takes place in the respectable fictional parish of Bowick, Victorian England, with the main plot concerning itself with the renowned Dr. Wortle's Christian seminary academy. The community's morals are outraged and the school's credibility wounded upon the discovery that Mr. and Mrs. Peacocke, a respectable English scholar and an American woman, hired to the academy by Wortle, are improperly married. Their wedlock was rendered asunder by their chance meeting, some years prior, of Mrs. Peacocke's first husband, an abusive drunkard named Colonel Ferdinand Lefroy. Hearing that a Colonel Lefroy was killed during the Civil War, the two believed it was Ferdinand, because Ferdinand's brother told them so, and they married. Their persistence in living as husband and wife, even after the shocking revelation that Ferdinand is actually alive, creates a scandal. Wortle, though religious, sympathises with the Peacockes and is understanding of their love for each other and hatred for Colonel Lefroy.

The book contains multiple stories: that of Wortle's attempt to rebuild his reputation, provide rebuttal for malicious slander and all the while insist he was right in hiring the Peacockes; Mr. Peacocke's journey to America in search of Ferdinand's true status; the sexual concerns of the Wortles' daughter Mary and the insights of the community members who see the intentional bigamy as a sin.
