= Hermann Schultz =

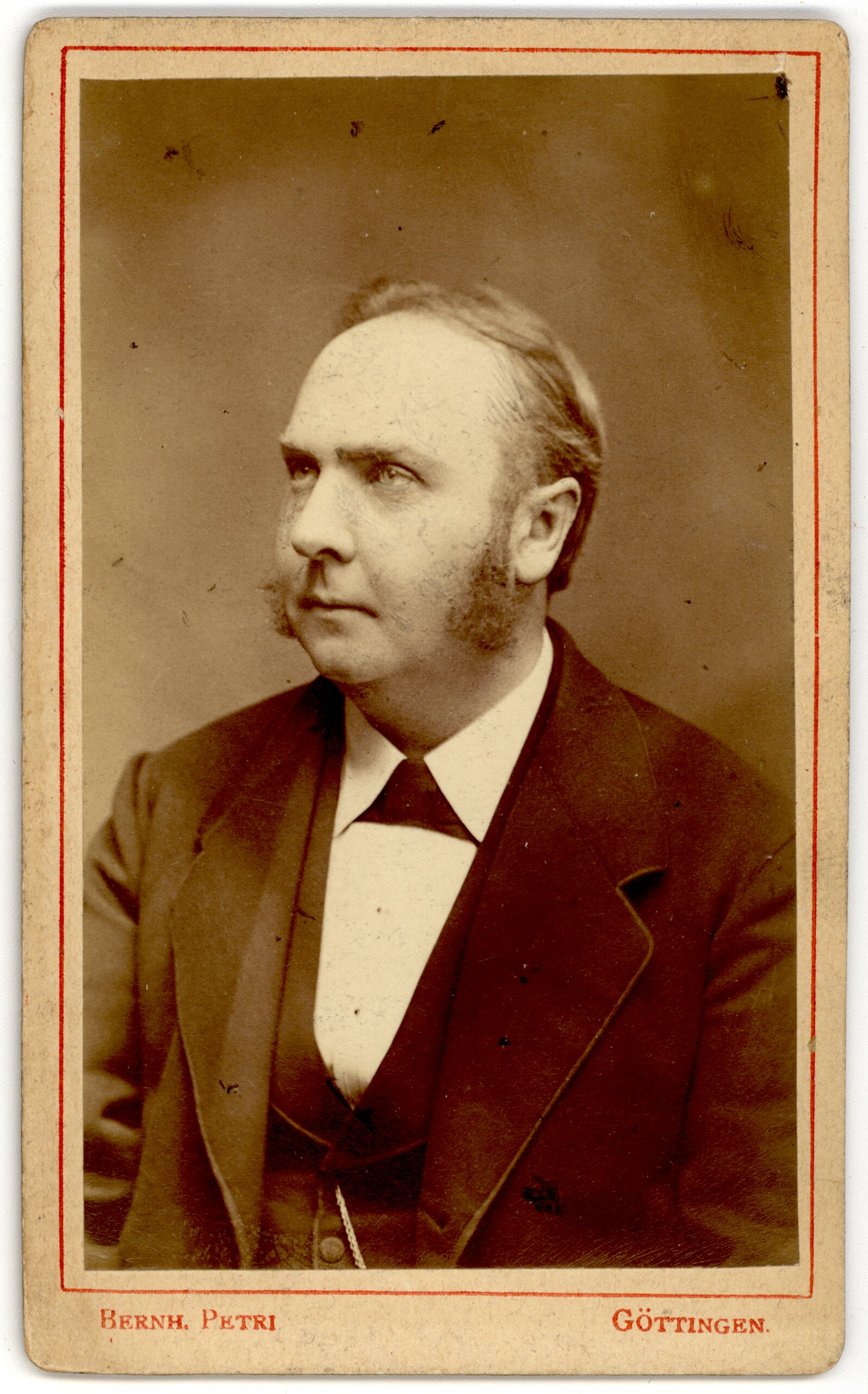
Hermann Schultz, c. 1865-1875

Hermann Schultz (December 30, 1836 - May 15, 1903), German Protestant theologian, was born at Lüchow in Hanover (now in Lower Saxony).

== Education ==
He studied at Göttingen and Erlangen, became professor at Basel in 1864, and eventually (1876) professor ordinarius at Göttingen. Here he also held the appointments of chief university preacher, councillor to the State Consistory of the Church of Hanover (from 1881) and abbot of Bursfelde (1890).

== Religious position ==
Professor Schultz's theological standpoint was that of a moderate liberal. "It is thought by many that he has succeeded in discovering the via media between the positions of Biblical scholars like Delitzsch on the one hand and Stade on the other" (Prof. J. A. Paterson). He was well known to British and American students as the author of an excellent work on Old Testament Theology (2 vols., 1869, 5th ed., 1896; Eng. trans., 2nd ed., 1895).

== Divinity of Christ ==
In his work on the doctrine of the Divinity of Christ (Die Lehre von der Gottheit Christi, 1881) he followed the method of Ritschl, and contended that the deity of Christ ought to be understood as the expression of the experience of the Christian community. In his own person and work Christ represents to the community a personal revelation of God. Faith in the divinity of Christ does not rest upon a miracle in nature, but upon a miracle in the moral world.

== Schultz's other works ==
- Die Stellung des christlichen Glaubens zur heiligen Schrift (1876; 2nd ed., 1877).
- Die Lehre vom heiligen Abendmahl (1886).
- Grundriss der evangelischen Dogmatik (1890; 2nd ed., 1892).
- Grundriss der evangelischen Ethik (2nd ed., 1897).
- Grundriss der christlichen Apologetik (2nd ed., 1902).
