= Stanley Brereton =

1881 novel

- Author: William Harrison Ainsworth
- Language: English
- Genre: Social drama
- Publisher: Routledge
- Publication date: 1881
- Publication place: United Kingdom
- Media type: Print

Stanley Brereton is an 1881 novel by the British writer William Harrison Ainsworth. His final novel before his death the following year, it was published in three volumes by the publishing house Routledge. The novel was initially serialised in the The Bolton Weekly Journal in the author's Lancashire heartland. The same year he was also honoured with a banquet held at Manchester Town Hall, an account of which he included in the book edition of the novel. The novel uses a contemporary setting rather than the historical novels he was best known for.

== Bibliography ==
- Carver, Stephen James. The Life and Works of the Lancashire Novelist William Harrison Ainsworth, 1850-1882. Edwin Mellen Press, 2003.
- Law, Graham. Serializing Fiction in the Victorian Press. Palgrave Macmillan, 2000.
- Worth, George John. William Harrison Ainsworth. Twayne Publishers, 1972.
