= Emily S. Bouton =

American journalist

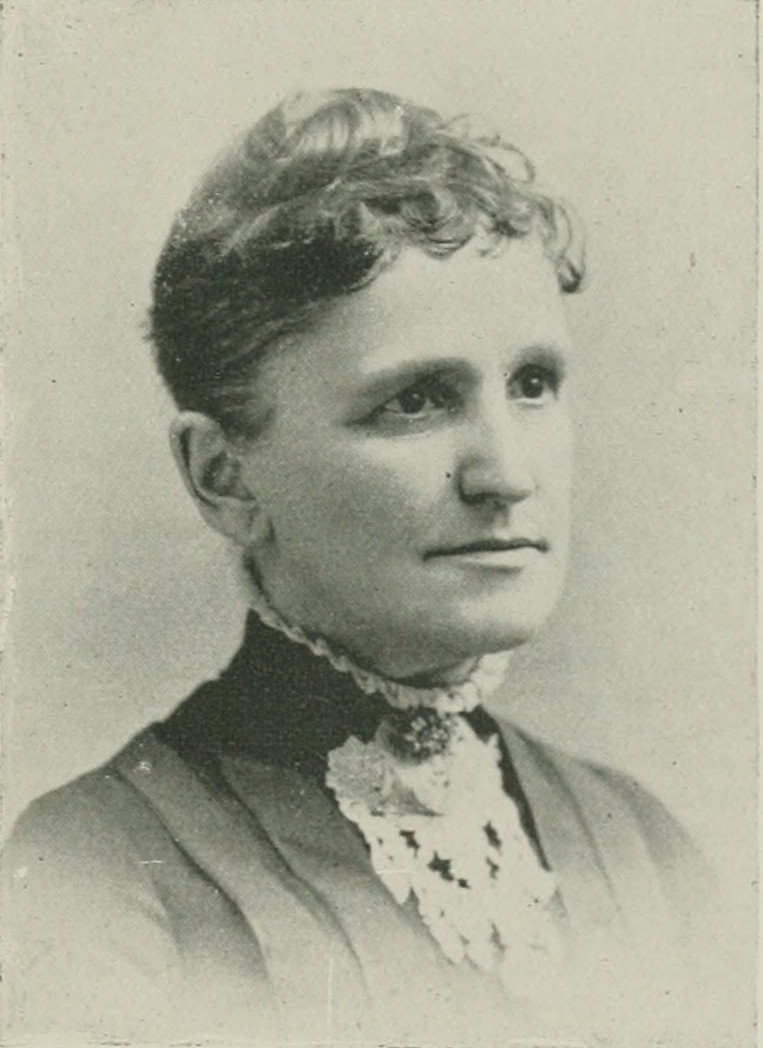
- Photo in A Woman of the Century
- Born: Emily St. John Bouton; February 13, 1837; New Canaan, Connecticut, U.S.
- Died: February 9, 1927 (aged 89); Toledo, Ohio, U.S.
- Occupations: Educator, journalist, author, and editor
- Writing career
- Language: English

Emily S. Bouton (February 13, 1837 – February 9, 1927) was an American educator, journalist, author and editor. She was educated to become a teacher and took the highest position awarded to any woman as teacher in high school at Toledo, Ohio and Chicago, Illinois, but resigned them to engage on journalistic work on the Toledo Blade, position which she held for many years. She also wrote works on health and beauty for women and one on etiquette, beside pamphlets. She published books, wrote for the newspaper press and served as editor of the "Household", the "Saturday Salad" and the "Home Talk" columns of the Toledo Daily Blade. She was the author of Social Etiquette, Health and Beauty and other works more or less directly relating to women.

== Early life and education ==
Emily St. John Bouton was born in New Canaan, Connecticut, February 13, 1837 (or February 15, 1837). Her parents were Daniel Webb and Almina (St. John) Bouton. On her father's side, she traced her ancestry to one of the partisans of William the Conqueror, who was knighted for saving the king when in danger. The family bore a prominent part in the American Revolution among the Connecticut patriots. Her father moved to the West when she was yet a child.

She was educated at Binghamton, New York, and graduated at sixteen in the Sandusky High School as valedictorian in 1857, having previously taught a primary school in Sandusky, Ohio, when only fourteen years of age.

== Career ==
After graduating, she became assistant high-school teacher in Milan, Ohio, then in Tiffin, Ohio, and then, for several years, she filled the same position in the Toledo High School. She occupied the chair of English literature in the Chicago central high school for two years, but relinquished her work on account of failing health, going to California for rest and recuperation.

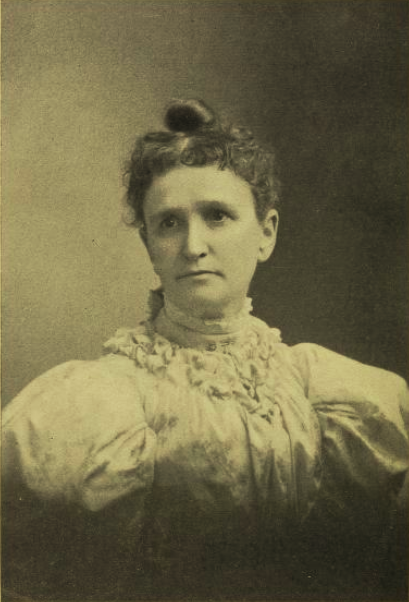
Photo in Life's gateways, 1896

In 1877, she returned to Toledo and became a member of the editorial staff of the Toledo Blade. To many American households, she was endeared as the "household editor" of the paper. She was also a literary critic, and an "all round" newspaper worker. She did much regular editorial writing in political campaigns in the columns of the paper with which she was connected. Her leaders on political topics were marked by direct and close reasoning, her diction was clear, and her logic was convincing. In her later years, she was not called on so frequently to do that kind of writing, leaving her time free for the, to her, more congenial fields of purely literary work and the management of her own department of the paper. Her literary style was so clear and pleasing that it seemed to convey an idea of her personality to her readers. She wrote several successful books on topics pertaining to the home circle. Besides her work upon the Toledo Blade, she wrote stories, letters and essays for other papers and magazines. Bouton's family circle consisted of her mother, her widowed sister and two nephews. She was the author of Health and Beauty, Social Etiquette, Life's Gateways, and The Life Joyful.

Her special field was in work for women. She was a believer in equal rights for women, and her labors were directed to the advancement of woman's sphere through the personal advancement of every women. Bouton worked in societies advocating religious freedom. She was one of the founders and supporters of the Industrial Home for Working Girls, Toledo. She lectured upon literary subjects and their influence upon great movements for humanity's good. Bouton was a member of the executive board of Toledo Suffrage Society. She was a member of the Toledo Woman's Association, Ohio Newspaper Association, honorary member of the Educational Club of Toledo, the Wauseon Woman's Club, Sorosis, and Emerson Class. In 1923, she transitioned to the title of Honorary President of the Writer's Club of Toledo after ten years as president.

== Death ==
Emily Bouton died in Toledo on February 9, 1927.

== Selected works ==
- Fancy work and house decoration : containing descriptions of articles for gifts and for home adornment with a list of prices of all materials used, 1883
- Health and beauty; a book to help women in every day life, 1884
- Social etiquette : the usages of good society, 1894
- Life's gateways : or, How to win real success, 1896
- The Life Joyful, 1910
