= Jane Scott (theatre manager) =

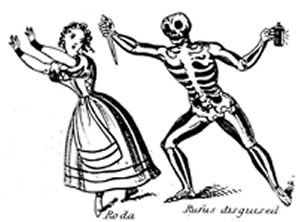
- Sketch of a scene from Jane Scott's 1816 melodrama, The Old Oak Chest
- Born: bap. 1779
- Died: 6 December 1839; Walton-on-Thames, Surrey
- Resting place: St Mary with St John, Upper Edmonton
- Occupations: theatre manager; performer; dramatist
- Spouse: John Davies Middleton (1790–1867)
- Relatives: John Scott (father; 1752–1838); Elizabeth Scott (mother; 1750–1829)
- Writing career
- Language: English
- Years active: 1806—1819
- Notable work: The Old Oak Chest (1816)

Jane Marie Scott (1779–1839) was a British theatre manager, performer, and playwright.

Scott, a singing instructor, and her father, manufacturer John Scott, established the Sans Pareil Theatre (after 1819 renamed the Adelphi Theatre) in London. He built the theatre and she wrote the speeches, songs, and other entertainments which were performed at the opening on 17 November 1806. Jane Scott offered solo entertainments of her own musical compositions. She and her father gathered a theatrical company and by 1809 the theatre was licensed for musical entertainments, pantomime, and burletta. Scott wrote more than fifty stage pieces in an array of genres: melodramas, pantomimes, farces, comic operettas, historical dramas, and adaptations, as well as translations. Given the ephemeral nature of much of this work, however, most of it has not survived: Jane Scott worked in what one critic has called "the illegitimate sphere beyond the reach of print culture."

The Sans Pareil was significant in the move towards "free" theatre and away from the monopolies that dominated licensed theatre at the time. Jacky Bratton credits Scott's role in London theatre: "She had her finger on the pulse of a new world of entertainment for all, and her management of the theatre she created is important for its responsive and intelligent reading of the new audiences and the provision of exciting work for them to enjoy."

Scott retired in 1819 and married John Davies Middleton (1790–1867). She lived in Surrey until her death, in 1839, aged 59 or 60, from breast cancer.

== Partial bibliography ==
- Mary the Maid of the Inn (1809)
- Disappointments (1810)
- The Animated Effigy (1811)
- The Lowland Romp (1811)
- Asgard the Demon Hunter (1812)
- The Forest Knight (1813)
- Whackham and Windham (1814)
- The Gipsy Girl (1815)
- The Conjuror (translated from the French, 1815)
- The Dinner of Madelon (1816)
- The Old Oak Chest (1816)
- Camilla the Amazon (1817)
- The Row of Ballynavogue (adaptations from the fiction of Maria Edgeworth; 1817)
- Fairy Legends (1818)
- The Fortunate Youth (1818)
- The Fire Goblin (adaptations from the fiction of Walter Scott; 1819)

== Resources ==
- The Adelphi Theatre: The 1806–1807 Season
- Bratton, Jacky. "Scott, Jane Margaret (bap. 1779, d. 1839)." Oxford Dictionary of National Biography. Ed. H. C. G. Matthew and Brian Harrison. Oxford: OUP, 2004. 30 November 2006.
- Burroughs, Catherine, Ed. Women in British Romantic Theatre: Drama, Performance, and Society, 1790-1840. Cambridge UP, 2000.
- Crochunis, Thomas & Michael Eberle-Sinatra (2003) "Putting plays (and more) in cyberspace : an overview of the British women playwrights around 1800 project." European Romantic Review, 14:1 (2003): 117-131, DOI: 10.1080/10509580303680
- Scott, Jane. "The Old Oak Chest" (1816). In Sisters of Gore: Seven Gothic Melodramas by British Women, 1790-1843. Edited by John C. Franceschina (1997; rpt. Routledge, 2014.)
