= Esther Saville Allen =

American author

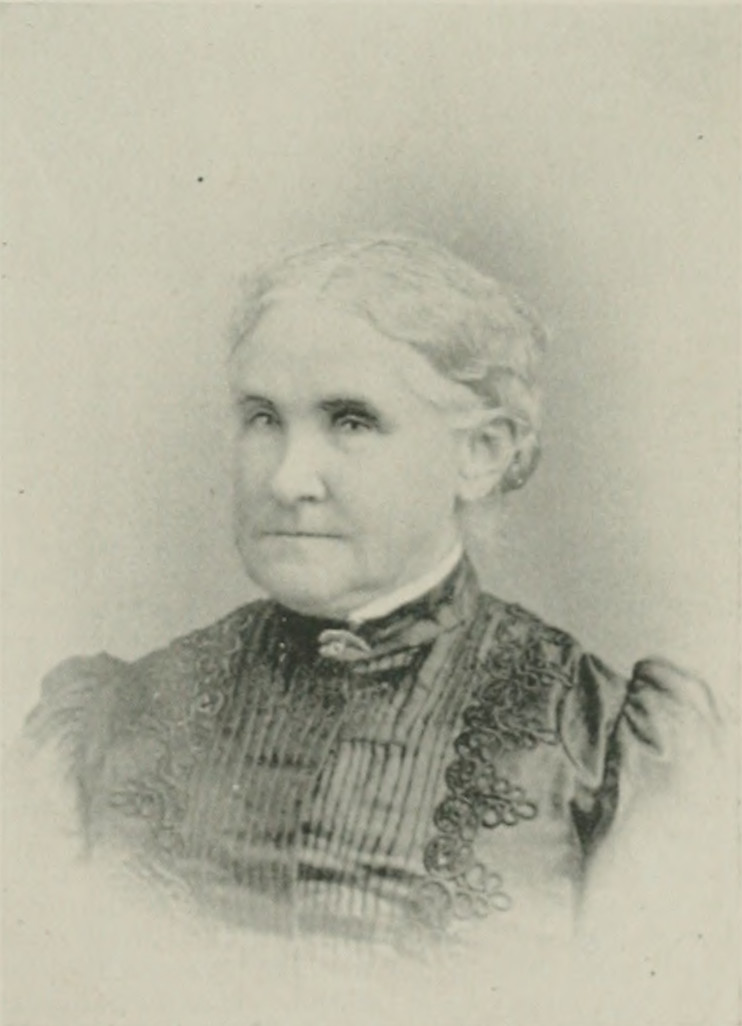
- Photo in A Woman of the Century
- Born: Esther Saville; December 11, 1837; Honeoye, New York, U.S.
- Died: July 16, 1913 (aged 75)
- Resting place: Little Rock National Cemetery, Little Rock, Arkansas, U.S.
- Other name: Etta
- Occupation: author
- Spouse: Samuel R. Allen (m. 1859)
- Writing career
- Pen name: Winnie Woodbine, Etta Saville, Mrs. S. R. Allen

Esther Saville Allen (née, Saville; pen names, Winnie Woodbine, Etta Saville, Mrs. S. R. Allen; December 11, 1837 - July 16, 1913) was an American author from New York. Known as a prolific writer of both prose and verse, she began publishing at the age of ten and later contributed to periodicals and newspapers under various pen names. After moving to Arkansas, she published her works under the name "Mrs. S. R. Allen". She was also a prominent figure in charitable causes, and upon her death, she became the only woman buried in the Little Rock National Cemetery at the time.

== Biography ==
Esther (nickname, "Etta") Saville was born in Honeoye, New York on December 11, 1837. Her parents were Joseph and Esther Redfern Saville, both from England. Her father contributed to British journals of his time. Before Allen was ten years old, she made her first public effort in a poem, which was published. At the age of 12 years, she wrote for Morris and Willis a poem which they published in the "Home Journal." While studying in Western New York and Rushford, New York, she wrote and published many poems under the pen-name, "Winnie Woodbine."

Allen became a teacher in the public schools of western New York and continued to write for eastern papers, assuming her proper name, "Etta Saville." She moved to Illinois in 1857 and she taught in public schools there until she married in 1859. After her marriage to Samuel R. Allen, a lawyer in Erie, Illinois, all her literary works were published under the name of "Mrs. S. R. Allen". In 1872, she removed to Little Rock, Arkansas. Much of her work has been widely copied and recopied. Devoted to charity, organized and practical, her writings in that cause promoted the institution and development of useful work, or revived and reinvigorated it.

She died in Little Rock, Arkansas on July 16, 1913, and was buried next to her husband in the Little Rock National Cemetery. At the time, she was the only woman to be buried in the cemetery.

== Selected works ==
=== Poems ===
- "The Home Coming"
- "Home Again", 1908

=== Short stories ===
- "The French School"
