= Nell Gwynne Tavern =

Pub in Covent Garden, London

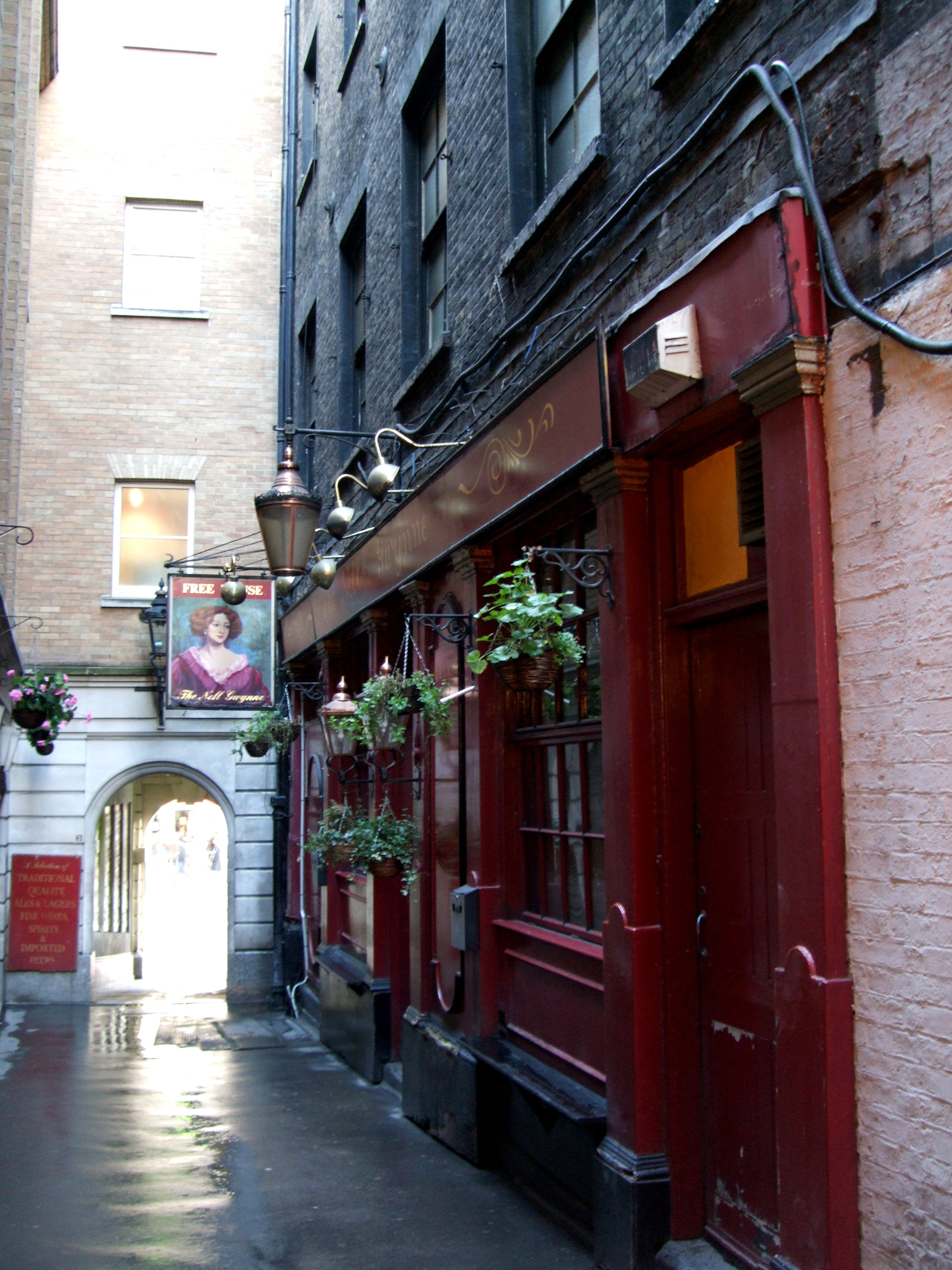
- The Nell Gwynne Tavern
- Type: Public house
- Location: 1–2 Bull Inn Court, Covent Garden, London, WC2
- Coordinates: 51°30′36.84″N 0°7′22.17″W

Listed Building – Grade II
- Official name: NELL GWYNNE TAVERN
- Designated: 15-Jan-1973
- Reference no.: 1066336

The Nell Gwynne Tavern is a Grade II listed public house at 1–2 Bull Inn Court, Covent Garden, London, WC2.

It is an early 19th-century refronting or rebuild of a 17th-century/18th-century house.
