= Jean-Antoine-Marie Monperlier =

Cover of Monperlier's Les chevaliers de Malte, first performed in 1813

Jean-Antoine-Marie Monperlier, (31 June 1788 – 23 March 1819) was a French poet, playwright, and librettist. Monperlier was born in Lyon. His plays ranged from light vaudeville to larger scale melodramas, often incorporating ballet sequences. His play Les chevaliers de Malte formed the basis for Giacomo Meyerbeer's 1824 opera Il crociato in Egitto. He died in Paris, aged 30.

== Works ==
Monperlier's dramatic works include:

- Les femmes infidelles – opéra-vaudeville in 3 acts, first performed 22 September 1812
- Le joueur de flûte, ou Les effets de l'harmonie – opéra comique in 1 act (libretto by Monperlier, music by Jean-Jacques Dreuilh), first performed 5 January 1813
- Les chevaliers de Malte, ou, L'ambassade a Alger – mélodrame in 3 acts, first performed February 1813
- Almanza, ou, La prise de grenade – mélodrame héroïque in 3 acts, first performed 23 July 1814
- Le prince et le soldat – mélodrame in 3 acts, first performed 29 November 1814
- Le panier de cerises – vaudeville anecdotique in 1 act, first performed 17 May 1817

His poetry includes:

- Poèmes et poésies fugitives: voyage au Mont Cindre – published by Chambert, Lyon, 1812
- L'ombre de Henri IV (ode) – published by Chambert, Lyon, 1814
- Le retour des Bourbons – published by Chez les marchands de nouveautés, Paris, 1815

== Sources ==
- Bréghot du Lut, Claude and Péricaud, Marc Antoine, "Monperlier (Jean-Antoine-Marie)", Biographie lyonnaise, Giberton et Brun, 1839, p. 195.
- Le Tellier, Robert Ignatius, The operas of Giacomo Meyerbeer, Fairleigh Dickinson Univ Press, 2006, p. 88. ISBN 0-8386-4093-1
- WorldCat, Jean Antoine Marie Monperlier. Accessed 22 September 2009.
