= Ellen Russell Emerson =

American writer, ethnologist

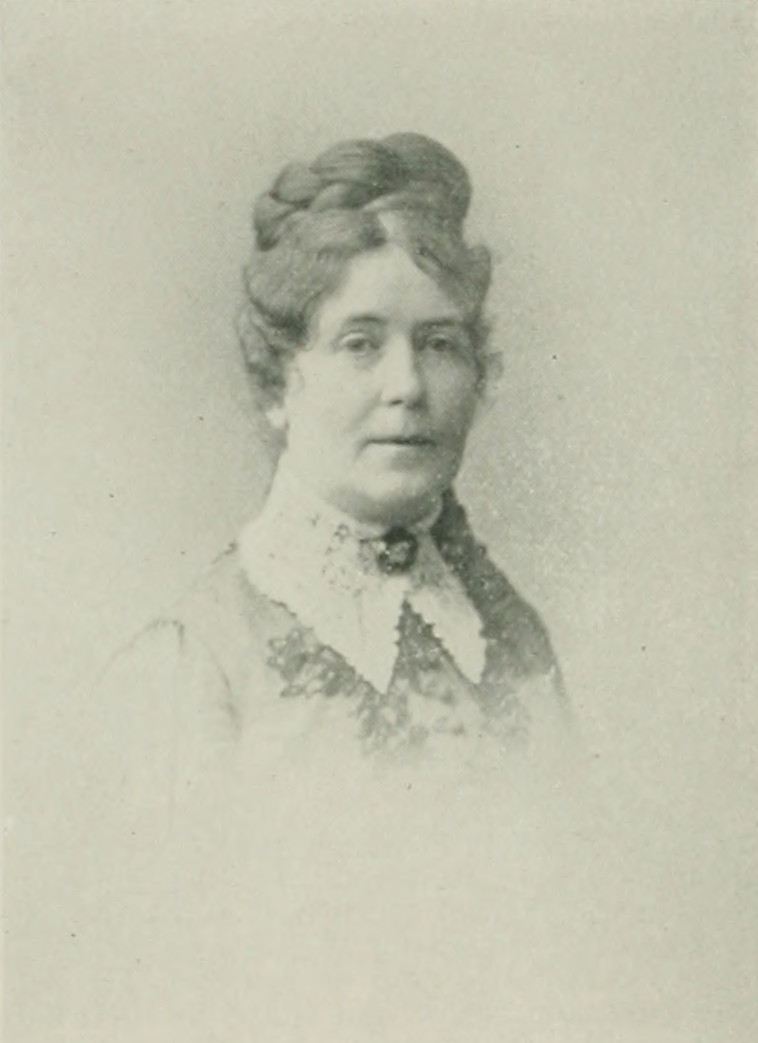
- Photo in A Woman of the Century
- Born: Ellen Russell; January 16, 1837; New Sharon, Maine, U.S.
- Died: June 12, 1907 (aged 70); Cambridge, Massachusetts, U.S.
- Education: Mt. Vernon Seminary
- Occupations: author; ethnologist

Ellen Russell Emerson (née, Russell; January 16, 1837 – June 12, 1907) was a 19th-century American author and ethnologist from Maine. Her notable works include Poems (1865), Indian Myths: Or, Legends, Traditions, and Symbols of the Aborigines of America Compared with Those of Other Countries, Including Hindostan, Egypt, Persia, Assyria, and China (1884), Masks, Heads, and Faces: With Some Considerations Respecting the Rise and Development of Art (1891), and Nature and Human Nature (1892). In 1884, she traveled to Europe, where she conducted research among the records and monuments in the libraries and museums. In Paris, she was elected a member of the Society Americaine de France, the first woman to receive that honor.

== Early life and education ==
Ellen Russell was born in New Sharon, Maine, January 16, 1837. Her father, Dr. Leonard White Russell, was a descendant of the Russells of Charlestown, Massachusetts. Dr. Russell had six children, the youngest of whom, Ellen, was born in the later years of his life. She early gave evidence of peculiarities of temperament, shy, dreamy and meditative, with an exceeding love for nature. Her interest in Indian lore and legend developed after a meeting with Henry Wadsworth Longfellow during her childhood.(McHenry 1980, p. 120)

At 17, she was sent to Boston, where she entered the Mt. Vernon Seminary, in charge of Rev. Dr. Robert W. Cushman, under whose severe and stimulating guidance the student made rapid progress. There her literary work began to appear in fugitive poems and short essays. Her stay in the seminary was brought to an end by a severe attack of brain fever, caused by over study.

== Career ==
In February 1862, she married Edwin R. Emerson,(McHenry 1980, p. 120) then in the government service in Augusta, Maine. Social duties demanded her attention, but gradually she returned to her study, and then began her interest in Indian history. A foundation was laid in systematic research for her book, Indian Myths, or Legends and Traditions of the American Aborigines, Compared with Other Countries. In all her work, she has the cordial interest and sympathy of her husband. Trips to the West, to Colorado and California, brought her in sympathy with Native Americans, whose history and genius she had studied so earnestly. In 1884, she sailed for Europe, where she worked among the records and monuments in the libraries and museums, using not only the note-book, but the sketch-book and brush of the painter as well. Wherever she went, the scholars of Europe recognized her ability and conscientious work, giving her unusual privileges in the pursuit of her researches and showing cordial interest in her labor. In Paris, she was elected a member of the Society Americaine de France, the first woman to receive that honor. There she completed the object of her European visit, and returned to America to prepare for the publication of her work, Masks, Heads and Faces, with Some Considerations Respecting the Rise and Development of Art.

== Critical reviews ==
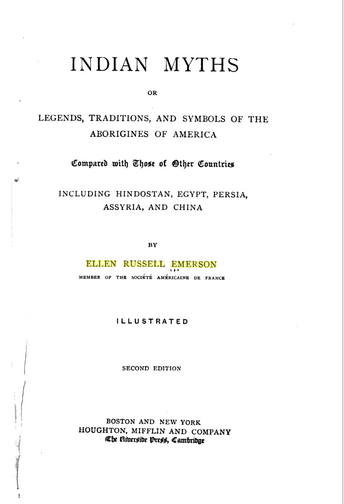
Indian Myths

The Boston Advertiser reviewed Indian myths; or, legends, traditions and symbols of the aborigines of America (James R. Osgood, 1884) and stated that "A large and interesting collection of Indian myths has been made by Ellen Russell Emerson, with the desire of making more evident the capacity of the Indian race for moral and intellectual culture. . . . In support of these views Miss Emerson gives the results of her wide reading on all matters relating to North American Indians, and to the mythology of different countries, showing the family likeness that runs through the legends, traditions and symbols, and is even seen in the languages of the aborigines of America, and the races of the East,—Persians, Assyrians, Hindoos, Chinese and Egyptians. These legends and myths deal with God, with the origin of man and of evil, with all the powers of nature, with forms of worship, and with birds, animals, trees and rocks. They are full of strange and interesting things, and have a great deal of wild fancy and poetic beauty mingled with their childishness. Miss Emerson deals with the capacities and prospects of the red race as a race, not with the wrongs of the separate tribes, or the injustice and inhumanity of the United States Government toward them; but her book is a claim, based on history and ethnology, not on religion or philanthropy, for the full recognition of Indians as belonging to the brotherhood of men, with rights to be respected and powers to be developed." In the 1989 The Journal of American Indian Family Research, it stated that Indian myths was "A valuable study of Indian myths compared with other cultures of the world."

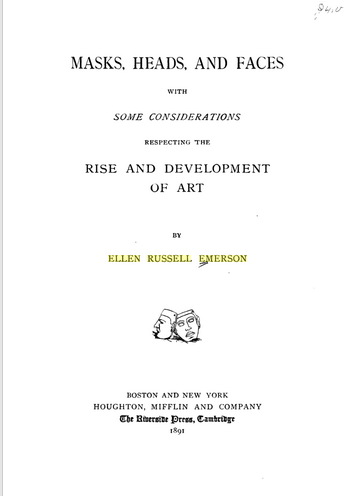
Masks, Heads, and Faces

Masks, Heads, and Faces, With some considerations respecting the Rise and Development of Art (Houghton Mifflin, 1891) was reviewed by McClurg who stated, "Mrs. Emerson's book fills a somewhat unique place in literature, since it explains the earliest incentives to artistic expression. It claims to formulate the alphabet for conventionalized art. It shows the inception of the idea of portraiture, and that the construction of mules originated in emulation of the gods. Ceremonial dances are described – these are the drama of the gods, the earliest masquerade; and there is a chapter on comedy."

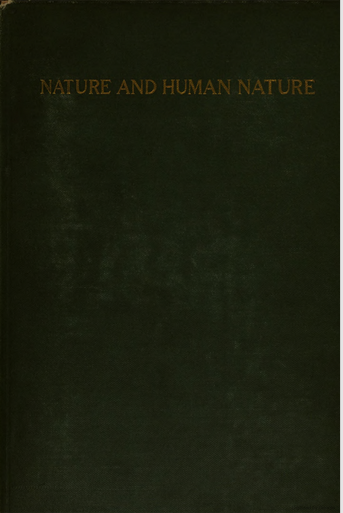
Nature and Human Nature

In Nature and Human Nature (Houghton Mifflin, 1892), "Emerson treats the efforts that men have made to interpret the world through art. She discusses first the ideals in men's minds, then the various forms in which they have sought to embody these, – in music, painting, sculpture, and architecture. A specially interesting interpretation is given of landscape painting and Gothic architecture, with reference to the spiritual qualities which give significance to pictures and buildings. The Dial was less complimentary in its review of Nature and Human Nature stating: A desire to cover too large a field is apparent in Mrs. Ellen Russell Emerson's "Nature and Human Nature" (Houghton). Literature, language, and art, including music, also come in for discussion. In her treatment of art, and symbolism in art, the author shows herself most at home, despite an occasional fanciful idea or far-fetched analogy. Her interpretation of the Laocoön as suggesting, in the serpents' undulating folds, "the gliding stanchless waves of the sea, against whose onward movement there is no barrier," is new to us. Were Poseidon the offended divinity in the case, this reading of the symbol would be more plausible. But the temptation to subtilize on art, as Lessing says in his "Laokoon," sometimes leads one into whimsical theories. As an interpreter of nature, Mrs. Emerson is helpful. Passing to letters, she asserts that when a poet willingly becomes a translator of another's verse, he thereby stands confessed as a minor poet. Hence she refuses to recognize Longfellow and Bryant as great poets. Leaving Pope out of the account, does she forget that Goethe and Schiller and Browning also tried their hand at translating ? Or would she deny greatness to them as well? Evidently not; for she afterwards speaks of Browning in the same breath with Shakespeare, ascribing to both the "balance of heart and brain." that marks the true poet. The writer's thought, it must be said in conclusion, suffers for lack of terseness and incisiveness in its presentation. We choose, almost at random, a sentence that cries out for the pruning-knife, – "Interpretation of the sublimity of an uplift of rock, forest, and tableland is product of a vision dependent on the soul's sight, and sublimity is not more intrinsic to mountainous scenery than is color to a garden of flowers." The Gallicism in the following is so harsh, and so unnecessary, as to merit censure, – "Scientific discovery, indeed, has laid its axe to the root of many errors, and among which the error of self-importance is not the least conspicuous." May linguistic discovery soon lay its axe to the root of this error of speech ! A number of new or little-used words, as "sculptuary" (i.g. sculpture), "bolide," "landscapist," are encountered in Mrs. Emerson's pleasant pages."

== Personal life ==
Emerson usually spent her winters in Boston, and lived a quiet, studious life with her one daughter. She died in Cambridge on June 12, 1907.

== Selected works ==
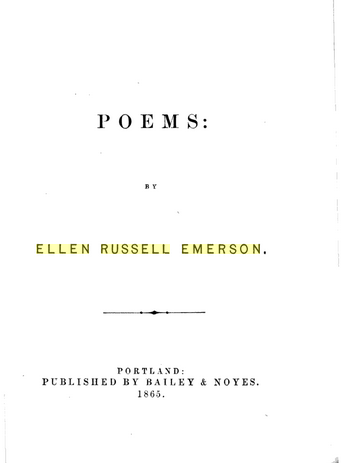
Poems

- 1865, Poems
- 1884, Indian Myths: Or, Legends, Traditions, and Symbols of the Aborigines of America Compared with Those of Other Countries, Including Hindostan, Egypt, Persia, Assyria, and China
- 1891, Masks, Heads, and Faces: With Some Considerations Respecting the Rise and Development of Art
- 1892, Nature and Human Nature
