= Liu Xizai =

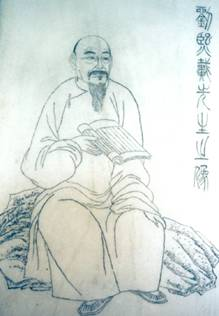
Drawing of Liu Xizai

Liu Xizai (Chinese: 刘熙载; pinyin: Liú Xīzǎi; 1813–1881) was a Chinese literati of the Qing Dynasty. He was regarded as the Hegel of the East (东方黑格尔). In his writings, such as Private Words to Uphold the Will (Chizhi Shuyan) and Reading Notes from Ancient Tung Tree Studio (Gutong Shuwo Zhaji), he explored the concept of the “inner saint,” which harmonizes human nature, artistic creation, and moral virtue. Liu advocated for transcending self and worldly objects while maintaining a balanced emotional state and pursuing high ethical standards.

== Name variations ==
Liu (刘) is the family name, or surname. His given name is Xizai (熙载). His courtesy name was Bójiǎn (伯简). He may also be known by the pseudonym (art name), Róngzhāi (容斋) or Wùyázǐ (寤崖子).

== Life ==
The book, The Record of Xing Hua (兴化市志) remains the primary source of bibliographical material on Liu Xizai. More sources include internal evidence from articles by or about Liu Xizai, and other sources.

In 1813, Liu Xizai was born in Xinghua, Jiangsu. When he was ten years old, his father died. Several years later, his mother also died. The young Xizai read extensively and engaged in studying. He made friends with Woren and many other intelligent peers. In 1864, he served as a teacher in Guozijian and made great contributions. He finished his autobiography when he was very old. In 1881, he died at the age of 69.

== Works ==
Most of his works focus on criticizing literature. They are considered important to the development of Chinese culture.

=== Brief introduction of his major books ===
- Generalization of Art (艺概)
  It consists of six volumes (that is 文概, 诗概, 赋概, 词曲概, 书概, 经义概)
- Collections of Previous Mistakes (昨非集)
- Classification of Four Tunes (四音定切)

== Influence ==
Liu Xizai has had a great influence in China for his correct and outstanding appreciation of quantities of literature books or poem written by many famous people such as Du Fu, Wang Wei, Liu Yuxi and so on. He provided people with different perspectives to comment on traditional Chinese culture.
