= Jean-François Cailhava =

French dramatist, poet and critic (1731–1813)

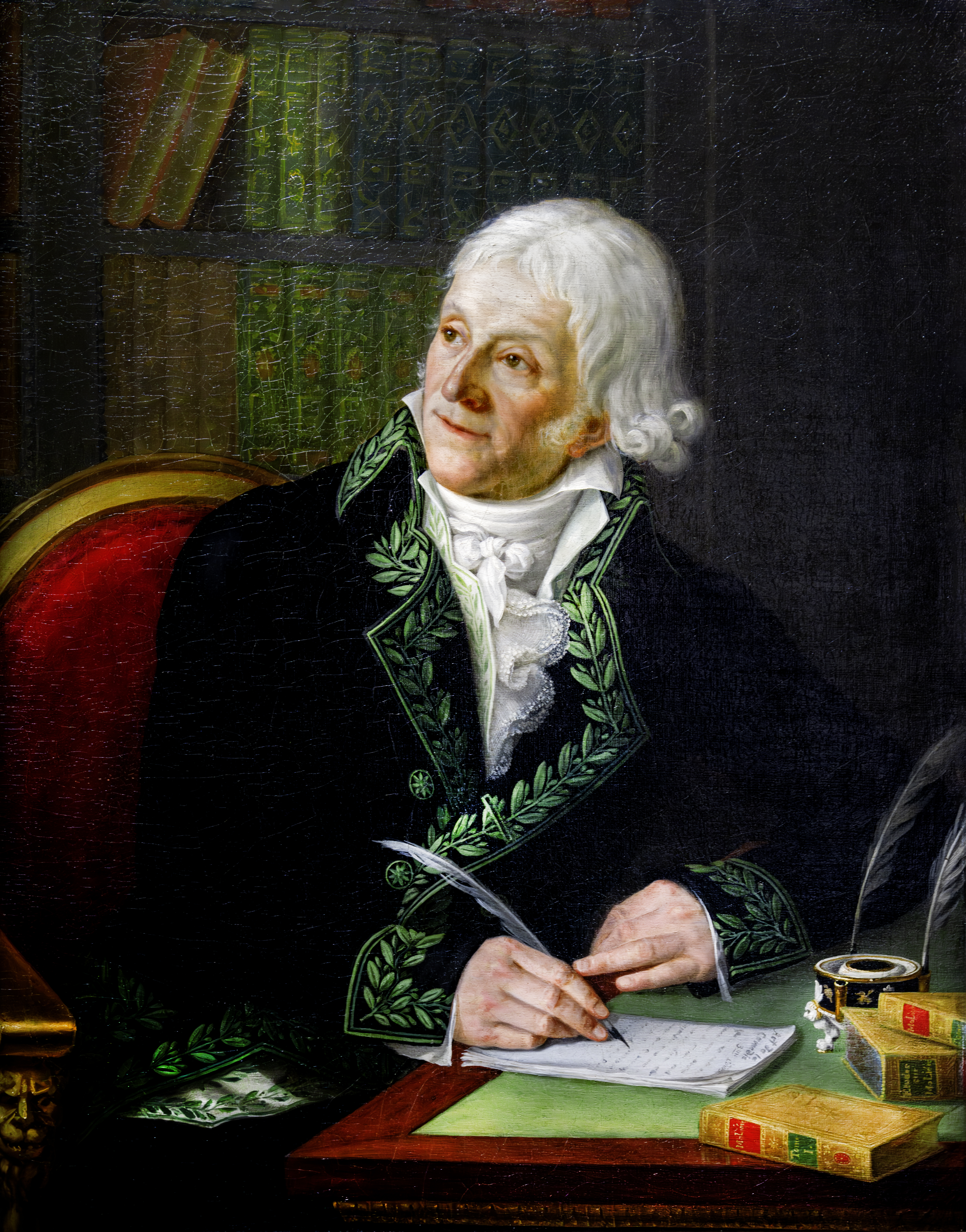
Cailhava de L'Estandoux

Jean-François Cailhava de L'Estandoux or d'Estendoux (28 April 1731 – 26 June 1813) was a French dramatist, poet and critic.

L'Estandoux was born in Estandoux, Toulouse. He was elected the ninth occupant of Académie française seat 29 in 1803. He died, aged 82, in Paris.

== Biography ==
The success of a short play he staged at the theater in Toulouse inspired him to seek a performance at the Comédie-Française. The refusal of actors and the boos from the audience that greeted his early works did not discourage him, and he eventually achieved success. Cailhava's main dramatic attempt was Égoïsme, a five-act comedy in verse, performed in 1777, in which the author tried, without much success, to return to the great traditions of character comedy.

Cailhava had La Harpe against him, who attacked him violently in Mercure de France. But he stood up to the critic and took him to task on stage, in Le Journaliste anglais. The hostility of the famous actor Molé was more dangerous and closed the Comédie-Française to him. He then turned his attention to books on dramatic art, adding a few libertine and insipid writings. He was friends with another libertine writer, Simon-Pierre Mérard de Saint-Just. Admitted to the Institute in 1797, he became a member of the Académie Française when it was reconstituted. It is said that he professed a genuine devotion to Molière and wore a tooth set in a ring, which he claimed came from the famous poet. So wits remarked that he had a grudge against Molière when he restored Le Dépit amoureux to five acts, an undertaking that was not appreciated by the public.

Friedrich Melchior, Baron von Grimm wrote a lengthy analysis of one of his plays, The Deceived Guardian, in which he states: "This play is of the kind known as a plot play. Everything usually revolves around the tricks and ruses of a valet who takes an interest in the marriage of a couple in love, whom he has won over, and who makes it happen despite the opposition of an old guardian. This is neither Terence comedy nor Molière's: it is Italian farce, itself imitated from Plautus comedy, transported to the French theater without masks, and arranged with a little more regularity. Mr. Cailhava d'Estandoux, despite his magnificent name, is far from being able to hold a candle to his rival, the modest and humble Carlo Goldoni .»

== Works ==
Theatre

- Le Tuteur dupé, comédie en 5 actes et en prose, sujet tiré de Plautus, acte deuxième du Soldat fanfaron, Paris, Comédiens français ordinaires du roi, 30 September 1765
- Les Étrennes de l'amour, comédie-ballet en un acte, Paris, Comédiens italiens ordinaires du roi, 1 January 1769
- La Fille supposée, comédie en 3 actes et en vers, Paris, Comédiens français, 10 April 1769
- Le Mariage interrompu, comédie en 3 actes et en vers, Paris, Comédiens français, 20 April 1769
- Le Jeune Présomptueux, ou le Nouveau Débarqué, Paris, Comédiens français, 2 August 1769
- Le Nouveau Marié, ou les Importuns, opéra comique in 1 act, Paris, Comédiens italiens ordinaires du Roi, 20 September 1770
- Arlequin Mahomet ou le cabriolet vivant, drame philosophi-comi-tragique-extravagant en trois actes et en prose, Paris, Comédiens italiens du roi, 1770
- La buona Figliuola, opéra-comique en 3 actes, parodiée en français sur la musique du célèbre Piccini, Paris, Comédiens italiens du roi, 17 June 1771
- L'Égoïsme, comédie en 5 actes, Paris, Comédiens français, 19 June 1777
- Les Journalistes anglois, comedy in 3 acts and in prose (1782)
- Athènes pacifiée, comedy in 3 acts and in prose, from the eleven onze pieces by Aristophanes (1796)
- L'Enlèvement de Ragotin et de Mme Bouvillon ou le Roman comique dénoué, comedy in two acts (1798)
- Les Ménechmes, grecs, comedy in 4 acts, preceded by a prologue, Paris, Théâtre-Français, 1791
- Le Dépit amoureux, rétabli en 5 actes, hommage à Molière (1801)
- Théâtre complet (5 volumes, 1802)

Studies on theatre

- De l'Art de la comédie, ou Détail raisonné des diverses parties de la comédie et de ses différents genres, suivi d'un traité de l'imitation, où l'on compare à leurs originaux les imitations de Molière et celles des modernes, terminé par l'exposition des causes de la décadence du théâtre et des moyens de le faire refleurir (4 volumes, 1771). Réédition : Slatkine, Genève, 1970.
- Études sur Molière, ou Observations sur la vie, les mœurs, les ouvrages de cet auteur, et sur la manière de jouer ses pièces, pour faire suite aux diverses éditions des Œuvres de Molière (1802)
- Réflexions présentées au Comité d'Instruction publique, en réponse aux Mémoires de quelques Directeur des Spectacles de Province, contre les droits des Auteurs dramatiques (S. l. n. d., 4 p.) Texte en ligne : .

Tales

- Le Soupé des petits maitres, ouvrage moral (1770). Réédité sous le titre Les contes en vers et en prose de feu l'abbé de Colibri, ou Le soupé, conte composé de mille et un contes (1797)
