= Florence Caddy =

English author (1837–1923)

- Born: 1837; Middlesex, England
- Died: 1923 aged 86; Devonport, Devon, England
- Other name: Florence Tompson
- Known for: Writer

Florence Caddy (1837 – 9 July 1923) was an English non-fiction writer from Middlesex. She wrote the first book on household management to become well known.

== Family ==
She was born in Middlesex (now part of London) in 1837, as Florence Tompson. She married John Turner Caddy in 1857 at Church of Christ the King, Bloomsbury in London and had five children: John Francis in 1857, Florence in 1863, Arnold in 1866, Hermione Helena in 1869 and Adrian in 1879. Her husband died in 1902 and she died in 1923 in Plymouth.

== Works ==
Caddy's 1877 Household Organisation covers most aspects of housekeeping in its 84 pages.

Her 1886 book on Joan of Arc was described in a review in The Spectator as "eminently readable". However, the reviewer notes that she "does not belong to the sceptical school of historians. Believing Jeanne to have been a divinely inspired heroine, she casts no doubt on the reality of her voices and visions."

== Bibliography ==
- 1877 Household Organisation, Chapman & Hall, London.
- 1878 Artist and Amateur; or, The Surface of Life, 3 vols., Chapman & Hall, London.
- 1881 Lares and Penates; or, The Background of Life, Chatto & Windus, London.
- 1883 Adrian Bright: a Novel, 3 vols., Hurst & Blackett, London.
- 1886 Footsteps of Jeanne d'Arc: a Pilgrimage, Hurst & Blackett, London.
- 1887 Through the Fields with Linnaeus: a Chapter in Swedish History, 2 vols., Longmans, London.
- 1889 To Siam and Malaya in the Duke of Sutherland's Yacht "Sans Peur", Hurst & Blackett, London. Republished by OUP in 1992
