= Questions sur les Miracles =

Series of pamphlets by Voltaire

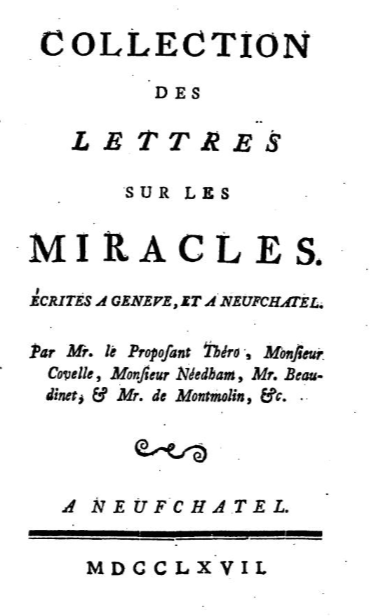
- Author: Voltaire
- Publication date: 1765
- Media type: Pamphlets

Questions sur les Miracles, also known as Lettres sur les Miracles (Questions/Letters on miracles), is a series of pamphlets published by the French philosopher and author Voltaire. In these pamphlets Voltaire expresses many themes, including primarily his arguments against other recent pamphlets that had discussed religious miracles. Voltaire, in his responses found it ridiculous that God would occasionally violate natural laws for a particular reason. Voltaire's first pamphlet was published in July 1765, and during the course of that year, he published nineteen more. The pamphlets were published anonymously, and signed pseudonymously.

== Content ==
Questions sur les Miracles starts with theological questions, but moves on to repeat some of the defences of democracy and free expression that Voltaire had proposed in his earlier Idées républicaines: "Let us uphold the liberty of the press, it is the basis of all other liberties; through it we enlighten each other."

A number of the letters satirically express Voltaire's criticisms of the English biologist John Needham who had promoted the idea of spontaneous generation, of the French philosopher Jean-Jacques Rousseau, and of the authorities at Geneva who had resisted greater democracy. Voltaire uses irony and sarcasm to convey his sceptical opinion on miracles; one letter poses that miracles are authentic and, with exaggerated optimism, hopes that priests will manifest them. "We even hope that not only will these learned men work miracles, but that they will hang all those who do not believe in them. Amen!" Voltaire thought that the miracles of Jesus should be seen as moral lessons rather than real events.

Needham was in Geneva in 1765 when he ran across Voltaire's anonymously written pamphlets, which Voltaire began as responses to Protestant pastor David Claparède's 1765 pamphlet Considérations sur les miracles. Claparède's publication was a reply to Rousseau's 1764 pamphlet Lettres écrites de la Montagne. All these publications considered religious miracles—if they were possible and what they meant.

Voltaire, who had been living at Ferney just outside of Geneva, wrote twenty of these pamphlets by the end of 1765. They attacked Calvinist religious dogmas, discussed religious massacres and martyrdoms, and discussed the local politics of Geneva.

Voltaire said it was ridiculous to think that God would make the sun hold still, thus violating the laws of the physic, just so that Joshua would be able to commit a massacre. The only reason, Volitaire suggested, must have been "so that on this small pile of mud called earth, the Popes might finally seize Rome, the benedictines might become too rich, Anne du Bourg might be hanged in Paris and Servetus be burned alive in Geneva."

Needham began to respond to Voltaire's anonymous pamphlets with three anonymous pamphlets of his own. The identities of each author soon became known and personal attacks ensued.

An often quoted passage from the Questions sur les Miracles regards sacrificing reason and standing up to power:

Once your faith, sir, persuades you to believe what your intelligence declares to be absurd, beware lest you likewise sacrifice your reason in the conduct of your life. In days gone by, there were people who said to us: "You believe in incomprehensible, contradictory and impossible things because we have commanded you to; now then, commit unjust acts because we likewise order you to do so." Nothing could be more convincing. Certainly anyone who has the power to make you believe absurdities has the power to make you commit injustices. ... Once a single faculty of your soul has been tyrannized, all the other faculties will submit to the same fate.

One surviving copy has extensive notes by Voltaire on just the first letter, suggesting that he intended to revise the book into the form of a treatise rather than series of letters, but never completed this.
