= Des singularités de la nature =

1768 book by Voltaire

Des singularités de la nature is a book on natural history by the French philosopher and author Voltaire, first published in 1768. In it, he defends Preformationism, the idea that organisms develop from tiny versions of themselves. He defends the idea of a supreme being, and the idea that many features of the natural world have been made to benefit people, including noses for smelling and mountains for forming the landscape.
