= Annals of the Empire =

History of Germany written by Voltaire

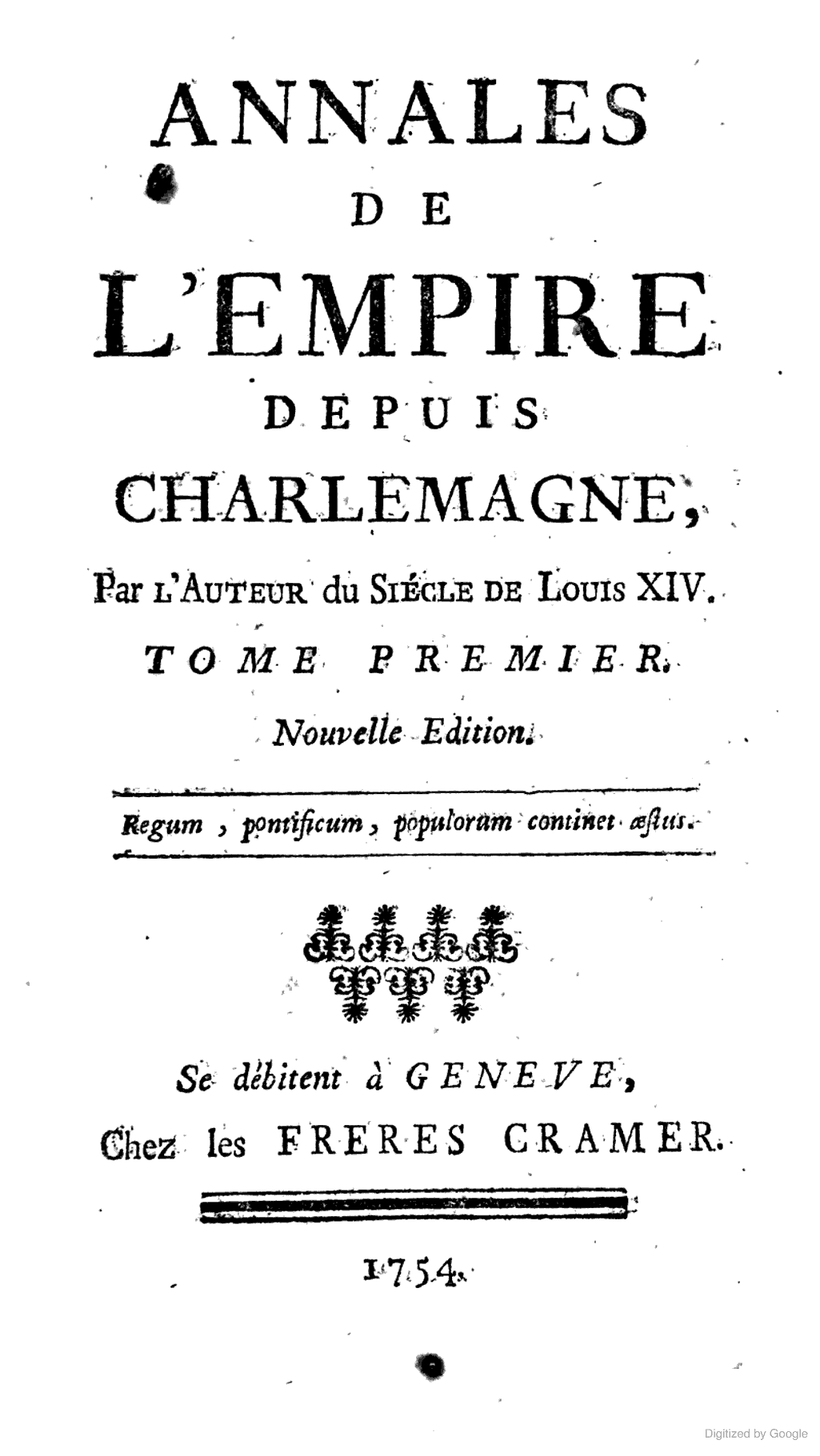

Annals of the Empire (Annales de l’Empire) is a history of Germany written by the French philosopher and author Voltaire at the request of Princess Luise Dorothea of Saxe-Meiningen in 1753. The first volume appeared in December 1753 and the second in March 1754.

It is largely compiled from previous work by German historians: Voltaire described his role as like an architect, assembling a building from individual pieces of masonry.
