= La Femme qui a Raison =

Verse comedy

La Femme qui a Raison (‘The Reasonable Wife’), is a verse comedy in three acts written by Voltaire in 1749. The play was first performed in 1749 at a feast in honour of Stanisław Leszczyński in the castle of Lunéville and first published in 1759.

== Background ==
The play was written just after Voltaire moved from Paris to the court of Lorraine with Émilie du Châtelet. Following his sensitive comedy Nanine, which had been influenced by Samuel Richardson, the focus was on the contrast between love marriages and the more usual money marriages of the middle class. A one-act version of the piece was found in Voltaire's literary estate after his death, which corresponds closely to the published three-act version. Voltaire revised the play for the Geneva edition which was published in 1775 by Cramer and Bardin.

== Action ==
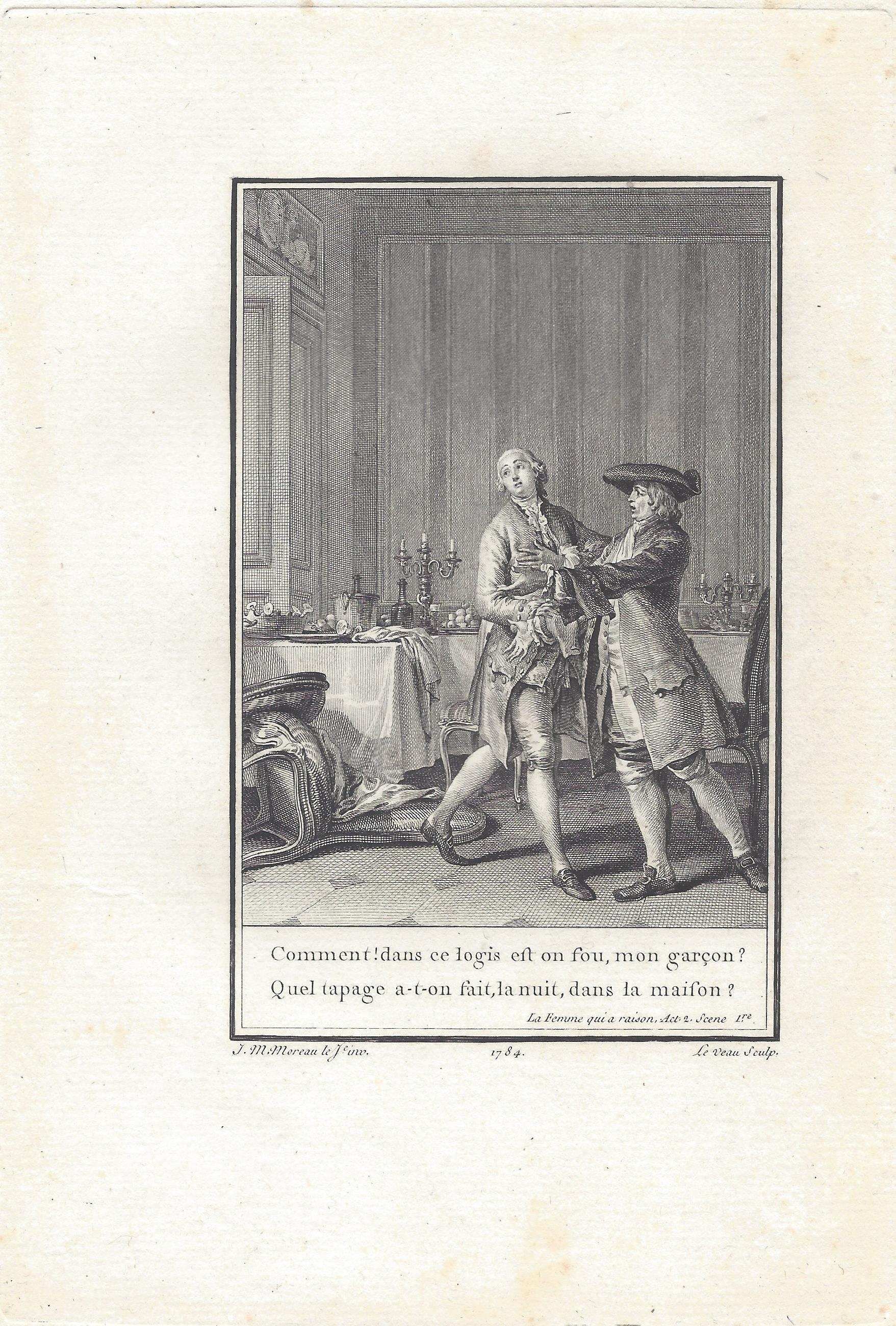
Jean-Michel Moreau: Illustration of Femme qui a raison, 1784

The action takes place in Paris in the house of Madame Duru in Rue Thévenot. The Marquis d'Outremont, to the delight of Madame Duru, asks for the hand of her daughter Erise and agrees to a wedding of his sister with Erise's brother Damis. However her husband M. Duru has been living in India for twelve years and has already planned a marriage between Erise and Damis with the children of wealthy mill owner M. Gripon. Gripon arrives with a letter from the father, saying that this wedding has to happen soon. Madame Duru does not care about her husband's wishes and organizes the wedding of the lovers the same evening. The following day, M. Gripon announces the imminent return of Madame Duru's husband. Duru himself has already arrived under an assumed name as a supposed friend of the landlord and can not cope in the general chaos. When he finally grasps the situation, he has an outburst of rage. His wife explains her sentimental reasons for disobeying. Finally, the servant Marthe reconciles the angry couple.

== Contemporary reception ==
The comedy premiered in 1749 in the castle of Lunéville as an intermezzo during a festival in honor of Stanislaus I Leszczyński. According to Fréron, who relied on eyewitnesses, the performance was only received lukewarmly. The comedy was performed in Dijon, La Rochelle, Bordeaux and Marseille after this, but never brought to Paris. In 1758 there was a new production in the fr:Théâtre de Carrouge in Geneva. The printed edition, published in 1759, was discussed and thoroughly critiqued by Fréron in volumes III and IV of the literary journal L'Année littéraire published by him. The marked the beginning of a furious quarrel between Voltaire and Fréron, which included a retaliation by Voltaire parodying his opponent in the character Fléron' in his 1760 comedy fr:Le Café ou l'Écossaise.

== Printed editions ==
Some sources indicate that the first edition was printed by fr:Gabriel Cramer and the second by Lambert. In fact this is incorrect; the first edition is by Lambert and the second is simply an unauthorised provincial copy. Cramer never printed a separate edition of La Femme Qui a Raison, and it is only a misunderstanding of sources that suggests otherwise.

- La Femme qui a raison, comédie en trois actes, en vers. Par M. de Voltaire. Donnée sur le Théâtre de Caronge (sic!), Près Genève, en 1758, Geneva, (Lambert), 1759, 8 °, 71 pp (online)
- La Femme qui a raison, comédie en trois actes, en vers. Par M. de Voltaire. Donnée sur le Théâtre de Caronge (sic!), Près Genève, en 1758, Geneva, (unknown printer), 1759, 12 °, 48pp
- La Femme qui a raison, comédie en trois actes, en vers. Par M. de Voltaire. Donnée sur le Théâtre de Carouge, près Genève, en 1758, Amsterdam, Ledet, 1760, 8 °, 80pp
- La Femme qui a raison, comédie en trois actes, en vers. Par M. de Voltaire. Donnée sur le Théâtre de Caronge (sic!), Près Genève, en 1758, Geneva, (unknown printer), 1760, 8 °, 71pp
- La Femme qui a raison, comédie en trois actes, en vers. Par M. de Voltaire. Donnée sur le Théâtre de Caronge (sic!), Près Genève, en 1758. Nouvelle Edition, Geneva, (unknown printer), 1760, 8 °, 44pp
