= Voltaire =

French writer and philosopher (1694–1778)

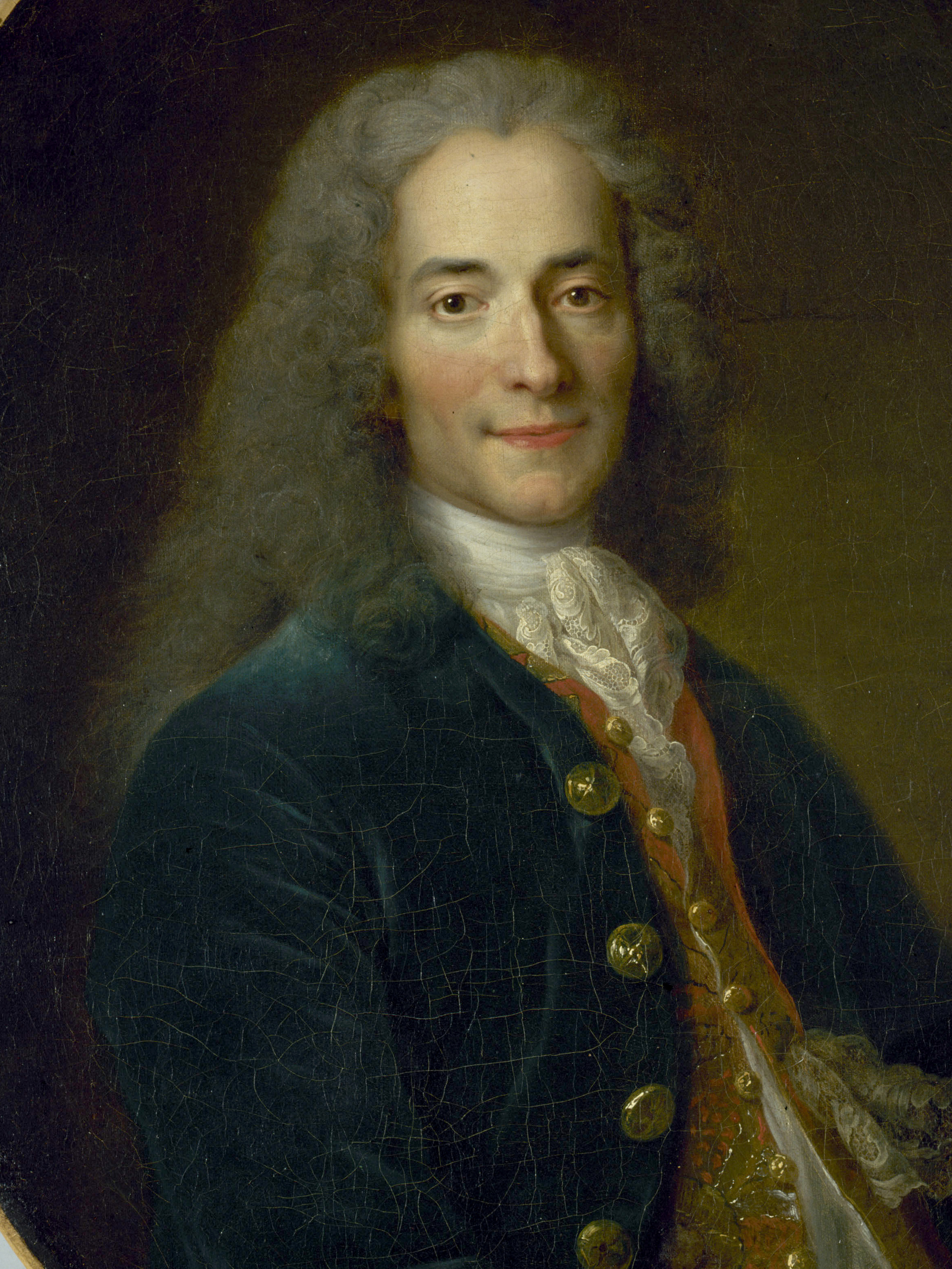
- Portrait by Nicolas de Largillière, c. 1720s
- Born: François-Marie Arouet; 21 November 1694; Paris, France
- Died: 30 May 1778 (aged 83); Paris, France
- Resting place: Panthéon, Paris
- Education: Collège Louis-le-Grand
- Occupations: Writer, philosopher, historian
- Partner(s): Émilie du Châtelet (1733–1749); Marie Louise Mignot (1744–1778)
- Writing career
- Years active: From 1715
- Genres: Fiction (novella; short story; tragedy; poetry); Non-fiction (polemic; treatise; essay; article; historiography; literary criticism; epistle; correspondence)
- Subjects: Religious intolerance, freedom
- Notable works: Candide; The Maid of Orleans; The Age of Louis XIV
- Movement: Classicism

Philosophical work
- Era: Age of Enlightenment
- Region: Western philosophy French philosophy
- School: Lumières; Philosophes; Deism; Classical liberalism
- Main interests: Political philosophy, literature, historiography, biblical criticism
- Notable ideas: Philosophy of history, freedom of religion, freedom of speech, separation of church and state

François-Marie Arouet (French: [fʁɑ̃swa maʁi aʁwɛ]; 21 November 1694 – 30 May 1778), known by his pen name Voltaire (/vɒlˈtɛər, voʊl-/, US also /vɔːl-/; French: [vɔltɛːʁ]), was a French Enlightenment writer, philosopher (philosophe), satirist, and historian. Famous for his wit and his Criticisms of the Catholic Church and slavery, Voltaire was an advocate of freedom of speech, freedom of religion, and separation of church and state.

Voltaire produced works in almost every literary form, including plays, poems, novels, essays, histories, and scientific expositions. He wrote more than 20,000 letters and 2,000 books and pamphlets. Voltaire was one of the first authors to become renowned and commercially successful internationally. He was an outspoken advocate of civil liberties and was at constant risk from the strict censorship laws of the Catholic French monarchy. His polemics satirized intolerance and religious dogma, as well as the French institutions of his day. His best-known work and magnum opus, Candide, is a novella that comments on, criticizes, and ridicules many events, thinkers and philosophies of his time, most notably Gottfried Leibniz and his belief that our world is of necessity the "best of all possible worlds".

== Early life and education ==
François-Marie Arouet was born in Paris, the youngest of the five children of François Arouet, a lawyer who was a minor treasury official, and his wife, Marie Marguerite Daumard, whose family was on the lowest rank of the French nobility. Some speculation surrounds Voltaire's date of birth, because he claimed he was born on 20 February 1694 as the illegitimate son of a nobleman, Guérin de Rochebrune or Roquebrune. Two of his older brothers—Armand-François and Robert—died in infancy. His surviving brother Armand and sister Marguerite-Catherine were nine and seven years older, respectively.

Nicknamed "Zozo" by his family, Voltaire was baptized on 22 November 1694, with François de Castagnère, abbé de Châteauneuf, and Marie Daumard, the wife of his mother's cousin, standing as godparents. He was educated by the Jesuits at the Collège Louis-le-Grand (1704–1711), where he was taught Latin, theology, and rhetoric. Later in life he became fluent in Italian, Spanish, and English.

By the time he left school, Voltaire had decided he wanted to be a writer, against the wishes of his father, who wanted him to become a lawyer. Voltaire, pretending to work in Paris as an assistant to a notary, spent much of his time writing poetry. When his father found out, he sent Voltaire to study law, this time in Caen, Normandy. But the young man continued to write, producing essays and historical studies. Voltaire's wit made him popular among some of the aristocratic families with whom he mixed.

In 1713, his father obtained a job for him as a secretary to the new French ambassador in the Netherlands, the marquis de Châteauneuf, the brother of Voltaire's godfather. At The Hague, Voltaire fell in love with a French Protestant refugee named Catherine Olympe Dunoyer (known as 'Pimpette'). Their affair, considered scandalous, was discovered by de Châteauneuf and Voltaire was forced to return to France by the end of the year.

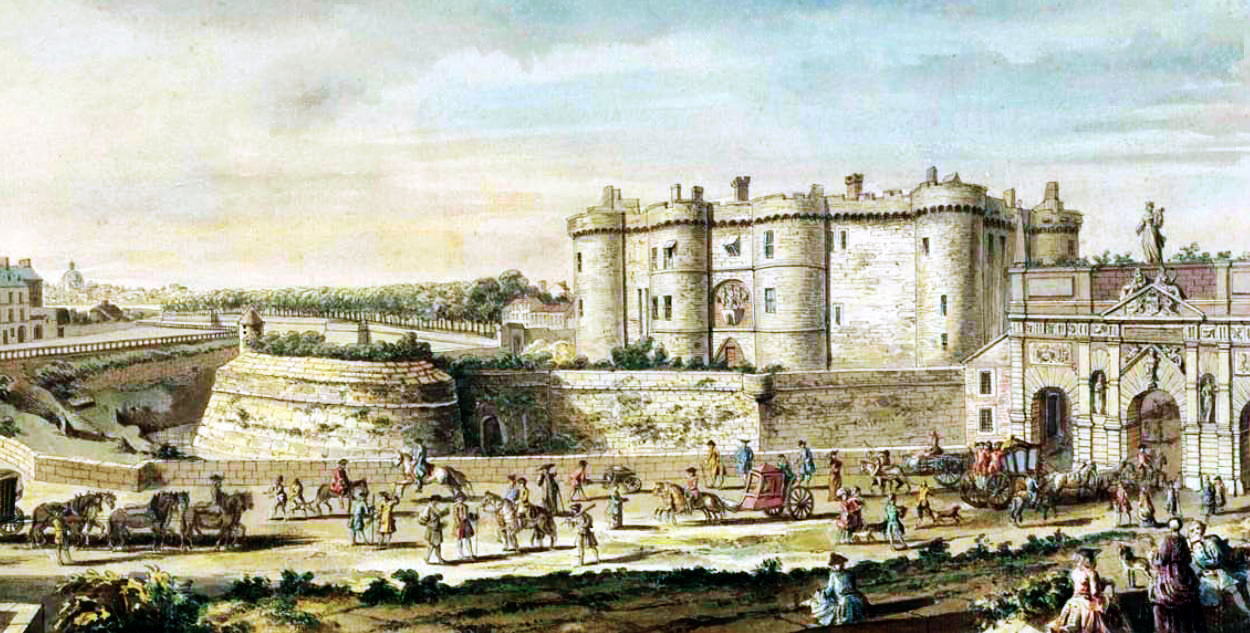
Voltaire was imprisoned in the Bastille from 16 May 1717 to 15 April 1718 in a windowless cell with ten-foot-thick walls.

Most of Voltaire's early life revolved around Paris. From early on, Voltaire had trouble with the authorities for critiques of the government. As a result, he was twice sentenced to prison and once to temporary exile to England. One satirical verse, in which Voltaire accused the Régent of incest with his daughter, resulted in an eleven-month imprisonment in the Bastille. The Comédie-Française had agreed in January 1717 to stage his debut play, Œdipe, and it opened in mid-November 1718, seven months after his release. Its immediate critical and financial success established his reputation. Both the Régent and King George I of Great Britain presented Voltaire with medals as a mark of their appreciation.

Voltaire mainly argued for religious tolerance and freedom of thought. He campaigned to eradicate priestly and aristo-monarchical authority, and supported a constitutional monarchy that protects people's rights.

=== Name ===
Arouet adopted the name Voltaire in 1718, following his incarceration at the Bastille. Its origin is unclear. It is an anagram of AROVET LI, the Latinized spelling of his surname, Arouet, and the initial letters of le jeune ("the young"). According to a family tradition among the descendants of his sister, he was known as le petit volontaire ("determined little thing") as a child, and he resurrected a variant of the name in his adult life. The name also reverses the syllables of Airvault, his family's home town in the Poitou region.

Richard Holmes supports the anagrammatic derivation of the name, but adds that a writer such as Voltaire would have intended it to also convey connotations of speed and daring. These come from associations with words such as voltige (acrobatics on a trapeze or horse), volte-face (a spinning about to face one's enemies), and volatile (originally, any winged creature). "Arouet" was not a noble name fit for his growing reputation, especially given that name's resonance with à rouer ("to be beaten up") and roué ("a profligate person").

In a letter to Jean-Baptiste Rousseau in March 1719, Voltaire concludes by asking that, if Rousseau wishes to send him a return letter, he do so by addressing it to Monsieur de Voltaire. A postscript explains: "J'ai été si malheureux sous le nom d'Arouet que j'en ai pris un autre surtout pour n'être plus confondu avec le poète Roi", ("I was so unhappy under the name of Arouet that I have taken another, primarily so as to cease to be confused with the poet Roi.") This probably refers to Adenes le Roi, and the 'oi' diphthong was then pronounced like modern 'ouai', so the similarity to 'Arouet' is clear, and thus, it could well have been part of his rationale. Voltaire is known also to have used at least 178 separate pen names during his lifetime.

== Career ==
=== Early fiction ===
Voltaire's next play, Artémire, set in ancient Macedonia, opened on 15 February 1720. It was a flop, and only fragments of the text survive. He instead turned to an epic poem about Henry IV of France that he had begun in early 1717. Denied a licence to publish, in August 1722 Voltaire headed north to find a publisher outside France. On the journey, he was accompanied by his mistress, Marie-Marguerite de Rupelmonde, a young widow.

At Brussels, Voltaire and Rousseau met up for a few days, before Voltaire and his mistress continued northwards. A publisher was eventually secured in The Hague. In the Netherlands, Voltaire was struck and impressed by the openness and tolerance of Dutch society. On his return to France, he secured a second publisher in Rouen, who agreed to publish La Henriade clandestinely. After Voltaire's recovery from a month-long smallpox infection in November 1723, the first copies were smuggled into Paris and distributed. While the poem was an instant success, Voltaire's new play, Mariamne, was a failure when it first opened in March 1724. Heavily reworked, it opened at the Comédie-Française in April 1725 to a much-improved reception. It was among the entertainments provided at the wedding of Louis XV and Marie Leszczyńska in September 1725.

=== Exile in England ===
In early 1726, Guy Auguste de Rohan-Chabot taunted Voltaire about his name change, who retorted that his name would win the esteem of the world, while Rohan would sully his own. A furious Rohan arranged for his servants to beat Voltaire a few days later. Seeking redress, Voltaire challenged Rohan to a duel, but the powerful Rohan family arranged for Voltaire to be arrested and imprisoned without trial in the Bastille on 17 April 1726. Fearing indefinite imprisonment, Voltaire asked to be exiled to England as an alternative punishment, which the French authorities accepted. On 2 May, he was escorted from the Bastille to Calais and embarked for England.

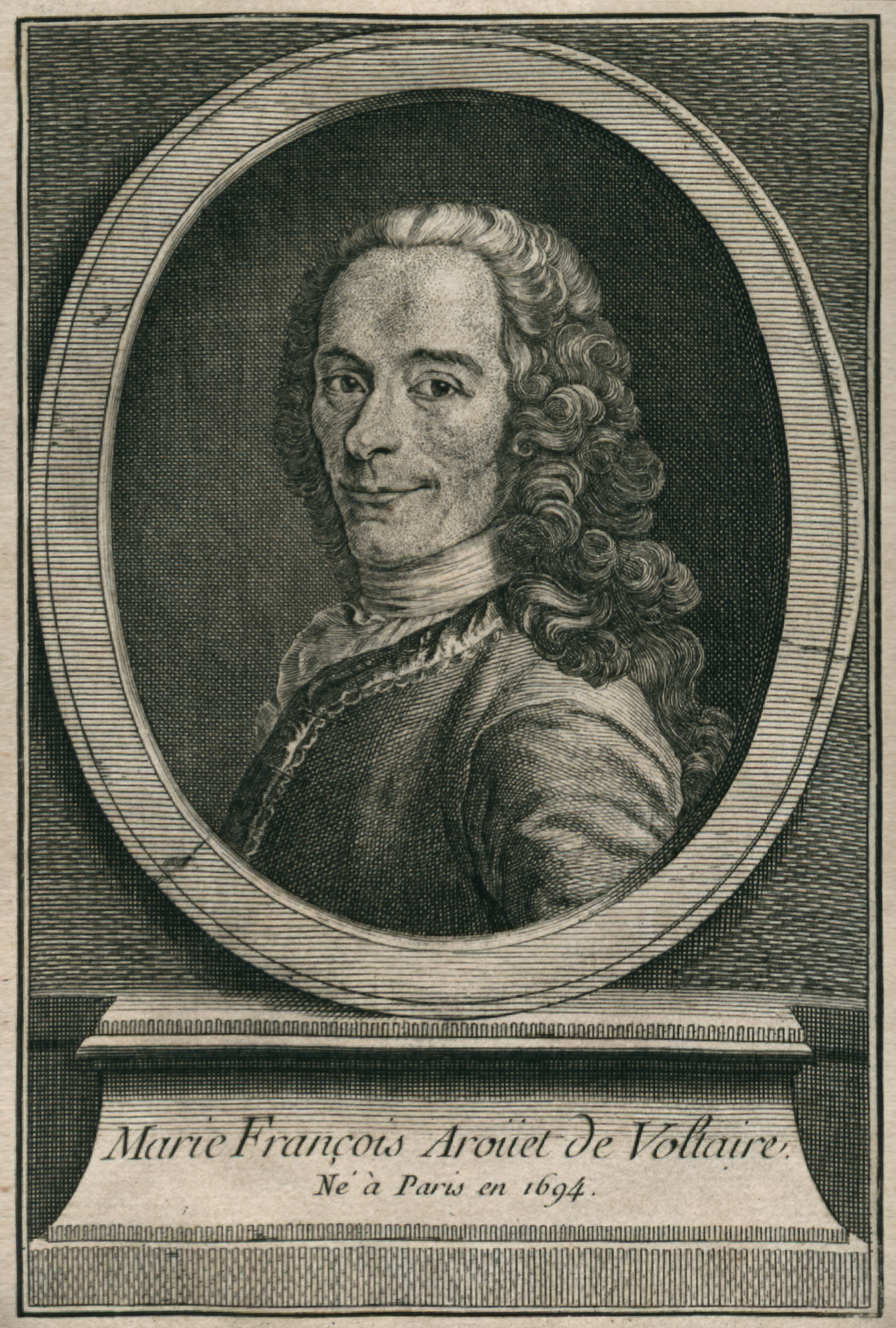
Elémens de la philosophie de Neuton, 1738

In England, Voltaire lived largely in Wandsworth, with acquaintances including Everard Fawkener, an English merchant whom he had met in Paris. In late 1726, he lived for a year in rented rooms on Durham Court, near today's John Adam Street, south of the Strand, in a house belonging to the former secretary of Lord Bolingbroke, which gave Voltaire an ideal location in the centre of the capital. From December 1727 to June 1728 he lodged above The White Peruke, a French barber/wig maker shop at 10 Maiden Lane, Covent Garden, now commemorated by a green plaque, to be nearer to his British publisher, Peter Vaillant, a Huguenot printer and bookseller. The Huguenot printing community located in this area had numerous French émigrés and a French church at the Savoy, making Voltaire feel at home. Voltaire took on a Quaker, Edward Higginson, as an English tutor. Voltaire's affinity for and familiarity with the Quakers was a major factor in the development of the stock figure of the "Good Quaker" as a paragon of virtue in the literature of the French Enlightenment.

Voltaire circulated throughout English high society, meeting Alexander Pope, John Gay, Jonathan Swift, Lady Mary Wortley Montagu, Sarah, Duchess of Marlborough, and many other members of the nobility and royalty. Voltaire's exile in England greatly influenced his thinking. He was intrigued by Britain's constitutional monarchy in contrast to French absolutism and by the country's greater freedom of speech and religion. He was influenced by the writers of the time and developed an interest in English literature, especially Shakespeare, who was still little known in continental Europe. Despite pointing out Shakespeare's deviations from neoclassical standards, Voltaire saw him as an example for French drama, which, though more polished, lacked on-stage action. Later, as Shakespeare's influence began growing in France, Voltaire tried to set a contrary example with his own plays, decrying what he considered Shakespeare's barbarities.

Voltaire may have been present at the funeral of Isaac Newton (Note: Dobre and Nyden suggest that there is no clear evidence that Voltaire was present; see Mihnea Dobre, Tammy Nyden (2013). Cartesian Empiricism. Springer. p. 89. ISBN 978-94-007-7690-6.) and met Newton's niece Catherine Conduitt. In 1727, Voltaire published two essays in English, Upon the Civil Wars of France, Extracted from Curious Manuscripts and Upon Epic Poetry of the European Nations, from Homer Down to Milton. He also published a letter about the Quakers after attending one of their services.

After two and a half years in exile, Voltaire returned to France, and after a few months in Dieppe, the authorities permitted him to return to Paris. At a dinner, French mathematician Charles Marie de La Condamine proposed buying up the lottery that was organized by the French government to pay off its debts, and Voltaire joined the consortium, earning perhaps a million livres. He invested the money cleverly and on this basis managed to convince the Court of Finances of his responsible conduct, allowing him to take control of a trust fund inherited from his father. He was now indisputably rich.

Further success followed in 1732 with his play Zaïre, which when published in 1733 carried a dedication to Fawkener praising English liberty and commerce. He published his admiring essays on British government, literature, religion, and science in Letters Concerning the English Nation (London, 1733). In 1734, they were published in Rouen as Lettres philosophiques, causing a huge scandal. (Note: Contrary to the idea that Voltaire wrote the Letters in English, they were written in French and then translated into English by John Lockman.) Published without approval of the royal censor, the essays lauded British constitutional monarchy as more developed and more respectful of human rights than its French counterpart, particularly regarding religious tolerance. The book was publicly burnt and banned, and Voltaire was again forced to flee Paris.

=== Château de Cirey ===
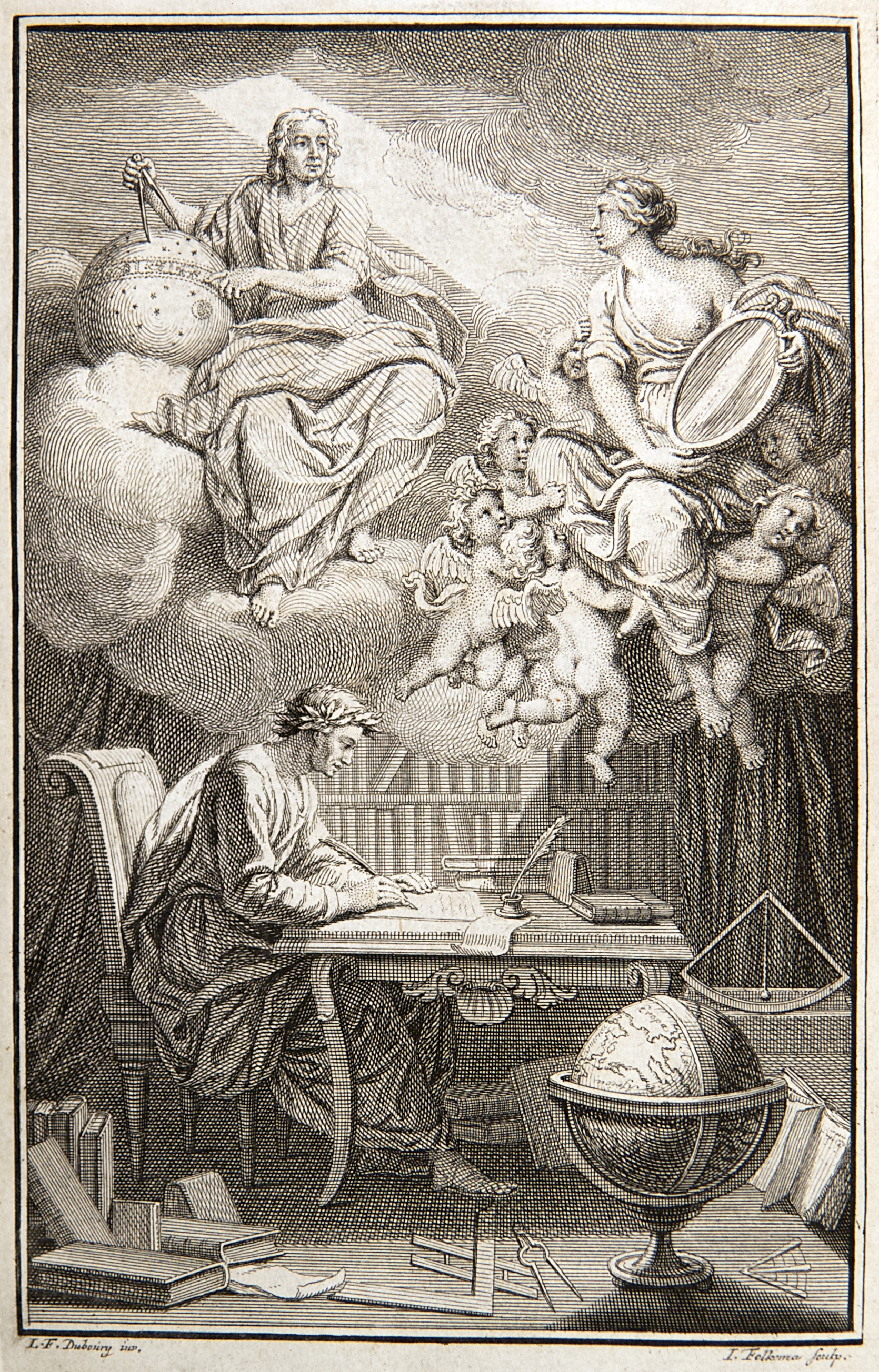
In the frontispiece to Voltaire's book on Newton's philosophy, Émilie du Châtelet appears as Voltaire's muse, reflecting Newton's heavenly insights down to Voltaire.

In 1733, Voltaire met Émilie du Châtelet (Marquise du Châtelet), a mathematician and married mother of three, who was 12 years his junior and with whom he was to have an affair for 16 years. To avoid arrest after the publication of Lettres philosophiques, Voltaire took refuge at her husband's château at Cirey on the borders of Champagne and Lorraine. Voltaire paid for the building's renovation, and Émilie's husband sometimes stayed at the château with his wife and her lover. The intellectual paramours collected around 21,000 books, an enormous number for the time. Together, they studied these books and performed scientific experiments at Cirey, including an attempt to determine the nature of fire.

Having learned from his previous brushes with the authorities, Voltaire began his habit of avoiding open confrontation with the authorities and denying any awkward responsibility. He continued to write plays, such as Mérope (or La Mérope française) and began his long researches into science and history. Again, a main source of inspiration for Voltaire were the years of his British exile, during which he had been strongly influenced by Newton's works. Voltaire strongly believed in Newton's theories; he performed experiments in optics at Cirey, and was one of the promulgators of the famous story of Newton's inspiration from the falling apple, which he had learned from Newton's niece in London and first mentioned in his Letters.

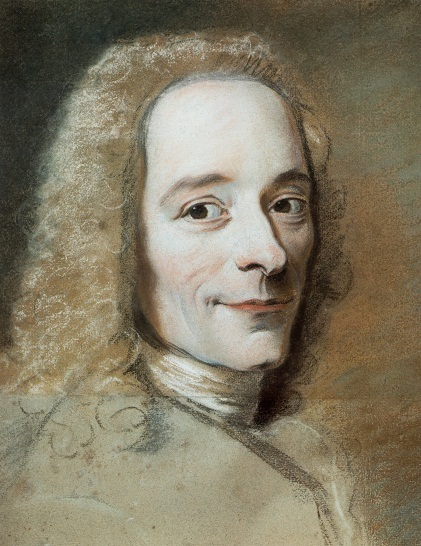
Pastel by Maurice Quentin de La Tour, 1735

In the fall of 1735, Voltaire was visited by Francesco Algarotti, who was preparing a book about Newton in Italian. Partly inspired by the visit, the Marquise translated Newton's Latin Principia into French, which remained the definitive French version into the 21st century. Both she and Voltaire were also curious about the philosophy of Gottfried Leibniz, a contemporary and rival of Newton. While Voltaire remained a firm Newtonian, the Marquise adopted certain aspects of Leibniz's critiques. Voltaire's own book Elements of the Philosophy of Newton made the great scientist accessible to a far greater public, and the Marquise wrote a celebratory review in the Journal des savants. Voltaire's work was instrumental in bringing about general acceptance of Newton's optical and gravitational theories in France, in contrast to the theories of Descartes.

Voltaire and the Marquise also studied history, particularly the great contributors to civilization. Voltaire's second essay in English had been "Essay upon the Civil Wars in France". It was followed by La Henriade, an epic poem on the French King Henri IV, glorifying his attempt to end the Catholic-Protestant massacres with the Edict of Nantes, which established religious toleration. There followed a historical novel on King Charles XII of Sweden. These, along with his Letters on the English, mark the beginning of Voltaire's open criticism of intolerance and established religions. Voltaire and the Marquise also explored philosophy, particularly metaphysical questions concerning the existence of God and the soul. Voltaire and the Marquise analyzed the Bible and concluded that much of its content was dubious. Voltaire's critical views on religion led to his belief in separation of church and state and religious freedom, ideas that he had formed after his stay in England.

In August 1736, Frederick the Great, then Crown Prince of Prussia and a great admirer of Voltaire, initiated a correspondence with him. That December, Voltaire moved to Holland for two months and became acquainted with the scientists Herman Boerhaave and Willem 's Gravesande. From mid-1739 to mid-1740 Voltaire lived largely in Brussels, at first with the Marquise, who was unsuccessfully attempting to pursue a 60-year-old family legal case regarding the ownership of two estates in Limburg.

In July 1740, he traveled to the Hague on behalf of Frederick in an attempt to dissuade a dubious publisher, van Duren, from printing without permission Frederick's Anti-Machiavel. In September Voltaire and Frederick (now King) met for the first time in Moyland Castle near Cleves and in November Voltaire was Frederick's guest in Berlin for two weeks, followed by a meeting in September 1742 at Aix-la-Chapelle. Voltaire was sent to Frederick's court in 1743 by the French government as an envoy and spy to gauge Frederick's military intentions in the War of the Austrian Succession.

Though deeply committed to the Marquise, Voltaire by 1744 found life at her château confining. On a visit to Paris that year, he found a new love—his niece. At first, his attraction to Marie Louise Mignot was clearly sexual, as evidenced by his letters to her (only discovered in 1957). Much later, they lived together, perhaps platonically, and remained together until Voltaire's death. Meanwhile, the Marquise also took a lover, the Marquis de Saint-Lambert.

=== Prussia ===
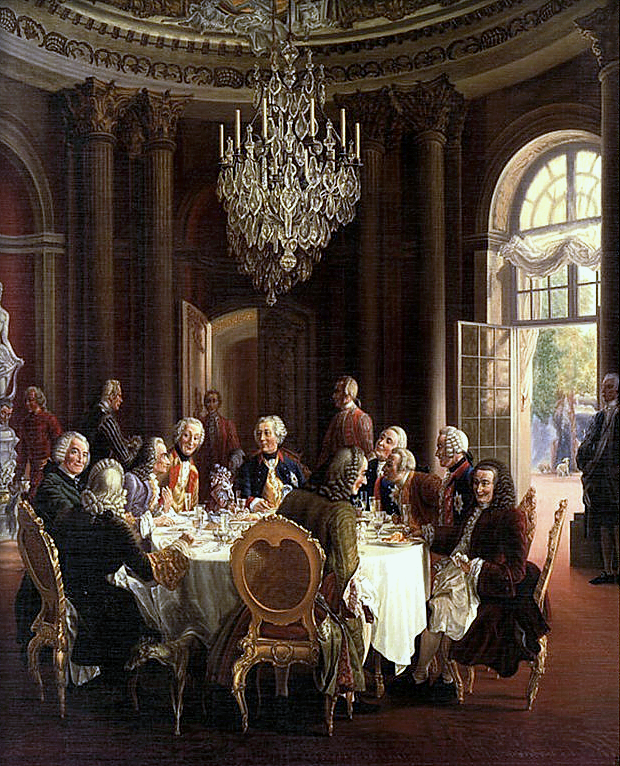
Die Tafelrunde by Adolph von Menzel: guests of Frederick the Great at Sanssouci, including members of the Prussian Academy of Sciences and Voltaire, third from left

After the death of the Marquise in childbirth in September 1749, Voltaire briefly returned to Paris and in mid-1750 moved to Potsdam, Prussia, at the invitation of Frederick the Great. The Prussian king (with the permission of Louis XV) made him a chamberlain in his household, appointed him to the Order of Merit, and gave him a salary of 20,000 French livres a year. He had rooms at Sanssouci and Charlottenburg Palace. Life went well for Voltaire at first, and in 1751 he completed Micromégas, a piece of science fiction involving ambassadors from another planet witnessing the follies of humankind. However, his relationship with Frederick began to deteriorate after he was accused of theft and forgery by a Jewish financier, Abraham Hirschel, who had invested in Saxon government bonds on behalf of Voltaire at a time when Frederick was involved in sensitive diplomatic negotiations with Saxony. Voltaire also substantially increased his wealth through moneylending, structuring large loans to European rulers and aristocrats as life annuities. In 1752, he lent 150,000 livres to Charles Eugene, Duke of Württemberg, securing an annual annuity of 15,750 livres for the remainder of his life and a reversionary annuity of 7,500 livres per year for his niece and companion, Marie Louise Mignot (Madame Denis), after his death.

He encountered other difficulties: an argument with Maupertuis, the president of the Berlin Academy of Science and a former rival for Émilie's affections, provoked Voltaire's Diatribe du docteur Akakia ("Diatribe of Doctor Akakia"), which satirized some of Maupertuis's theories and his persecutions of a mutual acquaintance, Johann Samuel König. This greatly angered Frederick, who ordered all copies of the document burned. On 1 January 1752, Voltaire offered to resign as chamberlain and return his insignia of the Order of Merit; at first, Frederick refused until eventually permitting Voltaire to leave in March.

On a slow journey back to France, Voltaire stayed at Leipzig and Gotha for a month each, and Kassel for two weeks, arriving at Frankfurt on 31 May. The following morning, he was detained at an inn by Frederick's agents, who held him in the city for over three weeks while Voltaire and Frederick argued by letter over the return of a satirical book of poetry Frederick had lent to Voltaire. Marie Louise joined him on 9 June. She and her uncle only left Frankfurt in July after she had defended herself from the unwanted advances of one of Frederick's agents, and Voltaire's luggage had been ransacked and valuable items taken.

Voltaire's attempts to vilify Frederick for his agents' actions at Frankfurt were largely unsuccessful, including his Mémoires pour Servir à la Vie de M. de Voltaire, published posthumously, in which he also explicitly made mention of Frederick's homosexuality, when he described how the king regularly invited pages, young cadets or lieutenants from his regiment to have coffee with him and then withdrew with the favourite for a brief sexual encounter. However, the correspondence between them continued, and though they never met in person again, after the Seven Years' War they largely reconciled.

=== Geneva and Ferney ===
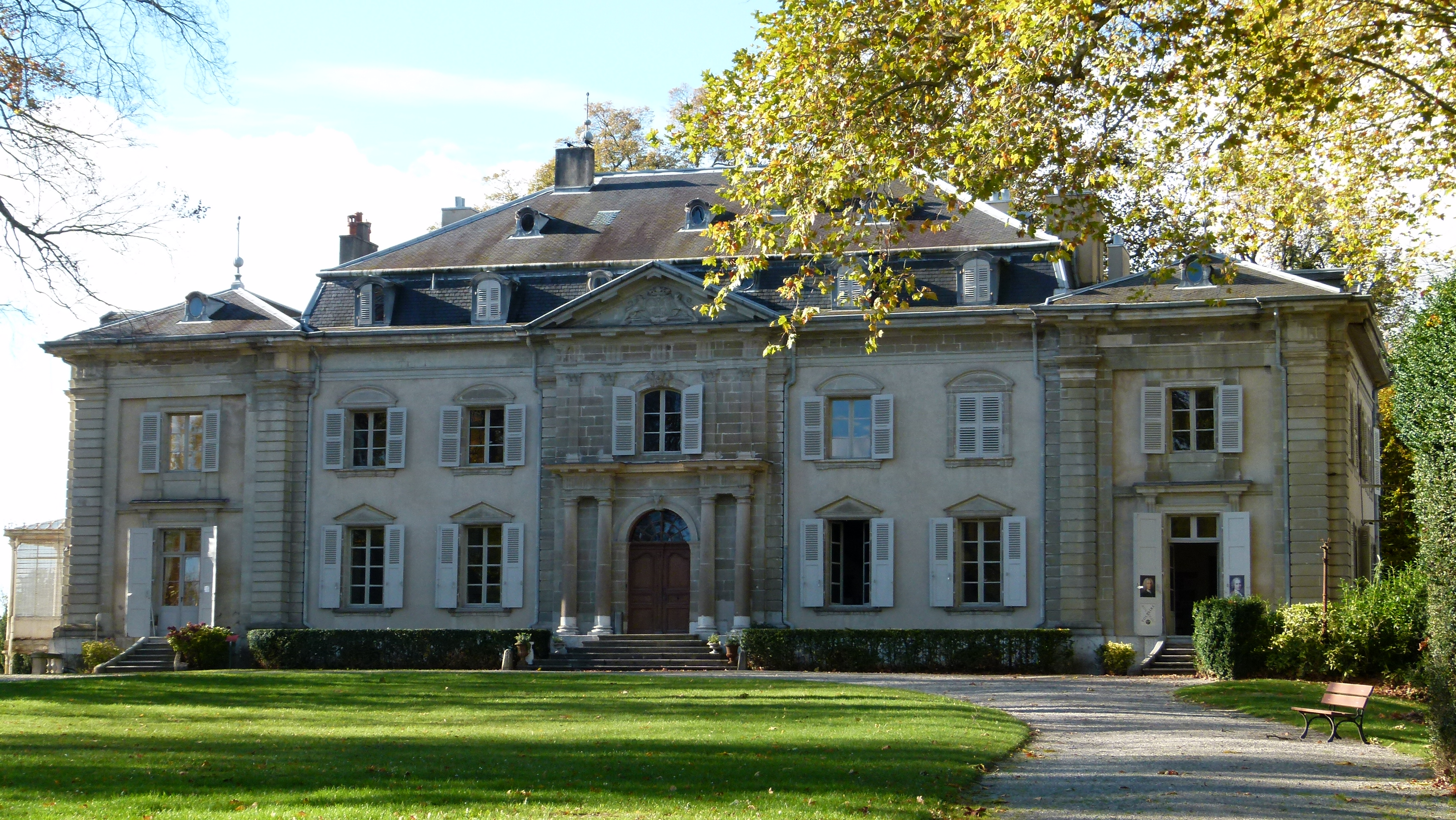
Voltaire's château at Ferney, France

Voltaire's slow progress toward Paris continued through Mainz, Mannheim, Strasbourg, and Colmar, but in January 1754 Louis XV banned him from Paris, and he turned for Geneva, near which he bought a large estate (Les Délices) in early 1755. Though he was received openly at first, the law in Geneva, which banned theatrical performances, and the publication of The Maid of Orleans against his will soured his relationship with Calvinist Genevans. In late 1758, he bought an even larger estate at Ferney, on the French side of the Franco-Swiss border. The town would adopt his name, calling itself Ferney-Voltaire, and this became its official name in 1878.

Early in 1759, Voltaire completed and published Candide, ou l'Optimisme (Candide, or Optimism). This satire on Leibniz's philosophy of optimistic determinism remains Voltaire's best-known work. He would stay in Ferney for most of the remaining 20 years of his life, frequently entertaining distinguished guests, such as James Boswell (who recorded their conversations in his journal and memoranda), Adam Smith, Giacomo Casanova, and Edward Gibbon. In 1764, he published one of his best-known philosophical works, the Dictionnaire philosophique, a series of articles mainly on Christian history and dogmas, a few of which were originally written in Berlin.

From 1762, as an unmatched intellectual celebrity, he began to champion unjustly persecuted individuals, most famously the Huguenot merchant Jean Calas. Calas had been tortured to death in 1763, supposedly because he had murdered his eldest son for wanting to convert to Catholicism. His possessions were confiscated, and his two daughters were taken from his widow and forced into Catholic convents. Voltaire, seeing this as a clear case of religious persecution, managed to overturn the conviction in 1765.

Voltaire was initiated into Freemasonry a little over a month before his death. On 4 April 1778, he attended la Loge des Neuf Sœurs in Paris, and became an Entered Apprentice Freemason. According to some sources, "Benjamin Franklin ... urged Voltaire to become a freemason; and Voltaire agreed, perhaps only to please Franklin." However, Franklin was merely a visitor at the time Voltaire was initiated, the two only met a month before Voltaire's death, and their interactions with each other were brief.

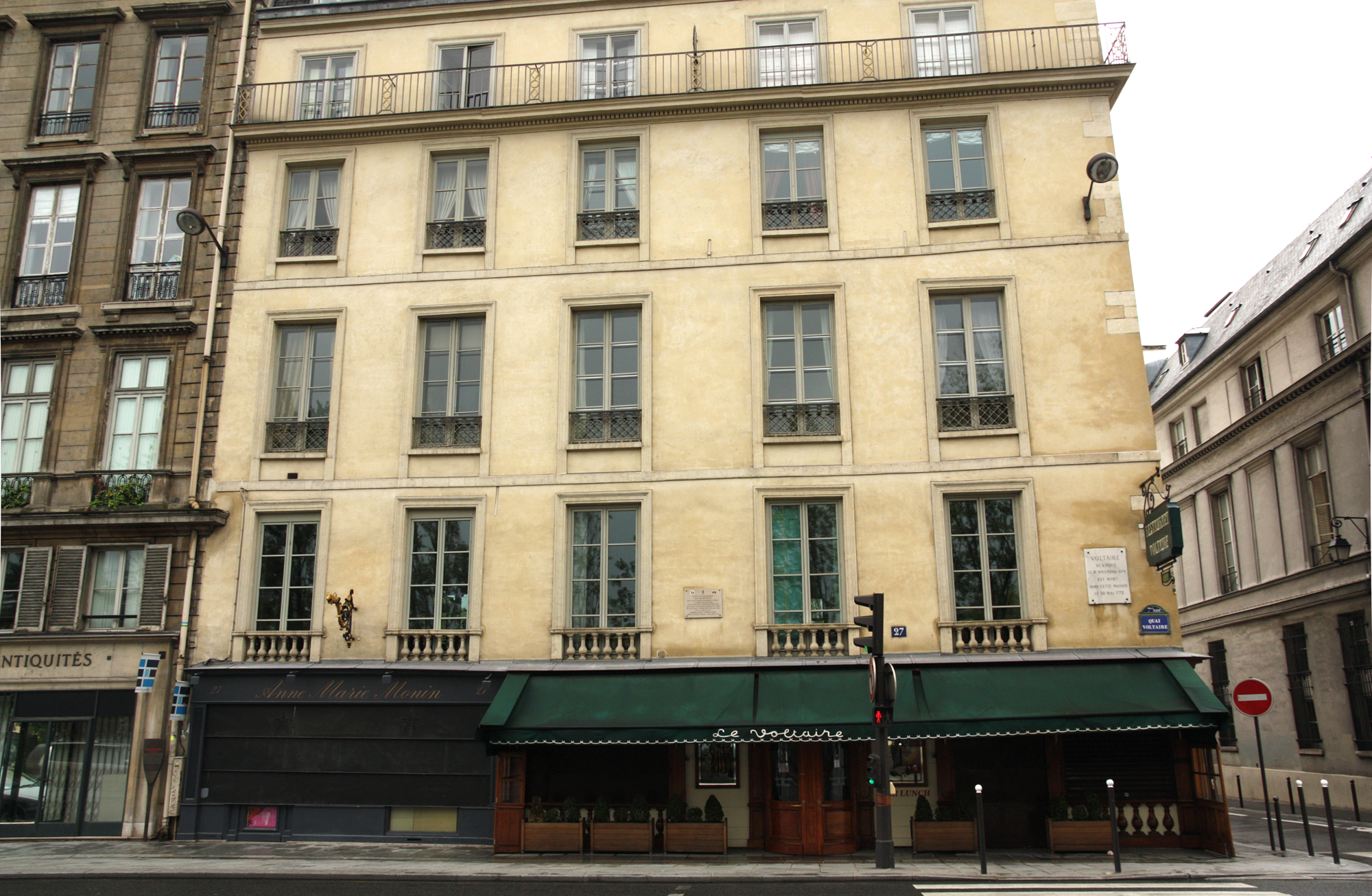
The house in Paris where Voltaire died

== Death and burial ==
In February 1778, Voltaire returned to Paris for the first time in over 25 years, partly to see the opening of his latest tragedy, Irène. The five-day journey was too much for the 83-year-old, and he believed he was about to die on 28 February, writing "I die adoring God, loving my friends, not hating my enemies, and detesting superstition." He recovered, and in March he saw a performance of Irène, being treated by the audience as a returning hero.

He soon became ill again and died on 30 May 1778. The accounts of his deathbed have been numerous and varying, and it has not been possible to establish the details of what precisely occurred. His enemies related that he repented and accepted the last rites from a Catholic priest, or that he died in agony of body and soul, while his adherents told of his defiance to his last breath. According to one story of his last words, when the priest urged him to renounce Satan, he replied, "This is no time to make new enemies."

Because of his well-known criticism of the Church, which he had refused to retract before his death, Voltaire was denied a Christian burial in Paris, but friends and relations managed to bury his body secretly at the Abbey of Scellières in Champagne, where Marie Louise's brother was abbé. His heart and brain were embalmed separately.

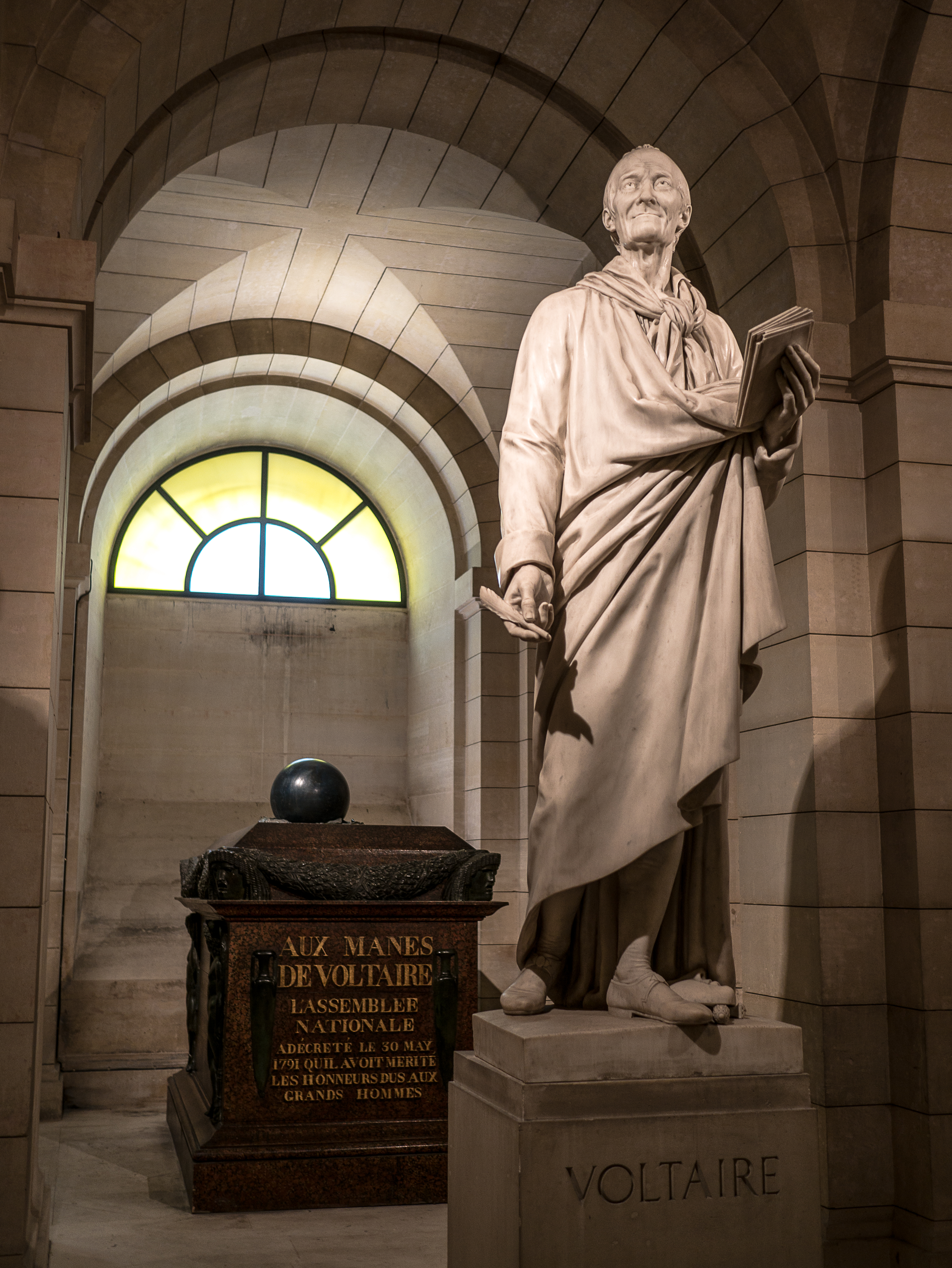
Voltaire's tomb in the Paris Panthéon

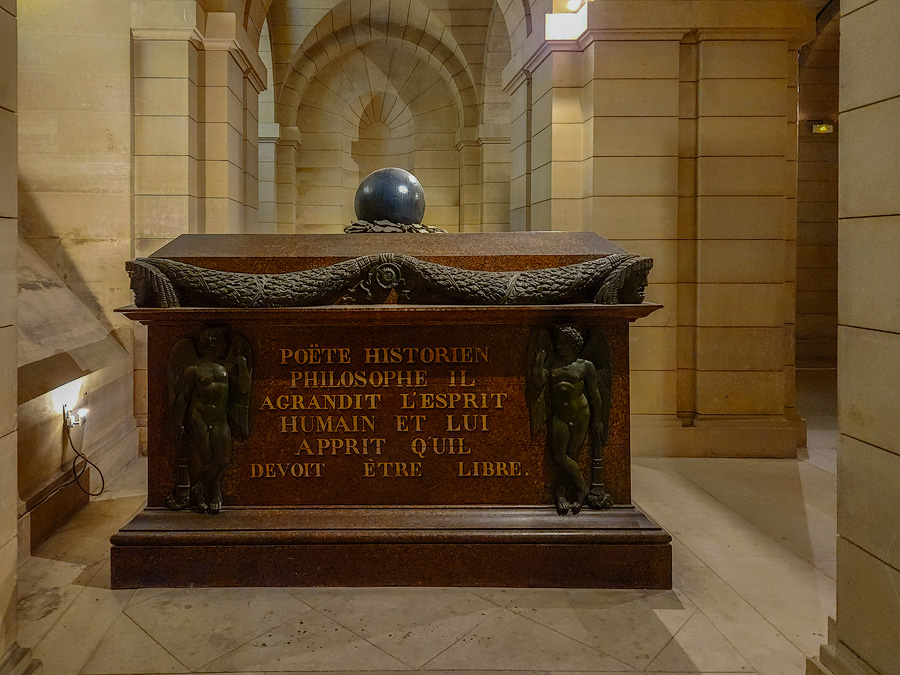
Tomb of Voltaire in the Pantheon in Paris

On 11 July 1791, the National Assembly of France, regarding Voltaire as a forerunner of the French Revolution, had his remains brought back to Paris and enshrined in the Panthéon. (Note: It was rumoured that in May 1814, his and Rousseau's bones were removed from the Panthéon and discarded on the outskirts of Paris by supporters of the Bourbon Restoration. Both tombs were opened in 1897, and the remains were still there. Nevertheless, some modern historians have published the rumor as fact.) An estimated million people attended the procession, which stretched throughout Paris. There was an elaborate ceremony, including music composed for the event by André Grétry.

== Writings ==
=== History ===
Voltaire was seminal to the development of historiography, particularly of France. Professor of history Guillaume de Syon argues:

Voltaire recast historiography in both factual and analytical terms. Not only did he reject traditional biographies and accounts that claim the work of supernatural forces, but he went so far as to suggest that earlier historiography was rife with falsified evidence and required new investigations at the source. Such an outlook was not unique in that the scientific spirit that 18th-century intellectuals perceived themselves as invested with. A rationalistic approach was key to rewriting history.

Voltaire's best-known histories are History of Charles XII (1731), The Age of Louis XIV (1751), and his Essay on the Customs and the Spirit of the Nations (1756). He broke from the tradition of narrating diplomatic and military events, and emphasized customs, social history and achievements in the arts and sciences. The Essay on Customs traced the progress of world civilization in a universal context, rejecting both nationalism and the traditional Christian frame of reference. Influenced by Bossuet's Discourse on Universal History (1682), he was the first scholar to attempt seriously a history of the world, eliminating theological frameworks, and emphasizing economics, culture and political history. He treated Europe as a whole rather than a collection of nations. He was the first to emphasize the debt of medieval culture to Middle Eastern civilization, but otherwise was weak on the Middle Ages. Although he repeatedly warned against political bias on the part of the historian, he did not miss many opportunities to expose the intolerance and frauds of the church over the ages. Voltaire advised scholars that anything contradicting the normal course of nature was not to be believed. Although he found evil in the historical record, he fervently believed reason and expanding literacy would lead to progress.

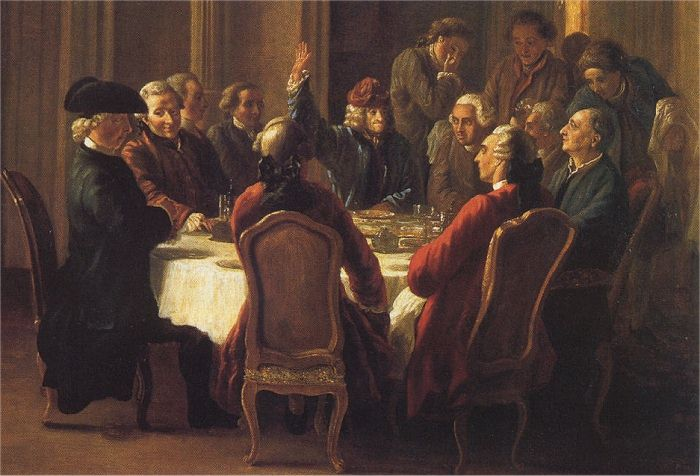
Voltaire with Denis Diderot, Jean le Rond d'Alembert, Marquis de Condorcet and Jean-François de La Harpe

Voltaire explains his view of historiography in his article on "History" in Diderot's Encyclopédie: "One demands of modern historians more details, better ascertained facts, precise dates, more attention to customs, laws, mores, commerce, finance, agriculture, population." Voltaire's histories imposed the values of the Enlightenment on the past, but at the same time he helped free historiography from antiquarianism, Eurocentrism, religious intolerance and a concentration on great men, diplomacy, and warfare. Yale professor Peter Gay says Voltaire wrote "very good history", citing his "scrupulous concern for truths", "careful sifting of evidence", "intelligent selection of what is important", "keen sense of drama", and "grasp of the fact that a whole civilization is a unit of study".

=== Poetry ===
From an early age, Voltaire displayed a talent for writing verse, and his first published work was poetry. He wrote two book-long epic poems, including the first ever written in French, the Henriade, and later, The Maid of Orleans, besides many other smaller pieces.

The Henriade was written in imitation of Virgil, using the alexandrine couplet reformed and rendered monotonous for modern readers but it was a huge success in the 18th and early 19th century, with sixty-five editions and translations into several languages. The epic poem transformed French King Henry IV into a national hero for his attempts at instituting tolerance with his Edict of Nantes. La Pucelle, on the other hand, is a burlesque on the legend of Joan of Arc.

=== Prose ===
Many of Voltaire's prose works and romances, usually composed as pamphlets, were written as polemics. Candide attacks the passivity inspired by Leibniz's philosophy of optimism through the character Pangloss's frequent refrain that, because God created it, this is of necessity the "best of all possible worlds". L'Homme aux quarante ecus (The Man of Forty Pieces of Silver) addresses social and political ways of the time; Zadig and others, the received forms of moral and metaphysical orthodoxy; and some were written to deride the Bible. In these works, Voltaire's ironic style, free of exaggeration, is apparent, particularly the restraint and simplicity of the verbal treatment. Candide in particular is the best example of his style. Voltaire also has—in common with Jonathan Swift—the distinction of paving the way for science fiction's philosophical irony, particularly in his Micromégas and the vignette "Plato's Dream" (1756).

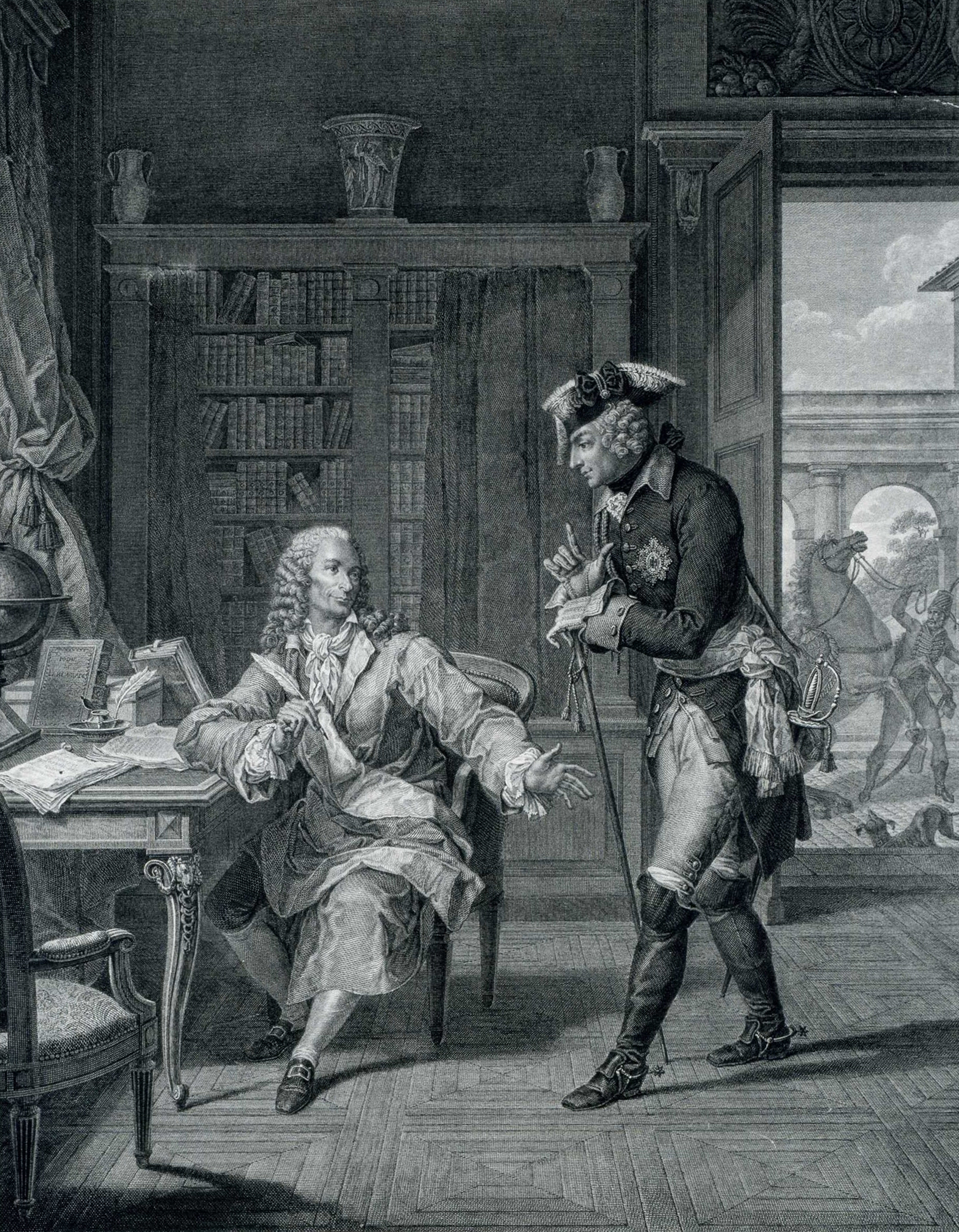
Voltaire with Frederick the Great at Sanssouci

In general, his criticism and miscellaneous writing show a similar style to Voltaire's other works. Almost all of his more substantive works, whether in verse or prose, are preceded by prefaces of one sort or another, which are models of his caustic yet conversational tone. In a vast variety of nondescript pamphlets and writings, he displays his skills at journalism. In pure literary criticism his principal work is the Commentaire sur Corneille, although he wrote many more similar works—sometimes (as in his Life and Notices of Molière) independently and sometimes as part of his Siècles.

Voltaire's works, especially his private letters, frequently urge the reader: "écrasez l'infâme", or "crush the infamous". The phrase refers to contemporaneous abuses of power by royal and religious authorities, and the superstition and intolerance fomented by the clergy. He had seen and felt these effects in his own exiles, the burnings of his books and those of many others, and in the atrocious persecution of Jean Calas and François-Jean de la Barre. He stated in one of his most famous quotes that "Superstition sets the whole world in flames; philosophy quenches them" (La superstition met le monde entier en flammes; la philosophie les éteint).

The most oft-cited Voltaire quotation is apocryphal. He is incorrectly credited with writing, "I disapprove of what you say, but I will defend to the death your right to say it." These were not his words, but rather those of Evelyn Beatrice Hall, written under the pseudonym S. G. Tallentyre in her 1906 biographical book The Friends of Voltaire. Hall intended to summarize in her own words Voltaire's attitude towards Claude Adrien Helvétius and his controversial book De l'esprit, but her first-person expression was mistaken for an actual quotation from Voltaire. Her interpretation does capture the spirit of Voltaire's attitude towards Helvétius; it had been said Hall's summary was inspired by a quotation found in a 1770 Voltaire letter to an Abbot le Riche, in which he was reported to have said, "I detest what you write, but I would give my life to make it possible for you to continue to write." Nevertheless, scholars believe there must have again been misinterpretation, as the letter does not seem to contain any such quote. (Note: Charles Wirz, archivist at the Voltaire Institute and Museum in Geneva, recalled in 1994, that Hall 'wrongly' placed this quotation between speech marks in two of her works about Voltaire, recognising expressly the quotation in question was not one, in a letter of 9 May 1939, which was published in 1943 in volume LVIII under the title "Voltaire never said it" (pp. 534–35) of the review Modern language notes, Johns Hopkins Press, 1943, Baltimore. An extract from the letter: 'The phrase "I disapprove of what you say, but I will defend to the death your right to say it" which you have found in my book Voltaire in His Letters is my own expression and should not have been put in inverted commas. Please accept my apologies for having, quite unintentionally, misled you into thinking I was quoting a sentence used by Voltaire (or anyone else but myself).' The words "my own" were underlined personally by Hall in her letter. To believe certain commentators – Norbert Guterman, A Book of French Quotations, 1963 – Hall was referencing back to a Voltaire letter of 6 February 1770 to an abbot le Riche where Voltaire supposedly said, "Reverend, I hate what you write, but I will give my life so that you can continue to write." The problem is that, if you consult the letter itself, the sentence there does not appear, nor even the idea: "A M Le Riche a Amiens. 6 February. You left, Sir, des Welches for des Welches. You will find everywhere barbarians obstinate. The number of wise will always be small. It is true ... it has increased; but it is nothing in comparison with the stupid ones; and, by misfortune, one says that God is always for the big battalions. It is necessary that the decent people stick together and stay under cover. There are no means that their small troop could tackle the party of the fanatics in open country. I was very sick, I was near death every winter; this is the reason, Sir, why I have answered you so late. I am not less touched by it than your memory. Continue to me your friendship; it comforts me my evils and stupidities of the human genre. Receive my assurances, etc." Voltaire, however, did not hesitate to wish censure against slander and personal libels. Here is what he writes in his "Atheism" article in the Dictionnaire philosophique: "Aristophanes (this man that the commentators admire because he was Greek, not thinking that Socrates was Greek also), Aristophanes was the first who accustomed the Athenians to consider Socrates an atheist. ... The tanners, the shoemakers and the dressmakers of Athens applauded a joke in which one represented Socrates raised in the air in a basket, announcing there was God, and praising himself to have stolen a coat by teaching philosophy. A whole people, whose bad government authorized such infamous licences, deserved well what it got, to become the slave of the Romans, and today of the Turks.")

Voltaire's first major philosophical work in his battle against "l'infâme" was the Traité sur la tolérance (Treatise on Tolerance), exposing the Calas affair, along with the tolerance exercised by other faiths and in other eras (for example, by the Jews, the Romans, the Greeks and the Chinese). Then, in his Dictionnaire philosophique, containing such articles as "Abraham", "Genesis", "Church Council", he wrote about what he perceived as the human origins of dogmas and beliefs, as well as inhuman behavior of religious and political institutions in shedding blood over the quarrels of competing sects. Amongst other targets, Voltaire criticized France's colonial policy in North America, dismissing the vast territory of New France as "a few acres of snow" ("quelques arpents de neige").

=== Letters ===
Voltaire also engaged in an enormous amount of private correspondence during his life, totalling over 20,000 letters. Theodore Besterman's collected edition of these letters, completed only in 1964, fills 102 volumes. One historian called the letters "a feast not only of wit and eloquence but of warm friendship, humane feeling, and incisive thought."

In Voltaire's correspondence with Catherine the Great he derided democracy. He wrote, "Almost nothing great has ever been done in the world except by the genius and firmness of a single man combating the prejudices of the multitude."

== Philosophy and religion ==
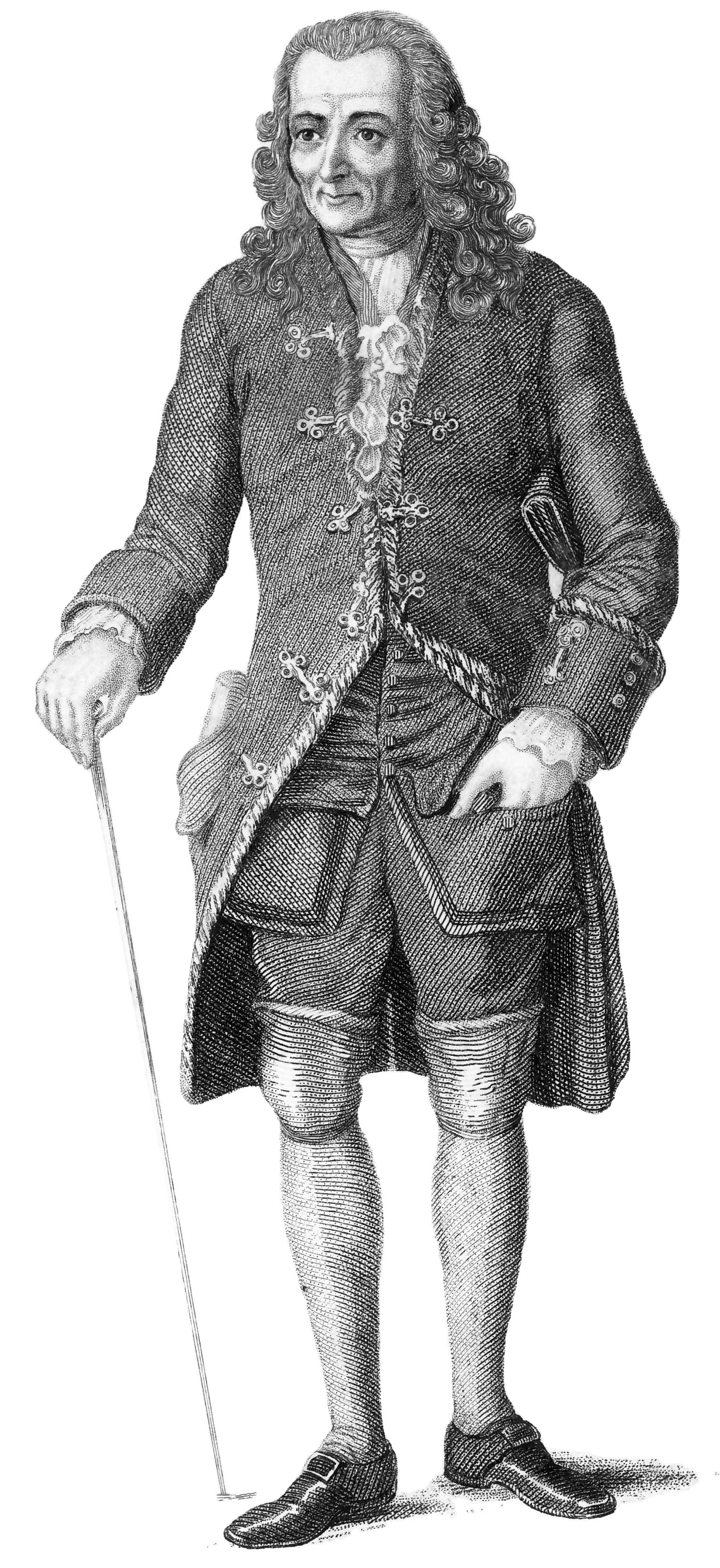
Voltaire at 70. Engraving from the 1843 edition of his Philosophical Dictionary

Like other Enlightenment thinkers, Voltaire was a deist. He challenged orthodoxy by asking: "What is faith? Is it to believe that which is evident? No. It is perfectly evident to my mind that there exists a necessary, eternal, supreme, and intelligent being. This is no matter of faith, but of reason."

In a 1763 essay, Voltaire supported the toleration of other religions and ethnicities: "It does not require great art, or magnificently trained eloquence, to prove that Christians should tolerate each other. I, however, am going further: I say that we should regard all men as our brothers. What? The Turk my brother? The Chinaman my brother? The Jew? The Siam? Yes, without doubt; are we not all children of the same father and creatures of the same God?"

In one of his many denunciations of priests of every religious sect, Voltaire describes them as those who "rise from an incestuous bed, manufacture a hundred versions of God, then eat and drink God, then piss and shit God."

=== Christianity ===
Historians have described Voltaire's description of the history of Christianity as "propagandistic". His Dictionnaire philosophique is responsible for the myth that the early Church had fifty gospels before settling on the standard canonical four as well as propagating the myth that the canon of the New Testament was decided at the First Council of Nicaea. Voltaire is partially responsible for the misattribution of the expression Credo quia absurdum to the Church Fathers.

Despite the death of Hypatia being the result of finding herself in the crossfires of a mob (likely Christian) during a political feud in 4th-century Alexandria, Voltaire promoted the theory that she was stripped naked and murdered by the minions of the bishop Cyril of Alexandria, concluding by stating that "when one finds a beautiful woman completely naked, it is not for the purpose of massacring her." Voltaire meant for this argument to bolster one of his anti-Catholic tracts. In a letter to Frederick the Great, dated 5 January 1767, he wrote about Christianity:

La nôtre [religion] est sans contredit la plus ridicule, la plus absurde, et la plus sanguinaire qui ait jamais infecté le monde.
"Ours [i.e., the Christian religion] is assuredly the most ridiculous, the most absurd and the most bloody religion which has ever infected this world. Your Majesty will do the human race an eternal service by extirpating this infamous superstition, I do not say among the rabble, who are not worthy of being enlightened and who are apt for every yoke; I say among honest people, among men who think, among those who wish to think. ... My one regret in dying is that I cannot aid you in this noble enterprise, the finest and most respectable which the human mind can point out."

In La bible enfin expliquée, he expressed the following attitude to lay reading of the Bible:

It is characteristic of fanatics who read the holy scriptures to tell themselves: God killed, so I must kill; Abraham lied, Jacob deceived, Rachel stole: so I must steal, deceive, lie. But, wretch, you are neither Rachel, nor Jacob, nor Abraham, nor God; you are just a mad fool, and the popes who forbade the reading of the Bible were extremely wise.

Voltaire's opinion of the Bible was mixed. Although influenced by Socinian works such as the Bibliotheca Fratrum Polonorum, Voltaire's skeptical attitude to the Bible separated him from Unitarian theologians like Fausto Sozzini or even Biblical-political writers like John Locke. His statements on religion also brought down on him the fury of the Jesuits and in particular Claude-Adrien Nonnotte. This did not hinder his religious practice, though it did win for him a bad reputation in certain religious circles. The deeply Christian Wolfgang Amadeus Mozart wrote to his father the year of Voltaire's death, saying, "The arch-scoundrel Voltaire has finally kicked the bucket ..." Voltaire was later deemed to influence Edward Gibbon in claiming that Christianity was a contributor to the fall of the Roman Empire in his book The History of the Decline and Fall of the Roman Empire:

As Christianity advances, disasters befall the [Roman] empire—arts, science, literature, decay—barbarism and all its revolting concomitants are made to seem the consequences of its decisive triumph—and the unwary reader is conducted, with matchless dexterity, to the desired conclusion—the abominable Manicheism of Candide, and, in fact, of all the productions of Voltaire's historic school—viz., "that instead of being a merciful, ameliorating, and benignant visitation, the religion of Christians would rather seem to be a scourge sent on man by the author of all evil."

Voltaire acknowledged the self-sacrifice of Christians. He wrote: "Perhaps there is nothing greater on earth than the sacrifice of youth and beauty, often of high birth, made by the gentle sex in order to work in hospitals for the relief of human misery, the sight of which is so revolting to our delicacy. Peoples separated from the Roman religion have imitated but imperfectly so generous a charity." Yet, according to Daniel-Rops, Voltaire's "hatred of religion increased with the passage of years. The attack, launched at first against clericalism and theocracy, ended in a furious assault upon Holy Scripture, the dogmas of the Church, and even upon the person of Jesus Christ Himself, who [he] depicted now as a degenerate." Voltaire's reasoning may be summed up in his well-known saying, "Those who can make you believe absurdities can make you commit atrocities."

=== Judaism ===
According to Orthodox rabbi Joseph Telushkin, the most significant Enlightenment hostility against Judaism was found in Voltaire; 30 of the 118 articles in his Dictionnaire philosophique dealt with Jews or Judaism, describing them in consistently negative ways. For example, he wrote: "In short, we find in them only an ignorant and barbarous people, who have long united the most sordid avarice with the most detestable superstition and the most invincible hatred for every people by whom they are tolerated and enriched." Telushkin states that Voltaire did not limit his attack to aspects of Judaism that Christianity used as a foundation, repeatedly making it clear that he despised Jews.

On the other hand, Peter Gay, a contemporary authority on the Enlightenment, points to Voltaire's remarks (for instance, that the Jews were more tolerant than the Christians) in the Traité sur la tolérance and surmises that "Voltaire struck at the Jews to strike at Christianity". Whatever anti-semitism Voltaire may have felt, Gay suggests, derived from negative personal experience.

Arthur Hertzberg, a Conservative Rabbi, claims that Gay's second suggestion is untenable, as Voltaire himself denied its validity when he remarked that he had "forgotten about much larger bankruptcies through Christians". However, Bertram Schwarzbach's far more detailed studies of Voltaire's dealings with Jewish people throughout his life concluded that he was anti-biblical, not anti-semitic. His remarks on the Jews and their "superstitions" were essentially no different from his remarks on Christians.

Voltaire said of the Jews that they "have surpassed all nations in impertinent fables, in bad conduct and in barbarism. You deserve to be punished, for this is your destiny." He further said, "They are, all of them, born with raging fanaticism in their hearts, just as the Bretons and the Germans are born with blond hair. I would not be in the least bit surprised if these people would not some day become deadly to the human race."

Some authors link Voltaire's anti-Judaism to his polygenism. According to Joxe Azurmendi this anti-Judaism has a relative importance in Voltaire's philosophy of history. However, Voltaire's anti-Judaism influenced later authors like Ernest Renan.

Voltaire did have a Jewish friend, Daniel de Fonseca, whom he esteemed highly, and proclaimed him as "the only philosopher, perhaps, among the Jews of his time".

Voltaire condemned the persecution of Jews on several occasions, including in Henriade, and he never advocated violence or attacks against them. According to the historian Will Durant, Voltaire praised the simplicity, sobriety, regularity, and industry of Jews, but became strongly anti-Semitic after some personal financial transactions and quarrels with Jewish financiers. In his Essai sur les moeurs Voltaire denounced the ancient Hebrews in strong language.

The anti-Semitic passages in Voltaire's Dictionnaire philosophique were criticized by Isaac De Pinto in 1762. Voltaire agreed with the criticism of the anti-Semitic passages and stated that De Pinto's letter convinced him that there are "highly intelligent and cultivated people" among the Jews and that he had been "wrong to attribute to a whole nation the vices of some individuals". He also promised to revise the objectionable passages for forthcoming editions of the Dictionnaire philosophique, but he failed to do so.

=== Islam ===
Voltaire's views about Islam were generally negative, and he found its holy book, the Quran, to be ignorant of the laws of physics. In a 1740 letter to Frederick the Great, Voltaire ascribes to Muhammad a brutality that "is assuredly nothing any man can excuse" and suggests that his following stemmed from superstition. Voltaire continued, "But that a camel-merchant should stir up insurrection in his village; that in league with some miserable followers he persuades them that he talks with the angel Gabriel; that he boasts of having been carried to heaven, where he received in part this unintelligible book, each page of which makes common sense shudder; that, to pay homage to this book, he delivers his country to iron and flame; that he cuts the throats of fathers and kidnaps daughters; that he gives to the defeated the choice of his religion or death: this is assuredly nothing any man can excuse, at least if he was not born a Turk, or if superstition has not extinguished all natural light in him."

In 1748, after having read Henri de Boulainvilliers and George Sale, he wrote again about Mohammed and Islam in "De l'Alcoran et de Mahomet" ("On the Quran and on Mohammed"). In this essay, Voltaire maintained that Mohammed was a "sublime charlatan". (Note: Written and published in 1748 in Volume IV of the Œuvres de Voltaire, following his Tragedy of Mahomet.) Drawing on complementary information in Herbelot's Bibliothèque orientale ('Oriental Library'), Voltaire, according to René Pomeau, adjudged the Quran, with its "contradictions, ... absurdities, ... anachronisms", to be "rhapsody, without connection, without order, and without art".

Thus he "henceforward conceded" that "if his book was bad for our times and for us, it was very good for his contemporaries, and his religion even more so. It must be admitted that he removed almost all of Asia from idolatry" and that "it was difficult for such a simple and wise religion, taught by a man who was constantly victorious, could hardly fail to subjugate a portion of the earth." He considered that "its civil laws are good; its dogma is admirable which it has in common with ours" but that "his means are shocking; deception and murder".

In his Essay on the Manners and Spirit of Nations (published 1756), Voltaire deals with the history of Europe before Charlemagne to the dawn of the age of Louis XIV, and that of the colonies and the East. As a historian, he devoted several chapters to Islam, He highlighted the Arabian, Turkish courts, and conducts. Here he called Mohammed a "poet", and stated that he was not an illiterate. As a "legislator", he "changed the face of part of Europe [and] one half of Asia."

In chapter VI, Voltaire finds similarities between Arabs and ancient Hebrews, that they both kept running to battle in the name of God, and sharing a passion for the spoils of war. Voltaire continues that, "It is to be believed that Mohammed, like all enthusiasts, violently struck by his ideas, first presented them in good faith, strengthened them with fantasy, fooled himself in fooling others, and supported through necessary deceptions a doctrine which he considered good." He thus compares "the genius of the Arab people" with "the genius of the ancient Romans".

According to Malise Ruthven, as Voltaire learned more about Islam, his opinion of the faith became more positive. As a result, his play Mahomet inspired Goethe, who was attracted to Islam, to write a drama on this theme, though he completed only the poem "Mahomets-Gesang" ("Mahomet's Singing").

==== Drama Mahomet ====
The tragedy Fanaticism, or Mahomet the Prophet (French: Le fanatisme, ou Mahomet le Prophete) was written in 1736 by Voltaire. The play is a study of religious fanaticism and self-serving manipulation. The character Muhammad orders the murder of his critics. Voltaire described the play as "written in opposition to the founder of a false and barbarous sect."

Voltaire described Muhammad as an "impostor", a "false prophet", a "fanatic" and a "hypocrite". Defending the play, he said that he "tried to show in it into what horrible excesses fanaticism, led by an impostor, can plunge weak minds". When Voltaire wrote in 1742 to César de Missy, he described Muhammad as deceitful.

In his play, Muhammad is "whatever trickery can invent that is most atrocious and whatever fanaticism can accomplish that is most horrifying. Mahomet here is nothing other than Tartuffe with armies at his command." After later having judged that he had made Muhammad in his play "somewhat nastier than he really was", Voltaire claimed that Muhammad stole the idea of an angel weighing both men and women from Zoroastrians, who are often referred to as "Magi". Voltaire continued about Islam, saying:

Nothing is more terrible than a people who, having nothing to lose, fight in the united spirit of rapine and of religion.

In a 1745 letter recommending the play to Pope Benedict XIV, Voltaire described Muhammad as "the founder of a false and barbarous sect" and "a false prophet". Voltaire wrote: "Your holiness will pardon the liberty taken by one of the lowest of the faithful, though a zealous admirer of virtue, of submitting to the head of the true religion this performance, written in opposition to the founder of a false and barbarous sect. To whom could I with more propriety inscribe a satire on the cruelty and errors of a false prophet, than to the vicar and representative of a God of truth and mercy?" His view was modified slightly for Essai sur les Moeurs et l'Esprit des Nations, although it remained negative. In 1751, Voltaire performed his play Mohamet once again, with great success.

=== Hinduism ===
In 1760, Voltaire received the book Ezourvedam for learning the "true meaning" of the Hindu Vedas. However, by 1761, Voltaire treated Ezourvedam to be a mere commentary on the Vedas.

Voltaire, a supporter of animal rights and a vegetarian, used the antiquity of Hinduism to land what he saw as a devastating blow to the Bible's claims and acknowledged that the Hindus' treatment of animals showed a shaming alternative to the immorality of European imperialists. He regarded Hindus as "a peaceful and innocent people, equally incapable of hurting others or of defending themselves."

Voltaire received another text, Cormovedam, which he regarded as a summary of opinions and rites found in the Vedas. He cited this text mainly for showing how the Brahmins and the Vedas had degenerated. He described it thus in 1761: "[T]heir [i.e., the Brahmins'] ritual, is a bunch of superstitious ceremonies that make anybody who is not born on the banks of the Ganges or Indus laugh—or rather, anyone who, not being a philosophe, is surprised about the stupidities of other peoples and not amazed at those of his own country".

=== Confucianism ===
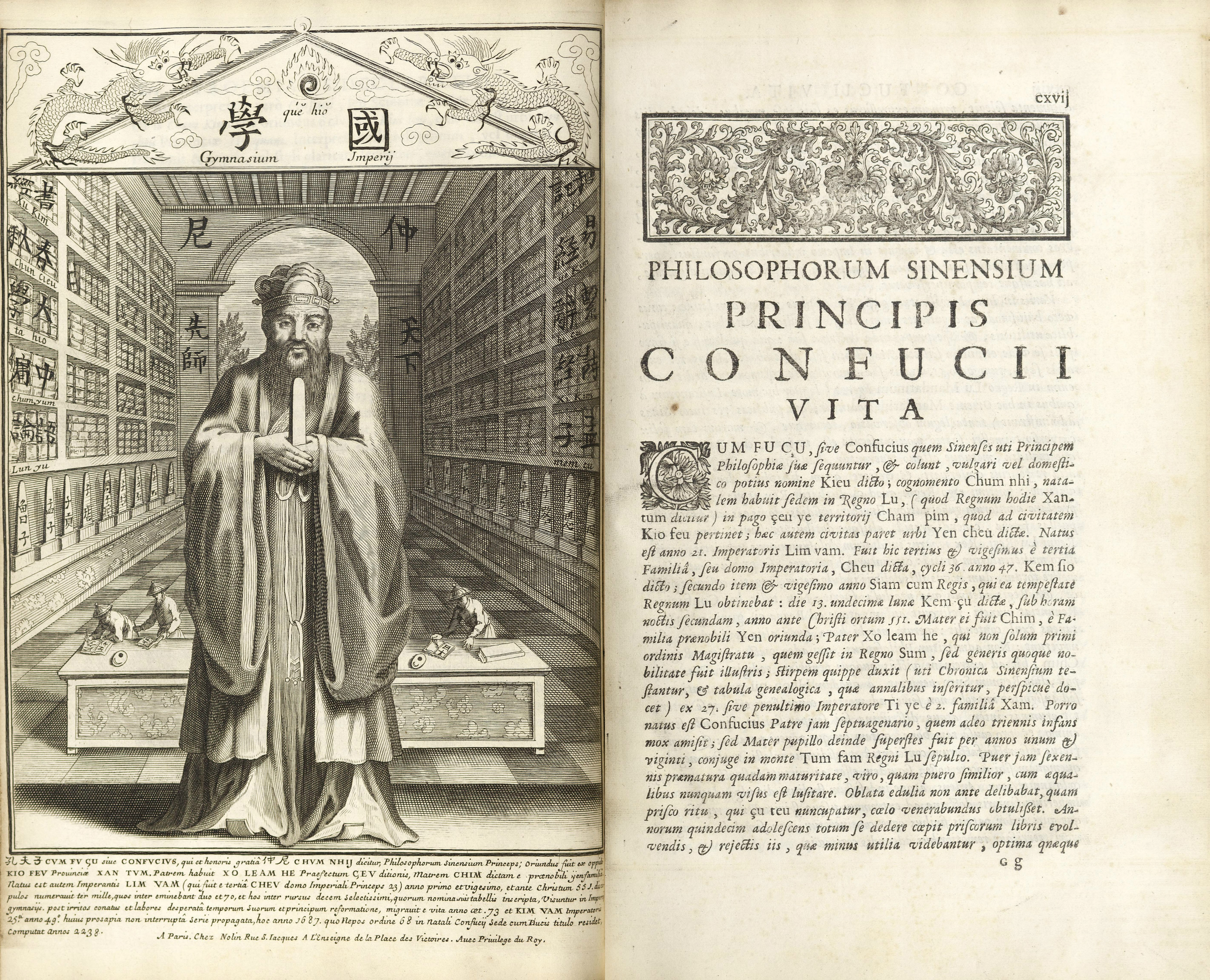
Life and Works of Confucius, by Prospero Intorcetta, 1687

Works attributed to Confucius were translated into European languages through the agency of Jesuit missionaries stationed in China. (Note: The first was Michele Ruggieri, who had returned from China to Italy in 1588 and carried on translating in Latin the Chinese classics while residing in Salerno.) Matteo Ricci was among the earliest to report on the teachings of Confucius, and father Prospero Intorcetta wrote about the life and works of Confucius in Latin in 1687.

Translations of Confucian texts influenced European thinkers of the period, particularly among the Deists and other philosophical groups of the Enlightenment who hoped to improve European morals and institutions by the serene doctrines of the East. Voltaire shared these hopes, seeing Confucian rationalism as an alternative to Christian dogma. He praised Confucian ethics and politics, portraying the sociopolitical hierarchy of China as a model for Europe.

Confucius has no interest in falsehood; he did not pretend to be prophet; he claimed no inspiration; he taught no new religion; he used no delusions; flattered not the emperor under whom he lived...

— Voltaire

With the translation of Confucian texts during the Enlightenment, the concept of a meritocracy reached intellectuals in the West, who saw it as an alternative to the traditional Ancien Régime of Europe. Voltaire wrote favourably of the idea, claiming that the Chinese had "perfected moral science" and advocating an economic and political system after the Chinese model.

=== Views on race and slavery ===
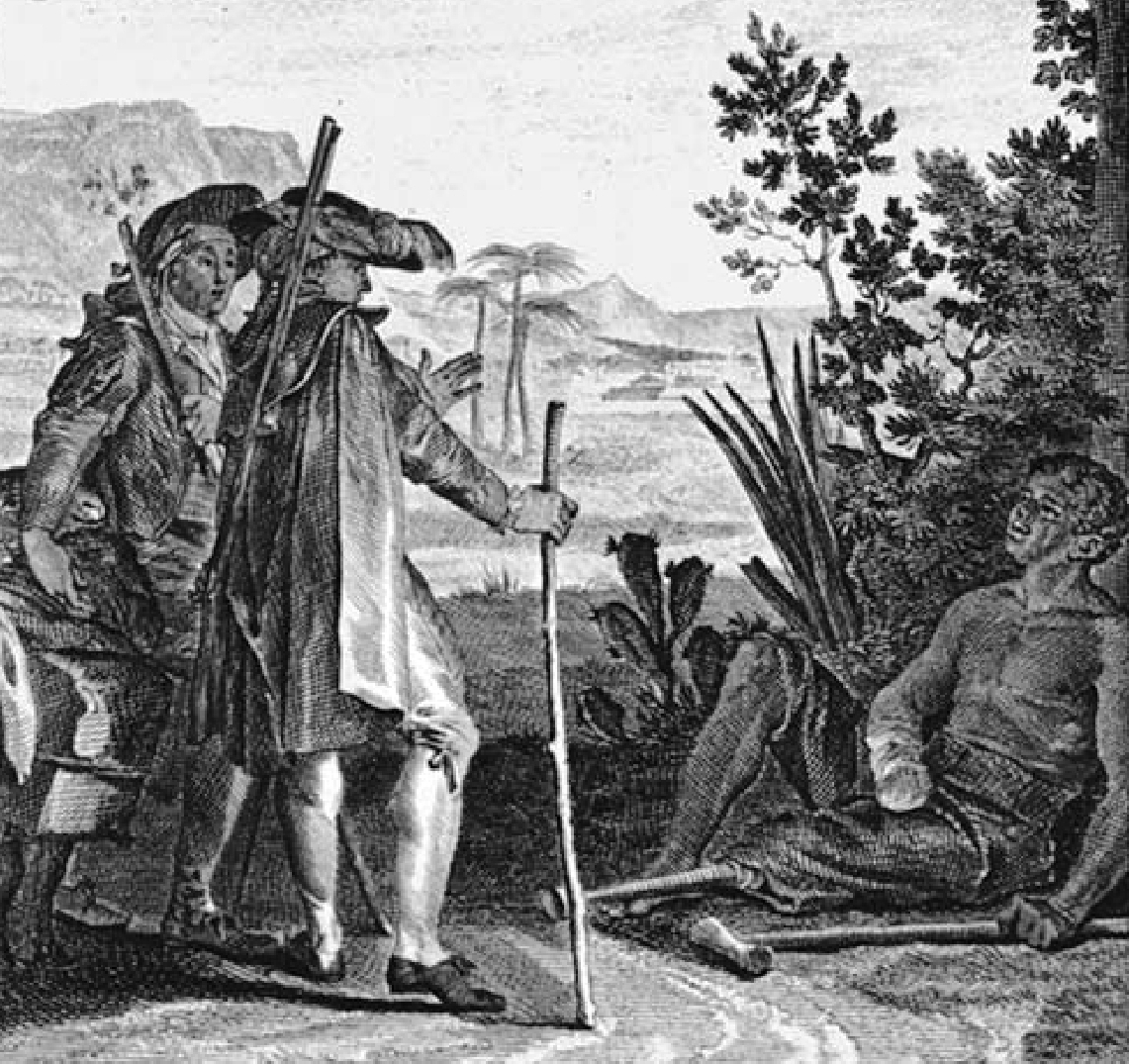
An illustration of a scene from Candide where the protagonist encounters a slave in French Guiana

Voltaire rejected the biblical Adam and Eve story and was a polygenist who speculated that each race had entirely separate origins. According to William Cohen, like most other polygenists, Voltaire believed that because of their different origins, Black Africans did not entirely share the natural humanity of white Europeans. According to David Allen Harvey, Voltaire often invoked racial differences as a means to attack religious orthodoxy, and the Biblical account of creation. Other historians, instead, have suggested that Voltaire's support for polygenism was more heavily encouraged by his investments in the French Compagnie des Indes and other colonial enterprises that engaged in the slave trade.

His most famous remark on slavery is found in Candide, where the hero is horrified to learn "at what price we eat sugar in Europe" after coming across a slave in French Guiana who has been mutilated for escaping, who opines that, if all human beings have common origins as the Bible taught, it makes them cousins, concluding that "no one could treat their relatives more horribly". Elsewhere, he wrote caustically about "whites and Christians [who] proceed to purchase negroes cheaply, in order to sell them dear in America". A letter attributed to him has been cited as evidence that Voltaire supported the slave trade, although it has been suggested that this letter is a forgery "since no satisfying source attests to the letter's existence".

In his Philosophical Dictionary, Voltaire endorses Montesquieu's criticism of the slave trade: "Montesquieu was almost always in error with the learned, because he was not learned, but he was almost always right against the fanatics and the promoters of slavery."

Zeev Sternhell argues that despite his shortcomings, Voltaire was a forerunner of liberal pluralism in his approach to history and non-European cultures. Voltaire wrote, "We have slandered the Chinese because their metaphysics is not the same as ours ... This great misunderstanding about Chinese rituals has come about because we have judged their usages by ours, for we carry the prejudices of our contentious spirit to the end of the world." In speaking of Persia, he condemned Europe's "ignorant audacity" and "ignorant credulity". When writing about India, he declares, "It is time for us to give up the shameful habit of slandering all sects and insulting all nations!" In Essai sur les mœurs et l'esprit des nations, he defended the integrity of the Native Americans and wrote favorably of the Inca Empire.

== Legacy ==
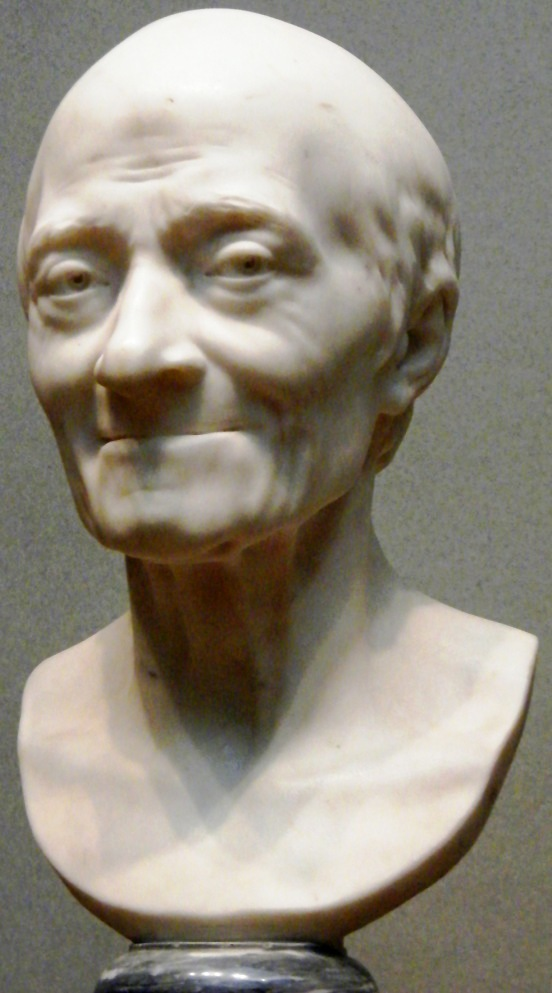
Voltaire, by Jean-Antoine Houdon, 1778 (National Gallery of Art)

Voltaire perceived the French bourgeoisie to be too small and ineffective, the aristocracy to be parasitic and corrupt, the commoners as ignorant and superstitious, and the Church as a static and oppressive force useful only on occasion as a counterbalance to the rapacity of kings, although all too often, even more rapacious itself. Voltaire distrusted democracy, which he saw as propagating the idiocy of the masses. Voltaire long thought only an enlightened monarch could bring about change, given the social structures of the time and the extremely high rates of illiteracy, and that it was in the king's rational interest to improve the education and welfare of his subjects.

His disappointments and disillusions with Frederick the Great changed his philosophy somewhat, and soon gave birth to one of his most enduring works, his novella Candide, ou l'Optimisme (Candide, or Optimism, 1759), which ends with a new conclusion of quietism: "It is up to us to cultivate our garden." His most polemical and ferocious attacks on intolerance and religious persecutions indeed began to appear a few years later. Candide was also burned, and Voltaire jokingly claimed the actual author was a certain 'Demad' in a letter, where he reaffirmed the main polemical stances of the text.

He is remembered and honored in France as a courageous polemicist who indefatigably fought for civil rights (such as the right to a fair trial and freedom of religion) and who denounced the hypocrisies and injustices of the Ancien Régime. The Ancien Régime involved an unfair balance of power and taxes between the three Estates: clergy and nobles on one side, the commoners and middle class, who were burdened with most of the taxes, on the other. He particularly had admiration for the ethics and government as exemplified by the Chinese philosopher Confucius.

Voltaire is also known for many memorable aphorisms, such as "Si Dieu n'existait pas, il faudrait l'inventer" ("If God did not exist, it would be necessary to invent him"), contained in a verse epistle from 1768, addressed to the anonymous author of a controversial work on The Three Impostors. But far from being the cynical remark it is often taken for, it was meant as a retort to atheistic opponents such as d'Holbach, Grimm, and others.

He has had his detractors among his later colleagues. The Scottish Victorian writer Thomas Carlyle argued that "Voltaire read history, not with the eye of devout seer or even critic, but through a pair of mere anti-catholic spectacles."

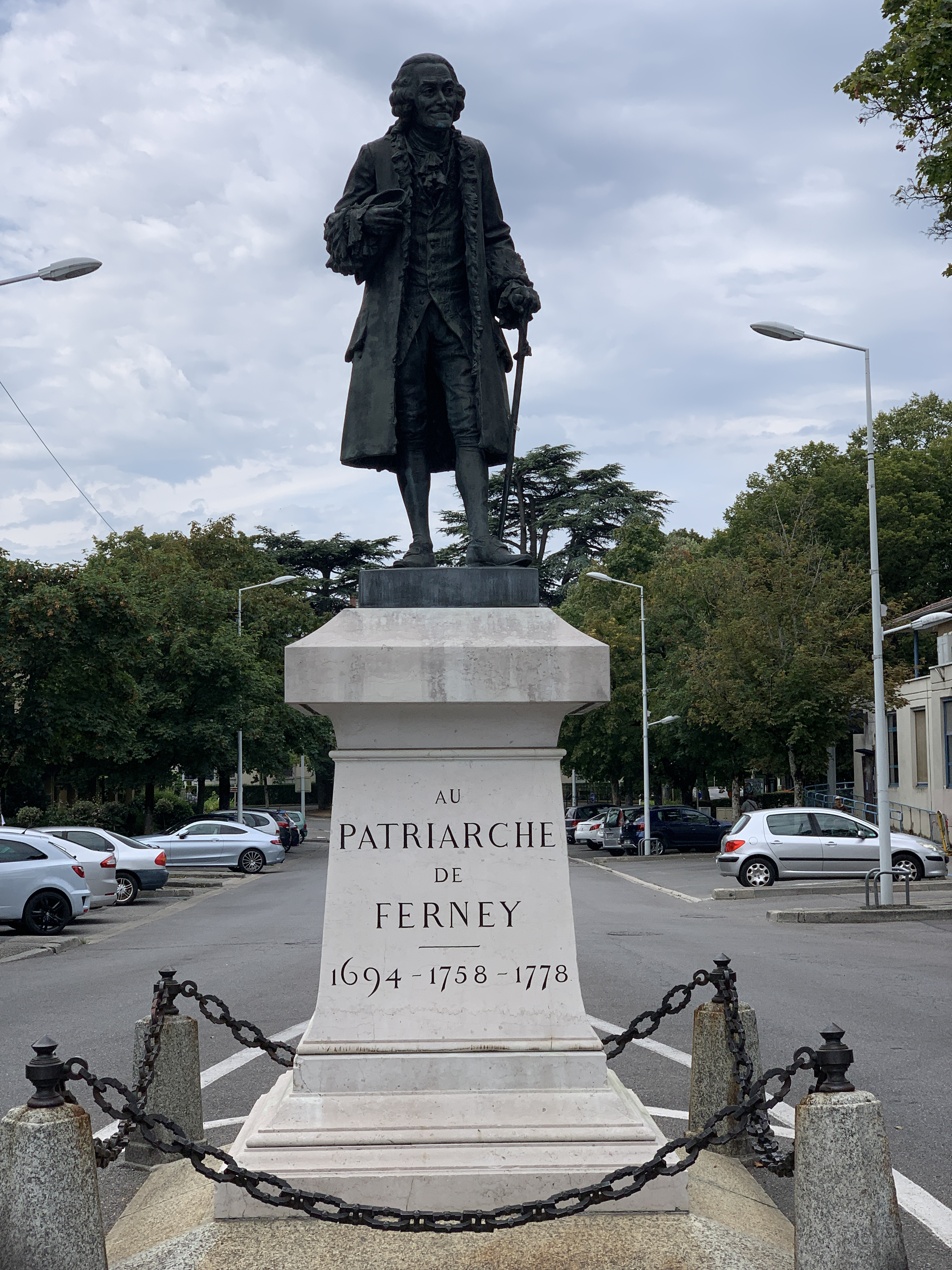
Statue of Voltaire in Ferney

The town of Ferney, where Voltaire lived out the last 20 years of his life, was officially named Ferney-Voltaire in honor of its most famous resident, in 1878. His château is a museum. Voltaire's library is preserved intact in the National Library of Russia at Saint Petersburg. In the Zürich of 1916, the theatre and performance group who would become the early avant-garde Dada movement named their theater the Cabaret Voltaire. A late-20th-century industrial music group later adopted the same name. Astronomers have bestowed his name on the Voltaire crater on Deimos and the asteroid 5676 Voltaire.

Voltaire was also known to have been an advocate for coffee, drinking it at every turn: fifty times a day, according to Frederick the Great; three times a day, said Wagniere. It has been suggested that high amounts of caffeine stimulated his creativity. His great-grandniece was the mother of Pierre Teilhard de Chardin, a Catholic philosopher and Jesuit priest. His book Candide was listed as one of The 100 Most Influential Books Ever Written, by Martin Seymour-Smith.

In the 1950s, the bibliographer and translator Theodore Besterman started to collect, transcribe and publish all of Voltaire's writings. He founded the Voltaire Institute and Museum in Geneva where he began publishing collected volumes of Voltaire's correspondence. On his death in 1976, he left his collection to the University of Oxford, where the Voltaire Foundation became established as a department. The Foundation has published the Complete Works of Voltaire, a chronological series in 205 volumes completed in 2022, more than fifty years after the first volume appeared. It also publishes the series Oxford University Studies in the Enlightenment, begun by Bestermann as Studies on Voltaire and the Eighteenth Century, which has reached more than 500 volumes.

=== Appreciation and influence ===
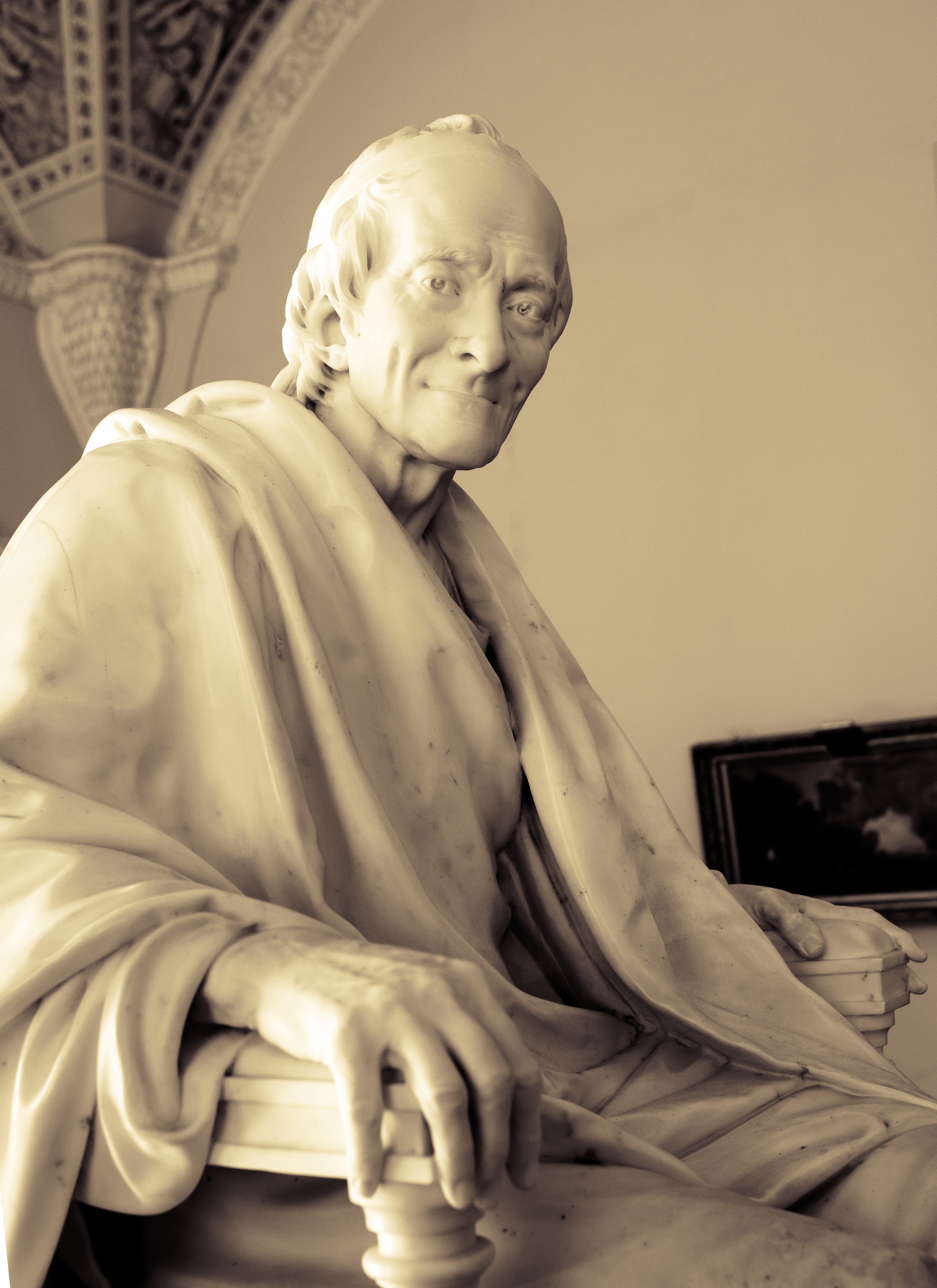
Statue of Voltaire, made in 1781 by Houdon at the order of Catherine the Great

According to Victor Hugo: "To name Voltaire is to characterize the entire eighteenth century." Goethe regarded Voltaire as the greatest literary figure of modern times, and possibly of all time. According to Diderot, Voltaire's influence would extend far into the future. (Note: Diderot, in a letter to E.M. Falconet, dated 15 February 1766: Pile assumptions on assumptions; accumulate wars on wars; make interminable disturbances succeed to interminable disturbances; let the universe be inundated by a general spirit of confusion; and it would take a hundred thousand years for the works and the name of Voltaire to be lost.) Napoleon commented that till he was sixteen he "would have fought for Rousseau against the friends of Voltaire, today it is the opposite ... The more I read Voltaire the more I love him. He is a man always reasonable, never a charlatan, never a fanatic", though he later criticized Voltaire's work Mahomet during his captivity on Saint Helena.

Frederick the Great commented on his good fortune for having lived in the age of Voltaire, and corresponded with him throughout his reign until Voltaire's death. On 12 May 1760, Frederick wrote: "For my part I shall go to Hades and tell Virgil that a Frenchman has surpassed him in his own art. I shall say as much to Sophocles and Euripides; I shall speak to Thucydides of your histories, to Quintus Curtius of your Charles XII; and perhaps I shall be stoned by these jealous dead because a single man has united all their different merits in himself." In England, Voltaire's views influenced Godwin, Paine, Mary Wollstonecraft, Bentham, Byron and Shelley. Macaulay made note of the fear that Voltaire's very name incited in tyrants and fanatics. (Note: Macaulay, in his essay on Frederick the Great: In truth, of all the intellectual weapons that have been wielded by man, the most terrible was the mockery of Voltaire. Bigots and tyrants, who had never been moved by the wailings and cursing of millions, turned pale at his name.)

In Russia, Catherine the Great had been reading Voltaire for sixteen years prior to becoming Empress in 1762. In October 1763, she began a correspondence with the philosopher that continued till his death. The content of these letters has been described as being akin to a student writing to a teacher. Upon Voltaire's death, the Empress purchased his library, which was then transported and placed in The Hermitage. Alexander Herzen remarked that "The writings of the egoist Voltaire did more for liberation than those of the loving Rousseau did for brotherhood." In his famous letter to N. V. Gogol, Vissarion Belinsky wrote that Voltaire "stamped out the fires of fanaticism and ignorance in Europe by ridicule."

In his native Paris, Voltaire was remembered as the defender of Jean Calas and Pierre Sirven. Although Voltaire's campaign had failed to secure the annulment of la Barre's execution for blasphemy against Christianity, the criminal code that sanctioned the execution was revised during Voltaire's lifetime.

In 1764, Voltaire successfully intervened and secured the release of Claude Chamont, arrested for attending Protestant services. When Comte de Lally was executed for treason in 1766, Voltaire wrote a 300-page document in his defense. Subsequently, in 1778, the judgment against de Lally was expunged just before Voltaire's death. The Genevan Protestant minister Pomaret once said to Voltaire, "You seem to attack Christianity, and yet you do the work of a Christian." Frederick the Great noted the significance of a philosopher capable of influencing judges to change their unjust decisions, commenting that this alone is sufficient to ensure the prominence of Voltaire as a humanitarian.

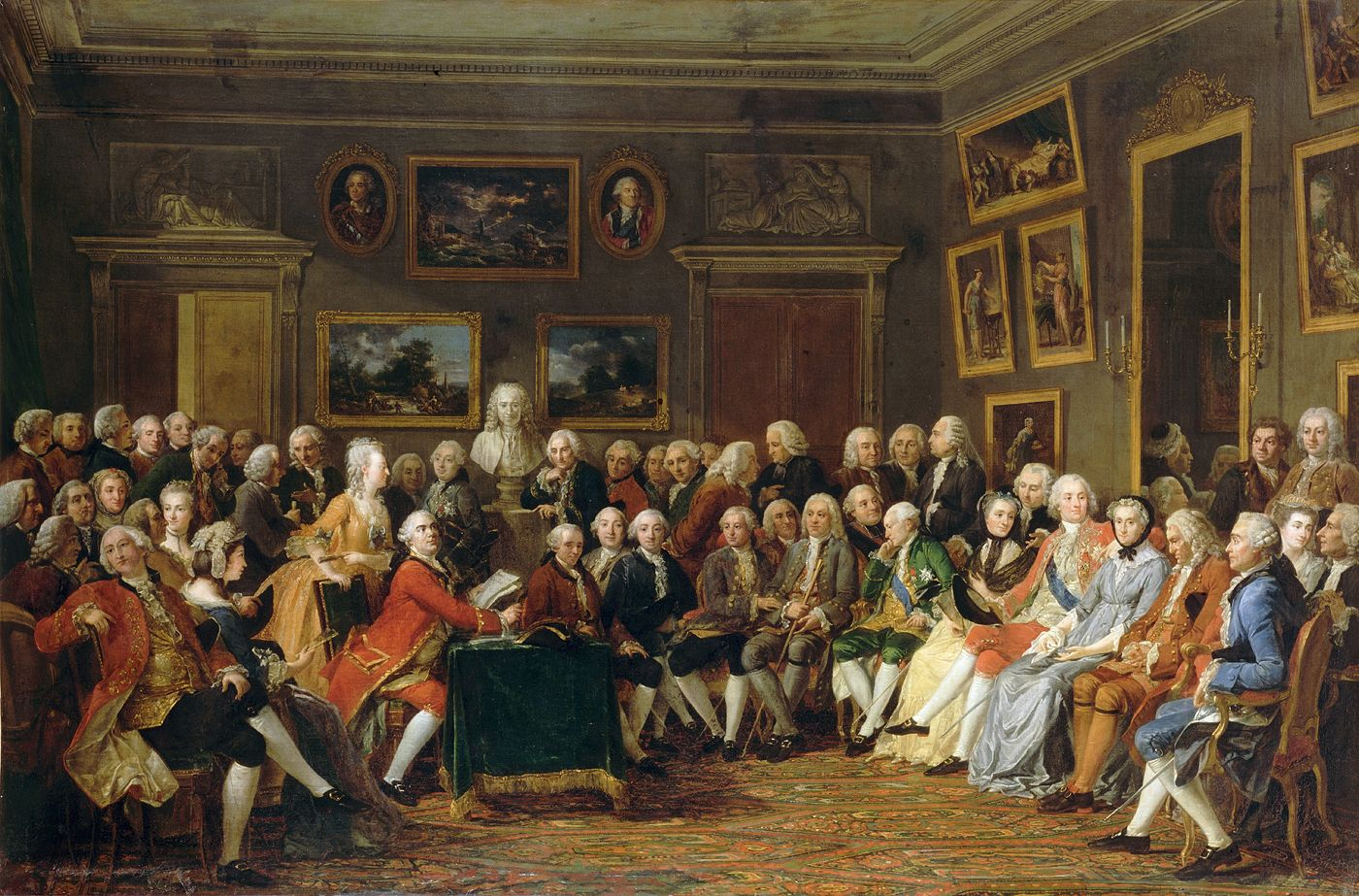
In the Salon of Madame Geoffrin in 1755 by Anicet Charles Gabriel Lemonnier, 1812. A reading of a work by Voltaire in the salon of Madame Geoffrin

Under the French Third Republic, anarchists and socialists often invoked Voltaire's writings in their struggles against militarism, nationalism, and the Catholic Church. The section condemning the futility and imbecility of war in the Dictionnaire philosophique was a frequent favorite, as were his arguments that nations can only grow at the expense of others. Following the liberation of France from the Vichy regime in 1944, Voltaire's 250th birthday was celebrated in both France and the Soviet Union, honoring him as "one of the most feared opponents" of the Nazi collaborators and someone "whose name symbolizes freedom of thought, and hatred of prejudice, superstition, and injustice."

Jorge Luis Borges stated that "not to admire Voltaire is one of the many forms of stupidity" and included his short fiction such as Micromégas in "The Library of Babel" and "A Personal Library." Gustave Flaubert believed that France had erred gravely by following the path forged by Rousseau instead of that of Voltaire. Most architects of modern America were adherents of Voltaire's views. According to Will Durant:

Italy had a Renaissance, and Germany had a Reformation, but France had Voltaire; he was for his country both Renaissance and Reformation, and half the Revolution. He was first and best in his time in his conception and writing of history, in the grace of his poetry, in the charm and wit of his prose, in the range of his thought and his influence. His spirit moved like a flame over the continent and the century, and stirs a million souls in every generation.

== Relationship with Rousseau ==
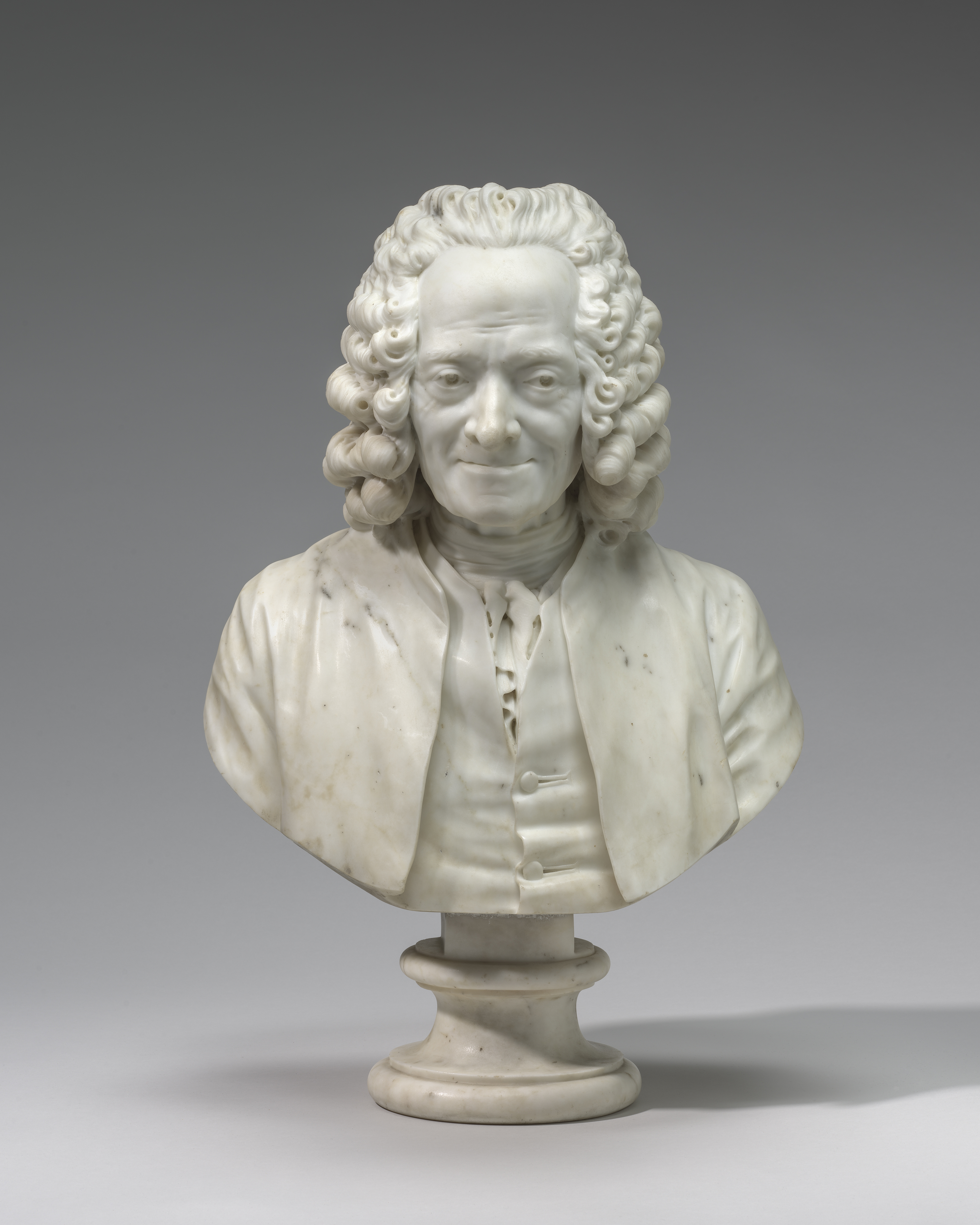
Jean-Antoine Houdon, Voltaire, 1778, National Gallery of Art

Voltaire's junior contemporary Jean-Jacques Rousseau commented on how Voltaire's book Letters on the English played a great role in his intellectual development. Having written some literary works and also some music, in December 1745 Rousseau wrote a letter introducing himself to Voltaire, who was by then the most prominent literary figure in France, to which Voltaire replied with a polite response. Subsequently, when Rousseau sent Voltaire a copy of his book Discourse on Inequality, Voltaire replied, noting his disagreement with the views expressed in the book:

No one has ever employed so much intellect to persuade men to be beasts. In reading your work one is seized with a desire to walk on all fours [marcher à quatre pattes]. However, as it is more than sixty years since I lost that habit, I feel, unfortunately, that it is impossible for me to resume it.

Subsequently, commenting on Rousseau's romantic novel Julie, or the New Heloise, Voltaire stated:

No more about Jean-Jacques' romance if you please. I have read it, to my sorrow, and it would be to his if I had time to say what I think of this silly book.

Voltaire quipped that the first half of Julie had been written in a brothel and the second half in a lunatic asylum. In his Lettres sur La Nouvelle Heloise, written under a pseudonym, Voltaire criticized Rousseau's grammatical mistakes:

Paris recognized Voltaire's hand and judged the patriarch to be bitten by jealousy.

In reviewing Rousseau's book Emile, Voltaire dismissed it as "a hodgepodge of a silly wet nurse in four volumes, with forty pages against Christianity, among the boldest ever known." He expressed admiration for the section titled Profession of Faith of the Savoyard Vicar, calling it "fifty good pages ... it is regrettable that they should have been written by ... such a knave." He went on to predict that Emile would be forgotten within a month.

In 1764, Rousseau published Lettres de la montagne on religion and politics. In the fifth letter he wondered why Voltaire had not been able to imbue the Genevan councilors, who frequently met him, "with that spirit of tolerance which he preaches without cease, and of which he sometimes has need". The letter continued with an imaginary speech in the voice of Voltaire, acknowledging authorship of the heretical book Sermon of the Fifty, which the real Voltaire had repeatedly denied.

In 1772, when a priest sent Rousseau a pamphlet denouncing Voltaire, Rousseau responded by defending his rival:

He has said and done so many good things that we should draw the curtain over his irregularities.

In 1778, when Voltaire was given unprecedented honors at the Théâtre-Français, an acquaintance of Rousseau ridiculed the event. This was met by a sharp retort from Rousseau:

How dare you mock the honors rendered to Voltaire in the temple of which he is the god, and by the priests who for fifty years have been living off his masterpieces?

On 2 July 1778, Rousseau died one month after Voltaire. In October 1794, Rousseau's remains were moved to the Panthéon near the remains of Voltaire. (Note: "From that haven of neighborly peace their spirits rose to renew their war for the soul of the Revolution, of France, and of Western man", writes Will Durant.)

Louis XVI, while incarcerated in the Temple, lamented that Rousseau and Voltaire had "destroyed France". (Note: In a celebrated letter, dated 2 April 1764, Voltaire had predicted the future occurrence of the French Revolution, characterizing it as "a splendid outburst." Will Durant commented: Yet...he never for a moment supposed that in this "splendid outburst" all France would accept enthusiastically the philosophy of this queer Jean-Jacques Rousseau who, from Geneva and Paris, was thrilling the world with sentimental romances and revolutionary pamphlets. The complex soul of France seemed to have divided itself into these two men, so different and yet so French. Nietzsche speaks of "la gaya scienza, the light feet, wit, fire, grace, strong logic, arrogant intellectuality, the dance of the stars"—surely he was thinking of Voltaire. Now beside Voltaire put Rousseau: all heat and fantasy, a man with noble and jejune visions, the idol of la bourgeois gentile-femme, announcing like Pascal that the heart has its reason which the head can never understand.)

== Works ==
=== Non-fiction ===
- Letters on the Quakers (1727)
- Letters concerning the English nation (London, 1733) (French version entitled Lettres philosophiques sur les Anglais, Rouen, 1734), revised as Letters on the English (c. 1778)
- Sept Discours en Vers sur l'Homme (1738)
- The Elements of Sir Isaac Newton's Philosophy (1738; 2nd expanded ed. 1745)
- Dictionnaire philosophique (1752)
- The Sermon of the Fifty (1759)
- The Calas Affair: A Treatise on Tolerance (1762)
- Treatise on Tolerance (1763)
- Ce qui plaît aux dames (1764)
- Idées républicaines (1765)
- La Philosophie de l'histoire (1765)
- Questions sur les Miracles (1765)
- Des singularités de la nature (1768)
- Questions sur l'Encyclopédie (1770–1774)
- Les Dialogues d'Evhémère (1777)

==== History ====
- History of Charles XII, King of Sweden (1731)
- The Age of Louis XIV (1751)
- The Age of Louis XV (1746–1752; published separately 1768)
- Annals of the Empire – Charlemagne, AD 742 – Henry VII 1313, Vol. I (1754)
- Annals of the Empire – Louis of Bavaria, 1315 to Ferdinand II 1631 Vol. II (1754)
- Essay on Universal History, the Manners, and Spirit of Nations (1756)
- History of the Russian Empire Under Peter the Great (Vol. I 1759; Vol. II 1763)

=== Novellas ===
- The One-eyed Street Porter, Cosi-sancta (1715)
- Micromégas (1738)
- Zadig, or Destiny (1747)
- The World as It Goes (1750)
- Memnon (1750)
- Bababec and the Fakirs (1750)
- Timon (1755)
- Plato's Dream (1756)
- The Travels of Scarmentado (1756)
- The Two Consoled Ones (1756)
- Candide, or Optimism (1759)
- Story of a Good Brahman (1759)
- The City of Cashmere (1760)
- The King of Boutan (1761)
- An Indian Adventure (1764)
- The White and the Black (1764)
- Jeannot and Colin (1764)
- The Blind Judges of Colors (1766)
- The Huron, or Pupil of Nature (1767)
- The Princess of Babylon (1768)
- The Man of Forty Crowns (1768)
- The Letters of Amabed (1769)
- The White Bull (1773–74)
- An Incident of Memory (1773)
- The History of Jenni (1774)
- The Travels of Reason (1774)
- The Ears of Lord Chesterfield and Chaplain Goudman (1775)

=== Plays ===
Voltaire wrote between fifty and sixty plays (tragedies), including a few unfinished ones. Among them are:

- Œdipe (1717)
- Artémire (1720)
- Mariamne (1724)
- Brutus (1730)
- Éryphile (1732)
- Zaïre (1732), inspiration for Zaira, opera by Vincenzo Bellini (1829)
- Alzire, ou les Américains (1736), inspiration for Alzira, opera by Giuseppe Verdi (1845)
- Zulima (1740)
- Mahomet (1741)
- Mérope (1743)
- La princesse de Navarre (1745)
- Sémiramis (1748), inspiration for Semiramide, opera by Gioachino Rossini (1823)
- Nanine (1749)

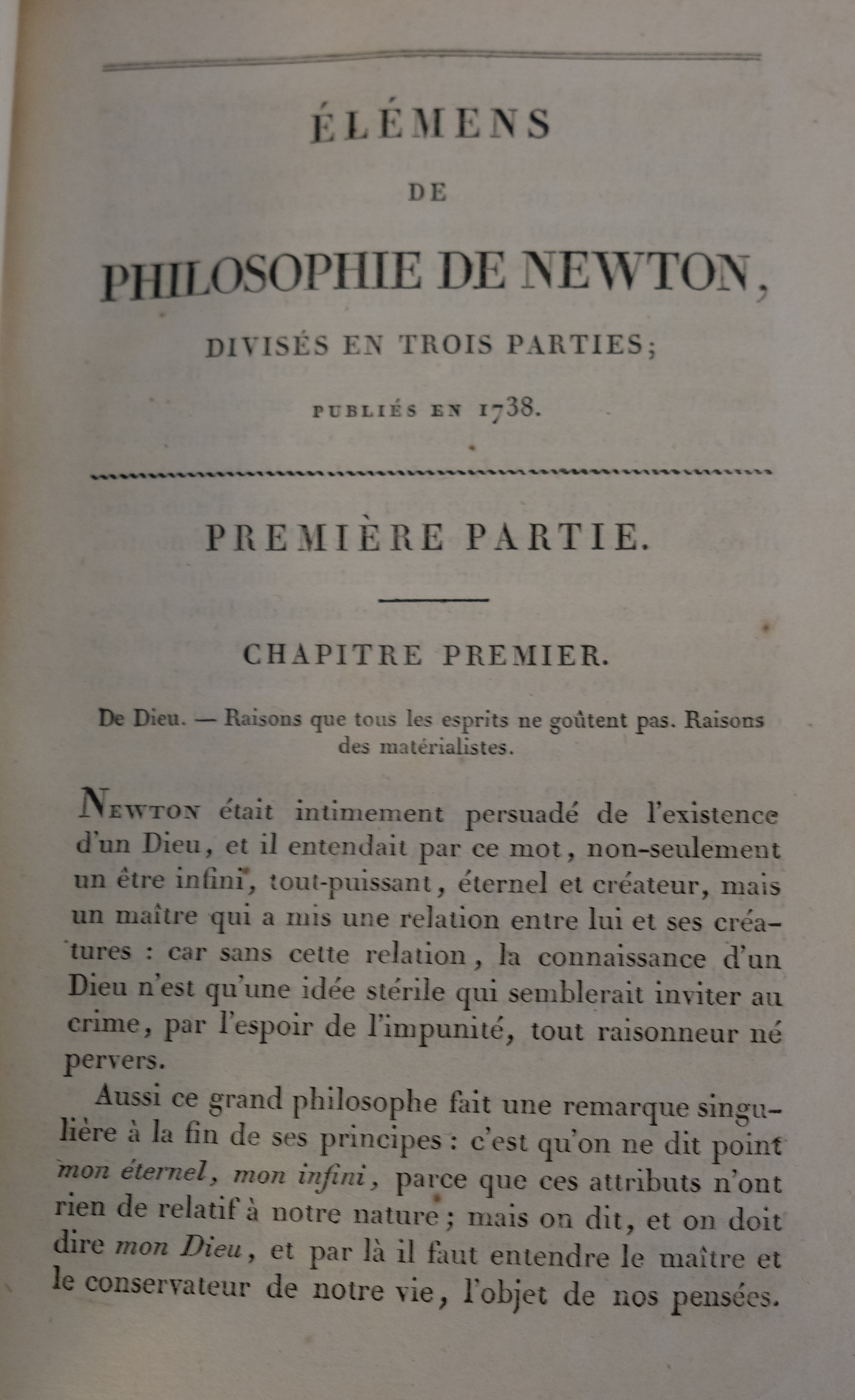
First page of volume 19 of Œuvres complètes de Voltaire. Nouvelle édition (1818)

- L'Orphelin de la Chine (1755) (Note: This is an adaptation of the famous Chinese play The Orphan of Zhao, based on historical events in the Spring and Autumn period.)
- Socrate (published 1759)
- La Femme qui a Raison (1759)
- Tancrède (1760), inspiration for Tancredi, opera by Gioachino Rossini (1813)
- Le Triumvirat (1764)
- Don Pèdre, roi de Castille (1774)
- Sophonisbe (1774)
- Irène (1778)
- Agathocle (1779)

=== Poetry ===
- Henriade (1723)
- The Maid of Orleans (c. 1730, edited and republished 1762)
- Le Mondain (1736)
- Poème sur le désastre de Lisbonne (1755–1756)
- Épître à l'Auteur du Livre des Trois Imposteurs (1770)

=== Collected works ===
- Œuvres complètes de Voltaire, A. Beuchot (ed.). 72 vols. (1829–1840)
- Œuvres complètes de Voltaire, Louis E.D. Moland and G. Bengesco (eds.). 52 vols. (1877–1885)
- Œuvres complètes de Voltaire, Theodore Besterman, et al. (eds.). 144 vols. (1968–2018)

== See also ==
- Boulevard Voltaire
- List of liberal theorists
- Mononymous persons
- Voltaire Human Rights Awards, Australia
- Voltaire Foundation
- Voltaire Prize for Tolerance, International Understanding and Respect for Differences, University of Potsdam, Germany
