= Les Dialogues d'Evhémère =

1777 philosophical dialogue by Voltaire

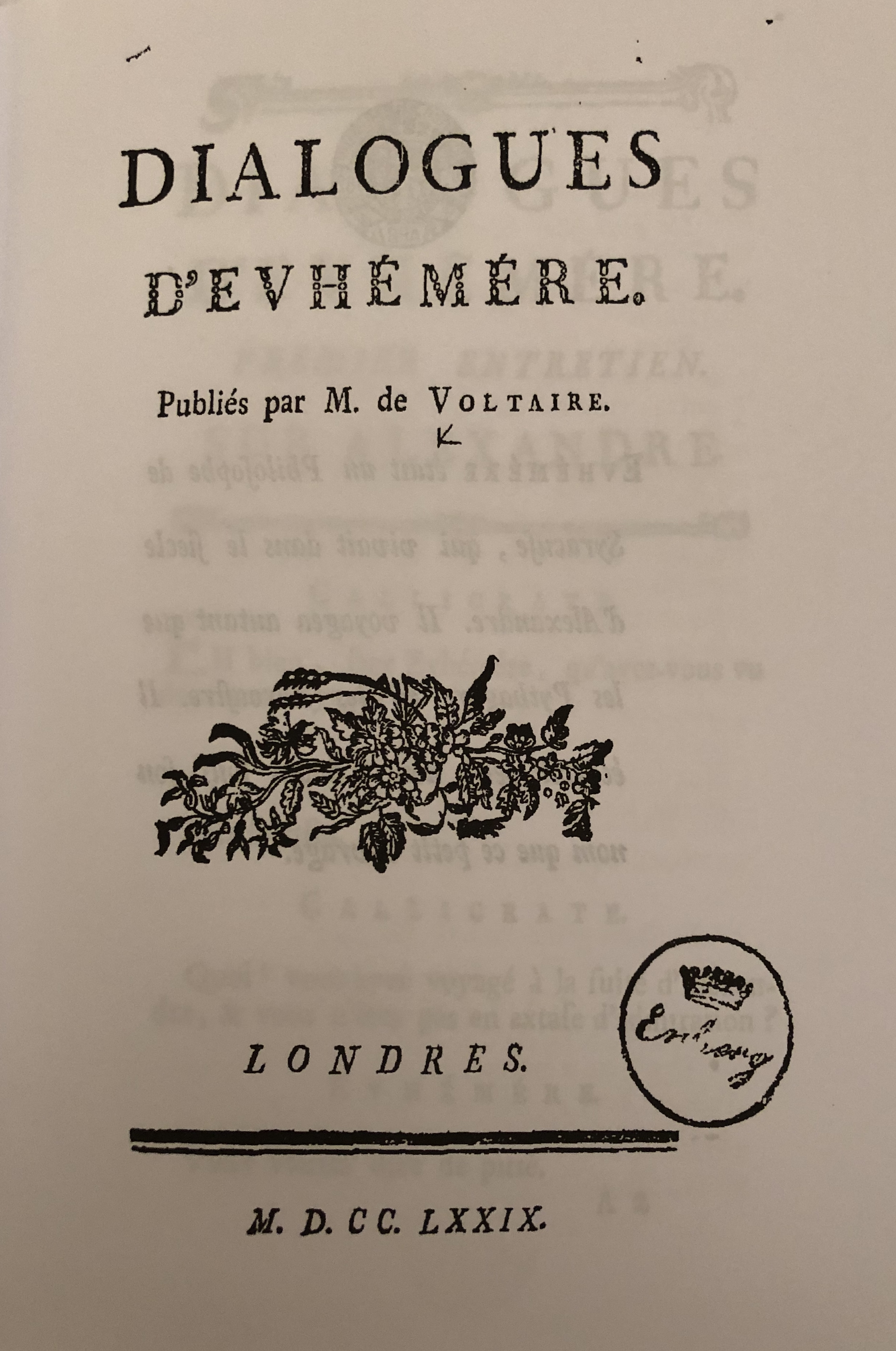
Frontispiece of the 1779 edition of Voltaire's ‘Dialogues d’Evhémère’

Les Dialogues d’Evhémère (The Dialogues of Euhemerus) is a little-known philosophical dialogue by Voltaire, published in 1777. At the time of its writing he was 83 years old and knew that he was coming to the end of his life: the work is a kind of philosophical testament. Like many other works by Voltaire, it is written in the tradition of Socratic dialogue, where the interlocutors seek the truth together.

== Arguments ==
The imagined dialogue takes place between two historical figures, Euhemerus and Callicrates. Euhemerus, a Stoic, was a contemporary of Alexander the Great, remembered mostly for his view that the Classical Greek gods had originally been people, deified long after their deaths by their followers. Callicrates was also a philosopher, from the third century BC, of whom little is known but whom Voltaire makes an Epicurean. His views, including atheism, are meant to represent the views of Voltaire's contemporaries Holbach, La Mettrie and Diderot.

In the dialogue as in historic reality Euhemeros had enjoyed a life of travel, much of it following Alexander; Callicrates is curious to know what his friend has learned as a result of these experiences. The conversations that follow are set out in twelve dialogues:

- First dialogue - on Alexander the Great.
- Second dialogue - on the Divinity.
- Third dialogue - on the philosophy of Epicurus and Greek theology.
- Fourth dialogue - on whether an active God would be more worthwhile than the gods of Epicurus, who do nothing.
- Fifth dialogue - poor people who dig in the abyss. Instinct, the basis for all animal action.
- Sixth dialogue - did Plato and Aristotle teach us about God and how the world was made?
- Seventh dialogue - on the philosophers who have flourished among the barbarians.
- Eighth dialogue - great discoveries by barbarian philosophers; the Greeks are no more than children compared to them.
- Ninth dialogue - on procreation.
- Tenth dialogue - on whether the earth was formed by a comet.
- Eleventh dialogue - on whether the mountains were formed by the sea.
- Twelfth dialogue - on the inventions of barbarians: new arts, new ideas.

There are two main themes in the dialogues. The first six consider metaphysical questions such as whether we have a soul, whether God exists and, if he does, who is responsible for all the misery on earth. And the last six dialogues are about natural philosophy and the material world - what we know about the cosmos, the earth, the creation of mountains, and the generation of new life. What all the dialogues have in common is an appeal for modesty and restraint in argument. There is little we can indubitably know and much is hidden from us. For this reason, whatever we may believe, we should never ignore evidence or assumptions from outside the universe of our beliefs; rather than proclaiming dogmas we should engage in dialogue. At the same time, Euhemerus is unsparing in his attacks on atheists, atomists and materialists as well as on religious dogma - all of which he terms 'madness, misery and crime'.

The dialogues offer an overview of Voltaire's life of thought. Euhemerus is effectively Voltaire's mouthpiece; he has seen the follies, delusions and misery of mankind. Much of the dialogue focuses on the paradox of God's goodness and the misery on earth. Euhemerus draws hope from scientific progress that points to a future world built on rationality. Eventually Callicrates decides to embark on a journey of his own to the barbarian lands from which his friend had learned so much.

== Censorship and the first edition ==
Voltaire's 94-page autographed manuscript still survives (pages 37–40 are not in his hand). However Voltaire's surviving correspondence makes no reference to the work, its development, or the ideas it elaborates. Likewise Grimm does not mention it. The Mémoires secrets from November 1777 did refer to the work however, and a comment from Jean-Louis Wagnière indicated that the Dialogues had been published only shortly before.

Over the course of his life Voltaire had had his works condemned or banned by royal censors in France on many occasions. He also had a number of ways of avoiding censorship - including arranging for his work to be printed outside France, and having it printed anonymously so he could deny authorship. Indeed, the presentation of challenging or radical ideas in the form of a dialogue was one method of bringing unconventional ideas to public attention while being less likely to have the word altered or suppressed.

The frontispiece of the first known edition of the Dialogues d'Evhémère indicates that it was published in London by Voltaire not in 1777 as suggested by the Mémoires secrets but in 1779 (i.e. the year after Voltaire's death), but does not name a publisher. In fact it is evident from the distinctive typography used that it was printed not in London but in Lausanne, by Abraham-Louis Tarin, who worked for the publisher François Grasset. Grasset is noted for having previously published a number of works attacking Voltaire as well as for having on several occasions clashed with him over the intended publication of Voltaire's works from unauthorised manuscript versions.
