= La Voltairomanie =

Polemical pamphlet against Voltaire

La Voltairomanie, ou lettre d’un jeune avocat
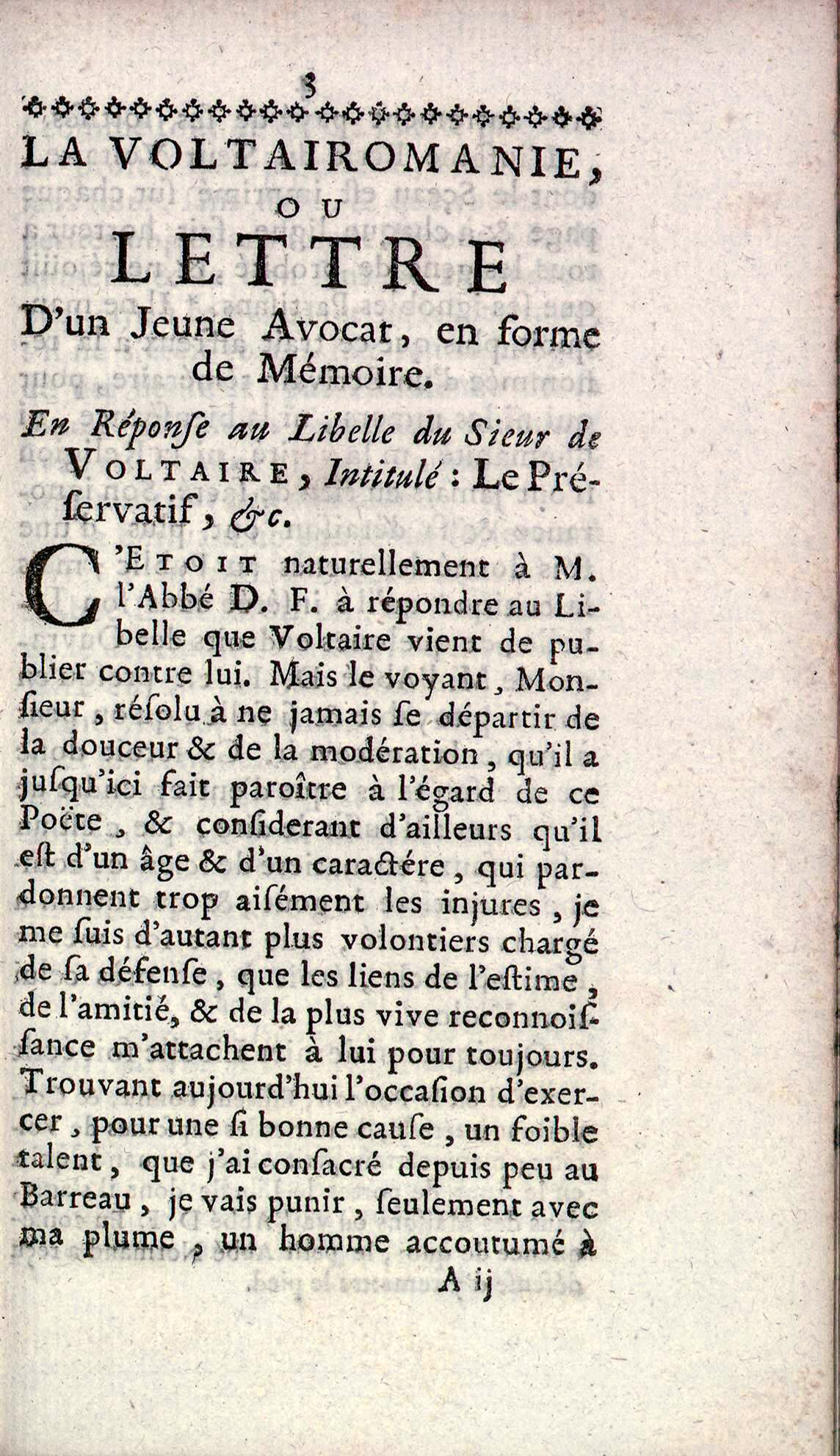
- Title page of the first edition (1738)
- Author: Abbé Desfontaines
- Original title: 'La Voltairomanie, ou lettre d’un jeune avocat'
- Language: French
- Subject: Polemic, literary criticism
- Genre: Pamphlet
- Publication date: 1738
- Publication place: France
- Media type: Print (octavo)

La Voltairomanie, ou lettre d’un jeune avocat (literally, Voltairmania, or Letter from a Young Lawyer) is a polemical pamphlet directed against Voltaire. It was first printed in Paris on 12 December 1738 and is attributed to the critic and journalist Abbé Desfontaines.

== Historical background ==
A long-standing grievance set Voltaire and Desfontaines against one another. Voltaire had obtained Desfontaines’s release from the prison-hospital of Bicêtre, where the abbé had been confined on charges of sodomy with under-age boys and girls. (Note: L’abbé Duval des Fontaines attire chez lui des jeunes gens pour les corrompre …François Ravaisson (1881). Archives de la Bastille. Vol. 12. Paris: A. Durand et Pedone-Lauriel. pp. 102–103.) Although Voltaire had known the abbé only a fortnight, he interceded first with d’Argenson to secure his freedom and then with Maurepas to lift an order banishing him to more than thirty leagues from Paris.

Desfontaines, however, did not feel indebted to Voltaire ad vitam aeternam. As a literary critic he claimed the right, in his periodical Observations sur les écrits modernes, to draw attention to the weaknesses in Voltaire’s works—criticisms to which the susceptible author reacted sharply.

When Voltaire’s Éléments de la philosophie de Newton appeared in 1738, Desfontaines at once criticised the abandonment of poetry for philosophy and Voltaire’s attempt to replace Cartesian rationalism with Newtonian empiricism. He then launched a spirited defence of Descartes and Malebranche against what he called the absurdity and impiety of Newton’s theories. A barbed aside—congratulating Voltaire for turning to philosophy at his “already advanced age”, with a malicious nod to the phrase turpe vates senex (“shameless old poet”) (Note: Voltaire was forty-four; Desfontaines was ten years older.)—infuriated Voltaire.

Stung, Voltaire fired back in November 1738 with Le Préservatif; Desfontaines replied within weeks with La Voltairomanie, ou Lettre d’un jeune avocat, en forme de mémoire en réponse au libelle du sieur de Voltaire, intitulé Le Préservatif.

== Publication and reception ==
La Voltairomanie is perhaps the most sustained personal attack Voltaire ever suffered. The anonymous pamphlet—anonymous so that Desfontaines could evade legal restrictions on what he might say under his own name—sold two thousand copies in its first fortnight.

When the work reached the château de Cirey, Voltaire was ill. Émilie tried to spare him, unaware that he had already hidden a copy from her just as she had tried to withhold hers from him. The libel overwhelmed him: he fainted twice, ran a fever and oscillated between fury and exhaustion.

In the opening weeks of 1739 the affair became an obsession. During January alone Voltaire wrote thirty-eight letters wholly or partly on the quarrel. He composed an Apologetic Memoir for d’Argenson, sued Desfontaines, pressed for his arrest by the Archbishop of Paris, and implored friends, actors and ministers—d’Aguesseau, Maurepas and others—for help: "I shall die or I shall have justice," he wrote in 1739. He even tried (unsuccessfully) to suppress the Observations sur les écrits modernes and to have Jean-Baptiste Rousseau—already banned from France—arrested.

At last the lieutenant-general of police, René Hérault, intervened. He compelled Desfontaines to sign a retraction of La Voltairomanie, and obliged Voltaire to do likewise for Le Préservatif—facilitated by the fact that neither text had carried a signature. Even so, Voltaire never missed an opportunity thereafter to denounce the abbé, whom he dubbed in his letters il buggerone abbate ("the buggering abbé").
