= Le Tonnelier =

Le Tonnelier, Tonnelier, or Tonnellier is a French occupational surname. It literally means "cooper" in French. Notable people with the surname include:

- Le Tonnelier de Breteuil
  - Achille Le Tonnelier de Breteuil
  - Claude Le Tonnelier de Breteuil
  - Gabrielle Émilie Le Tonnelier de Breteuil (1706–1749), mathematician, daughter of Louis Nicolas
  - Henri Le Tonnelier de Breteuil
  - François Victor Le Tonnelier de Breteuil (1686–1743), twice secretary of state for war
  - Louis Auguste Le Tonnelier de Breteuil (1730–1807), diplomat and politician
  - Louis Nicolas Le Tonnelier de Breteuil (1648–1728), officer of the household of Louis XIV
- David Tonnellier, Canadian curler
- Franz Tonnelier (1813–1881), Getrman landscape painter
- Hans-Joachim Tonnellier (born 1948), German banker
- Rodolphe Tonnellier (1887–1965), French politician
- Thierry Tonnelier (born1959) is a retired French middle-distance runner
