= Octave Hallauer =

French mechanical engineer (1842–1883)

- Octave-René Hallauer
- Born: 21 January 1842; Metz, France
- Died: 5 December 1883 (aged 41); Munster, then part of Alsace–Lorraine, German Empire
- Education: École professionnelle de Mulhouse
- Known for: Experimental studies of steam engine performance and thermodynamic losses; trials of compound engines
- Spouse: Jeanne Mathilde Verronnais (m. 1876)
- Awards: Honorary member, Société industrielle de Mulhouse; Honorary member, American Society of Mechanical Engineers
- Scientific career
- Fields: Mechanical engineering; thermodynamics
- Workplaces: Stehelin works, Bitschwiller-lès-Thann; Grafenstaden works, from 1868; Association des propriétaires d'appareils à vapeur; Hartmann firm, Munster, from 1875

Octave-René Hallauer (21 January 1842 – 5 December 1883) was a French mechanical engineer and researcher, active chiefly in Alsace. He is known for his experimental studies of the steam engine and for his analysis of the thermodynamic losses that limit engine performance in practice, particularly cylinder condensation and heat exchange between steam and the cylinder walls.

A pupil, assistant, and later collaborator of the Alsatian physicist and engineer Gustave-Adolphe Hirn, Hallauer conducted and wrote up many of the experiments that Hirn directed, and from 1868 carried out his own long series of trials on industrial steam engines. His trials of the compound engine contributed to the reputation of what Thurston called "the Alsatian school of experimenters". Thurston noted that Hallauer was among the first engineers to state openly that the ideal-cycle theory of the steam engine could not account for measured performance, and that theory should be brought into conformity with experiment.

Hallauer served through the Franco-Prussian War as a lieutenant of francs-tireurs, fighting at the Battle of Villersexel. He was an honorary member of the Société industrielle de Mulhouse and of the American Society of Mechanical Engineers, and died of typhoid fever in 1883 at the age of 41.

== Early life and education ==
Hallauer was born at Metz, then in the French department of Moselle, on 21 January 1842, and passed his early childhood in the countryside. At the age of ten he entered the lycée at Metz, where he specialized in mathematics and took the baccalauréat in science in 1860.

Hirn recalled that Hallauer treated the degree as a starting point rather than a goal, going on to study higher mathematics and technical drawing. At the age of twenty he entered the École professionnelle at Mulhouse to study applied mechanics, which settled the direction of his career; he graduated at the head of his class.

While a student, Hallauer came into contact with Gustave-Adolphe Hirn of Logelbach, near Colmar, a leading member of the Société industrielle de Mulhouse who was then engaged in extensive experimental research on losses in steam engines. Hallauer became Hirn's pupil and friend, carried out many of the experiments Hirn devised, and prepared their results for publication; his first paper was an account of Hirn's calorimetric method for determining the quality of steam.

== Early career, war service, and family ==
Hallauer took his first post as an apprentice-engineer (aspirant-ingénieur) at Bitschwiller, in the establishment of Stehelin. Early in 1868 he entered the service of the Grafenstaden machine works near Strasbourg, and when G. Leloutre (one of Hirn's collaborators) was appointed the firm's representative at Mulhouse, Hallauer was attached to him as aide and secretary. It was in this period that his experiments on the steam engine began; but they were interrupted by the Franco-Prussian War.

Hallauer took the field as a lieutenant of francs-tireurs and served for the entire campaign. He was first employed in the defense of the passes of the Vosges, then fought with the armies of Orléans and of the Loire, and afterward under General Bourbaki in the east. At the Battle of Villersexel on 9 January 1871, according to Hirn, four-fifths of his company fell. Rather than cross into Switzerland with the rest of Bourbaki's army, he led the remaining members of his company across the Jura Mountains and withdrew toward Lyon. They marched under fire from the pursuing enemy and went several days without food. He reached Lyon severely ill and spent four months in hospital there with dysentery and ophthalmia.

After the peace and the annexation of Alsace–Lorraine, the Grafenstaden firm no longer maintained a representative at Mulhouse, and Hallauer joined the Alsatian association of steam-equipment owners (Association des propriétaires d'appareils à vapeur) as second engineer. Toward the end of 1875 he became engineer to the Hartmann firm at Munster, where he remained for the rest of his life. (Note: Hirn dates the move to Munster to the end of 1875; Thurston's notice gives January 1875.) In January 1876 he married Jeanne Mathilde Verronnais, of Metz; the couple had two children, both of whom survived him.

== Research on steam engines ==
Hallauer's measurements of steam-engine performance captured the conditions of steam, condensate, and cylinder losses together with the work delivered by the engine. The measurements apportioned the losses quantitatively, so that engines could be designed from measured performance rather than from idealized cycle models. Peabody devoted the chapter "Hirn's Analysis" of his 1889 textbook to the method, drawing extensively on Hallauer's measurements.

Hallauer's work built on Hirn's calorimetric analysis of steam engines. His subsequent work provided test data on a number of engines. Those included simple expansive engines, specifically a Hirn engine used with superheated or saturated steam, and a Corliss engine with a steam jacket. He determined the work delivery using a steam-engine indicator or in some tests a "pandynamometer" (an angular torsion sensor) of Hirn's design, and he found steam conditions from measurement of temperature, pressure, and moisture content.

Hallauer also performed detailed calorimetry on compound steam engines. Those included stationary, vertical and horizontal Woolf beam engines. He further analyzed marine engine data collected by others.

According to Peabody, Hirn and Hallauer gave special attention to measuring the heat rejected from the walls of the cylinder during exhaust to the condenser. Hallauer's data directly showed that superheating steam reduced the condensation losses from the cylinder. Peabody noted that Hallauer's measurements showed a steam jacket to provide most of the energy needed to evaporate condensate during the exhaust stroke, in addition to reducing the initial condensation. Both Hallauer and Hirn concluded that the advantages from superheating steam exceeded those from a steam jacket.

Hirn and Hallauer became involved in a heated public dispute with the German engineer Gustav Zeuner, director of the Dresden Polytechnic and founder of its school of technical thermodynamics, with Zeuner arguing from theory and Hirn and Hallauer from experiment. They set out their case in Thermodynamique appliquée: réfutations d'une critique de M. G. Zeuner (1881), which held that measurement must take precedence over theoretical models. A second volume, Thermodynamique appliquée: réfutations d'une seconde critique de M. G. Zeuner, followed in 1883. Thurston wrote that Hallauer was among the first engineers to state openly that Rankine's ideal theory of the steam engine could not account for measured performance, and that theory should be brought into conformity with experiment. (Note: Rankine's ideal theory is now generally expressed in terms of the Rankine cycle.) In the third edition of his textbook (1910), Alfred Ewing wrote that the experiments of Hirn, Hallauer and others had "established beyond dispute" that cylinder condensation caused performance losses in steam engines.

== Recognition and death ==
Hallauer was an honorary member of the Société industrielle de Mulhouse and of the American Society of Mechanical Engineers (1882), as well as a member of the Société des ingénieurs civils de France. (Note: The American Society of Mechanical Engineers records his name in the Germanized form Otto Hallauer.) He died of typhoid fever on 5 December 1883, at the age of 41. His widow died in Paris in 1921.

== Selected works ==
- Hirn, Gustave-Adolphe; Hallauer, Octave (1881). Thermodynamique appliquée: réfutations d'une critique de M. G. Zeuner (in French). Paris: Gauthier-Villars.
- Hirn, Gustave-Adolphe; Hallauer, Octave (1883). Thermodynamique appliquée: réfutations d'une seconde critique de M. G. Zeuner (in French). Paris: Gauthier-Villars – via Google Books.
