= Louis Marie Florent du Châtelet =

French diplomat (1727–1793)

Le Châtelet arms

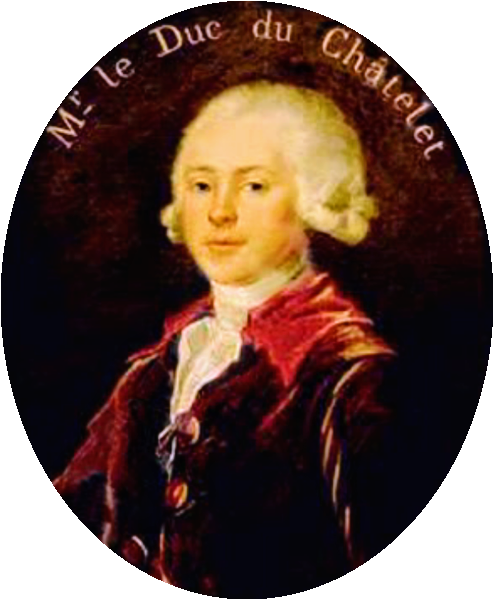
du Châtelet

Louis-Marie-Florent de Lomont d'Haraucourt, marquis later duc du Châtelet (20 November 1727, Semur-en-Auxois – 13 December 1793, Paris), was an aristocratic French Army general and diplomat of the Ancien Régime.

The Duke served as Governor of Semur-en-Auxois in Burgundy as well as Ambassador to the Court of St James's, besides other appointments. He was appointed to command the Regiment of French Guards shortly before the outbreak of the Revolution in 1789. Châtelet was subsequently imprisoned and guillotined, in 1793 aged 66.

== Family ==
The son and heir of the noble and ancient Châtelet family, his mother, Émilie du Châtelet, famously was a scientist and the lover of Voltaire.

On 20 June 1725, his father Florent-Claude du Chastelet (1695–1765) married Gabrielle-Émilie le Tonnelier de Breteuil (1706–1749), daughter of Louis Nicolas le Tonnelier de Breteuil (1648–1728) and his second wife Gabrielle Anne de Froulay (1670–1740), daughter of soldier Charles de Froulay (1601–1671). Like many marriages among the French nobility, theirs was an arranged marriage. The couple found they had little in common, but proprieties were observed in accordance with contemporary norms.

The Marquis and Marchioness produced three children: Françoise-Gabrielle-Pauline, married in 1743 to Alfonso Carafa, Duca di Montenero, Louis-Marie-Florent and Victor-Esprit. After bearing three children, Émilie, Marquise (Marchioness) du Châtelet, considered her marital responsibilities fulfilled and reached an agreement with her husband to live separate lives while still maintaining one household.

== Marriage ==
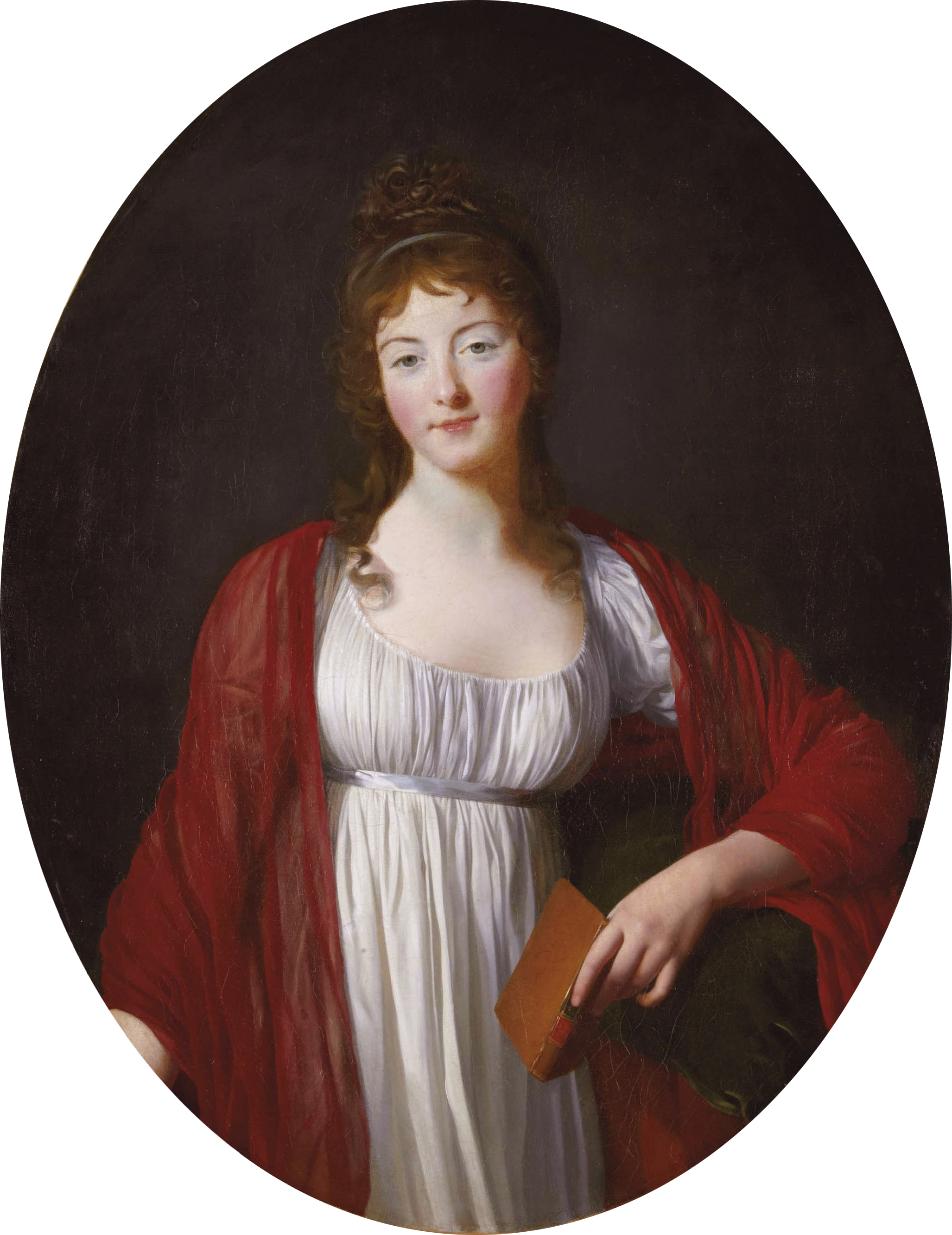
Diane-Adélaïde, Dowager Countess of Simiane (circa 1800)

The Duke of Châtelet married, in 1752, Diane-Adélaïde de Rochechouart (died 1794) but they had no children. The Duke adopted his wife's niece instead, also called Diane-Adélaïde, who was daughter of François-Jacques de Damas, marquis d'Antigny. She was born in Paris on 25 January 1761.

Having married, in 1777, Charles-François, comte de Simiane, thereby becoming styled Countess by courtesy, it soon became apparent that she had married a homosexual. Thereafter she sought comfort elsewhere with Gilbert du Motier, marquis de La Fayette who had served in the American Revolutionary War together with her husband (François, comte de Simiane died on 27 March 1787). The Duke also had an affair with her for the decade prior to his death in 1793. She never remarried and spent the remainder of her years at Chateau de Cirey, until her death (April 9, 1835).

== Political role ==
In 1787, Châtelet was appointed to preside over the provincial assembly of the Île-de-France, one of a number called to consider political and economic reform. The assembly consisted of representatives of all three recognized orders (clergy, nobility and bourgeois). They met in Melun on 11 July with Châtelet making the open address.

== Military role ==
In 1788, the Duke took command as colonel of the Regiment of French Guards, "succeeding but not replacing" the respected Duke de Biron. This elite unit of the Royal Military Household was permanently stationed in Paris and had many ties with the local population. Châtelet introduced "Prussian" codes of military discipline, which included harsh measures of physical punishment. At the same time he neglected to enforce greater professionalism amongst the aristocratic officer corps, who were often absent on leave and who left day-to-day administration of the regiment to its sergeants and corporals. As a result, obedience to orders amongst the rank and file weakened in the face of the increased disturbances in Paris during June–July 1789.

== Revolution and death ==
On 12 July, the unpopular Châtelet was recognized in a Paris street and pursued by a hostile crowd. He was rescued by a detachment of French Guards but two days later most of the regiment went over to the revolution, joining in the storming of the Bastille. Châtelet was subsequently arrested and, following a period in prison, guillotined on 13 December 1793. With his death the Châtelet family came to an end: there were 11 branches but all of them had died out, and he was the last member of the last surviving branch.

== Honours and titles ==
- Duc de France (Marquis before 1770)
- Grand-croix, Ordre de Saint-Louis
- Chevalier, Ordre de Malte
- Chevalier, Ordre du Saint-Esprit

== See also ==
- Hôtel du Châtelet
- House of Lorraine
- List of Ambassadors of France to the United Kingdom

== Sources ==
- Hubert Saget Louis Marie Florent du Châtelet
