= Elements of the Philosophy of Newton =

Science book by Voltaire

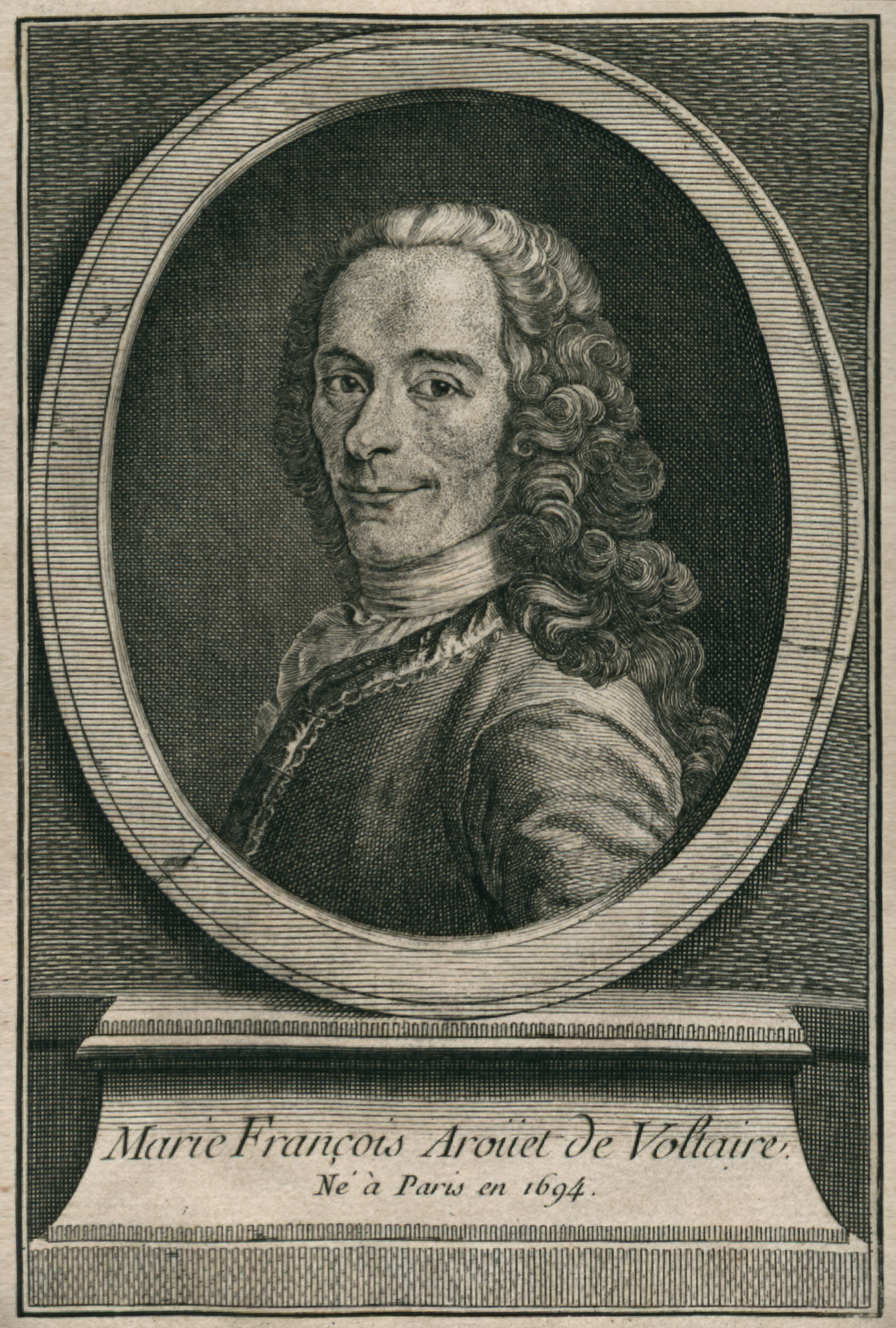
Elémens de la philosophie de Neuton, 1738

Elements of the Philosophy of Newton (French: Éléments de la philosophie de Newton) is a book written by the philosopher Voltaire and co-authored by mathematician and physicist Émilie du Châtelet in 1738 that helped to popularize the theories and thought of Isaac Newton. This book, coupled with Letters on the English, written in 1733, demonstrated that Voltaire had moved beyond the simple poetry and plays he had written previously.

A new edition was published in 1745 that contained an initial section on Newton's metaphysics, originally published separately in 1740. By 1745, when the edition of Voltaire's Éléments was published, the tides of thought were turning his way, and by 1750 the perception had become widespread that France had been converted from erroneous Cartesianism to modern Newtonianism thanks to Voltaire.

Charles Coulston Gillispie says that "Voltaire explained Newtonian science to the educated public more successfully than any other writer, perhaps because he took more pains to understand it."

== Contents ==
1. What Light is, and in What manner it comes to us.
2. The Property, which Light has of reflecting itself, was not truly known. It is not reflected by the solid Parts of Bodies as vulgarly believed.
3. Of the property which Light has of refracting in passing from one Substance into another, and of taking a new Course in its Progression.
4. Of the Form of the Eye, and in what manner Light enters and acts in that Organ.
5. Of Looking–Glasses, and Telescopes: Reasons given by Mathematicians for the Mysteries of Vision; that those Reasons are not altogether sufficient.
6. In what Manner we know Distances, Magnitudes, Figures, and Situations.
7. Of the Cause of the breaking of the Rays of Light in passing from one Medium to another; that this Cause is a general Law of Nature unknown before Newton; that the Inflection of Light is also an Effect of the same Cause.
  Voltaire discusses a case wherein Dr. William Cheselden healed the sight of a blind teenage boy. Voltaire notes that upon seeing for the first time, the boy thought the images were resting on his eyeballs.
8. The wonderful Effects of the Refraction of Light. The several Rays of Light have all possible Colours in themselves; what Refrangibility is. New Discoveries.
9. The Cause of Refrangibility; from which it appears that there are indivisible Bodies in Nature.
10. Proof that there are indivisible Atoms, and that the simple Particles of Light are Atoms of that kind. Discoveries continued.
11. Of the Rainbow; that Phenomenon a necessary Effect of the Laws of Refrangibility.
12. New Discoveries touching the Cause of Colours, which confirm the preceding Doctrine; Demonstration that Colours are occasioned by the Density and Thickness of the Parts of which Bodies are composed (or the Thickness of the Parts that compose the Surfaces only).
13. Consequences of these Discoveries. The mutual Action of Bodies upon Light.
14. Of the Resemblance between the seven Primitive Colours and the seven Notes in Musick.
15. Introductory Ideas concerning Gravity and the Laws of Attraction: That the Opinion of a subtil Matter, Vortices, and a Plenitude, ought to be rejected (But not that subtile Aether which Sir Isaac makes the Cause of Attraction, Refraction, Animal Motion, &c. which pervades the Universe).
16. That the Vortices and Plenitude of Descartes are impossible, and consequently that there is some other Cause of Gravity.
17. What is meant by Vacuity and Space, without which there could be neither Gravity nor Motion.
18. Gravitation demonstrated from the Discoveries of Galileo and Newton: That the Moon revolves in her Orbit by the Force of this Gravitation.
19. That Gravitation and Attraction direct all the Planets in their Courses.
20. Demonstrations of the Laws of Gravitation, drawn from the Rules of Kepler: That one of these Laws of Kepler demonstrates the Motion of the Earth.
21. New Proofs of Attraction. That the Inequalities of the Motion and Orbit of the Moon are necessarily the Effects of Attraction.
22. New Proofs and New Effects of Gravitation. That this Power is in every Particle of Matter. Discoveries dependent on this Principle.
23. The Theory of our Planetary World.
24. Of the Zodiacal Light, the Comets, and the fixed Stars.
25. Of the second Inequalities of the Motion of the Satellites, and the Phaenomena that depend thereon.
26. Glossary: Explanations of the hard Words used in this Treatise.
