= Peter Ewart =

British engineer (1767–1842)

- Born: 14 May 1767
- Died: 15 September 1842 (aged 75)
- Occupation: Engineer

Peter Ewart (14 May 1767 – 15 September 1842) was a Scottish engineer who was influential in developing the technologies of turbines and theories of thermodynamics.

== Biography ==
He was son of the Church of Scotland minister of Troqueer near Dumfries, and was one of eleven children. His brother Joseph Ewart became British ambassador to Prussia; John, a doctor, became Chief Inspector of East India Company hospitals in India; and William, father of William Ewart, was business partner of Sir John Gladstone, father of William Ewart Gladstone, whose godfather he was and whom he was named after.

Following graduation from the University of Edinburgh, he was apprenticed to millwright John Rennie. His work with water wheels led him to work with Matthew Boulton and James Watt for whom by 1790 he was agent in Manchester. At the same time as acting as agent he was also trading on his own account as a millwright, enabling him to provide the complementary shafts, gears and other necessities to harness the power of the Boulton & Watt steam engines.

In 1792, frustrated in administering the immature and, as yet, unreliable machinery, he left Boulton and Watt to work in partnership with Samuel Oldknow in a cotton bleaching and calico printing venture. He anticipated this being a profitable concern but the partnership was dissolved within a year and he returned to engineering. In 1798 he went into partnership with Samuel Greg, installing an innovative water wheel at Greg's Quarry Bank Mill on the River Bollin in Cheshire. As a standby, he installed a Watt steam engine.

By 1811, Ewart had abandoned the venture with Greg to concentrate on his own manufacturing business but also his scientific work. He became, along with John Dalton, a vice-president of the Manchester Literary and Philosophical Society and became active in the contemporary controversies about heat, work and energy. Motivated by a paper of John Playfair and encouraged by Dalton, in 1813 he published "On the measure of moving force" in which he defended the nascent ideas of the conservation of energy championed by John Smeaton. The paper was strongly to influence Dalton's pupil James Prescott Joule. A vocal advocate of the application of scientific knowledge in engineering, he was one of the founders of the Manchester Mechanics' Institute.

Ewart took up the post of Chief Engineer and Chief Inspector of Machinery with the Admiralty in 1835 and died on 15 September 1842 at Woolwich Dockyard when a chain snapped as he was supervising the removal of a boiler.

== See also ==
- Timeline of thermodynamics
- Vis viva – Historical concept in physics
