= Émilie du Châtelet =

French mathematician, physicist, and author (1706–1749)

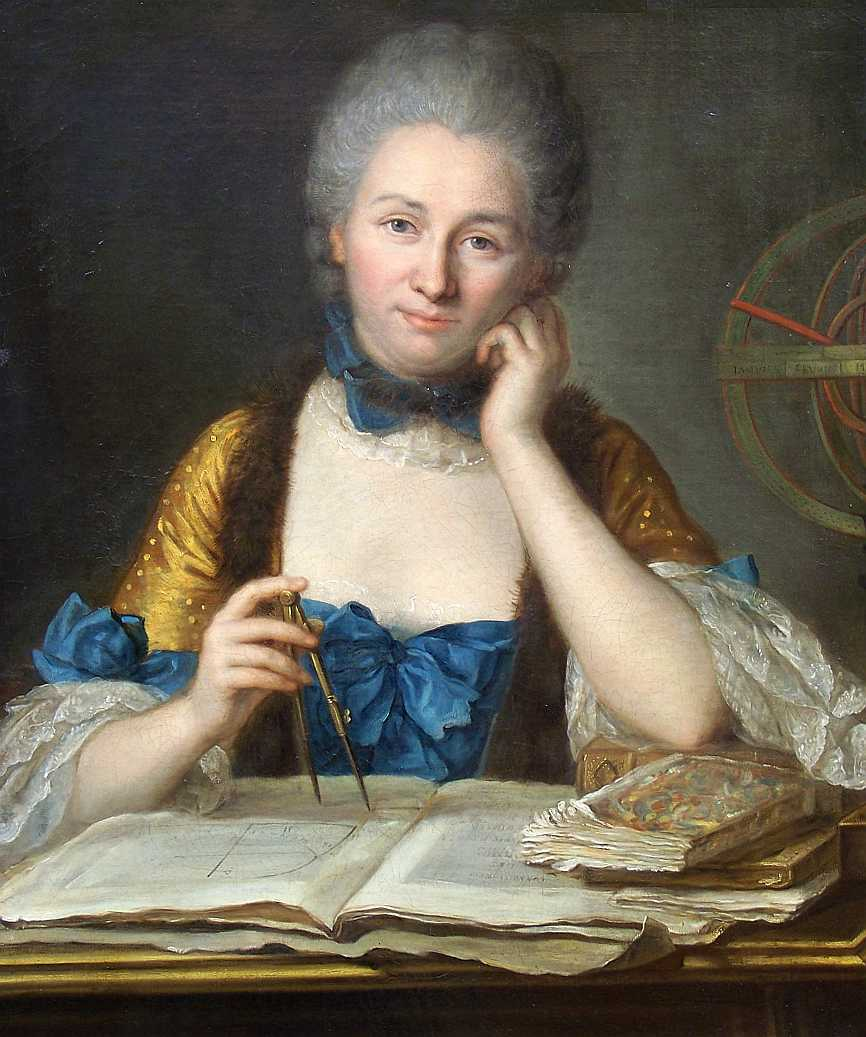
- Born: 17 December 1706; Paris, Kingdom of France
- Died: 10 September 1749 (aged 42); Lunéville, Duchy of Lorraine
- Occupations: Mathematician, philosopher, physicist, writer
- Era: 18th-century philosophy; Age of Enlightenment
- Known for: Relativity; Magnum opus, Foundations of Physics (1740, 1742); Translation of Newton's Principia into French; Natural philosophy that combines Newtonian physics with Leibnizian metaphysics; Advocacy of Newtonian physics
- Spouse: Marquis Florent-Claude du Chastellet-Lomont (m. 1725)
- Partner: Voltaire (1733–1749)
- Children: Françoise Gabriel Pauline; Louis Marie Florent; Victor-Esprit; Stanislas-Adélaïde du Châtelet
- Scientific career
- Fields: Physics; Natural philosophy; Mathematics; Philosophy

Signature
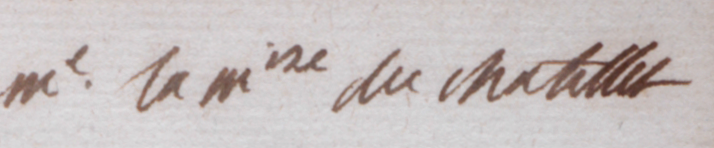

Gabrielle Émilie Le Tonnelier de Breteuil, Marquise du Châtelet (French: [emili dy ʃɑtlɛ]; 17 December 1706 – 10 September 1749) was a French mathematician, philosopher, and physicist.

Her most recognized achievement is her philosophical magnum opus, Institutions de Physique (Paris, 1740, first edition; Foundations of Physics). She then revised the text substantially for a second edition with the slightly modified title Institutions physiques (Paris, 1742). It circulated widely, generated heated debates, and was translated into German and Italian in 1743. The Institutions covers a wide range of topics, including the principles of knowledge, the existence of God, hypotheses, space, time, matter and the forces of nature. Several chapters treat Newton's theory of universal gravity and associated phenomena. Later in life, she translated into French, and wrote an extensive commentary on, Isaac Newton's Philosophiæ Naturalis Principia Mathematica. The text, published posthumously in 1756, is still considered the standard French translation to this day.

Du Châtelet participated in the famous vis viva debate, concerning the best way to measure the force of a body and the best means of thinking about conservation principles. Posthumously, her ideas were represented prominently in the most famous text of the French Enlightenment, the Encyclopédie of Denis Diderot and Jean le Rond d'Alembert, first published shortly after du Châtelet's death.

She is also known as the intellectual collaborator and romantic partner of Voltaire, having an intellectual and romantic affair with him that lasted 16 years. The two took refuge at Du Châtelet's husband's château at Cirey as Voltaire was avoiding arrest after a controversial publication. Voltaire paid for renovations of the château and Du Châtelet's husband would sometimes stay with the two lovers. They collected up to 21,000 books as a pair where they studied them and performed scientific experiments at Cirey.

In the two centuries since her death, numerous biographies, books, and plays have been written about her life and work. In the early twenty-first century, her life and ideas have generated renewed interest.

== Early life ==
Émilie du Châtelet was born Gabrielle Émilie Le Tonnelier de Breteuil in Paris, in the Kingdom of France, on 17 December 1706. She was the only daughter among six children of Louis Nicolas le Tonnelier de Breteuil and Gabrielle Anne de Froulay. Her father was a member of the lesser nobility and served at the court of Louis XIV as Principal Secretary and Introducer of Ambassadors.

Her brothers included René-Alexandre Le Tonnelier de Breteuil, Charles-Auguste Le Tonnelier de Breteuil and Elisabeth-Théodore Le Tonnelier de Breteuil. Two other brothers died young. Du Châtelet also had an older paternal half-sister, Michelle, born in 1686.

Her father held a weekly salon at the family home, where writers and scientists were among the guests. When Louis XIV died in 1715, her father retired from his court position, and the family remained in Paris during the rest of du Châtelet's childhood.

== Education ==
Du Châtelet's early education is not well documented, and accounts of it contain considerable uncertainty.

Her father, Louis Nicolas le Tonnelier de Breteuil, arranged for Bernard Le Bovier de Fontenelle, the permanent secretary of the French Académie des Sciences, to discuss astronomy with her when she was ten. Accounts differ about the role of her mother, Gabrielle Anne de Froulay, in her education. Some sources state that she opposed her daughter's intellectual interests, while others indicate that she encouraged du Châtelet to question accepted claims.

Her father arranged training in fencing and riding and later brought tutors to the family home. By the age of twelve, she was fluent in Latin, Italian, Greek and German, and she later translated Greek and Latin plays and philosophy into French. She also studied mathematics, literature and science. Du Châtelet danced, played the harpsichord, sang opera and acted. As a teenager, she used mathematical strategies in gambling when she needed money to buy books.

In 1733, aged 26, du Châtelet resumed her mathematical studies. She initially studied algebra and calculus with Pierre Louis Moreau de Maupertuis, a French mathematician and member of the Académie des Sciences. By 1735, she was studying with Alexis Clairaut, a French mathematician known for Clairaut's equation and Clairaut's theorem.

Du Châtelet also sought access to the intellectual life of Paris. At the Café Gradot, where men gathered for intellectual discussions, she was ejected when she attempted to join one of her teachers. She returned wearing men's clothing and was admitted.

Du Châtelet later corresponded with Johann II Bernoulli and Leonhard Euler, both Swiss mathematicians.

== Relationships and children ==
=== Florent-Claude du Chastellet-Lomont ===
On 12 June 1725, she married the Marquis Florent-Claude du Chastellet-Lomont (1695–1765). (Note: The Lomont suffix indicates the branch of the du Chastellet family; another such branch was the du Chastellet-Clemont.) Her marriage conferred the title of Marquise du Chastellet. (Note: The spelling Châtelet (replacing the s by a circumflex over the a) was introduced by Voltaire, and has now become standard. (Andrew, Edward (2006). "Voltaire and his female protectors". Patrons of enlightenment. University of Toronto Press. p. 101. ISBN 978-0-8020-9064-5.)) Like many marriages among the nobility, theirs was arranged. As a wedding gift, her husband was made governor of Semur-en-Auxois in Burgundy by his father; the recently married couple moved there at the end of September 1725. Du Châtelet was eighteen at the time, her husband thirty-four.

Émilie du Châtelet and the Marquis Florent-Claude du Chastellet-Lomont had three children: Françoise-Gabrielle-Pauline (1726–1754), married in 1743 to Alfonso Carafa, Duca di Montenero (1713–1760), Louis Marie Florent (1727–1793), and Victor-Esprit (1733–1734). Victor-Esprit died as an infant in late summer 1734, likely the last Sunday in August. On 4 September 1749 Émilie du Châtelet gave birth to Stanislas-Adélaïde du Châtelet, daughter of Jean François de Saint-Lambert. She died as a toddler in Lunéville on 6 May 1751.

After bearing three children, Émilie, Marquise du Châtelet, considered her marital responsibilities fulfilled and reached an agreement with her husband to live separate lives while still maintaining one household.

=== Voltaire ===
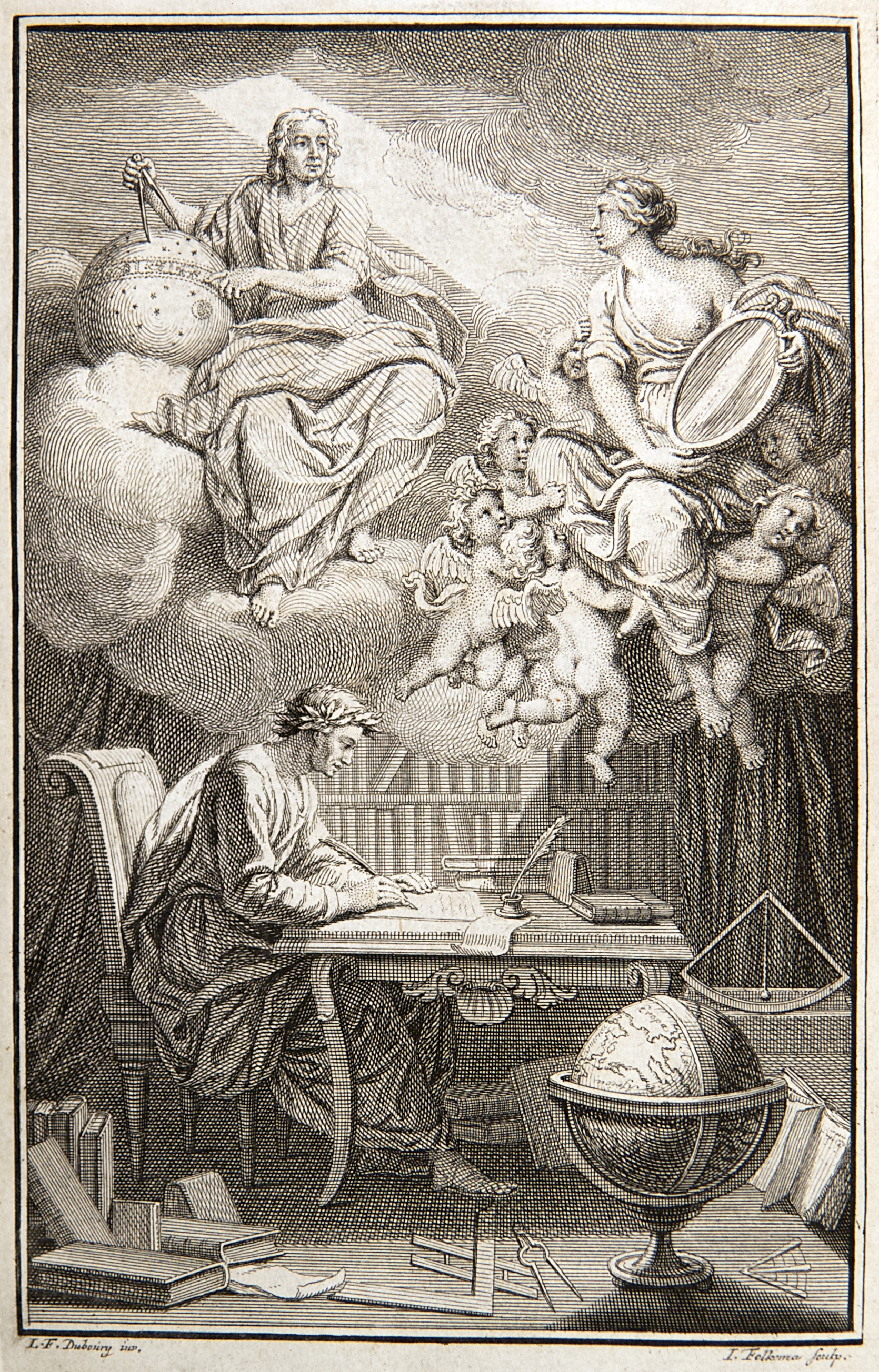
The frontispiece to Voltaire's Elements of the Philosophy of Newton depicts du Châtelet above Voltaire, with light descending from Newton through her to Voltaire.

Du Châtelet may have known the French writer and philosopher Voltaire during her childhood through the salons held by her father, which Voltaire attended. Voltaire later dated their first meeting to 1729, after his return from England. Their romantic relationship began in 1733, when du Châtelet was 26, after she returned to society following the birth of her third child. Du Châtelet remained married to Florent-Claude du Chastellet-Lomont, while her relationship with Voltaire continued until her death 16 years later.

In 1734, when du Châtelet was 27, Voltaire left Paris after his Letters on the English brought the threat of arrest and established himself at the Château de Cirey, the du Châtelet family estate in Haute-Marne in northeastern France. Cirey became a home for both du Châtelet and Voltaire and the main setting for their intellectual collaboration. The château was remodelled to include a laboratory with scientific instruments for their experiments.

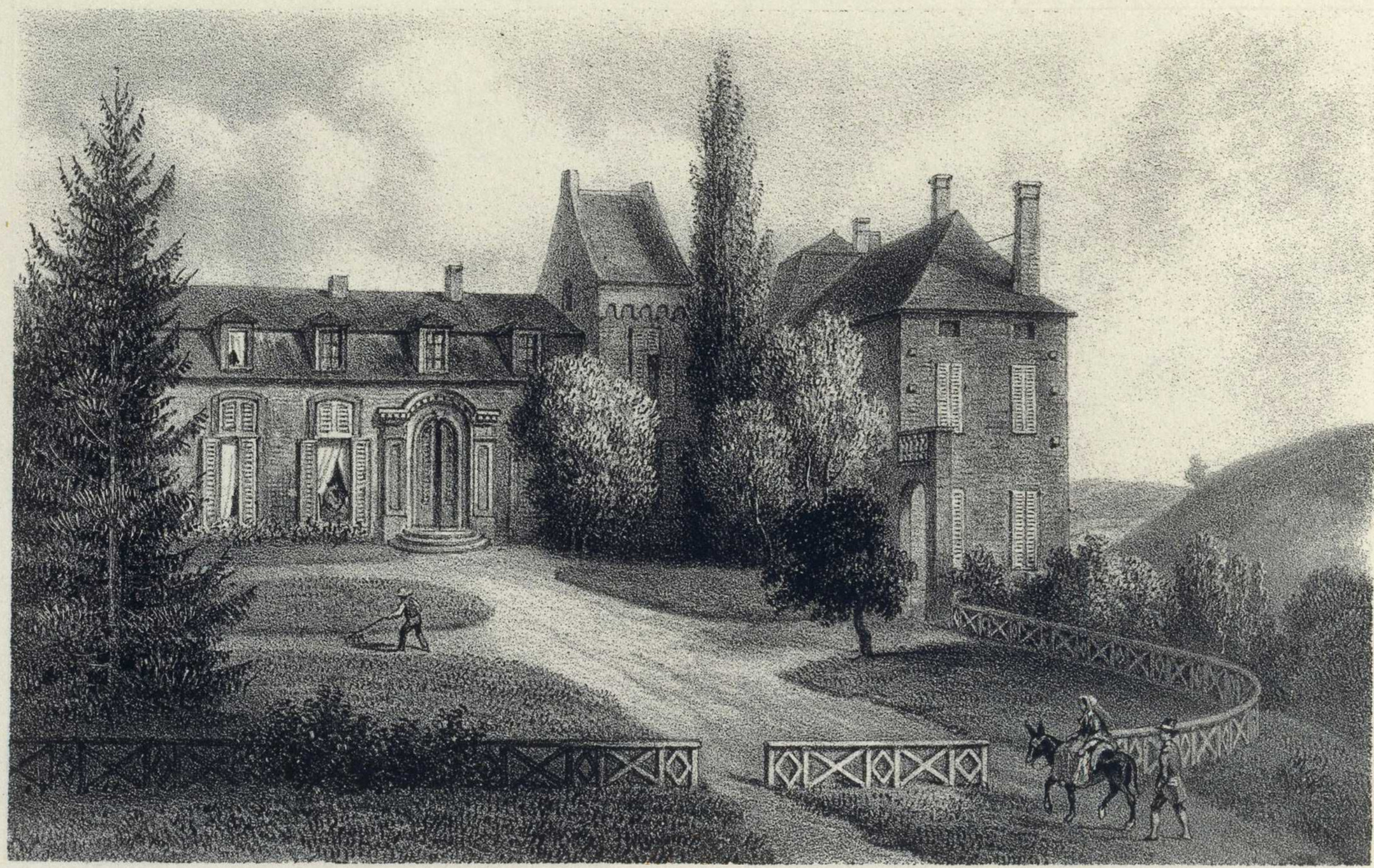
The Château de Cirey, where du Châtelet and Voltaire lived and worked together

Du Châtelet and Voltaire worked closely together at Cirey and shared an interest in the work of the English mathematician and physicist Isaac Newton. Du Châtelet's mathematical work with Pierre Louis Moreau de Maupertuis exceeded Voltaire's mathematical abilities. Scholars have identified significant contributions by du Châtelet, particularly to the more technical material, in Voltaire's Elements of the Philosophy of Newton, published in 1738, although the extent of her contribution to the work is uncertain. Voltaire addressed the work to du Châtelet in both verse and prose dedications, praising her knowledge of the subjects it discussed.

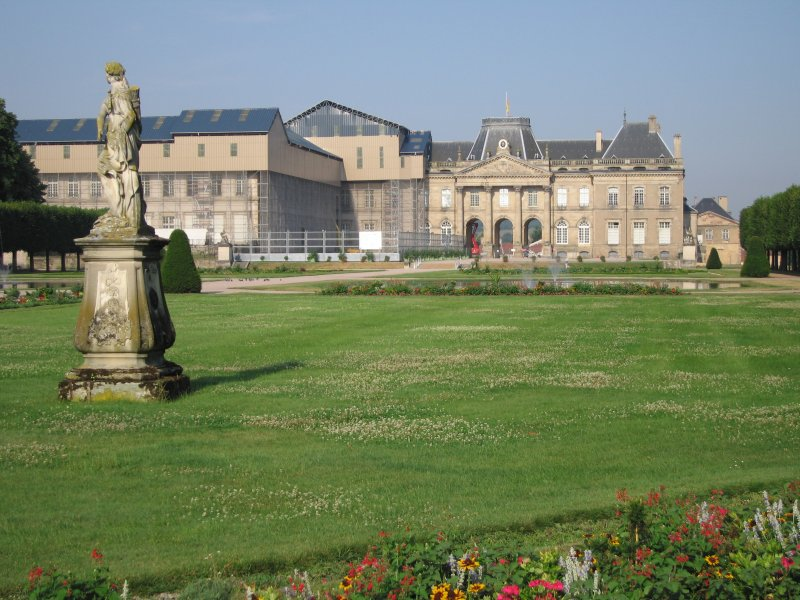
The château of Lunéville

=== Saint-Lambert and fourth child ===
A new relationship began late in du Châtelet's life. In 1748, aged 41, she became involved with Jean François de Saint-Lambert, a French poet and military officer, during a stay at Lunéville in the Duchy of Lorraine. Saint-Lambert belonged to the court of Stanisław Leszczyński, the former king of Poland and then Duke of Lorraine. Du Châtelet remained close to Voltaire, who accompanied her during her stays at Lunéville in 1748 and 1749.

Du Châtelet became pregnant by Saint-Lambert more than 16 years after the birth of her previous child. At the age of 42, she feared that she would not survive another childbirth and expressed her concern in her correspondence. She nevertheless continued working intensively on her French translation and commentary on Newton's Principia Mathematica, his major work on mathematics and physics. By January 1749 she had completed a preface to the work, and in May she was devoting most of her time to it while working with the French mathematician Alexis Clairaut.

On 4 September 1749, du Châtelet gave birth at Lunéville to her fourth child, a daughter named Stanislas-Adélaïde. Du Châtelet died there at about 1 a.m. on 10 September, aged 42, six days after giving birth, with Saint-Lambert present. Her daughter survived her by less than two years, dying in Lunéville on 6 May 1751.

== Correspondence ==
Seventy-six surviving letters from du Châtelet to Pierre Louis Moreau de Maupertuis, a French mathematician and natural philosopher who taught her mathematics, date from 1734 to 1744. In her early letters to Maupertuis, du Châtelet discussed her mathematical studies and sought his advice. Their correspondence later covered subjects including Newtonian gravity, the properties of matter, free will, the vis viva debate and the ideas of the German mathematician and philosopher Gottfried Wilhelm Leibniz.

Du Châtelet also corresponded with mathematicians and scientists elsewhere in Europe. They included the French mathematician Alexis Clairaut, the Swiss mathematicians Leonhard Euler and Johann II Bernoulli, and the French mathematician and physicist François Jacquier. She also exchanged letters with Frederick II, king of Prussia and a patron of the arts and sciences. In May 1739, Frederick had a work by the German philosopher Christian Wolff translated into French and sent to du Châtelet at the Château de Cirey. Du Châtelet later sent Frederick an advance copy of her Institutions de Physique.

Du Châtelet continued corresponding with other mathematicians while working on her translation and commentary on the English mathematician and physicist Isaac Newton's Principia. Her correspondence with Johann II Bernoulli, a Swiss mathematician and professor at the University of Basel, continued until shortly before her death in 1749.

== Publications and works ==
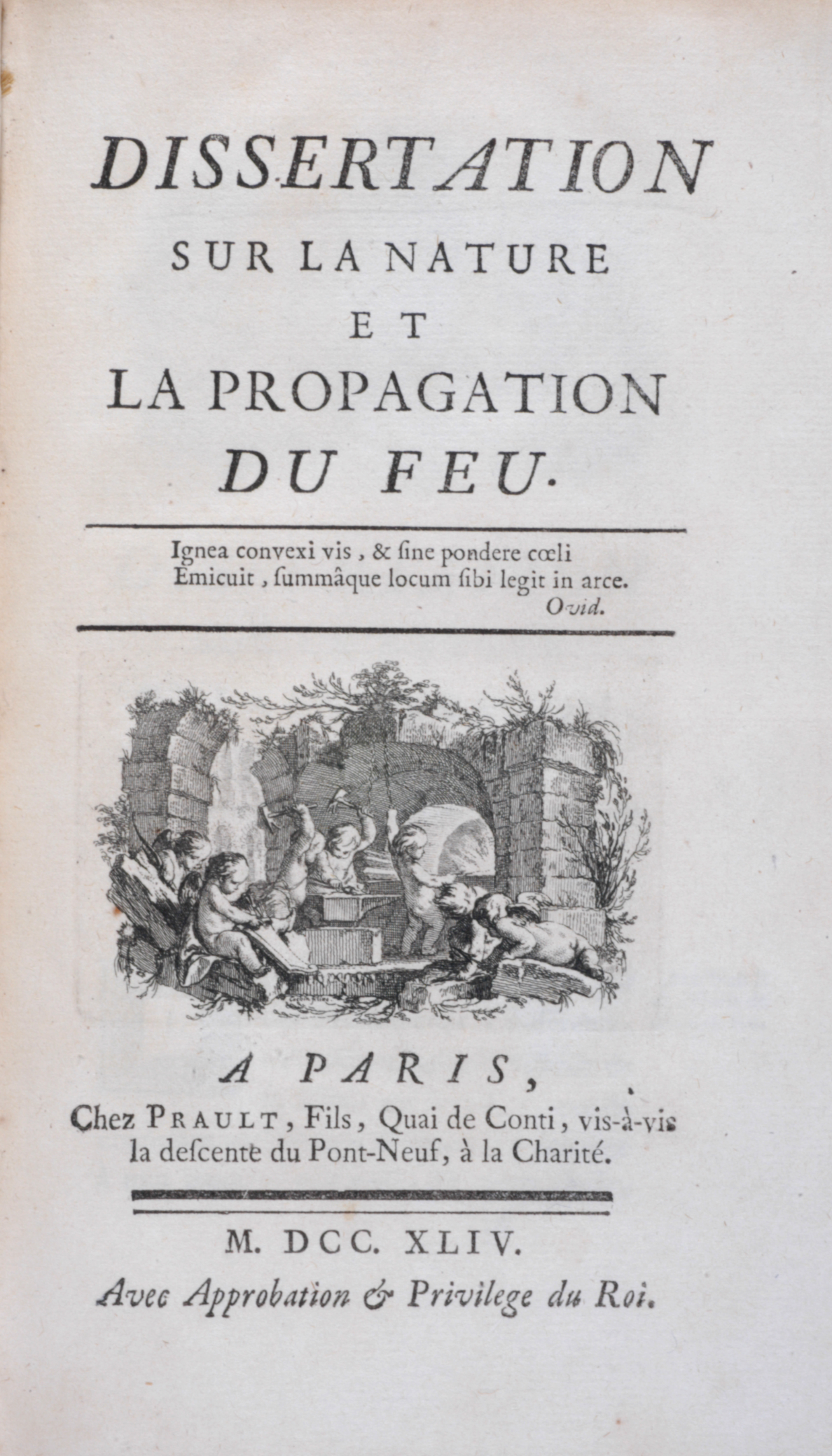
Dissertation sur la nature et la propagation du feu, 1744

=== Dissertation sur la nature et la propagation du feu ===
In 1737, when du Châtelet was 30, the Royal Academy of Sciences in Paris announced its 1738 prize competition, seeking an explanation of what fire was and how it spread. The Academy was a major scientific institution in 18th-century Europe. Women could attend its activities as members of the audience but could not participate in the institution on equal terms with its male members. Du Châtelet began investigating the subject while Voltaire, her partner and intellectual collaborator, was preparing his own entry at the Château de Cirey in northeastern France. She initially worked with him but came to disagree with several of his ideas about fire. Without telling Voltaire, she conducted her own work and prepared a separate entry for the competition.

Du Châtelet's Dissertation sur la nature et la propagation du feu (Dissertation on the Nature and Propagation of Fire) examined both what fire was and how it spread. Like many natural philosophers of the period, she treated fire as a distinct form of matter, but she argued that it had no weight, in contrast to Voltaire's claim that fire had weight. She also examined the relationship between fire and light and suggested that stars other than the Sun might produce colours that are not present in sunlight on Earth.

Du Châtelet did not win the competition, nor did Voltaire. The Academy's judges nevertheless considered their essays among the best submissions. After the authors asked that their works be printed, the Academy agreed to include them in its published collection with the winning entries. Du Châtelet's dissertation appeared in the collection in 1739, when she was 32. It was the first work by a woman published by the Academy.

Du Châtelet continued to revise the Dissertation after the competition. A separate edition was published in Paris in 1744, when she was 37. Compared with her original competition entry, the revised work drew more strongly on the ideas of the German mathematician and philosopher Gottfried Wilhelm Leibniz, while continuing to support many of the ideas of the English mathematician and physicist Isaac Newton.

=== Institutions de Physique ===
Her book Institutions de Physique ("Lessons in Physics") was published in 1740; it was presented as a review of new ideas in science and philosophy to be studied by her 13-year-old son, but it incorporated and sought to reconcile complex ideas from the leading thinkers of the time. The book and subsequent debate contributed to her becoming a member of the Academy of Sciences of the Institute of Bologna in 1746. Du Châtelet originally preferred anonymity in her role as the author, because she wished to conceal her gender. Ultimately, however, Institutions was convincing to salon-dwelling intellectuals in spite of the commonplace sexism.

Institutions discussed, refuted, and synthesized many ideas of prominent mathematicians and physicists of the time. In particular, the text is famous for discussing ideas that originated with G. W. Leibniz and Christian Wolff, and for using the principle of sufficient reason often associated with their philosophical work. This main work is equally famous for providing a detailed discussion and evaluation of ideas that originated with Isaac Newton and his followers. That combination is more remarkable than it might seem now, since the ideas of Leibniz and Newton were regarded as fundamentally opposed to one another by most of the major philosophical figures of the eighteenth century.

In chapter I, du Châtelet included a description of her rules of reasoning, based largely on Descartes’s principle of contradiction and Leibniz’s principle of sufficient reason. In chapter II, she applied these rules of reasoning to metaphysics, discussing God, space, time, and matter. In chapters III through VI, du Châtelet continued to discuss the role of God and his relationship to his creation. In chapter VII, she broke down the concept of matter into three parts: the macroscopic substance available to sensory perception, the atoms composing that macroscopic material, and an even smaller constituent unit similarly imperceptible to human senses. However, she carefully added that there was no way to know how many levels truly existed.

The remainder of Institutions considered more metaphysics and classical mechanics. Du Châtelet discussed the concepts of space and time in a manner more consistent with modern relativity than her contemporaries. She described both space and time in the abstract, as representations of the relationships between coexistent bodies rather than physical substances. This included an acknowledgement that "absolute" place is an idealization and that "relative" place is the only real, measurable quantity. Du Châtelet also presented a thorough explanation of Newton’s laws of motion and their function on earth.

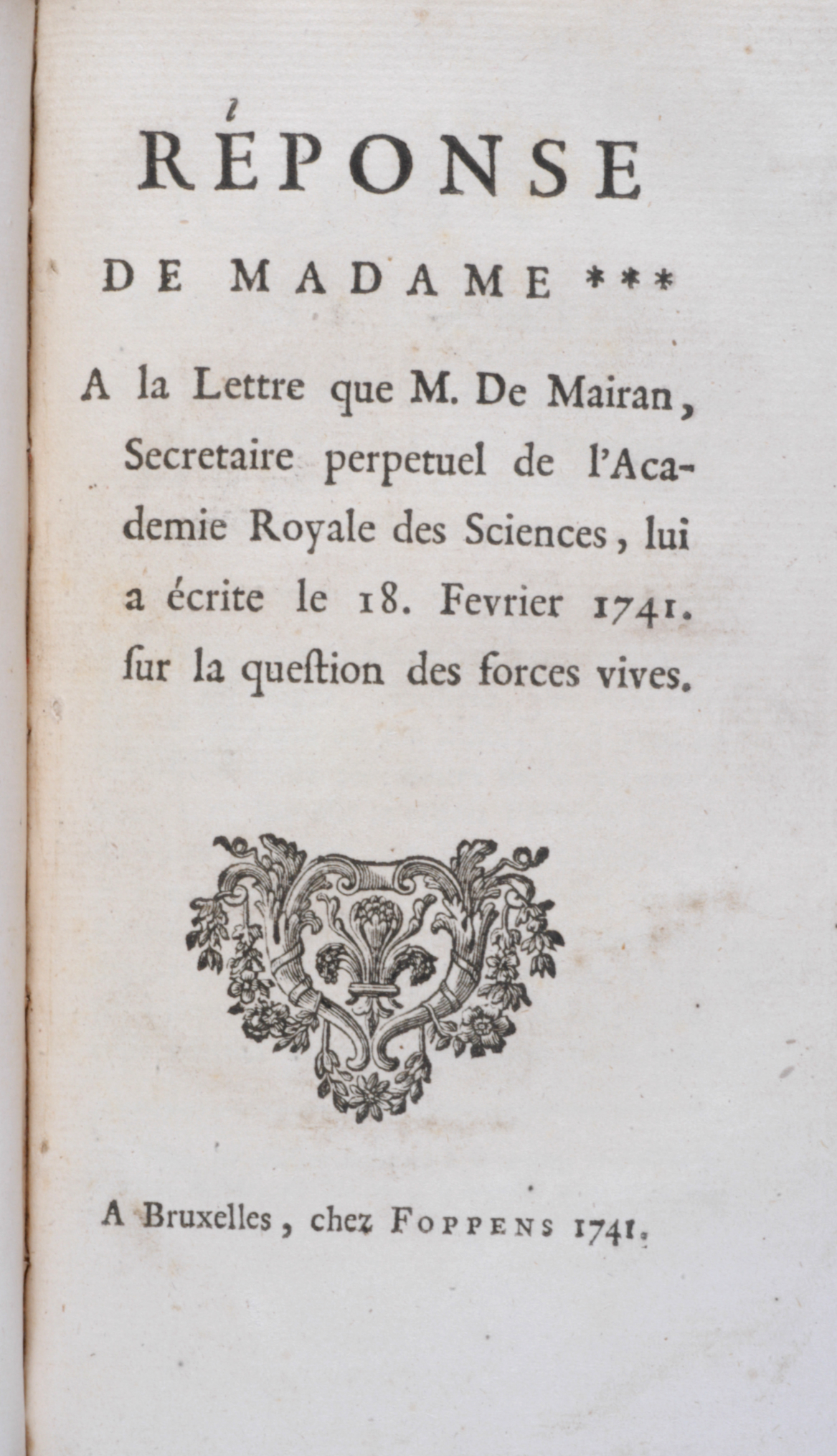
Réponse de Madame la Marquise du Chastelet, 1741

=== Réponse de Madame la Marquise du Chastelet, a la lettre que M. de Mairan. ===
In 1741, du Châtelet published a book entitled Réponse de Madame la Marquise du Chastelet, a la lettre que M. de Mairan. D'Ortous de Mairan, secretary of the Academy of Sciences, had published a set of arguments addressed to her regarding the appropriate mathematical expression for forces vives ("living forces"). Du Châtelet presented a point-by-point rebuttal of de Mairan's arguments, causing him to withdraw from the controversy.

Immanuel Kant's first publication in 1747, 'Thoughts on the True Estimation of Living Forces' (Gedanken zur wahren Schätzung der lebendigen Kräfte), focused on du Châtelet's pamphlet rebutting the arguments of the secretary of the French Academy of Sciences, Mairan. Kant's opponent, Johann Augustus Eberhard, accused Kant of taking ideas from du Châtelet. In his Observations on the Feeling of the Beautiful and Sublime, Kant wrote ad hominem and sexist critiques of learned women of the time, including Mme. du Châtelet, rather than writing about their work. Kant stated: "A woman who has a head full of Greek, like Mme. Dacier, or who conducts disputations about mechanics, like the Marquise du Châtelet might as well also wear a beard; for that might perhaps better express the mien of depth for which they strive."

=== Translation and commentary on Newton's Principia ===
In 1749, the year of du Châtelet's death, she completed the work regarded as her outstanding achievement: her translation into French, with her commentary, of Newton's Philosophiae Naturalis Principia Mathematica (often referred to as simply the Principia), including her derivation of the notion of conservation of energy from its principles of mechanics. Despite modern misconceptions, Newton's work on his Principia was not perfect. Du Châtelet took on the task of not only translating his work from Latin to French, but adding important information to it as well. Her commentary was as essential to her contemporaries as her spreading of Newton's ideas. Du Châtelet's commentary was very extensive, comprising almost two-thirds of volume II of her edition.

To undertake this project, du Châtelet prepared to translate the Principia by continuing her studies in analytic geometry, mastering calculus, and reading works in experimental physics. Her preparation afforded her commentary information derived from her own research as well as from the work of other scientists she studied or worked alongside. This helped du Châtelet with her commentary on the Principia and its translation and in writing her other works such as the Institutions de Physique.

Du Châtelet made very important corrections in her translation that helped support Newton's theories about the universe. Newton, based on the theory of fluids, suggested that gravitational attraction would cause the poles of the earth to flatten, thus causing the earth to bulge outwards at the equator. In Clairaut's Memoire, which confirmed Newton's hypothesis about the shape of the Earth and gave more accurate approximations, Clairaut discovered a way to determine the shape of the other planets in the Solar System. Du Châtelet used Clairaut's proposal that the planets had different densities in her commentary to correct Newton's belief that the Earth and the other planets were made of homogeneous substances.

Du Châtelet used the work of Daniel Bernoulli, a Swiss mathematician and physicist, to further explain Newton's theory of the tides. This proof depended upon the three-body problem which still confounded even the best mathematicians in 18th century Europe. Using Clairaut's hypothesis about the differing of the planets' densities, Bernoulli theorized that the moon was 70 times denser than Newton had believed. Du Châtelet used this discovery in her commentary of the Principia, further supporting Newton's theory about the law of gravitation.

Published ten years after her death, today du Châtelet's translation of the Principia is still the standard translation of the work into French, and remains the only complete rendition in that language. Her translation was so important that it was the only one in any language used by Newtonian expert I. Bernard Cohen to write his own English version of Newton's Principia. Du Châtelet not only used the works of other great scientists to revise Newton's work, but she added her own thoughts and ideas as a scientist in her own right. Her contributions in the French translation made Newton and his ideas look even better in the scientific community and around the world, and recognition for this is owed to du Châtelet. This enormous project, along with her Foundations of Physics, proved du Châtelet's abilities as a great mathematician. Her translation and commentary of the Principia contributed to the completion of the Scientific Revolution in France and to its acceptance in Europe.

=== Translation of the Fable of the Bees, and other works ===
Du Châtelet translated The Fable of the Bees in a free adaptation. She also wrote works on optics, rational linguistics, and the nature of free will. In her first independent work, the preface to her translation of the Fable of the Bees, du Châtelet argued strongly for women's education, particularly a strong secondary education as was available for young men in the French collèges. By denying women a good education, she argued, society prevents women from becoming eminent in the arts and sciences.

== Philosophy ==
=== Criticizing Locke and the debate on thinking matter ===
In her writings, du Châtelet criticized John Locke's philosophy. She emphasizes the necessity of the verification of knowledge through experience: "Locke's idea of the possibility of thinking matter is […] abstruse". Her critique on Locke originated in her commentary on Bernard de Mandeville's The Fable of the Bees. She resolutely favored universal principles that precondition human knowledge and action, and maintained that this kind of law is innate. Du Châtelet claimed the necessity of a universal presupposition, because if there were no such beginning, all our knowledge is relative. In that way, Du Châtelet rejected Locke's aversion to innate ideas and prior principles. She also reversed Locke's negation of the principle of contradiction, which would constitute the basis of her methodic reflections in the Institutions. On the contrary, she affirmed her arguments in favor of the necessity of prior and universal principles. "Two and two could then make as well 4 as 6 if prior principles did not exist."

References by Pierre Louis Moreau de Maupertuis and Julien Offray de La Mettrie to du Châtelet's deliberations on motion, free will, thinking matter, numbers, and the way to conduct metaphysics are a sign of the importance of her reflections. She rebuts the claim to finding truth by using mathematical laws, and argues against Maupertuis.

=== Advocacy of kinetic energy ===
Although in the early eighteenth century the concepts of force and momentum had been long understood, the idea of energy as being transferable between different systems was still in its infancy, and would not be fully resolved until the nineteenth century. It is now accepted that the total mechanical momentum of a system is conserved and that none is lost to friction. Simply put, there is no 'momentum friction', and momentum cannot transfer between different forms, and particularly, there is no 'potential momentum'. In the twentieth century, Emmy Noether proved this to be true for all problems where the initial state is symmetric in generalized coordinates. E.g., mechanical energy, either kinetic or potential, may be lost to another form, but the total is conserved in time.

Du Châtelet's contribution was the hypothesis of the conservation of total energy, as distinct from momentum. In doing so, she became the first to elucidate the concept of energy as such, and to quantify its relationship to mass and velocity based on her own empirical studies. Inspired by the theories of Gottfried Leibniz, she repeated and publicized an experiment originally devised by Willem 's Gravesande in which heavy balls were dropped from different heights into a sheet of soft clay. Each ball's kinetic energy – as indicated by the quantity of material displaced – was shown to be proportional to the square of the velocity: She showed that if two balls were identical except for their mass, they would make the same size indentation in the clay if the quantity $mv^2$ (then called vis viva) were the same for each ball.

Newton's work assumed the exact conservation of only mechanical momentum. A broad range of mechanical problems in physics are soluble only if energy conservation is included. The collision and scattering of two point masses is one example. Leonhard Euler and Joseph-Louis Lagrange established a more formal framework for mechanics using the results of du Châtelet.

=== Illusions and happiness ===
In Discours sur le bonheur, du Châtelet argues that illusions are an instrument for happiness. To be happy, "one must have freed oneself of prejudice, one must be virtuous, healthy, have tastes and passions, and be susceptible to illusions...". She mentions many things one needs for happiness, but emphasizes the necessity of illusions and that one should not dismiss all illusions. One should not abandon all illusions because they can bestow positivity and hope, which can ameliorate one's well-being. However, du Châtelet also admonishes against trusting all illusions, because many illusions are harmful to oneself. They may cause negativity through a false reality, which can cause disappointment or even limit one’s abilities. This lack of self-awareness from so many illusions may cause one to be self-deceived. She suggests a balance of trusting and rejecting illusions for happiness, so as not to become self-deceived.

In Foundation of Physics, du Châtelet discusses avoiding error by applying two principles – the principle of contradiction and the principle of sufficient reason. Du Châtelet presumed that all knowledge is developed from more fundamental knowledge that relies on infallible knowledge. She states that this infallible fundamental knowledge is most reliable because it is self-explanatory and exists with a small number of conclusions. Her logic and principles are used for an arguably less flawed understanding of physics, metaphysics, and morals.

The principle of contradiction essentially claims that the thing implying a contradiction is impossible. So, if one does not use the principle of contradiction, one will have errors including the failure to reject a contradiction-causing element. To get from the possible or impossible to the actual or real, the principle of sufficient reason was revised by du Châtelet from Leibniz's concept and integrated into science. The principle of sufficient reason suggests that every true thing has a reason for being so, and things without a reason do not exist. In essence, every effect has a cause, so the element in question must have a reasonable cause to be so.

In application, du Châtelet proposed that being happy and immoral are mutually exclusive. According to du Châtelet, this principle is embedded within the hearts of all individuals, and even wicked individuals have an undeniable consciousness of this contradiction that is grueling. It suggests one cannot be living a happy life while living immorally. So, her suggested happiness requires illusions with a virtuous life. These illusions are naturally given like passions and tastes, and cannot be created. Du Châtelet recommended we maintain the illusions we receive and work to not dismantle the trustworthy illusions, because we cannot get them back. In other words, true happiness is a blending of illusions and morality. If one merely attempts to be moral, one will not obtain the happiness one deeply seeks. If one just strives for the illusions, one will not get the happiness that is genuinely desired. One needs to endeavor in both illusions and happiness to get the sincerest happiness.

=== Biblical scholarship ===
Du Châtelet wrote a critical analysis of the entire Bible. A synthesis of her remarks on the Book of Genesis was published in English in 1967 by Ira O. Wade of Princeton in his book Voltaire and Madame du Châtelet: An Essay on Intellectual Activity at Cirey and a book of her complete notes was published in 2011, in the original French, edited and annotated by Bertram Eugene Schwarzbach.

== Impact ==
Du Châtelet's work reached an international audience during the final decade of her life. Her Institutions de Physique, first published in Paris in 1740 when she was 33 and substantially revised in 1742, was translated into German and Italian in 1743. Her works were also published and republished in Paris, London and Amsterdam and discussed in European scholarly journals.

Her ideas also circulated through the work of other writers. The Italian writer Francesco Algarotti stayed with du Châtelet and Voltaire at the Château de Cirey while developing Il Newtonianismo per le dame, first published in 1737. Du Châtelet contributed to the intellectual environment in which Algarotti developed the work, which presented Newtonian ideas through a series of dialogues.

Her participation in the debate over vis viva, or "living force", followed a similar path beyond France. In 1741, aged 34, du Châtelet published a response to Jean-Jacques d'Ortous de Mairan, secretary of the French Academy of Sciences, concerning how the force of a moving object should be measured. Their exchange was translated into German that same year, and German and Italian translations of the Institutions appeared in 1743. Six years later, in 1747, Immanuel Kant discussed du Châtelet's position on vis viva extensively in his first published work, Thoughts on the True Estimation of Living Forces.

Du Châtelet's writings continued to circulate after her death in 1749, aged 42. Her Institutions was used as both an acknowledged and unacknowledged source for Denis Diderot and Jean le Rond d'Alembert's Encyclopédie. Her French translation and commentary on Isaac Newton's Principia, completed shortly before her death, was published posthumously. A preliminary edition appeared in 1756, seven years after her death, followed by the complete edition in 1759. Her version became the standard French translation of the Principia and remains the only complete translation into French.

Despite her prominence in 18th-century European intellectual life, Du Châtelet's scientific and philosophical reputation later became closely associated with Voltaire, her intellectual collaborator and romantic partner for 16 years. Historical accounts have often treated her accomplishments within the context of Voltaire's life and work. More than two centuries after her death, scholars in the late 20th and early 21st centuries increasingly reassessed her scientific and philosophical work independently of that relationship.

Du Châtelet also studied language and grammer in addition to mathematics and physics. She wrote an unpublished work called Grammaire raisonnée, which explored how language relates to human thought and understanding. Most of the work has been lost, but three chapters have survived. This shows that her interests extended beyond science and philosophy into the study of language.

== Other contributions ==
=== Development of financial derivatives ===
Du Châtelet lost the considerable sum for the time of 84,000 francs—some of it borrowed—in one evening at the table at the Court of Fontainebleau, to card cheats. To raise the money to pay back her debts, she devised an ingenious financing arrangement similar to modern derivatives, whereby she paid tax collectors a fairly low sum for the right to their future earnings (they were allowed to keep a portion of the taxes they collected for the King), and promised to pay the court gamblers part of these future earnings.

== Legacy ==
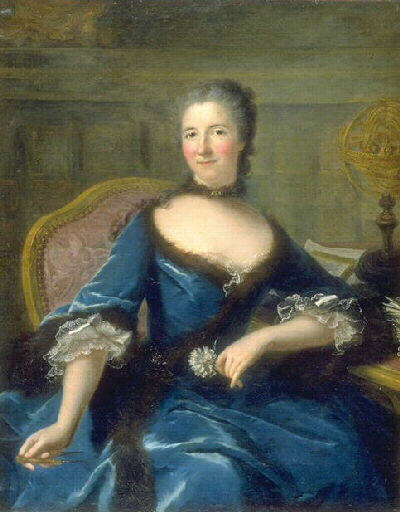
Portrait by Marianne Loir. Musée des Beaux-Arts de Bordeaux

Du Châtelet made foundational contributions to modern physics and Enlightenment philosophy, most notably by deriving the principle of conservation of energy and synthesizing Leibinizian metaphysics with Newtonian mechanics in her Institutions de Physique. In addition to her original theoretical work, she produced the definitive French translation and commentary of Newton's Principia, remaining the only complete French rendition to date.

A main-belt minor planet and a crater on Venus have been named in her honor, and she is the subject of three plays: Legacy of Light by Karen Zacarías; Émilie: La Marquise Du Châtelet Defends Her Life Tonight by Lauren Gunderson and Urania: the Life of Émilie du Châtelet by Jyl Bonaguro. The opera Émilie by Kaija Saariaho is about the last moments of her life.

Du Châtelet is often represented in portraits with mathematical iconography, such as holding a pair of dividers or a page of geometrical calculations. In the early nineteenth century, a French pamphlet of celebrated women (Femmes célèbres) introduced a possibly apocryphal story of her childhood. According to this story, a servant fashioned a doll for her by dressing up wooden dividers as a doll; however, du Châtelet undressed the dividers, and intuiting their original purpose, drew a circle with them.

The Institut Émilie du Châtelet, which was founded in France in 2006, supports "the development and diffusion of research on women, sex, and gender".

Since 2016, the French Society of Physics (la Société Française de Physique) has awarded the Émilie Du Châtelet Prize to a physicist or team of researchers for excellence in Physics.

Duke University also presents an annual Du Châtelet Prize in Philosophy of Physics "for previously unpublished work in philosophy of physics by a graduate student or junior scholar".

On December 17, 2021, Google Doodle honored du Châtelet.

Poet Jessy Randall's 2022 collection Mathematics for Ladies includes a poem honoring du Châtelet.

Émilie du Châtelet was portrayed by the actress Hélène de Fougerolles in the docudrama Einstein's Big Idea.

== Works ==
Scientific

- Dissertation sur la nature et la propagation du feu (1st edition, 1739; 2nd edition, 1744)
- Institutions de physique (1st edition, 1740; 2nd edition, 1742)
- Istituzioni di Fisica di Madama la Marchesa du Chastelet Indiritte a suofi Gliuolo. Traduzione dal Linguaggio Francese nel Toscano, Accresciuta con la Dissertazione Sopra le Forze Motrizi di M. de Mairan. Venice: Presso Giambatista Pascali (1743).
- Der Frau Marquisinn von Chastellet Naturlehre an ihren Sohn. Erster Theilnach der Zweyten Französischen Ausgabe Übersetzet von Wolfgang Balthasar Adolf von Steinwehr Prof. Publ. Ord. auf der Universitet zu Frankfurt an der Oder, Derselben Bibliothekarin, und der Königl. Preußischen Societät der Wissenschaften Mitglied. Halle/Leipzig: Rengerische Buchhandlung (1743).
- Principes mathématiques de la philosophie naturelle par feue Madame la Marquise du Châtelet (1st edition, 1756; 2nd edition, 1759)

Other

- Examen de la Genèse
- Examen des Livres du Nouveau Testament
- Discours sur le bonheur

== See also ==
- Timeline of women in science
