= Vis viva =

Historical concept in physics

Vis viva (from the Latin for "living force") describes a quantity similar to kinetic energy in an early formulation of the principle of conservation of energy. The term has since been deprecated.

== Overview ==
Proposed by Gottfried Leibniz over the period 1676–1689, the theory was controversial as it seemed to oppose the theory of conservation of quantity of motion advocated by René Descartes. Descartes's quantity of motion was different from momentum, but Newton defined the quantity of motion as the conjunction of the quantity of matter and velocity in Definition II of his Principia. In Definition III, he defined the force that resists a change in motion as the vis inertia of Descartes. Newton's third law of motion (for every action there is an equal and opposite reaction) is also equivalent to the principle of conservation of momentum. Leibniz accepted the principle of conservation of momentum, but rejected the Cartesian version of it. The difference between these ideas was whether the quantity of motion was simply related to a body's resistance to a change in velocity (vis inertia) or whether a body's amount of force due to its motion (vis viva) was related to the square of its velocity.

The theory was eventually absorbed into the modern theory of energy, though the term still survives in the context of celestial mechanics through the vis viva equation. The English equivalent "living force" was also used, for example by George William Hill.

The term is due to the German philosopher Gottfried Wilhelm Leibniz, who was the first to attempt a mathematical formulation from 1676 to 1689. However, about ten years earlier, Christiaan Huygens was the first to notice that in many mechanical systems (of several masses, m_{i} each with velocity v_{i}) the quantity

$\sum_{i} m_i v_i^2$

was conserved. Leibniz called this very quantity the vis viva or "living force" of the system. The principle represented an accurate statement of the conservation of kinetic energy in elastic collisions that was independent of the conservation of momentum.

However, many physicists at the time were unaware of this fact and, instead, were influenced by the prestige of Sir Isaac Newton in England and of René Descartes in France, both of whom advanced the conservation of momentum as a guiding principle. Thus the momentum:

$\,\!\sum_{i} m_i \mathbf{v}_i$

was held by the rival camp to be the conserved vis viva. It was largely engineers such as John Smeaton, Peter Ewart, Karl Holtzmann, Gustave-Adolphe Hirn and Marc Seguin who objected that conservation of momentum alone was not adequate for practical calculation and who made use of Leibniz's principle. The principle was also championed by some chemists such as William Hyde Wollaston.

The French mathematician Émilie du Châtelet, who had a sound grasp of Newtonian mechanics, developed Leibniz's concept and, combining it with the observations of Willem 's Gravesande, showed that vis viva was dependent on the square of the velocities.

Members of the academic establishment such as John Playfair were quick to point out that kinetic energy is clearly not conserved. This is obvious to a modern analysis based on the second law of thermodynamics, but in the 18th and 19th centuries, the fate of the lost energy was still unknown. Gradually it came to be suspected that the heat inevitably generated by motion was another form of vis viva. In 1783, Antoine Lavoisier and Pierre-Simon Laplace reviewed the two competing theories of vis viva and caloric theory. Count Rumford's 1798 observations of heat generation during the boring of cannons added more weight to the view that mechanical motion could be converted into heat. Vis viva began to be known as energy after Thomas Young first used the term in 1807.

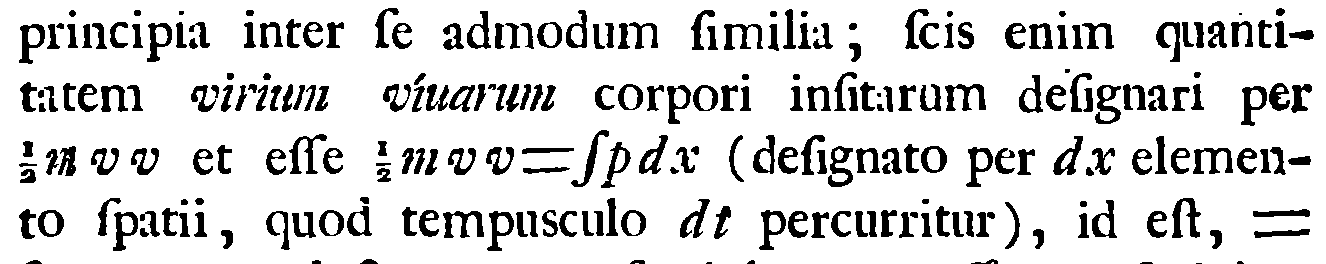
An excerpt from Daniel Bernoulli's article, dated 1736, with the definition of vis viva with 1/2 multiplier.

The recalibration of vis viva to include the coefficient of a half, namely:

$E = \frac {1} {2}\sum_{i} m_i v_i^2$

was largely the result of the work of Gaspard-Gustave Coriolis and Jean-Victor Poncelet over the period 1819–1839, although the present-day definition can occasionally be found earlier (e.g., in Daniel Bernoulli's texts). The former called it the quantité de travail (quantity of work) and the latter, travail mécanique (mechanical work) and both championed its use in engineering calculation.

== See also ==
- Conservation of energy: Historical development
- Élan vital
- Kinetic energy
- Orthogenesis
- Potentiality and actuality
- Vis-viva equation
