= Pierre Desfontaines =

French writer and critic (1685–1745)

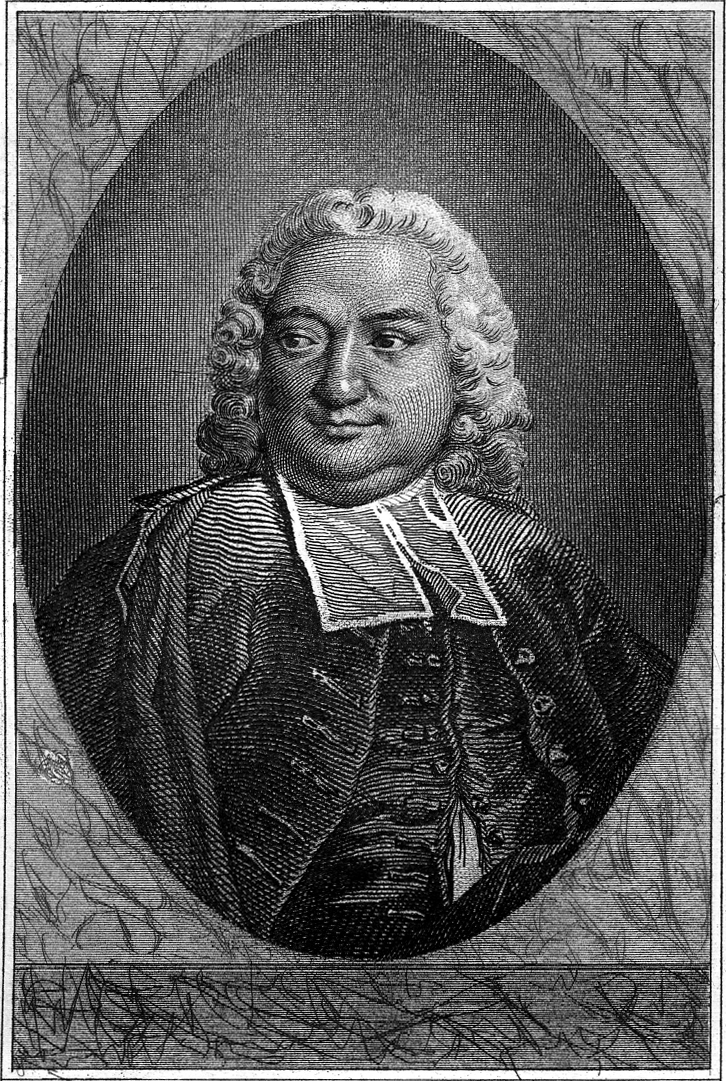
Pierre Desfontaines

The Abbé Pierre François Guyot-Desfontaines (French pronunciation: [pjɛʁ fʁɑ̃swa ɡɥijo defɔ̃tɛn]; 1685 in Rouen – 16 December 1745 in Paris) was a French journalist, translator and popular historian.

Known today for his quarrels with Voltaire, Desfontaines can be regarded as the founder of the new literary criticism and journalism in France, insofar as he sought to found his criticism on aesthetic and ethical lines, rather than merely summarising, reproducing or paraphrasing.

== Biography ==
Desfontaines entered the order of Jesuits after being raised by them, and taught rhetoric in Bourges before devoting himself exclusively to letters until 1715. In 1724, he became a contributor to the Journal des sçavans, attempting to introduce an amenity of style into his scientific articles, avoiding dryness and pedantry.

He then published, with various collaborators such as Élie Fréron, Granet, the Abbé Destrées, periodical collections of criticism: Le Nouvelliste du Parnasse [The Short-Story Writer of Parnassus] (1731–1734, 5 vols.), and Observations sur les écrits modernes [Observations on modern writing] (1735 on, 34 vols.). These hastily written periodicals distinguished themselves by the vivacity of their criticism and partisanship.

Desfontaines notably attacked the dramatic works of Voltaire, who had earlier helped clear the abbé's name when, accused of sodomy, he spent time in prison in 1724, and had also used his influence to help him return to Paris after his exile. Voltaire retorted with a lampoon entitled Le Préservatif, ou critique des Observations sur les écrits modernes [The Counterpoison, or criticism on Observations on modern writing] (1738), which Desfontaines answered anonymously with a short satirical writing entitled La Voltairomanie (1738), which compiled all the scandalous anecdotes defaming its author at the time. This last saw a libel action which Voltaire only gave up after Desfontaines repudiated the work in the Amsterdam Gazette of 4 April 1739. The war continued several years, so that today the memory of Desfontaines is only perpetuated by the epigrams of Voltaire, and those of Alexis Piron, a one-time ally of Voltaire who promised to bring the abbé an epigram every morning, and did so for fifty days.

== Works ==
- Apologie du caractère des Anglois et des François [Apology for the character of the English and the French], 1725
- Dictionnaire néologique à l'usage des beaux esprits du siècle [Neological dictionary for the use of modern wits], 1726
- Lettres d'un rat calotin à Citron Barbet; Relation de ce qui s’est passé au sujet de l'illustre Mathanasius à l'Académie françoise, [Letters of a churchgoing rat at Citron Barbet; Account of what happened on the subject of the famous Mathanasius at the Académie françoise] 1727
- Translation of Jonathan Swift's Gulliver's Travels, 1727
- Entretiens sur les Voyages de Cyrus, [Talks on the Voyages of Cyrus] 1728
- Nouvelle Histoire de France par demandes et par réponses [New history of France by questions and answers], 1730
- Le Nouveau Gulliver, [The New Gulliver] 1730
- Nouvelle Histoire de France, [New History of France] 1730
- La Voltairomanie, 1738
- Racine vengé, ou examen des remarques de l'abbé d'Olivet sur les œuvres de Racine, [Racine avenged, or examination of the remarks of the abbé of Olivet on the works of Racine] 1739. "E-text" (in French). Archived from the original on 2007-03-11.
- Traduction en prose des poèmes de Virgile [Prose translation of the poems of Virgil], 1743
- Lettre d'un comédien françois au sujet de l'Histoire du théâtre italien [Letter of a French actor on the History of the Italian theatre]
