= Gustave-Adolphe Hirn =

French physicist, astronomer, mathematician, and engineer

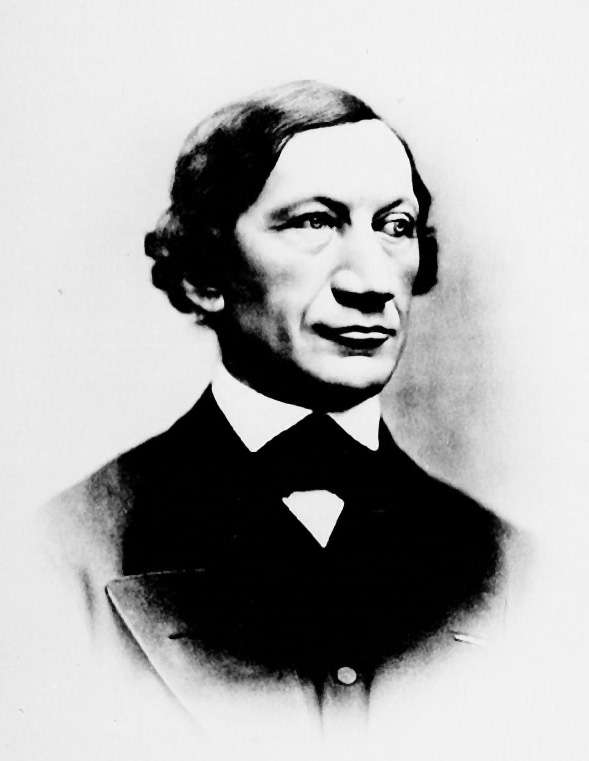
- Photograph of Hirn c. 1884 – 1890
- Born: 21 August 1815; Logelbach, Haut-Rhin, France
- Died: 14 January 1890 (aged 74); Colmar, Haut-Rhin, France
- Awards: Chevalier of the Légion d'Honneur (1865)
- Scientific career
- Fields: Physics, astronomy, engineering

Signature
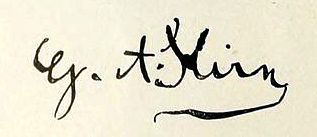

Gustave-Adolphe Hirn (21 August 1815 – 14 January 1890) was a French physicist, astronomer, mathematician, and engineer who made important measurements of the mechanical equivalent of heat and contributions to the early development of thermodynamics. He further applied his science in the practical development of steam engines.

== Life ==
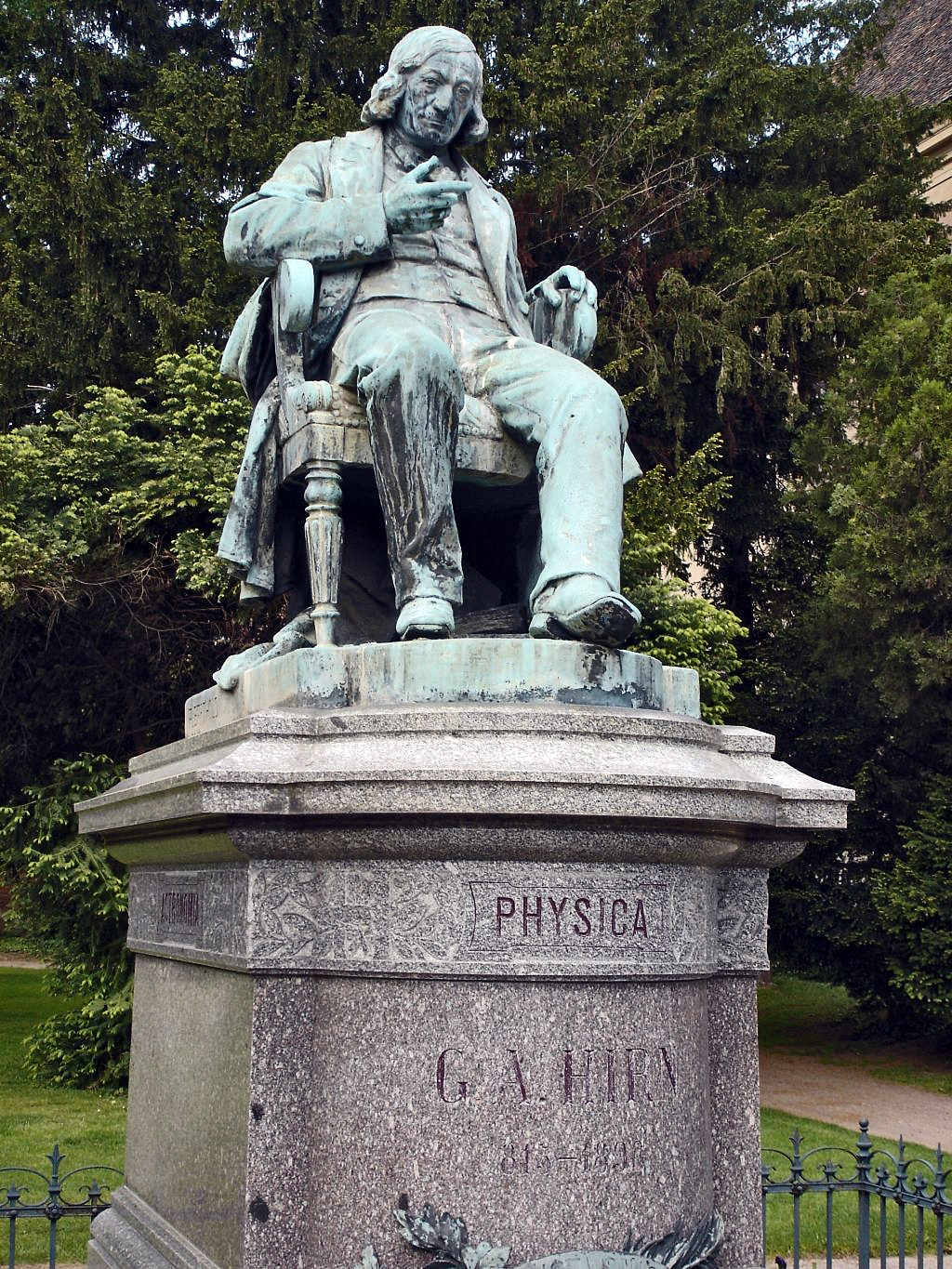
Frédéric Bartholdi's sculpture of Gustave-Adolphe Hirn in Colmar

Hirn was born in Logelbach, near Colmar, into the prosperous textile-manufacturing family Haussmann. Baron Haussmann was a cousin. At 19, he entered his grandfather's cotton factory as a chemist. Later he worked as an engineer, and began research on mechanics, especially on calorics.

Hirn carried out numerous experiments during his career, demonstrating the relevance of Carnot's principle in animated engines: the equivalence of thermal and mechanical energy. He traced the flow of energy through the steam engine, documenting its distribution and the disposal of heat; he collaborated extensively with Octave Hallauer to measure this distribution. He studied the properties of superheated steam and was the first to employ it at large scale.

His work on thermodynamics is considered a major work of the 19th century. Indeed, he deduced from his work an equation of state that introduced both the notion of free volume and internal pressure, notions that would reappear with the work of van der Waals with a different corpuscular conception.

He was made a member of the French Academy of Sciences in 1867; in 1880 founded a meteorological observatory near Colmar; and later devoted himself to astronomy. Hirn was educated in the shop, and his works are marked by much practical criticism of mere academic theory.

Hirn invented the pandynanometer in 1880 and published a theory of the origin and chemical composition of Saturn's rings, exchanging correspondence with Urbain Jean Joseph Leverrier.

The American Society of Mechanical Engineers elected Hirn an honorary member in 1882. In 1886, he was elected a member of the American Philosophical Society.

He made significant contributions to the field of tribology. His study of friction in journal bearings revealed all the essential features of fluid film lubrication, although it lacked theoretical justification. For this contribution, he was named as one of the 23 "Men of Tribology" by Duncan Dowson.

He died in Colmar in 1890.

== Honours ==
- Chevalier of the Légion d'Honneur (1865)
- Elected Honorary Member of the Manchester Literary and Philosophical Society (1888)

== Bibliography ==
- Hirn, G.-A. (1849). "Nouvelles recherches sur le frottement des corps solides" [New research on the friction of solid bodies]. Comptes rendus hebdomadaires des séances de l'Académie des sciences (in French). 28: 290.
- —— (1854). "Etudes sur les principaux phénomènes que présentent les frottements médias et sur les diverses manières de déterminer la valeur mécanique des matières employées au graissage des machines" [Studies on the main phenomena exhibited by media friction and on the various ways of determining the mechanical value of the materials used in the lubrication of machines]. Bulletin de la Société Industrielle de Mulhouse (in French). 26: 202.
- —— (1854). "Notice sur les lois de la production du calorique par les frottements médiats" [Note on the laws of caloric production by mediate friction]. Bulletin de la Société Industrielle de Mulhouse (in French). 26: 238.
- —— (1862). Théorie mécanique de la chaleur [Mechanical theory of heat] (in French). Paris: Lieber.
- —— (1863). Exposition analytique et expérimentale de la théorie de la chaleur [Analytical and experimental exposition of the theory of heat] (in French). Paris: Mallet-Bachelet.
- —— (1868). Conséquences philosophiques et métaphysiques de la thermodynamique; Analyse élémentaire de l'univers [Philosophical and metaphysical consequences of thermodynamics; Elemental analysis of the universe] (in French). Paris: Gauthier-Villars.
- —— (1870). Les paradynamometres [Paradynamometers] (in French).
- —— (1872). Mémoire sur les anneaux de Saturne [Memoir on the rings of Saturn] (in French).
- —— (1878). Étude sur une classe particuliere de tourbillons [Study on a particular class of vortices] (in French).
- —— (1882). "Recherches expérimentales sur la relation qui existe entre la résistance de l'air et sa température" [Experimental research on the relation which exists between the resistance of the air and its temperature]. Mémoires de l'Académie royale des sciences, des lettres et des Beaux-Arts de Belgique (in French). 43: 1–99. hdl:2268.1/2630.
- —— (1882). La vie future et la science moderne [Future life and modern science] (in French). Colmar: Eugène Barth.
- —— (1887). "La thermodynamique et le travail chez les êtres vivants" [Thermodynamics and work in living beings]. Revue Scientifique (in French). 39 (22). Paris: Bureau des revues: 673–684.
- —— (1889). Constitution de l'espace celeste [Constitution of celestial space] (in French). Colmar: Eugène Barth.
