= Louis Nicolas le Tonnelier de Breteuil =

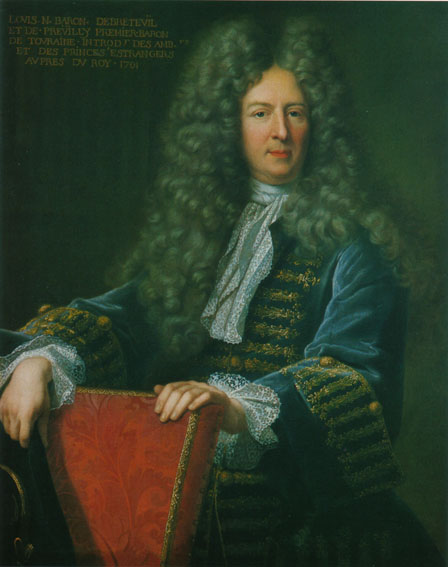
The baron of Breteuil by Hyacinthe Rigaud

Louis Nicolas Le Tonnelier, Baron of Breteuil (14 September 1648, in Montpellier, Languedoc – 24 May 1728), baron of Preuilly and of Breteuil was an officer in the royal household of Louis XIV. He is also notable as the father of the mathematician Émilie du Châtelet.

== Biography ==
Louis Nicolas Le Tonnelier was the youngest son of Louis Le Tonnelier de Breteuil (1609–1685).

Former King's reader, he was sent in 1682 by Louis XIV to the Duke of Mantua as envoy. His mission was to ensure the application of the secret treaty signed with him, to monitor him and to assess France's chances in Mantua and Montferrat.

Recalled to Paris in 1684, he sold his office as the King's reader and became, in 1698, the Introducer of the Ambassadors. Breteuil remained introducer until 1715 when he sold his office for 250,000 pounds to Joseph Magny, Marquis de Foucault.

In 1697, Louis Nicolas Le Tonnelier married Gabrielle Anne de Froulay (1670–1740), daughter of soldier Charles de Froulay (1601–1671). He is the father of the Marquise du Châtelet and the Abbé de Breteuil.

By others children was René-Alexandre le Tonnelier de Breteuil (1698–1720) and Charles-Auguste le Tonnelier de Breteuil (1701–1731), which subsequently he became a father of aristocrat, diplomat and statesman Louis Auguste Le Tonnelier de Breteuil (1730–1807).

He became an introducer when he was not yet a noble. In 1699, he bought the land of Preuilly, the first barony of Touraine, from which he took the title. In 1706, he obtained the authorization to bear the name of de Breteuil alone, or with that of de Preuilly.

== Bibliography ==
- Marie-Lan Nguyen, Les officiers de la Maison du Roi et le cérémonial public de Henri III à Louis XVI
- Breteuil, Louis Nicolas Le Tonnelier. 1858. Mémoires du Baron de Breteuil, introducteur des ambassadeurs à la court de Louis XIV.
