= Le Tonnelier de Breteuil =

Coat of Arms of Le Tonnelier de Breteuil family

The Le Tonnelier de Breteuil family was an influential and powerful French noble family, originated in Beauvais, northern France, whose members held many important political and military positions throughout history of the Kingdom of France.

The family was ennobled in 1582 and throughout centuries rose in prominence, being awarded the titles of Marquis, Count and Baron in France.

See Le Tonnelier for the list of notable members.
