= Château de Cirey =

Château in Upper Marne department, France

Coordinates: 48°19′47″N 04°56′22″E

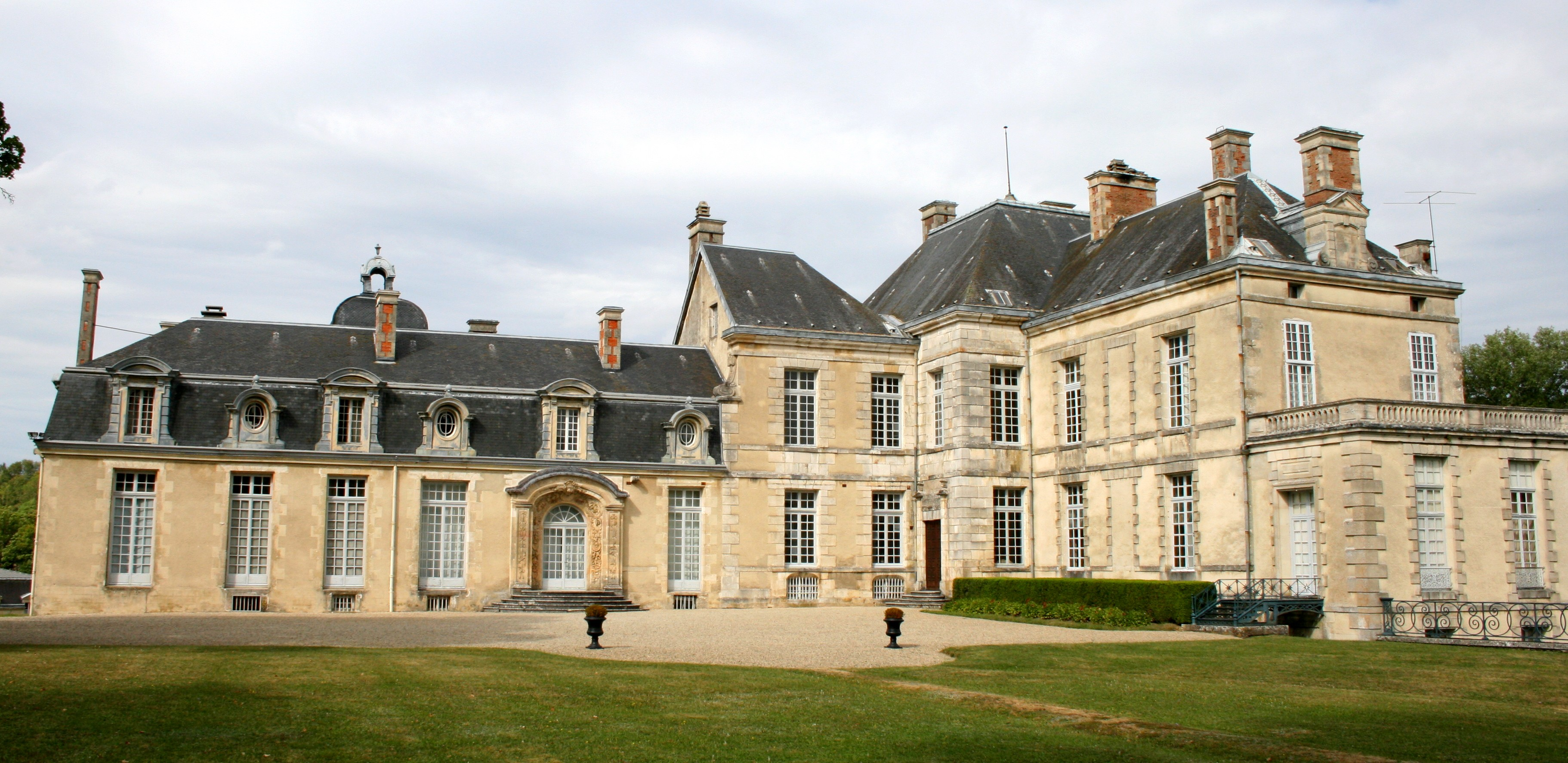
Château de Cirey

The Château de Cirey is a château in Cirey-sur-Blaise, Haute-Marne, France (not to be confused with Bellevaux Abbey in Haute-Saône, sometimes also referred to as the chateau of Cirey-lès-Bellevaux). The château was the home of Émilie du Châtelet and her lover Voltaire from 1734 to 1749.

Today the château is owned by the count of Salignac-Fénelon. Various parts of the building and its interiors have been protected as a monument historique since 21 September 1981.

== History ==
In the 17th century the seigneurie of Cirey was held by a member of an influential family from Lorraine, Louis-Jules du Châtelet. He held an official post at the French court and was governor of Aigues-Mortes. However he sided with Gaston, Duke of Orléans in his intrigues against Louis XIII, fell from favour and was condemned to death by quartering. All his property was confiscated and he fled to escape execution. His wife Christine de Gleiseneuve succeeded in regaining the seigneurie, but could not prevent the 11th century castle from being slighted in 1633.

When Louis XIII and his brothers were reconciled in 1634, Louis-Jules was amnestied and returned to his estates. In 1642 he began building a new house in the baroque style in the foundations of the old castle. Before his death in 1671, only one tower and an extension were built, of the planned structure with four towers and three wings.

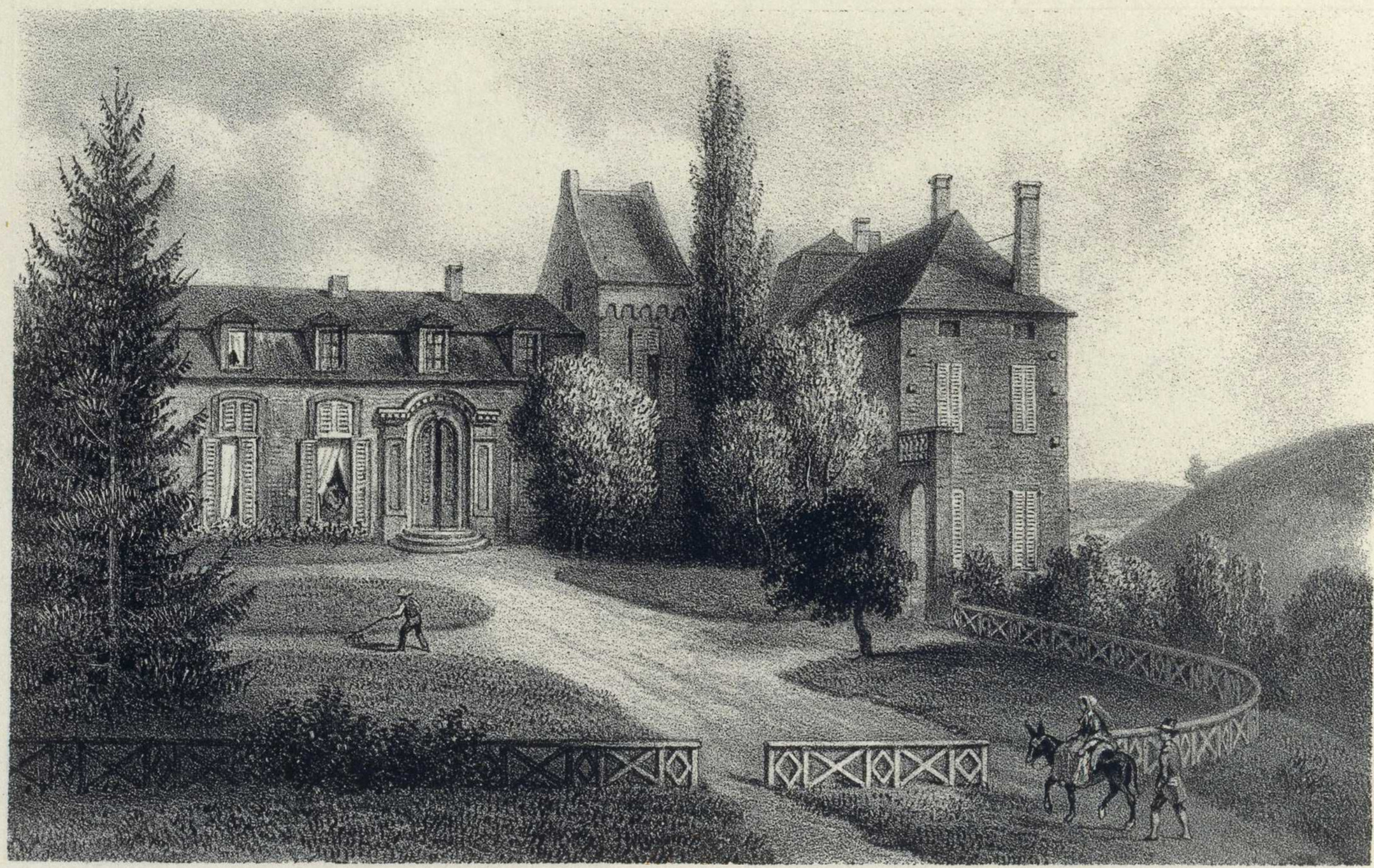
Château de Cirey in a lithograph of 1854.

The castle became famous in the first half of the 18th century when it was the home of the Marquis Florent-Claude du Châtelet, Count of Lemout, Seigneur von Cirey. He was a lieutenant general in the army of Louis XV and had married the 18 year-old Émilie Le Tonnelier de Breteuil in 1724. The couple had three children before Émilie met Voltaire in Paris in 1733 and began a relationship with him. With the consent of the Marquis, Voltaire moved to Cirey.

When Voltaire arrived in 1734 he found a somewhat run-down building in the style of Louis XIII in red brick and pale stone. He set renovations in hand, and between 1734 and 1735 he had a new wing built, in which the couple installed their laboratory and a library of 21,000 books. In the following years, until the early death of Madame du Châtelet in 1749, Cirey was a meeting point for literati and intellectuals from every part of France.

From Émilie’s son Louis Marie Florent du Châtelet, later duke of Châtelet, the chateau passed to his niece, later Madame de Simiane, Diane-Adélaïde de Damas, who received La Fayette there many times. Her heirs in the Damas d'Antigny family sold the property to a merchant, who sold it on in 1890 to a pen owner named Armand-Viellard, ancestor of the present owner.

== Description ==
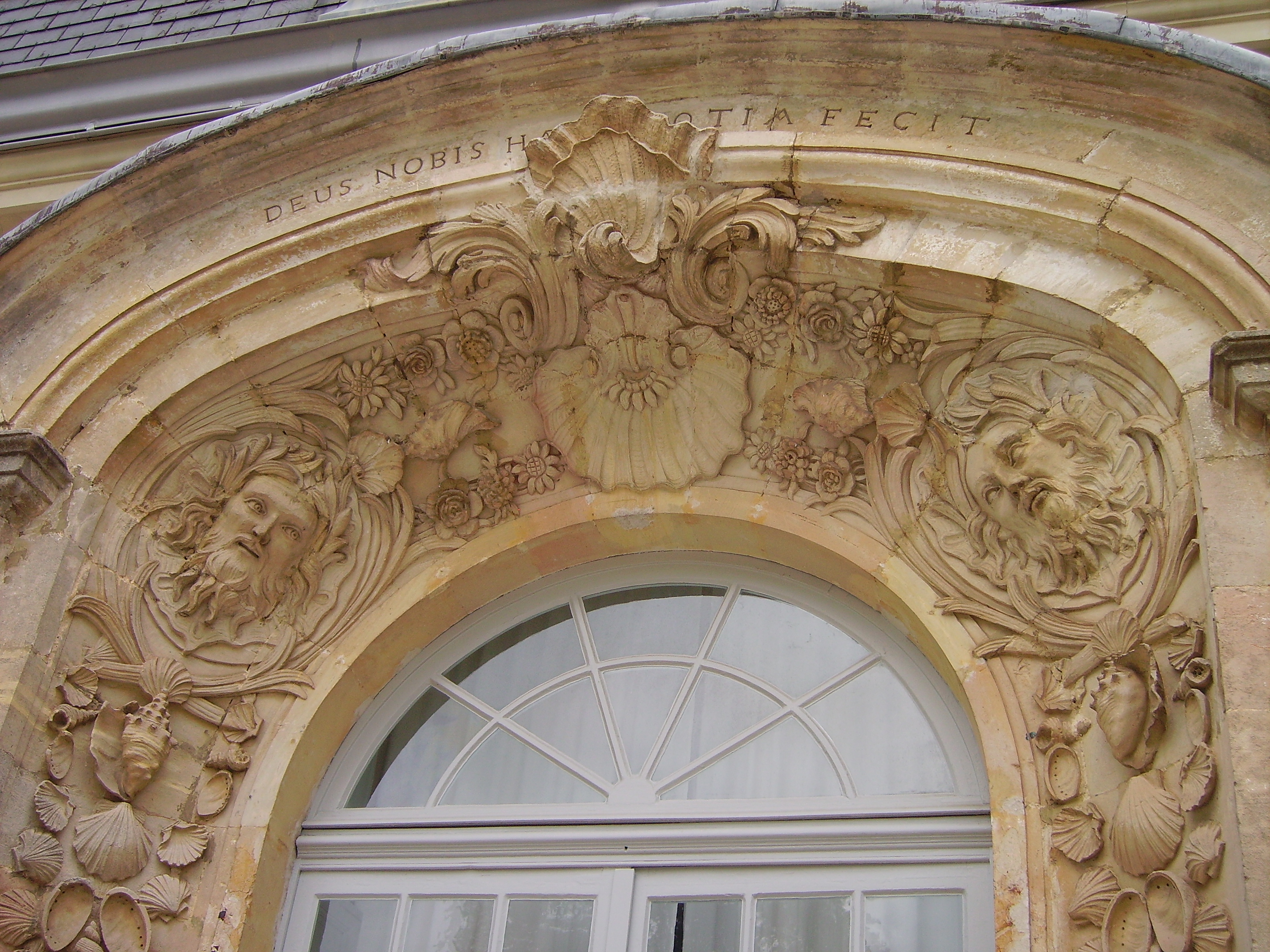
Part of the rich decoration in the gallery wing Teil

The chateau stands on the bank of the river Blaise and consists of the main building and a large southwestern outer bailey. Together with several other buildings, these structures all lie within an English landscape garden.

The main chateau building consists of a large pavilion tower with a square floor plan and a tented roof. Connected to this on the south side is an extension, built in the 17th century at the same time as the tower. The L-shaped gallery wing, which adjoins the pavilion on its west side, dates from the 18th century. It has an elaborately designed portal that was built according to Voltaire's designs, with reliefs indicating his interest in the sciences, philosophy and the arts.

One of the oldest private theaters in France is located on the top floor, set up by Voltaire in 1735 to rehearse the plays he wrote during those years. A short northern extension to the pavilion dates back to the 19th century, as does the castle chapel, whose wall paintings date from 1851 and were executed by Constant Ménissier. Inside, much of the valuable furnishings from the 17th and 18th centuries has been preserved, for example the dado and panelling in the billiard room and an oven in the dining room.

Almost all of the castle's outbuildings date from the second half of the 19th century and are located around a rectangular inner courtyard, through whose driveway in the southwest corner the castle grounds can be entered. Access to the main castle is via a pavilion-like gatehouse with a round arched archway on the east side of the service yard. However, the building is not part of the original baroque development, but was only erected in 1915. The various buildings we’re formerly used as a stable and chicken coop, granary, dovecote, barn, shepherd's house and cattle shed. An icehouse has also been preserved.

The chateau complex includes a large landscaped garden, dating back to the mid-15th century. Since 26 December 2001 it has been separately protected as a monument historique. The castle park has an approximately 566 meter long canal that is fed by the river Blaise. A metal bridge from 1880 leads over it. In addition to an orangery building, there is also a chalet in the park in a typical 19th century style.

== Bibliography ==
- Claude Fregnac: Merveilles des châteaux d'Alsace, de Lorraine, de Champagne, des provinces de Liège, de Limbourg et de Luxembourg. Hachette, Paris 1974, ISBN 2-01-000465-5, pp.192–195
- Jean-Marie Pérouse de Montclos (editor): Le guide du patrimoine Champagne Ardenne. Hachette, Paris 1995, ISBN 2-01-020987-7
