= Bitschwiller-lès-Thann =

Commune in Grand Est, France

- Commune
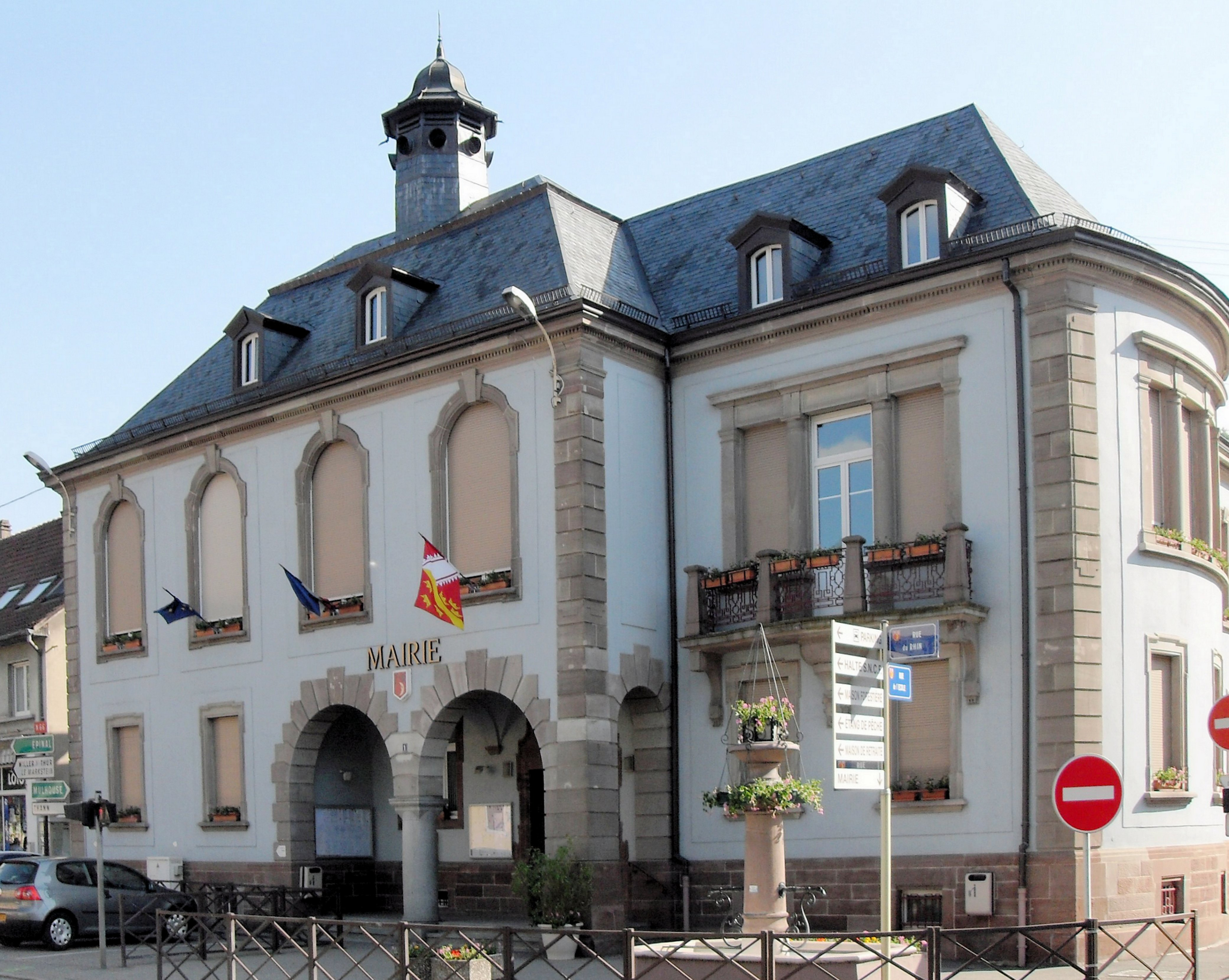
- The town hall in Bitschwiller-lès-Thann

- Coat of arms
- Location of Bitschwiller-lès-Thann
- Location within France Location within Grand Est
- Coordinates: 47°49′51″N 7°04′52″E
- Country: France
- Region: Grand Est
- Department: Haut-Rhin
- Arrondissement: Thann-Guebwiller
- Canton: Cernay

Government
  - Mayor (2020–2026): Pascal Ferrari
- Area^{1}: 12.64 km^{2} (4.88 sq mi)
- Elevation: 360 m (1,180 ft)
- Highest elevation: 1,183 m (3,881 ft)
- Lowest elevation: 344 m (1,129 ft)
- Population (2023): 1,986
  - Density: 157.1/km^{2} (406.9/sq mi)
- Time zone: UTC+01:00 (CET)
  - Summer (DST): UTC+02:00 (CEST)
- INSEE/Postal code: 68040 /68620
- ^{1} French Land Register data, which excludes lakes, ponds, glaciers > 1 km^{2} (0.386 sq mi or 247 acres) and river estuaries.

Bitschwiller-lès-Thann (French pronunciation: [bitʃvilɛʁ lɛ tan], literally Bitschwiller near Thann; German: Bitschweiler) is a commune in the Haut-Rhin department in Grand Est in north-eastern France.

The town lies in the Thur river valley near the Vosges mountains.

== History ==
The town is first mentioned about 1250. Before the early 1900s the town was known only as Bitschwiller. It was destroyed by Norman mercenaries during the Hundred Years' War. By 1624 about 100 people lived in this village.

Immigrants from Germany and Switzerland arrived during the 1650s. The entire Alsace region was fought over many times between the French and Germans. Germany ruled this area (including Bitschwiller) in 1874–1918 and again 1940–1945.

This was and continues to be an industrialised area. Iron mining began in the 1470s but only for a short while. Mining returned in 1735 and a metalworks was built. A foundry opened in 1739. A weaving factory opened in 1826. As the industrialization continued, steam engines and locomotives were built beginning in 1836, although rail lines did not yet come to Bitschwiller and the locomotives were transported from Bitschwiller by oxen.

The Dampf Pfifla (or steam whistle) was invented there about 1836.

On 25 October 1838 the first locomotive ever built by French engineers was tried on the St. Cloud and Paris Railway. Its name was the Alsace. The locomotive was a success, attaining a speed of about 33 miles per hour. It was built at the manufacturing plant of Messrs. Stehelin and Huber, in Bitschwiller. The firm was large enough to supply locomotives at a rate of 12 per year at that time.

The Catholic Church named St. Alphonse is in Bitschwiller, whose famous Callinet organ dates back to 1838. Alsace has over 1350 organs and has been called the world capital of the organ.

The peak of population was 3,379 people in 1856.

Smaller surrounding villages include Erzenbach, Busenbach and Wickenbaechle.

Emigration began about 1845–1846 and continued for over 20 years. Currently the village population is about 2,000 people.

== Geography ==
The elevation near the town center is about 357m but rises quickly to as high as 920m within 1.5 km (0.93 mi). The town lies roughly north-northwest to south-southeast along the Thur River with the main road leading through town this way. The surrounding hillsides are forested.

=== Climate ===
Bitschwiller-lès-Thann has an oceanic climate (Köppen climate classification Cfb). The average annual temperature in Bitschwiller-lès-Thann is 9.7 °C (49.5 °F). The average annual rainfall is 1,333.1 mm (52.48 in) with December as the wettest month. The temperatures are highest on average in July, at around 18.3 °C (64.9 °F), and lowest in January, at around 1.3 °C (34.3 °F). The highest temperature ever recorded in Bitschwiller-lès-Thann was 38.9 °C (102.0 °F) on 7 August 2015; the coldest temperature ever recorded was −16.9 °C (1.6 °F) on 12 January 1987.

Climate data for Bitschwiller-lès-Thann (1981–2010 averages, extremes 1987−2021)
Month	Jan	Feb	Mar	Apr	May	Jun	Jul	Aug	Sep	Oct	Nov	Dec	Year
Record high °C (°F)	16.4 (61.5)	20.8 (69.4)	26.6 (79.9)	29.8 (85.6)	33.5 (92.3)	36.9 (98.4)	38.2 (100.8)	38.9 (102.0)	33.2 (91.8)	29.0 (84.2)	22.7 (72.9)	20.5 (68.9)	38.9 (102.0)
Mean daily maximum °C (°F)	4.5 (40.1)	6.6 (43.9)	10.6 (51.1)	14.9 (58.8)	19.5 (67.1)	22.8 (73.0)	25.0 (77.0)	24.5 (76.1)	20.1 (68.2)	15.1 (59.2)	8.4 (47.1)	4.8 (40.6)	14.8 (58.6)
Daily mean °C (°F)	1.3 (34.3)	2.5 (36.5)	5.5 (41.9)	8.9 (48.0)	13.3 (55.9)	16.3 (61.3)	18.3 (64.9)	17.9 (64.2)	14.2 (57.6)	10.4 (50.7)	4.9 (40.8)	1.9 (35.4)	9.7 (49.5)
Mean daily minimum °C (°F)	−2.0 (28.4)	−1.6 (29.1)	0.5 (32.9)	2.9 (37.2)	7.0 (44.6)	9.7 (49.5)	11.7 (53.1)	11.3 (52.3)	8.4 (47.1)	5.6 (42.1)	1.3 (34.3)	−1.0 (30.2)	4.5 (40.1)
Record low °C (°F)	−19.5 (−3.1)	−18.0 (−0.4)	−18.1 (−0.6)	−7.1 (19.2)	−2.2 (28.0)	0.3 (32.5)	3.2 (37.8)	1.5 (34.7)	−1.0 (30.2)	−6.2 (20.8)	−13.7 (7.3)	−19.4 (−2.9)	−19.5 (−3.1)
Average precipitation mm (inches)	151.2 (5.95)	125.4 (4.94)	117.8 (4.64)	82.2 (3.24)	99.2 (3.91)	92.8 (3.65)	91.5 (3.60)	85.0 (3.35)	88.1 (3.47)	126.7 (4.99)	112.6 (4.43)	160.6 (6.32)	1,333.1 (52.48)
Average precipitation days (≥ 1.0 mm)	12.1	11.3	13.0	11.3	14.1	12.3	11.1	11.2	10.2	12.1	12.0	13.2	144.0
Source: Meteociel

== Population ==
Historical population

Year	Pop.	±% p.a.
1793	1,700	—
1800	795	−10.29%
1806	854	+1.20%
1821	1,096	+1.68%
1831	1,610	+3.92%
1836	2,645	+10.44%
1841	2,776	+0.97%
1846	2,903	+0.90%
1851	2,948	+0.31%
1856	3,379	+2.77%
1861	3,215	−0.99%
1866	2,830	−2.52%
1871	2,840	+0.07%
1875	2,571	−2.46%
1880	2,218	−2.91%
1885	2,164	−0.49%
1890	2,191	+0.25%
1895	2,141	−0.46%
1900	2,355	+1.92%

Year	Pop.	±% p.a.
1905	2,312	−0.37%
1910	2,316	+0.03%
1921	2,068	−1.02%
1926	2,034	−0.33%
1931	2,019	−0.15%
1936	1,918	−1.02%
1946	1,752	−0.90%
1954	1,889	+0.95%
1962	2,229	+2.09%
1968	2,169	−0.45%
1975	2,117	−0.35%
1982	1,922	−1.37%
1990	2,052	+0.82%
1999	2,123	+0.38%
2007	2,164	+0.24%
2012	1,991	−1.65%
2017	1,960	−0.31%
2023	1,986	+0.22%

Source: EHESS and INSEE (1968–2023)

== Family names from and around Bitschwiller-lès-Thann ==
Bogenstahl, Freyburger, Gasser, Grunenwald, Gstalter, Haller, Kutter, Khlogner, Mandleur, Munsch, Naegelin, Nusbaum, Olanie, Olanier, Rebischung, Scherrer, Schilling, Schmidt, Schen, Storcklin, Tschaen, Welckle, Weishart, Wogenstahl.

== Heraldry ==
Birschwiller-lès-Thann	Blazon: Gules, a gold moon supporting on the right a miner's pick placed bendwise, the point on the left turned downwards, on the left a cogwheel, all argent.

== See also ==
- Communes of the Haut-Rhin department
