= Letters on the English =

Series of essays by Voltaire

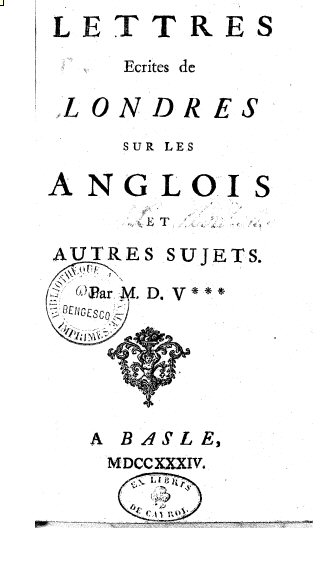
- Title page from 1734 edition of Letters on the English
- Author: Voltaire
- Original title: Lettres philosophiques
- Language: French
- Subject: Philosophy
- Publisher: Basel
- Publication date: 1734
- Publication place: France
- English publication date: 1733
- Media type: Print

Letters on the English (or Letters Concerning the English Nation; French: Lettres philosophiques) are a series of essays written by Voltaire based on his experiences living in Great Britain between 1726 and 1729. The book was published first in English in 1733 and then in French the following year, where it was seen as an attack on the French system of government and was rapidly suppressed.

A revised edition appeared in English in 1778 as Lettres philosophiques sur les Anglais (Philosophical Letters on the English). Most modern English editions are based on the one from 1734 and typically use the title Philosophical Letters, a direct translation of that version's title.

In some ways, the book can be compared with Democracy in America by Alexis de Tocqueville, in how it flatteringly explains a nation to itself from the perspective of an outsider, as Voltaire's depictions of aspects of English culture, society and government are often given favourable treatment in comparison to their French equivalents.

== Summary ==
Lettres anglaises consists of twenty-four letters:

- Letter I: On The Quakers
- Letter II: On The Quakers
- Letter III: On The Quakers
- Letter IV: On The Quakers
- Letter V: On The Church of England
- Letter VI: On The Presbyterians
- Letter VII: On The Socinians, or Arians, or Antitrinitarians
- Letter VIII: On The Parliament
- Letter IX: On The Government
- Letter X: On Trade
- Letter XI: On Inoculation
- Letter XII: On The Lord Bacon
- Letter XIII: On Mr. Locke
- Letter XIV: On Descartes and Sir Isaac Newton
- Letter XV: On Attraction
- Letter XVI: On Sir Isaac Newton's Optics
- Letter XVII: On Infinites in Geometry, and Sir Isaac Newton's Chronology
- Letter XVIII: On Tragedy
- Letter XIX: On Comedy
- Letter XX: On Such of The Nobility as Cultivate The Belles Lettres
- Letter XXI: On The Earl of Rochester and Mr. Waller
- Letter XXII: On Mr. Pope and Some Other Famous Poets
- Letter XXIII: On The Regard That Ought to Be Shown to Men of Letters
- Letter XXIV: On The Royal Society and Other Academies

=== Religion ===
Voltaire first addresses religion in Letters 1–7. He specifically talks about Quakers (1–4), Anglicans (5), Presbyterians (6) and Socinians (7).

In the Letters 1–4, Voltaire describes the Quakers, their customs, their beliefs, and their history. He appreciates the simplicity of their rituals. In particular, he praises their lack of baptism ("we are not of opinion that the sprinkling water on a child's head makes him a Christian"), the lack of communion ("'How! no communion?' said I. 'Only that spiritual one', replied he, 'of hearts'"), and the lack of priests ("'You have, then, no priests?', said I to him. 'No, no, friend', replies the Quaker, 'to our great happiness'"), but still expresses concern regarding the manipulative nature of organized religion.

Letter 5 is devoted to the Anglican religion, which Voltaire compares favourably to Catholicism ("With regard to the morals of the English clergy, they are more regular than those of France"), but he criticizes the ways in which it has stayed true to the Catholic rituals, in particular ("The English clergy have retained a great number of the Romish ceremonies, and especially that of receiving, with a most scrupulous attention, their tithes").

In Letter 6, Voltaire attacks the Presbyterians, whom he sees as intolerant ("[The Presbyterian] affects a serious gait, puts on a sour look, wears a vastly broad-brimmed hat and a long cloak over a very short coat, preaches through the nose, and gives the name of the whore of Babylon to all churches where the ministers are so fortunate as to enjoy an annual revenue of five or six thousand pounds, and where the people are weak enough to suffer this, and to give them the titles of my lord, your lordship, or your eminence") and overly strict ("No operas, plays, or concerts are allowed in London on Sundays, and even cards are so expressly forbidden that none but persons of quality, and those we call the genteel, play on that day; the rest of the nation go either to church, to the tavern, or to see their mistresses").

Finally, in the Letter 7, he talks about the "Socinians", whose belief system is somewhat related to Voltaire's own deist viewpoint. Voltaire argues that while this sect includes some of the day's most important thinkers (including Newton and Locke), this is not enough to persuade the common man that it is logical. According to Voltaire, men prefer to follow the teachings of "wretched authors" such as Martin Luther, John Calvin or Huldrych Zwingli.

=== Politics ===
In Letters 8 and 9, Voltaire discusses the English political system.

Letter 8 talks about the British parliament, which he compares to both Rome and France. In terms of Rome, Voltaire deprecates the fact that England has entered wars on account of religion (whereas Rome did not), but he praises England for serving liberty rather than tyranny (as in Rome). In terms of France, Voltaire responds to French criticism concerning the regicide of Charles I by highlighting the British judicial process as opposed to the outright murders of Holy Roman Emperor Henry VII or Henry III of France, or the multiple attempts on the life of Henry IV of France.

In Letter 9, Voltaire gives a brief history of the Magna Carta, talks about the equal dispensing of justice, and the levying of taxes.

=== Trade and commerce ===
In Letter 10, Voltaire praises the English trade system, its benefits, and what it brings to the English (from 1707, British) nation. According to Voltaire, trade greatly contributed to the liberty of the English people, and this liberty in turn contributed to the expansion of commerce. It is trade as well that gave England its naval riches and power. In addition, Voltaire takes the opportunity to satirize the German and French nobles who ignore this type of enterprise. For Voltaire, nobles are less important than the businessman who "contributes to the felicity of the world".

=== Medicine ===
In Letter 11, Voltaire argues in favour for the English practice of inoculation, which was widely mistrusted and condemned in continental Europe. This letter is probably in response to a 1723 small pox epidemic in Paris that killed 20,000 people.

=== Famous Britons ===
Letter 12 speaks of Francis Bacon, author of Novum Organum and father of experimental philosophy.

Letter 13 is about John Locke and his theories on the immortality of the soul.

Letter 14 compares British philosopher Isaac Newton to French philosopher René Descartes. Upon his death in 1727, Newton was compared to Descartes in a eulogy performed by French philosopher Fontenelle. While the British did not appreciate this comparison, Voltaire argues that Descartes, too, was a great philosopher and mathematician.

Letter 15 focuses on Newton's law of universal gravitation. Letter 16 talks about Newton's work with optics. Letter 17 discusses Newton's work with geometry and his theories on the chronology of history.

=== Art ===
In Letter 18, Voltaire talks about British tragedy, specifically in the hands of William Shakespeare. Voltaire presents his readers with the famous "To be, or not to be" soliloquy in Hamlet along with a translation into French rhyming verse. He also cites a passage from John Dryden and gives a translation.

In Letter 19, Voltaire addresses British comedy, citing William Wycherley, John Vanbrugh and William Congreve.

Letter 20 speaks briefly of the belles lettres of the nobility, including the Earl of Rochester and Edmund Waller.

Letter 22 references the poetry of Jonathan Swift and Alexander Pope.

In Letter 23, Voltaire argues that the British honour their Men of Letters far better than the French in terms of money and veneration.

The last letter, Letter 24, discusses the Royal Society of London, which he compares unfavourably to the Académie Française.

== Letter XXV ==
=== Philosophy ===
In the letter 25, which was not included with the original twenty-four, Voltaire criticizes certain ideas of Blaise Pascal by taking citations from his Pensées and giving his own opinion on the same subject. The most important difference between the two philosophers is in their conception of man. Pascal insists on the miserable aspect of man who must fill the emptiness of his life with amusements, while Voltaire accepts the optimistic Enlightenment view.
