= Shakespeare's editors =

Shakespeare's editors were essential in the development of the modern practice of producing printed books and the evolution of textual criticism.

The 17th-century folio collections of the plays of William Shakespeare did not have editors in the modern sense of the term. In the best understanding of contemporary consensus scholarship, the plays to be included in the First Folio (1623) were gathered together or "compiled" by John Heminges and Henry Condell, two long-time colleagues of Shakespeare in the King's Men. The play manuscripts may have been proofread and prepared for printing by Edward Knight, the "book-keeper" or prompter of the company. The task of proofreading and correcting the actual printed pages of the Folio was left to the compositors and printers in the print-shop, yielding the uneven and often defective text that is the First Folio.

Even less is known about the creation of the Second (1632), Third (1663–64), and Fourth Folios (1685) than about the First; see early texts of Shakespeare's works.

In the 18th century, however, interested individuals made the first concerted efforts to bring order to the tangle of textual difficulties that the Folios of the previous century presented. The list below gives the date of each edition of Shakespeare's plays, the editor, the format of the collection, and pertinent specific information.

- 1709–10, Nicholas Rowe; octavo, 7 volumes. Rowe was the first person to attempt a clean and fully comprehensible text of the plays; but he depended upon a copy of the Fourth Folio and made generally conjectural emendations. He also added full stage directions (he was a playwright himself) and full lists of Dramatis personae, and wrote the first biographical sketch of the poet.
- 1725, Alexander Pope; quarto, 6 volumes. Pope was the first to attempt a collation of the quarto texts of the plays, yet he produced what was basically a reprint of Rowe that added little of value.
- 1733, Lewis Theobald; octavo, 7 volumes. Theobald has been called "the first Shakespeare scholar"; he carried forward the task of collating the quartos, and began the study of Shakespeare's sources and the order of the plays' composition. (See Chronology of Shakespeare's plays.)
- 1744, Thomas Hanmer; quarto, 6 volumes. Hanmer relied on Theobald's text, and made guesswork corrections. His edition was reprinted in 1770.
- 1747, William Warburton; octavo, 8 volumes. Warburton built upon Pope's edition; indeed, Warburton placed Pope's name before his own on the title pages of his edition. In his preface, Warburton wrote that his friend Pope "was desirous I should give a new Edition of this Poet, as he thought it might contribute to put a stop to a prevailing folly of altering the Text of celebrated Authors without Talents or Judgment. And he was willing that his Edition should be melted down into mine, as it would, he said, afford him (so great is the modesty of an ingenuous temper) a fit opportunity of confessing his Mistakes." The phrase "without Talents or Judgment" refers to Theobold and Hanmer. However, Warburton did allow, rather begrudgingly, some corrections put forward by Theobold and Hanmer: "For the rest, all the Corrections which these two Editors have made on any reasonable Foundation, are here admitted into the Text; and carefully assigned to their respective Authors. A piece of Justice which the Oxford Editor never did; and which the Other was not always scrupulous in observing towards me."
- In 1748 Thomas Edwards published his Supplement to Warburton's Edition of Shakespeare, in later editions called The Canons of Criticism – a satirical but spot-on analysis of Warburton's editorial emendations, some of which are truly silly. Samuel Johnson had this to say: "Soon after Edwards's Canons of Criticism came out, Johnson was dining at Tonson the Bookseller's, with Hayman the Painter and some more company. Hayman related to Sir Joshua Reynolds, that the conversation having turned upon Edwards's book, the gentlemen praised it much, and Johnson allowed its merit. But when they went farther, and appeared to put that authour upon a level with Warburton, "Nay, (said Johnson,) he has given him some smart hits to be sure; but there is no proportion between the two men; they must not be named together. A fly, Sir, may sting a stately horse and make him wince; but one is but an insect, and the other is a horse still."
- 1765, Samuel Johnson, The Plays of William Shakespeare; octavo, 8 volumes. Johnson in turn relied upon Warburton; his edition is noteworthy mainly for its famous Preface, and for its notes, which are a partial variorum of those of earlier editors.
- 1768, Edward Capell; octavo, 10 volumes. Appalled by the undisciplined emendations of Hanmer and Warburton, Capell spent three decades collecting and collating the quartos. He was also the first to exploit the Stationers' Register and Francis Meres's Palladis Tamia, and to explore Shakespeare's use of Raphael Holinshed's Chronicles and Sir Thomas North's translation of Plutarch's Parallel Lives.
- 1773, George Steevens; octavo, 10 volumes. Steevens employed Johnson's text, but continued Capell's trend of adding new material. Steevens revised and re-issued his edition in 1778; in 1780 Edmond Malone added another 2 volumes that contained Shakespeare's non-dramatic poems and other material. Isaac Reed revised the Steevens edition again in 1785, and Steevens himself produced one final, 15-volume revision in 1793.
- 1778, Edmond Malone; octavo, 10 volumes. Malone, often considered the best of the century's editors of Shakespeare, wrote the first general consideration of English Renaissance theatre, utilizing resources like the records of the Master of the Revels and Edward Alleyn's papers at Dulwich College. He is also noted for his work on the problem of chronology.

The early 19th century saw the first Variorum editions of Shakespeare's works, editions that collated and synthesized the efforts of the editors of the previous century:

- 1803, the First Variorum edition, edited by Isaac Reed; 21 volumes.
- 1813, the Second Variorum, a reprint of the First; 21 volumes.
- 1821, the Third Variorum, edited by James Boswell (the younger); 21 volumes.

These massive editions laid the foundation for modern textual scholarship on Shakespeare's works, and by extension on works of literature in general. In the 19th century the text, drawn primarily from Malone and Steevens, was "monumentalized" in the Cambridge edition (1863–66) and its single-volume companion, the Globe edition (1864). It was followed by the New Cambridge edition in 1921, and all modern standard editions inherit primarily from this edition.

As for the personalities involved: some of these men were friends, like Steevens, Reed, and Malone; acquaintances called them the Shakespeare Gang. Others nourished spirits of competitiveness and resentment. Pope made Theobald the first hero of The Dunciad. Warburton belittled Rowe's "Account of the Life" of Shakespeare – but he reprinted it in his own edition, without change or improvement. Despite his friendship with Malone and Reed, Steevens was famous for his irascibility; in notes to his 1793 edition of Shakespeare, he concocted obscene interpretations of some passages and attributed those readings to people he didn't like.

The next major edition, the Cambridge Shakespeare (1863–66), moved away from the practice of a single editor following his own sometimes capricious instincts and judgments. The first volume of the Cambridge Shakespeare was edited by William George Clark and John Glover, and the subsequent eight volumes by Clark and William Aldis Wright. Clark and Wright also produced the single-volume Globe Shakespeare (1864) using their Cambridge texts; together, these became the standard for the remainder of the century.

The most radical edition in the twentieth century was the Oxford Shakespeare, prepared under the general editorship of Stanley Wells and Gary Taylor. It aims to present the texts as they were originally performed, which results in numerous controversial choices, including presenting multiple texts of King Lear, a text of Hamlet in which the scenes presumably cut by Shakespeare are relegated to an appendix, and an emphasis on the collaborative nature of several of the plays.
