= Richard Farmer =

18th-century English Shakespearean scholar and academic

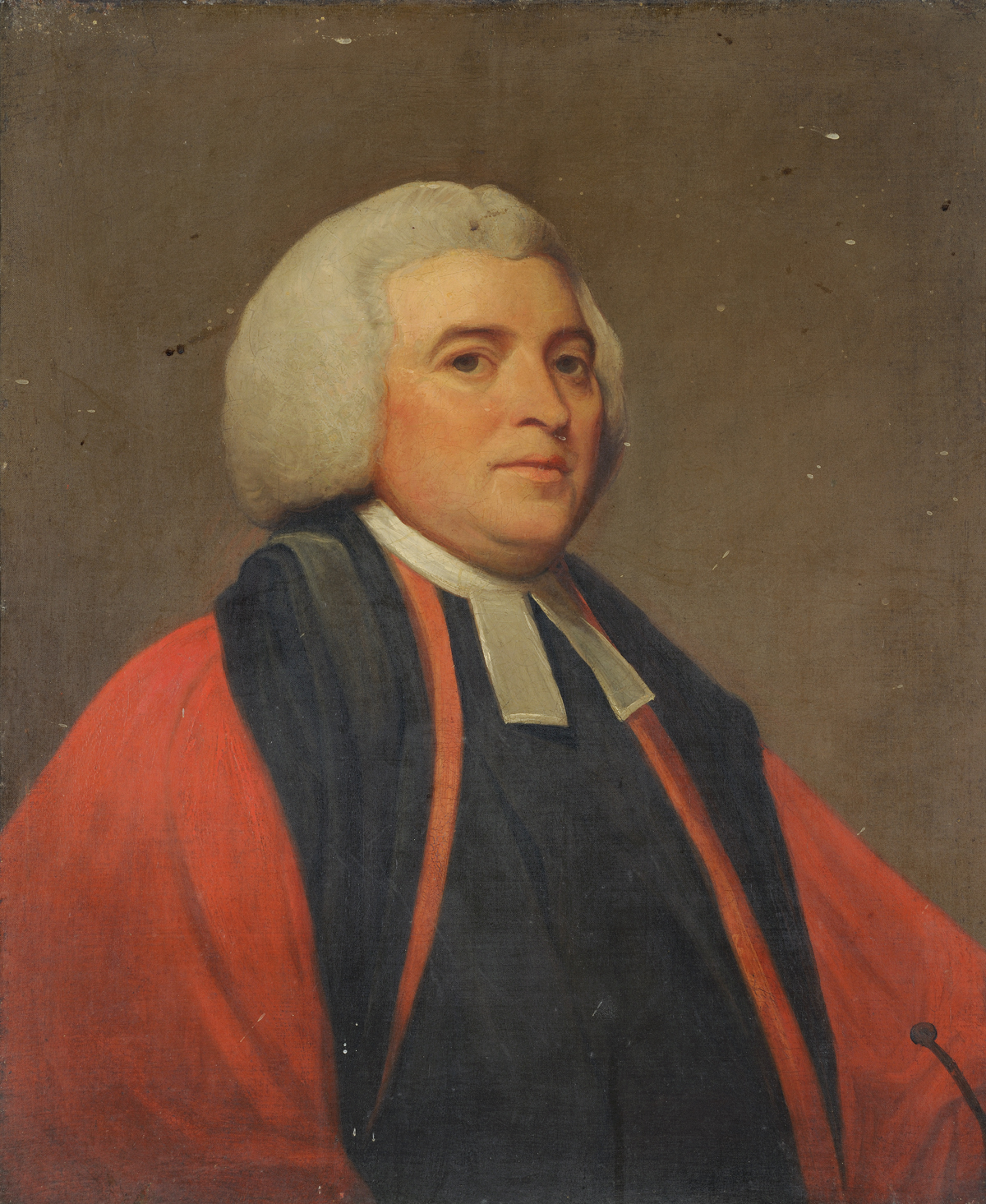
Richard Farmer, portrait by George Romney.

Richard Farmer FRS FSA (1735–1797) was a Shakespearean scholar and Master of Emmanuel College, Cambridge. He is known for his Essay on the Learning of Shakespeare (1767), in which he maintained that Shakespeare's knowledge of the classics was through translations, the errors of which he reproduced.

== Life ==
Farmer was born at Leicester on 28 August 1735, the second son of Richard Farmer, a maltster, by his wife Hannah, daughter of John Knibb. He was educated under the Rev. Gerrard Andrewes, in the free grammar school at Leicester, and about 1753 entered as a pensioner at Emmanuel College, Cambridge, where he graduated B.A. in 1757, and was a 'senior optime.' He successfully contested with Wanley Sawbridge for the silver cup given at Emmanuel College to the best graduate of that year. In 1760 he commenced M.A., and succeeded the Rev. Mr. Bickham as classical tutor of his college. For many years, while tutor, he served the curacy of Swavesey.

On 19 May 1763 Farmer was elected a Fellow of the Society of Antiquaries. In 1765 he was junior proctor of the university. He had already formed an extensive library and had acquired a reputation as a scholar and antiquary. When Samuel Johnson visited Cambridge in 1765 he had a 'joyous meeting' with Farmer at Emmanuel. The two scholars afterwards maintained a correspondence on literary topics; on one occasion Johnson requested Farmer to help George Steevens on translations which Shakespeare might have seen, and on another he himself asked for information from the university registers on Cambridge graduates in the Lives of the Poets.

In 1767 he took the degree of B.D., and on 8 July 1769 Richard Terrick, bishop of London, appointed him one of the preachers at the Chapel Royal, Whitehall. When in London he usually resided at the house of Dr. Anthony Askew, the eminent physician, in Queen Square, Bloomsbury. In 1775, on the death of Dr. Richardson, he was chosen master of Emmanuel College, Henry Hubbard, the senior fellow, having declined the post. He now took the degree of D.D., and was very soon succeeded in the tutorship by Dr. William Bennet, later bishop of Cloyne.

He served the office of vice-chancellor of the university in 1775–6, and again in 1787–8. During his first term of office the university voted an address to the king, in support of the American policy of the government. One member of the Caput refused to give up the key of the place containing the university seal, and Farmer is said to have forced open the door with a sledge-hammer—an exploit which some biographers allege to have been the cause of all his subsequent preferments. On the death of Dr. Barnardiston, master of Corpus Christi College, he was (27 June 1778) unanimously elected principal librarian of the university. In April 1780 he was collated by Bishop Richard Hurd to the prebend of Alrewas in Lichfield Cathedral. In March 1782 he was installed a canon in the ninth prebend of the church of Canterbury. After enjoying this prebend for several years he resigned it on being preferred by William Pitt to a canonry residentiary and the prebend of Consumpta-per-Mare at St Paul's Cathedral, on 19 March 1788.

The last years of his life were divided between Emmanuel College and the residentiary house in Amen Corner. He was a member of clubs: the Eumélean Club at Blenheim Tavern, Bond Street, of which Dr. John Ash was president, the Unincreasable Club, Queen's Head, Holborn, of which Isaac Reed was president, and the Literary Club, founded by Dr. Johnson and Sir Joshua Reynolds. Farmer twice declined a bishopric that was offered to him by Pitt as a reward for his Tory principles. In 1796 he was admitted ad eundem at Oxford.

He died, after a long and painful illness, at the lodge of Emmanuel College, on 8 September 1797, and was buried in the chapel. A monument was erected to his memory in the cloisters, inscribed with a Latin epitaph composed by Samuel Parr. A portrait of him was engraved by John Jones from a painting by George Romney.

== Works ==
His friend Isaac Reed remarked on his easy way at Emmanuel as a successful Master; but as a scholar he was not productive. When a young man he wrote some Directions for Studying the English History, which were printed in the European Magazine for 1791 and in William Seward's Biographiana.

On 15 May 1766 Farmer issued from the university press proposals for printing the history of Leicester, written by Thomas Staveley; but eventually abandoned this plan. Staveley's collections, together with those of the Rev. Samuel Carte, several original manuscripts, and some engraved plates, he presented to John Nichols, who made use of them in his work Leicestershire.

In 1767 he brought out the first edition of his only published work, an Essay on the Learning of Shakspeare (Cambridge), addressed to his friend and schoolfellow, Joseph Cradock of Gumley. A second expanded edition came out in the same year. A third edition was printed at London in 1789. A fourth edition appeared at London in 1821. The essay is also in George Steevens's edition of Shakespeare 1793, in Reed's edition 1803, in Harris's edition 1812, and in Boswell's 'Variorum,’ 1821. Farmer proposed that Shakespeare's knowledge of classical history was obtained at second hand through translations.

His library, rich in scarce tracts and old English literature, was sold in London in 1798. The catalogue extends to 379 pages, and the separate books number 8,155; it sold for £2,210. A scurrilous pamphlet, entitled 'The Battle between Dr. Farmer and Peter Musgrave, the Cambridge Taylor, in Hudibrastic verse,’ appeared at London in 1792.

== Sources ==
Academic offices
Preceded by William Richardson	Master of Emmanuel College, Cambridge; 1775–1797	Succeeded by Robert Towerson Cory
