= 1725 in literature =

This article contains information about the literary events and publications of 1725.

== Events ==
- June 12 – Émilie de Breteuil marries Marquis Florent-Claude du Chastellet.
- December – The library of Charles Killigrew, who was the Master of the Revels for 48 years, is sold a few months after his death.
- In China, work on the 5,020-volume encyclopedia, the Complete Classics Collection of Ancient China, begun by Chen Menglei in 1700, is completed.

== New books ==
=== Prose ===
- Joseph Addison – Miscellanies
- The Book of the Sacred Magic of Abramelin the Mage (first printed edition)
- Mary Davys – The Works of Mrs. Davys
- Daniel Defoe – The Complete English Tradesman
- George Bubb Dodington – An Epistle to Sir Robert Walpole
- John Dyer – A New Miscellany
- Laurence Echard – The History of the Revolution, and the Establishment of England, in the Year, 1688
- Benjamin Franklin – A Dissertation on Liberty and Necessity, Pleasure and Pain
- Johann Joseph Fux – Gradus ad Parnassum (Steps to Mount Parnassus, in Latin)
- Zachary Grey – A Defence of Our Antient and Modern Historians (against John Oldmixon)
- Eliza Haywood
  - Bath-Intrigues
  - Fantomina
  - Memoirs of a Certain Island Adjacent to the Kingdom of Utopia
  - Secret Histories, Novels and Poems
- Francis Hutcheson – An Inquiry into the Original of Our Ideas of Beauty and Virtue (on aesthetics)
- John Oldmixon – A Review of Dr. Zachary Grey's Defence
- Richardson Pack – A New Collection of Miscellanies
- Christopher Pitt – Vida's Art of Poetry (translation of Marco Girolamo Vida)
- Richard Savage – The Authors of the Town
- William Shakespeare – The Works of Shakespear (edited by Pope)
- Jonathan Swift – Fraud Detected; or, The Hibernian Patriot
- Giambattista Vico – New Science
- Isaac Watts – Logick
- George Whitehead – The Christian Progress of George Whitehead
- Edward Young – The Universal Passion: Satire
- Benito Jerónimo Feijoo – Aprobación apologetica del scepticismo médico del doctor Martín Martínez
- Diego de Torres Villarroel – Correo del otro mundo al gran Piscator de Salamanca

=== Drama ===
- Colley Cibber – Caesar in Aegypt
- Augustin Nadal – Mariamne
- Gabriel Odingsells –
  - The Bath Unmasked
  - The Capricious Lovers
- Thomas Sheridan, translator -The Philoctetes of Sophocles

=== Poetry ===
- Henry Baker – Original Poems
- Henry Carey – Namby Pamby (satire on Ambrose Philips)
- Thomas Cooke – The Battle of the Poets (satire on Alexander Pope)
- John Glanvill – Poems
- Alexander Pope – The Odyssey of Homer vols. i–iii
- Allan Ramsay – The Gentle Shepherd

== Births ==
- February 5 – Anna Maria Rückerschöld, Swedish author (died 1805)
- February 12 – William Mason, English poet and gardener (died 1797)
- March 22 – Ignacy Nagurczewski, Polish writer and translator (died 1811)
- April 2 – Giacomo Casanova, Italian autobiographer and adventurer (died 1798)
- July 24 – John Newton, English hymnist, naval officer and cleric (died 1807)
- December 5 – Susanna Duncombe, English poet and artist (died 1812)

== Deaths ==
- January 6 – Chikamatsu Monzaemon (近松 門左衛門), Japanese dramatist (born 1653)
- January 26 – Sulkhan-Saba Orbeliani, Georgian prince and writer (born 1658)
- February 8 – John Bellers, English writer and Quaker (born 1654)
- March 2 – Johan Peringskiöld, Swedish antiquary and translator (born 1689)
- April 25 – Paul de Rapin, French historian (born 1661)
- June 29 – Arai Hakuseki, Japanese scholar-bureaucrat and writer (born 1657)
- September 5 – Christian Wernicke, German epigrammist (born 1661)
- December 7 – Florent Carton Dancourt, French dramatist and actor (born 1661)
- Unknown date – Richard Fiddes, English historian and cleric (born 1671)
