= Hérode et Mariamne =

1724 tragedy by Voltaire

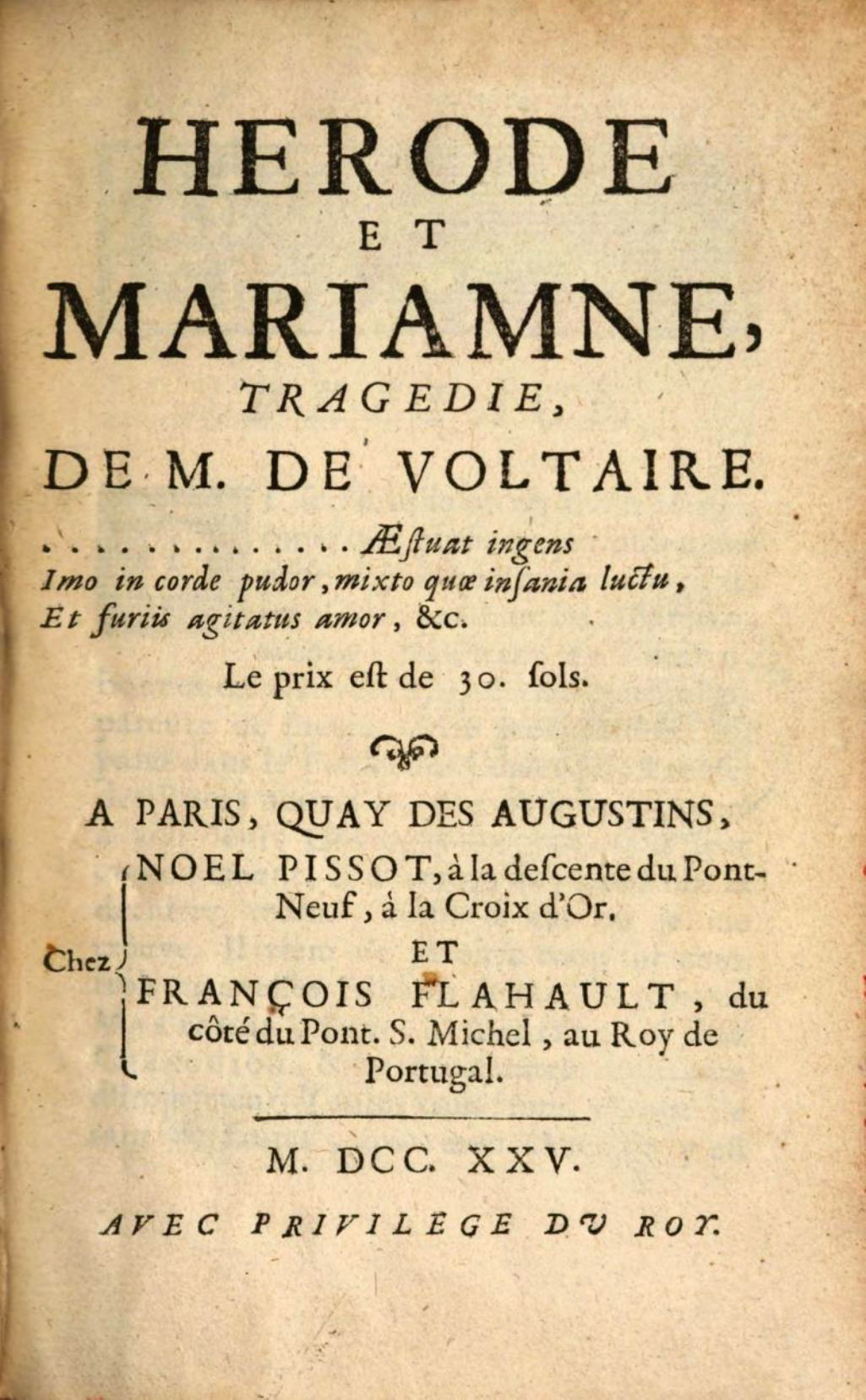

Hérode et Mariamne or Mariamne is a 1724 tragedy by Voltaire. Adapted from the writings of the historian Josephus, it is set in ancient Jerusalem, and portrays the tragic death of Mariamne at the hands of her jealous husband, Herod the Great, king of Judea, who suspects her of an intrigue with Varus, the Roman governor of Syria.

The play premiered with Adrienne Lecouvreur as Mariamne, Baron as Hérode and Duclos as Salome, but it was withdrawn after just one performance when the audience gave it a critical reception. This failure encouraged Augustin Nadal to produce his Mariamne in February 1725, but that was also hostilely received, with calls for the return of Voltaire's version of the story. Nadal accused Voltaire of ensuring Nadal's play's failure by filling the audience with his supporters, and this led to a bitter war of words between them.

Within months of Nadal's play, Voltaire managed to revise his play (responding to criticisms in the characterisation, he made Herod a more self-doubting and introspective rather than monolithic figure, for example, and moved Mariamne's suicide off-stage) and his cast (changing Hérode from Baron to Dufresne). It re-premiered at the Comédie-Française as Hérode et Mariamne on 25 April 1725. In this form, it proved a success, with two-thirds of all boxes at the theatre pre-booked and crowds besieging the theatre, and thus brought Voltaire back into France's upper cultural echelons. It even proved the subject of the 1725 parody le Mauvais ménage de Voltaire, by Dominique and Legrand.

== Dispute with Rousseau ==
Rousseau's reaction to the play was one of the causes of his long dispute with Voltaire. Having seen the play, Rousseau wrote to a friend with his reaction to it, and the letter fell into Voltaire's hands. Alluding to Voltaire's re-use of material from his earlier failed tragedy Artémire, Rousseau described the play as "the second delivery of an abortion, taken again into the womb of its mother to receive fresh nourishment... I can discern nothing from the head to the tail but a number of disjointed and monstrous parts instead of a complete whole. In short it is impossible to reconcile this farrago with common sense."

== Cast ==
- Varus, Roman praetor and governor of Syria
- Hérode, king of Palestine
- Mariamne, wife of Hérode
- Salome, sister of Hérode
- Albin, confidant of Varus
- Mazael and Idamas, ministers of Hérode
- Nabal, an old officer of the Hasmonean kings (possibly a satirical side-swipe at Nadal)
- Elize, confidante of Mariamne
- Hérode's followers
- Varus's followers
