= Octavius Gilchrist =

Octavius Graham Gilchrist (/ˈɡɪlkrɪst/; 1779–1823) was an English man of letters and antiquary.

== Life ==
He was born at Twickenham; his father, Stirling Gilchrist, lieutenant and surgeon in the 3rd Dragoon Guards, had retired there. Octavius was one of a family of sixteen. He was educated at Magdalen College, Oxford, but left the university early without a degree, in order to assist a relative, Alderman Joseph Robinson, grocer, in business at Stamford, Lincolnshire. In 1803 he was elected a Fellow of the Society of Antiquaries of London; and in the following year he married Elizabeth, daughter of James Nowlan, a merchant, of the Hermitage, Wapping.

On 30 June 1823 Gilchrist died at his house in the High Street, Stamford; he had long been tubercular. His library, which contained Elizabethan and early printed books, was sold at auction by R. H. Evans 5–11 January 1824. A priced copy of the catalogue is at Cambridge University Library (shelfmark Munby.c.127(1).

== Works ==
He printed in 1805, for private circulation, a short volume of Rhymes; and in 1807 he published an edition of the Poems of Richard Corbet. To his friend William Gifford he addressed in 1808 An Examination of the Charges maintained by Messrs. Malone, Chalmers, and others of Ben Jonson's enmity towards Shakespeare; and in 1811 A Letter on the late edition of Ford's Plays directed at Henry William Weber. Early in 1814 Gilchrist printed, but never circulated, proposals for publishing a large play collection; the scheme was abandoned after the appearance of Charles Wentworth Dilke's Old English Plays. Notes of Gilchrist are incorporated in the third edition, by John Payne Collier) of Robert Dodsley's Old Plays, 1825–7. Gifford, in his editions of Ben Jonson and John Ford, acknowledged the help that he received from Gilchrist's investigations. Gilchrist also probably supplied much of the material for John Drakard's History of Stamford (1822).

== Controversy ==
The Quarterly Review for June 1812 contains a severe article by Gilchrist on Stephen Jones's edition of David Erskine Baker's Biographia Dramatica. Jones published a reply entitled Hypercriticism Exposed, 1812. The Quarterly Review for October 1820 had some uncomplimentary remarks on William Lisle Bowles, in a review of Spence's Anecdotes. Bowles replied in The Pamphleteer, vol. xvii., ascribing the Quarterly article to Gilchrist, who (while disclaiming the authorship) published a Letter to the Rev. William Lisle Bowles, Stamford, 1820. An acrimonious controversy ensued.
