= Thomas Whincop =

Thomas Whincop (2 June 1697 – 1730) was an English compiler of theatrical history.

== Life ==
He is identified as the son of Thomas Whincop, D.D., rector of St Mary Abchurch. On that basis he was educated at Merchant Taylor's School and Corpus Christi College, Cambridge. He lost considerable sums in the South Sea bubble during 1721, and died at Totteridge, where he was buried on 1 September 1730.

== Works ==
Posthumous was "Scanderbeg; or Love and Liberty: a Tragedy. To which is added a List of all the Dramatic Authors, with some Account of their Lives; and of all the Dramatic Pieces published in the English language to the year 1747" (London, 1747). The work was edited by Martha Whincop, the widow, who dedicated the volume to the Earl of Middlesex. The hand of compiler John Mottley was likely involved in compilation and revision. The dramatic authors are divided into two alphabetical categories, those who flourished before and those who flourished after 1660, and there are small medallion portraits engraved by N. Parr. At the end is an index of the titles of plays. The book was based for the most part on the 'English Dramatic Poets' (1691) of Gerard Langbaine the younger. Whincop's works were later merged in those of Benjamin Victor, David Erskine Baker, and Isaac Reed.

== Notes ==
Attribution

This article incorporates text from a publication now in the public domain: "Whincop, Thomas". Dictionary of National Biography. London: Smith, Elder & Co. 1885–1900.
