= Edward Capell =

18th-century English Shakespearian critic

Coordinates: 52.31049°N 0.78720°E

Edward Capell (11 June 1713 – 24 February 1781) was an English Shakespearian critic.

== Biography ==
He was born at Troston Hall (TL901717) in Suffolk.

Through the influence of the Duke of Grafton he was appointed to the office of deputy-inspector of plays in 1737, with a salary of £200 per annum, and in 1745 he was made a Groom of the Privy Chamber through the same influence. In 1760 appeared his Prolusions, or, Select Pieces of Ancient Poetry, a collection which included Edward III, placed by Capell among the doubtful plays of Shakespeare.

Shocked at the inaccuracies which had crept into Sir Thomas Hanmer's edition of Shakespeare, he projected an entirely new edition, to be carefully collated with the original copies. After spending three years in collecting, and comparing scarce folio and quarto editions, he published his own edition in 10 vols 8vo (1768), with an introduction written in a style of extraordinary quaintness, which was afterwards appended to Johnson's and Steevens's editions.

Capell published the first part of his commentary, which included notes on nine plays with a glossary, in 1774. This he afterwards recalled, and the publication of the complete work, Notes and Various Readings of Shakespeare (1779–1783), the third volume of which bears the title of The School of Shakespeare, was completed, under the superintendence of John Collins, in 1783, two years after the author's death. It contains the results of his unremitting labour for thirty years, and throws considerable light on the history of the times of Shakespeare, as well as on the sources from which he derived his plots.

Collins asserted that Steevens had stolen Capell's notes for his own edition, the story being that the printers had been bribed to show Steevens the sheets of Capell's edition while it was passing through the press. Besides the works already specified, he published an edition of Antony and Cleopatra, adapted for the stage with the help of David Garrick in 1758. His edition of Shakespeare passed through many editions (1768, 1771, 1793, 1799, 1803, 1813). Capell died in the Temple on 24 February 1781.

== See also ==
- 1760 in literature
- Shakespeare's editors
- English Renaissance Theatre
