= Queen Elizabeth's Grammar School, Ashbourne =

Queen Elizabeth's Grammar School
- Queen Elizabeth's Grammar School Logo: The Coat of Arms and Motto of The Cokayne Family

Location
- The Green Road; Ashbourne, Derbyshire, DE6 1EP; England; 53°01′19″N 1°43′46″W

Information
- Type: Academy
- Motto: En bon espoyr
- Established: 1585; 441 years ago
- Department for Education URN: 136972 Tables
- Ofsted: Reports
- Chair of Governors: Helen Baker
- Head of Academy: Scott "Gazza" Garrity
- Gender: Coeducational
- Age: 11 to 18
- Enrolment: ~1,400 pupils
- Houses: Cokayne Boothby, Hull, Spalden
- Publication: QEGS Press
- Website: http://www.queenelizabeths.derbyshire.sch.uk/

Queen Elizabeth's School (QEGS) is a coeducational comprehensive academy school for 11- to 18-year-olds in the town of Ashbourne, Derbyshire, England. In the academic year 2009–10, there were 1,396 pupils on roll.

Both the main school and 6th form have in the past appeared within the top 25 in league tables, and in October 2008, Ofsted marked the school as "good" or "outstanding" in all sections. However in 2013 Ofsted marked the school as 'requires improvement' in 3 of the 4 categories. In 2009 the school celebrated 100 years at the Green Road site.

== History ==
The group who founded the school in 1585, included Sir Thomas Cokayne (1520-1592), (High Sheriff of Derbyshire, Lordship of the Town of Ashbourne) and Thomas Carter of the Middle Temple, London.

Sir Thomas Cokayne, the principal founding benefactor, granted £4 a year out of his lands towards the maintenance of the school. Having been instrumental in petitioning Queen Elizabeth to found the school in the first place, Sir Thomas Cokayne and his heirs continued down the generations to take a proprietary interest in the school as governors. The school still bears the Cokayne shield of arms of three cocks for its own badge. The original building still exists today.

The school moved to its current site on the Green Road in 1909.

Prior to 1973 the school was a grammar school, with an "11 plus" entry exam. In 1973 QEGS merged with the Ashbourne County Secondary School on Old Derby Road. The school kept both sites, and continued to use the historical name "Queen Elizabeth's Grammar School" although it operated as a comprehensive secondary school, not a grammar school, and had no entry exam and was the sole state secondary school in the town.

QEGS was awarded technology specialist status in 2005, and a new technology block was built with the funding received. On 1 August 2011 it converted to Academy Status and became an Independent State School but still serves the same catchment area and has the same admissions procedures.

== Current buildings ==
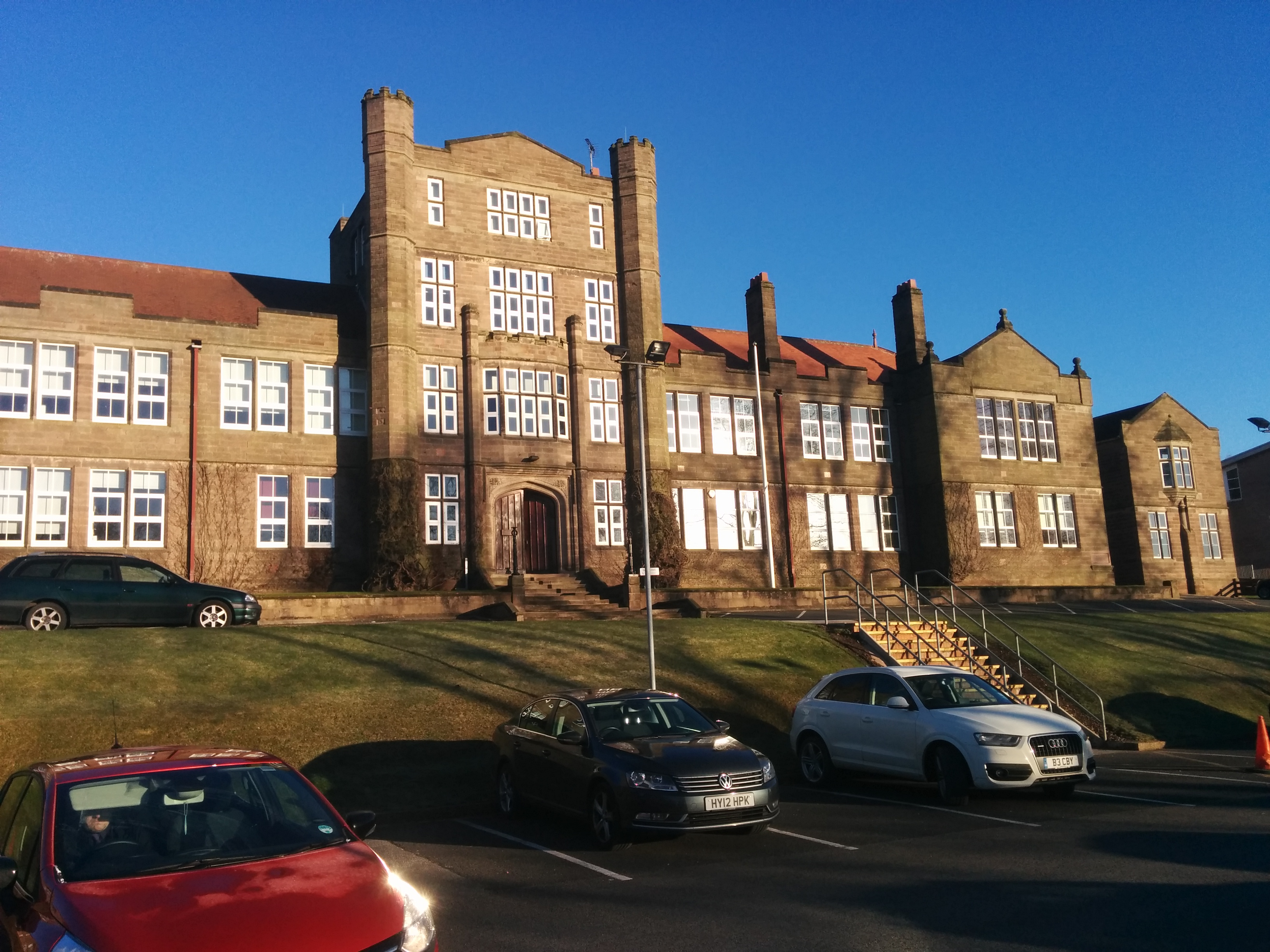
The school

- 'Old building': is the oldest part of the school, and is used for teaching maths and ICT. It also holds some smaller classrooms for SEN teaching.
- 'Science corridor': runs adjacent to the old building. Chemistry and physics are taught here. It is connected to the main building by a corridor with the library off it. The drama studio and gym are also connected to the science corridor.
- 'West wing': holds the main SEN classroom and a sixth form chemistry lab.
- 'East wing': contains a computer room and several offices.
- 'Teaching block' or 'New building': the largest building of the school. Subjects taught here include modern foreign languages, geography, history, biology, chemistry, physics, English, religious studies and art.
- 'Halls block': contains the canteen, main hall, sports hall and the music department.
- 'Old technology block': several technology workshops as well as food technology areas.
- 'New technology block': built in 2005, this contains up-to-date technology classrooms and workshop.

=== Sixth form centre ===
There are two buildings at the sixth form centre, where sixth form studies are taught, such as psychology, sociology and economics. An extension to the sixth form centre has now been added which is now open to staff and pupils, including a new information technology suite.

== Notable former pupils ==
=== Former grammar school ===
- Thomas Blore (1754–1818), topographer
- Gordon Bourne (1921–29) Obstetrician and author
- William Charles Langdon Brown CBE (1931–), Banker
- Captain Sir Robert Beaufin Irving OBE (1877–1954)
- Charlotte Methuen FRHistS (1964-), Church historian and Anglican priest
- Raymond Spencer Millard, (1920–97), Civil Engineer
- William Kenneth Ward, (1918–95), Under-Secretary, Department of Trade
- Lavinia Warner, created the 1980s BBC drama series Tenko

=== Comprehensive ===
- Neil Cooper, (1973–), drummer for Therapy?, teaches drumming at QEGS.
- Andrew Lewer MBE (1971-) Conservative Party politician

== See also ==
- List of English and Welsh endowed schools (19th century)
