= Évrard Titon du Tillet =

French historian (1677–1762)

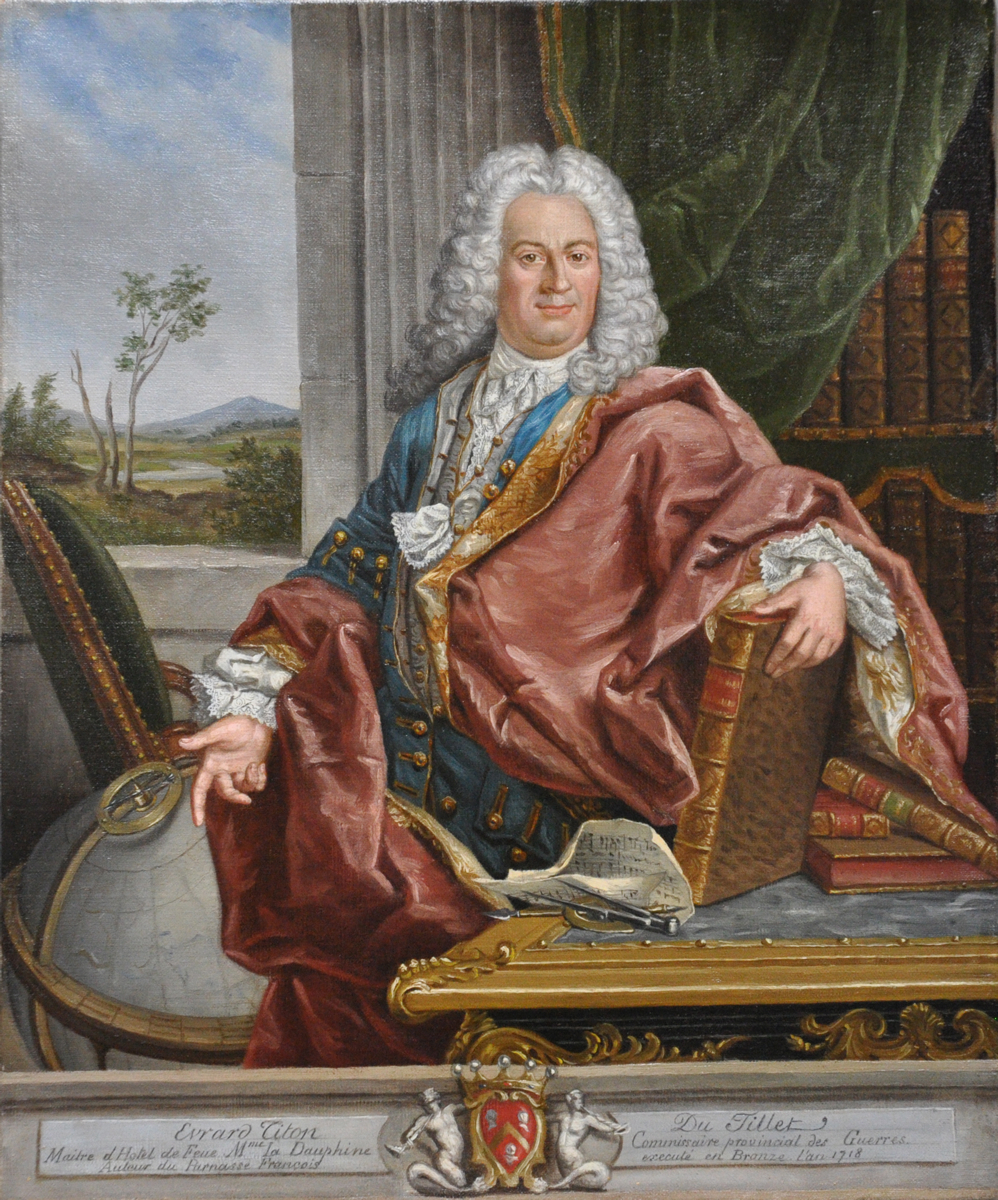
Titon du Tillet by Nicolas de Largillière

Évrard Titon du Tillet (French pronunciation: [evʁaʁ titɔ̃ dy tijɛ]; January 1677 – 26 December 1762) is best known for his important biographical chronicle, Le Parnasse françois, composed of brief anecdotal lives of famous French poets and musicians of his time, under the reign of Louis XIV and the Régence.

== Biography ==
Of Scottish origin, Évrard Titon du Tillet was the son of Maximilien Titon de Villegenon, seigneur d'Ognon, a secretary of the King and general manager of the armories under Louis XIV. He studied law before his father obliged him to embrace a military career. He was already a "captain of dragoons" at the age of twenty, when the long-awaited peace prevented him from advancing his career. He then purchased the sinecure of maître d'hôtel to the thirteen-year-old duchess of Burgundy, the future mother of Louis XV. Alas, in 1712, the Dauphine died of measles, and Titon du Tillet was unemployed for the second time. He was, however, soon named a provincial commissioner of war.

Titon du Tillet had the privilege of receiving the celebrities of his time, and from 1708 he was at work on an imposing project: to create a garden surrounding a monument, "the French Parnassus" (Le Parnasse françois), celebrating the glory of French poets and musicians under the reign of Louis XIV. He worked with the sculptor Louis Garnier, a pupil of François Girardon, to produce a model of the monument. A maquette in bronze for the project was completed in 1718. He also ordered a drawing by the painter Nicolas de Poilly, which was presented to Louis XV in 1723. The monument was to represent Mount Parnassus, ornamented with laurels and myrtle, with Louis XIV in the figure of Apollo at the summit, playing the lyre. On a slightly lower level the three Graces were represented with the features of Mmes des Houlières, de La Suze and de Scudéry. Lower down, surrounding the mountain, Pierre Corneille occupied the principal place, surrounded by Molière, Racine, Racan and Lully carrying medallions of Quinault, Segrais, La Fontaine, Boileau and Chapelle, the nine male Muses of the grand siècle. Unluckily, Titon du Tillet could not stop there: scattered among the bronze trees were to be seen further medallions of distinctly secondary figures, now slightly passé as musical taste had shifted towards the galante, choices that elicited from Voltaire the epigram

Dépêchez-vous, monsieur Titon,
Enrichissez votre Hélicon ;
Placez-y sur un piédestal
Saint-Didier, Danchet et Nadal ;
Qu'on voie armés d'un même archet
Saint-Didier, Nadal et Danchet,
Et couverts du même laurier
Danchet, Nadal et Saint-Didier.

The expected expenditure, estimated at nearly two million livres, forced him to terminate a project that had something to it of the character of a folly.

Titon du Tillet then decided to carry the project out to some extent in a virtual form: he published in 1727, "a Description of the Parnasse François" followed by "an alphabetical List of the Poets and Musicians gathered on this monument". In 1732, he published a second edition and increased the notes on the lives of the poets and musicians. Two further supplements were published in 1743 and 1755. This collection constitutes an invaluable source of biographical information for the mysterious Monsieur de Sainte-Colombe, Marin Marais, Louis Couperin, Michel Richard Delalande, Nicolas Bernier and other celebrated poets and musicians.

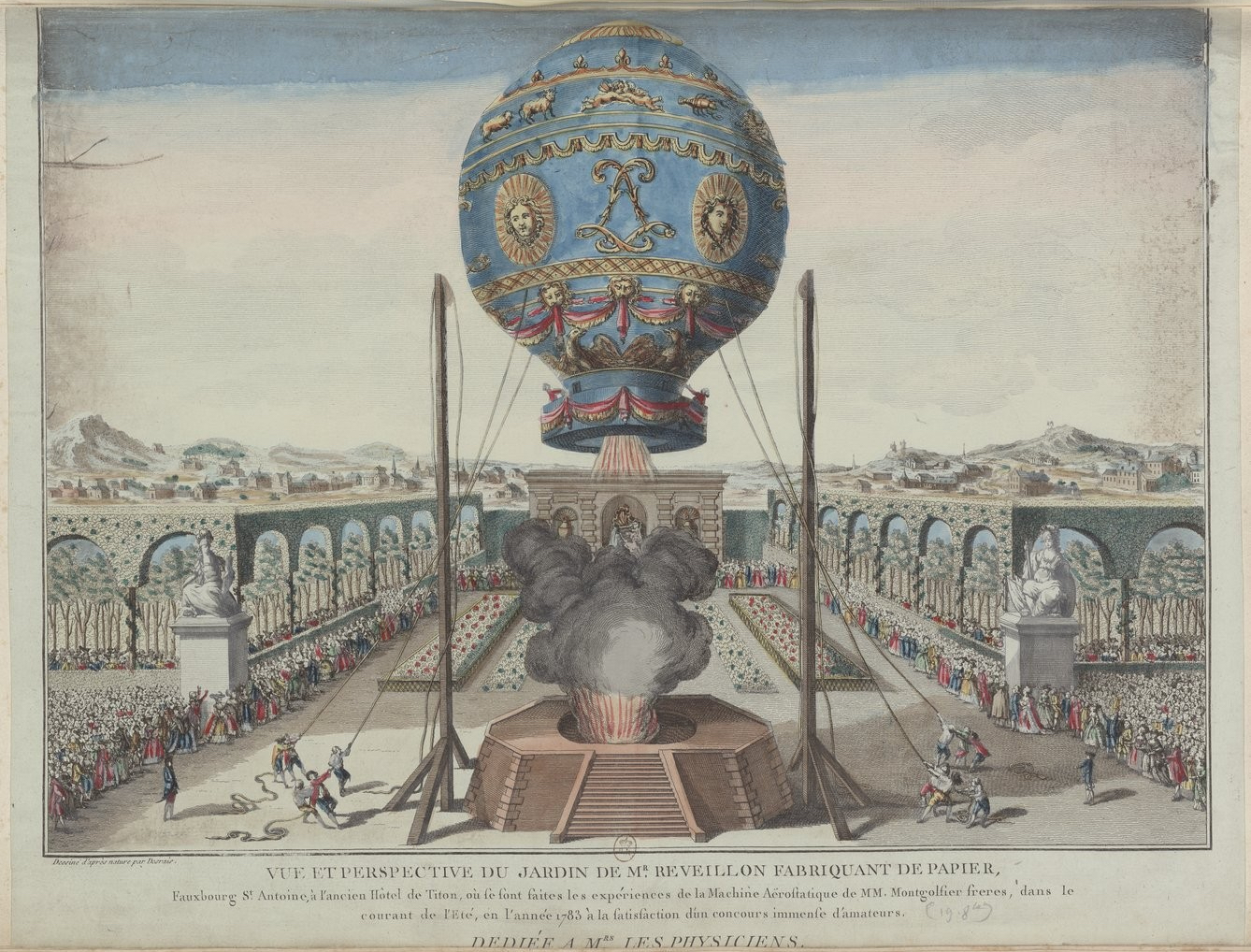
Ascent of the Montgolfière from the garden of the Folie Titon, Montreuil: contemporary engraving

A confirmed bachelor, Titon du Tillet was a cordial man always surrounded by many friends (some say that he was obstinate); his interesting conversation provided numerous anecdotes. In spring 1749, he withdrew to Montreuil, then on the outskirts of Paris, to a beautiful little hôtel, the Folie Titon, which, after his purchase in 1751 of the adjoining plot from the vicomte d’Argentière, captain of the guards, he was able to surround by a large park, with Paris laid out below his garden doors. The diarist Edmond Jean François Barbier, himself a lawyer attached to the Parlement of Paris, noted disapprovingly that Titon du Tillet lived in public debauchery with girls at the dinner table in a manner not "appropriate to a magistrate".

A passionate lover of arts and letters, Titon du Tillet supported ballets and plays. He constructed a theatre in his house where a number of performances were put on, introducing in 1760 Demoiselle Leclair, who went on to a dance career at the Comédie-Italienne, and in 1762 Marmontel's play Annette et Lubin, which attracted a considerable crowd.

Titon du Tillet died of a cold the day after Christmas, 1762, in Paris, aged 85.

== Work ==
- Évrard Titon du Tillet. Le Parnasse françois, 1732, etc.
