= John Drakard =

English newspaper publisher

John Drakard (1775?–1854) was an English newspaper proprietor, publisher, and political radical, imprisoned for his journalism.

== Life ==
He went into business at Stamford, Lincolnshire as a printer and book-seller at the beginning of the 19th century. On 15 September 1809 he started a weekly paper, the Stamford News. The first editor was the topographer Thomas Blore, but he and Drakard soon fell out.

On 13 March 1811 Drakard was tried at Lincoln before Baron George Wood and a special jury on an ex officio information for libel, and was sentenced to eighteen months' imprisonment in Lincoln Castle, and fined £200. The subject matter of the libel was an article published in Drakard's paper for 24 August 1810, entitled "One Thousand Lashes", which dealt with the question of corporal punishment in the British Army. Drakard was defended by Henry Brougham, but was convicted, even though the Hunts, proprietors of The Examiner, had been previously acquitted on the charge of libel for publishing most of the same article.

Drakard was a defendant in other libel suits. He was horsewhipped by Robert Brudenell, 6th Earl of Cardigan for some remarks in the Stamford News. Cardigan tracked him to Northampton, and gave him a public whipping on the racecourse.

Drakard was also the proprietor of the Stamford Champion, a weekly newspaper which first appeared on 5 January 1830, under the name of the Champion of the East. The poet John Clare wrote anonymous political satire in it.

In 1834 the publication of both his newspapers ceased, and Drakard retired to Ripley, North Yorkshire, where he lived on a meagre income. He died at Ripon on 25 January 1854, aged 79.

== Works ==
The authorship of the two following works (both of which were published by him) has been attributed to Drakard, but it has also been doubted whether he had any part in their writing:

- Drakard's Edition of the Public and Private Life of Colonel Wardle. … Introduced by an original Essay on Reform, &c., Stamford [1810?]. On Gwyllym Lloyd Wardle.
- The History of Stamford, in the County of Lincoln, comprising its ancient, progressive, and modern state; with an Account of St. Martin's, Stamford Baron, and Great and Little Wothorpe, Northamptonshire, Stamford, 1822. Octavius Graham Gilchrist is thought to have supplied much of the content.
