= Artémire (tragedy) =

1720 tragedy in five acts by Voltaire

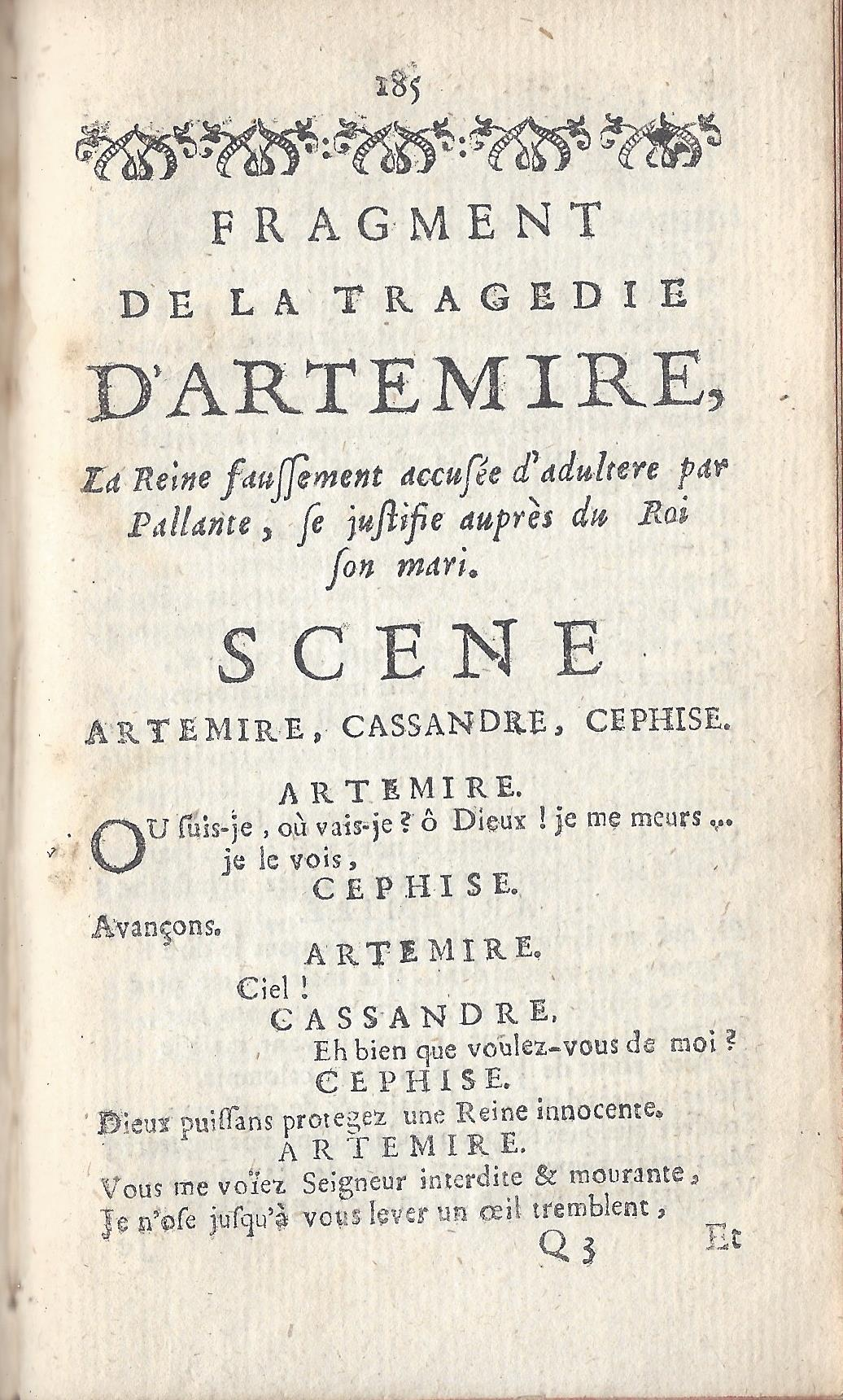
First publication of two fragments of Artémire, Amsterdam 1724

Artémire was Voltaire's second tragedy in five acts. When it failed at its premiere on February 15, 1720 at the Comédie-Française, Voltaire withdrew it and cancelled the printing.

== Action ==
The action is set in Larissa in Thessaly after the death of Alexander the Great. Artémire, the virtuous wife of the usurper Cassandre, who actually loves the rightful aspirant of Philotas, is persecuted by her husband, and is ultimately saved by his unexpected death.

The publishers of the Kehl edition of Voltaire's complete works could not find a synopsis for the play, so their arrangement of the surviving fragments was based on a parody of Artémire listed in the Comédie-Italienne in an act by Dominique, only two days after the premiere.

== Contemporary reception ==
The play was originally conceived as a vehicle for the famous actress Adrienne Lecouvreur, who was to become Voltaire's lover. It was first performed at Sully by a group of aristocratic amateurs, guests of the Duke.

After being withdrawn from the public theatre, Artémire had seven further performances by request of the Regent's mother Elizabeth Charlotte, Madame Palatine. The literary review L'Europe savante reported the play had had few performances, and that it contained the same weaknesses and favourable points as Voltaire's first tragedy Oedipe though it failed where Oedipe had succeeded. Voltaire reused some of the material from Artémire in his 1724 play Hérode et Mariamne.

Although not popular with the theatre-going public, Artémire was sufficiently well-received at court to secure Voltaire's permission to return to Paris, from where he had been banished for offending the Regent.

== Printed editions ==
Voltaire retained the manuscript of the play. Two short fragments from the fourth act were first published by Pierre Desfontaines in the appendix to the Bernard edition of La Ligue in Amsterdam in 1724. A summary and arrangement of the surviving fragments was contained in the 1785 in the Kehl edition of Voltaire's works. Additional fragments from a manuscript of Decroix were incorporated into the Beuchot edition of the works of Voltaire (1829–1840).
