= Henry Baker (author) =

English author (1734–1766)

Henry Baker (1734–1766) was an English writer.

Baker was born at Enfield, Middlesex, 10 February 1734, the second son of Henry Baker, F.R.S., and Sophia, daughter of Daniel Defoe.

According to Nichols (Anecdotes of Bowyer, 416), he followed the profession of a lawyer, but in no creditable line. He contributed occasional poetry and essays to periodicals, and in 1756 published, in two volumes, Essays Pastoral and Elegiac. Wilson, in his Life of Defoe, states that he died 24 August 1776, and was buried in the churchyard of St. Mary-le-Strand beside his mother, but the parish register gives the date of his burial as 24 August 1766. According to Chalmers, he left ready for the press an arranged collection of all the statutes relating to bankruptcy, with cases, precedents, &c., entitled The Clerk to the Commission, which is supposed to have been published under another title in 1768. His son, William Baker, born 1763, afterwards rector of Lyndon and South Luffenham, Rutland, inherited the property and papers of Henry Baker, F.R.S.
