= Stephen Jones (editor) =

English literary editor (1763–1827)

Stephen Jones (1763–1827) was an English literary editor, best known for his revision of the Biographia Dramatica.

== Life ==
Eldest son of Giles Jones, secretary to the York Buildings Water Company, and nephew of Griffith Jones (1722–1786), he was born in London in 1763, and admitted to St Paul's School, London on 24 April 1775. He was first placed under a sculptor, but afterwards apprenticed to a printer in Fetter Lane. On the expiration of his indentures he became a corrector for the press.

He was employed by William Strahan for four years, and afterwards by Thomas Wright in Peterborough Court. On Wright's death, in March 1797, he undertook the editorship of the Whitehall Evening Post; with the decline of that journal he was appointed to the management, and became part proprietor, of the General Evening Post; which also declined in circulation, and was ultimately merged in the St. James's Chronicle. From 1797 to 1814 he compiled from the newspapers and other periodicals an amusing annual volume entitled ‘The Spirit of the Public Journals,’ of which a new series, with illustrations by George Cruikshank, appeared in 1823–1825.

On the death of Isaac Reed, in 1807, he became editor of the European Magazine; a committed freemason, for some years he ran the Freemasons' Magazine. In the end he had little literary employment. He died in Upper King Street, now Southampton Row, Holborn, on 20 December 1827. He married his first cousin, Christian, daughter of his uncle Griffith Jones.

== Works ==
His main publications are:

- Monthly Beauties, 1793.
- The History of Poland, 1795.
- A new Biographical Dictionary in Miniature, 2nd edit., London, 1796; 3rd edit., 1799; 4th edit., 1802; 5th edit., 1805; 6th edit., 1811; 8th edit., 1840.
- Masonic Miscellanies, in poetry and prose, London, 1797.
- Sheridan Improved. A general Pronouncing and Explanatory Dictionary of the English Language, London, 1798; 9th edit., London, 1804; stereotype edit., revised, London, 1816.
- Gray's Poetical Works, with illustrations, 1800.
- The Life and Adventures of a Fly [1800?].
- Burton's Anatomy of Melancholy, an edition in 2 vols., 1800.
- Dr. John Blair's Chronology, continued to 1802, London, 1803.
- A new edition of Thomas Davies's Life of Garrick, with additions, 2 vols., 1808.
- Biographia Dramatica; or a Companion to the Playhouse: containing Historical and Critical Memoirs and Original Anecdotes of British and Irish Dramatic Writers. … Originally compiled to the year 1764 by David Erskine Baker, continued thence to 1782 by Isaac Reed, and brought down to the end of November 1811, with very considerable Additions and Improvements throughout, by Stephen Jones, 3 vols. in 4, London, 1812. This edition superseded the former editions of 1764 and 1782. It was criticised by Octavius Gilchrist in the Quarterly Review, and the attack elicited from Jones a pamphlet entitled Hypercriticism Exposed (1812).
- A Vindication of Masonry from a charge of having given rise to the French Revolution, in George Oliver's Golden Remains of the early Masonic Writers, London, 1847, iii. 246.
