= Thomas Blore =

English topographer (1754–1818)

Thomas Blore (1754–1818) was an English topographer.

== Life ==
Blore was born at Ashbourne, Derbyshire, on 1 December 1764. He received his education at the grammar school there, and afterwards became a solicitor at Derby. He then moved to Hopton to take over the management of the affairs of Philip Eyre Gell.

After Eyre Gell's death in 1795 he left for London and entered the Middle Temple, though he was never called to the bar. In 1798 at Stapleford, Hertfordshire, he married the poet Dorothy Milnes (daughter and co-heir of William Milnes of Aldercar Park and widow of Eyre Gell). During a residence at Benwick Hall, near Hertford, he made extensive collections relating to the topography and antiquities of Hertfordshire. These filled three folio volumes of closely written manuscript, which formed the nucleus of Robert Clutterbuck's history of the county. Afterwards Blore lived successively at Mansfield Woodhouse, at Burr House near Bakewell, at Manton in Rutland, and at Stamford. The latter borough he unsuccessfully contested in the Whig interest, and he also edited for a brief period from 1809 John Drakard's Stamford News.

He died in London 10 November 1818, and was buried in St Mary on Paddington Green Church, where a stone bearing the following inscription was erected:

Sacred to the memory of Thomas Blore, Gentleman, of the honourable society of the Middle Temple and member of the Antiquarian Society, whose days were embittered and whose life was shortened by intense application. He died 10 November 1818, aged 63 years.

He was father of the architect Edward Blore.

== Works ==
He was an able and diligent topographer, but his labours brought few works to a successful termination. His publications are:

1. A History of the Manor and Manor-house of South Wingfield in Derbyshire, printed in Nichols's Miscellaneous Antiquities (in continuation of the Bibliotheca Topographica Britannica), vol. i. No. 3, 1791; reprinted separately, London, 1793
2. "Proposals for publishing a History of Derbyshire".
3. "A History of Alderwasley", in four pages, folio, as a specimen of his History of Derbyshire.
4. "A History of Breadsall Priory, in the county of Derby", printed in the Topographical Miscellany, 1791.
5. "A Statement of a Correspondence with Richard Phillips, Esq., respecting the “Antiquary’s Magazine", Stamford, 1807
6. The History and Antiquities of the County of Rutland, vol. i. pt. 2, Stamford, 1811. With many plates and genealogical tables. This was the only part published. It includes the East Hundred and the Hundred of Casterton Parva.
7. An Account of the Public Schools, Hospitals, and other Charitable Foundations in the borough of Stamford, in the counties of Lincoln and Rutland, Stamford, 1813
8. A Guide to Burghley House, Northamptonshire, the seat of the Marquis of Exeter; containing an Account of all the paintings, antiquities, &c., with biographical notices of the Artists, Stamford, 1815 (anonymous).
