= The Bath Unmasked =

Play by Gabriel Odingsells

- Original language: English
- Written by: Gabriel Odingsells
- Genre: Comedy

Premiere
- Date: 27 February 1725
- Place: Lincoln's Inn Fields Theatre

The Bath Unmasked is a 1725 comedy play by the British writer Gabriel Odingsells. The action takes place in the fashionable spa town of Bath.

Staged at the Lincoln's Inn Fields Theatre in London it lasted for six performances, considered a reasonable run for a comedy at the time. The original cast included Lacy Ryan as Sprightly, Anthony Boheme as Wiseman, John Egleton as Pander, John Hippisley as Sir Captious, Richard Diggs as Sharper, Jane Egleton as Lady Ambsace, Jane Rogers as Liberia, Henrietta Morgan as Tippet, Anne Parker as Cleora and Thomas Walker as Frippou.

== Bibliography ==
- Brown, Laura. Homeless Dogs & Melancholy Apes: Humans and Other Animals in the Modern Literary Imagination. Cornell University Press, 2010.
- Burling, William J. A Checklist of New Plays and Entertainments on the London Stage, 1700-1737. Fairleigh Dickinson Univ Press, 1992.
- Nicoll, Allardyce. A History of Early Eighteenth Century Drama: 1700-1750. CUP Archive, 1927.
