= Mariamne (Nadal play) =

Mariamne is a 1725 French tragedy by Augustin Nadal based around the Herodian dynasty. Nadal was encouraged to produce the play after his rival Voltaire's play on the same story had failed after only one performance the previous year (1724). However, at the play's February 1725 premiere at the Comédie-Française, the audience booed its opening scenes and demanded that Voltaire's play be put on instead.

Nadal was convinced his own Mariamne had failed because of Voltaire's "brigue horrible et scandaleuse" that set Paris against it, and said so in the preface to the printed play, accusing him of bringing a cabal into the audience at the premiere to disrupt it. This gave Voltaire the opportunity to reply under a pseudonym with withering compliments ("Lettre de M. Thieriot à M. l'Abbé Nadal", 1725), commiserating with Nadal, that it was solely the machinations of Voltaire's intrigues "that one hears it said so scandalously that you are the worst versifier of the century and the most tiresome writer." Voltaire's fine-honed savagery inspired Nadal to excise the uncomplimentary remarks about Voltaire in his prefaces when he came to collect and publish the plays in 1736 with others of his poems, in three small volumes. But it is in Voltaire's response that the abbé Nadal is remembered.

== Sources ==
- Marvin Carlson, Voltaire and the Theatre of the Eighteenth Century (Greenwood Publishing Group, 1998), pages 16–17
