= George Steevens =

English writer and scholar (1736–1800)

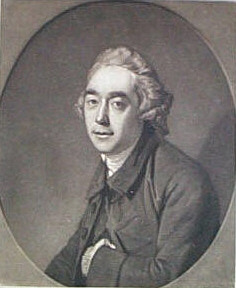
- Portrait of George Steevens, c. 1770
- Born: 10 May 1736; Poplar, London, England
- Died: 22 January 1800 (aged 63); London, England
- Occupations: Writer; scholar

George Steevens FRS (10 May 1736 – 22 January 1800) was an English writer and Shakespearean scholar. He was best known for collaborating with Samuel Johnson and Isaac Reed to produce The Plays of Shakespeare with the Corrections and Illustrations of Various Commentators (1773).

== Biography ==
=== Early life ===
George Steevens was born at Poplar, on 10 May 1736, the son of a captain and later director of the East India Company. He was educated at Eton College and at King's College, Cambridge, where he remained from 1753 to 1756. Leaving the university without a degree, he settled in chambers in the Inner Temple, moving later to a house on Hampstead Heath, where he collected a valuable library, rich in Elizabethan literature. He also accumulated a large collection of Hogarth prints, and his notes on the subject were incorporated in John Nichols's Genuine Works of Hogarth.

=== Career ===
Steevens walked from Hampstead to London every morning before seven o'clock, discussed Shakespearian questions with his friend, Isaac Reed, and, after making his daily round of the booksellers shops, returned to Hampstead. He began his work as a Shakespearean editor with reprints of the quarto editions of Shakespeare's plays, entitled Twenty of the Plays of Shakespeare ... (1766). Samuel Johnson was impressed by this work, and suggested that Steevens should prepare a complete edition of Shakespeare. The result, known as Johnson's and Steevens's edition, was The Plays of Shakespeare with the Corrections and Illustrations of Various Commentators (10 vols., 1773), Johnson's contributions to which were very slight.

This early attempt at a variorum edition was revised and reprinted in 1778, and further edited in 1785 by Reed; but in 1793 Steevens, who had asserted that he was now a dowager-editor, was persuaded by his jealousy of Edmond Malone to resume the task. The definitive result of his researches was embodied in an edition of fifteen volumes. He made changes in the text sometimes apparently with the sole object of showing how much abler he was as an emendator than Malone, but his wide knowledge of Elizabethan literature stood him in good stead, and subsequent editors have gone to his pages for parallel passages from contemporary authors. His deficiencies from the point of view of purely literary criticism are apparent from the fact that he excluded Shakespeare's sonnets and poems because, he wrote, "the strongest act of parliament that could be framed would fail to compel readers into their service."

In the 20 years between 1773 and 1793, Steevens was less harmlessly engaged in criticizing his fellows and playing malicious practical jokes on them. Dr Johnson, who was one of his staunchest friends, said he had come to live the life of an outlaw, but he was generous and to a small circle of friends civil and kind. After Johnson's death in Dec. 1784, he sent a series of anonymous items to the Public Advertiser promoting the claims of James Boswell as Johnson's biographer, mainly in order to vex the official biographer, Sir John Hawkins. He was one of the foremost in exposing the Chatterton-Rowley and the Ireland forgeries. He wrote an entirely fictitious account of the Java upas tree, derived from an imaginary Dutch traveller, which imposed on Erasmus Darwin, and he hoaxed the Society of Antiquaries with the tombstone of Hardicanute, supposed to have been dug up in Kennington, but really engraved with an Anglo-Saxon inscription of his own invention.

=== Death and legacy ===
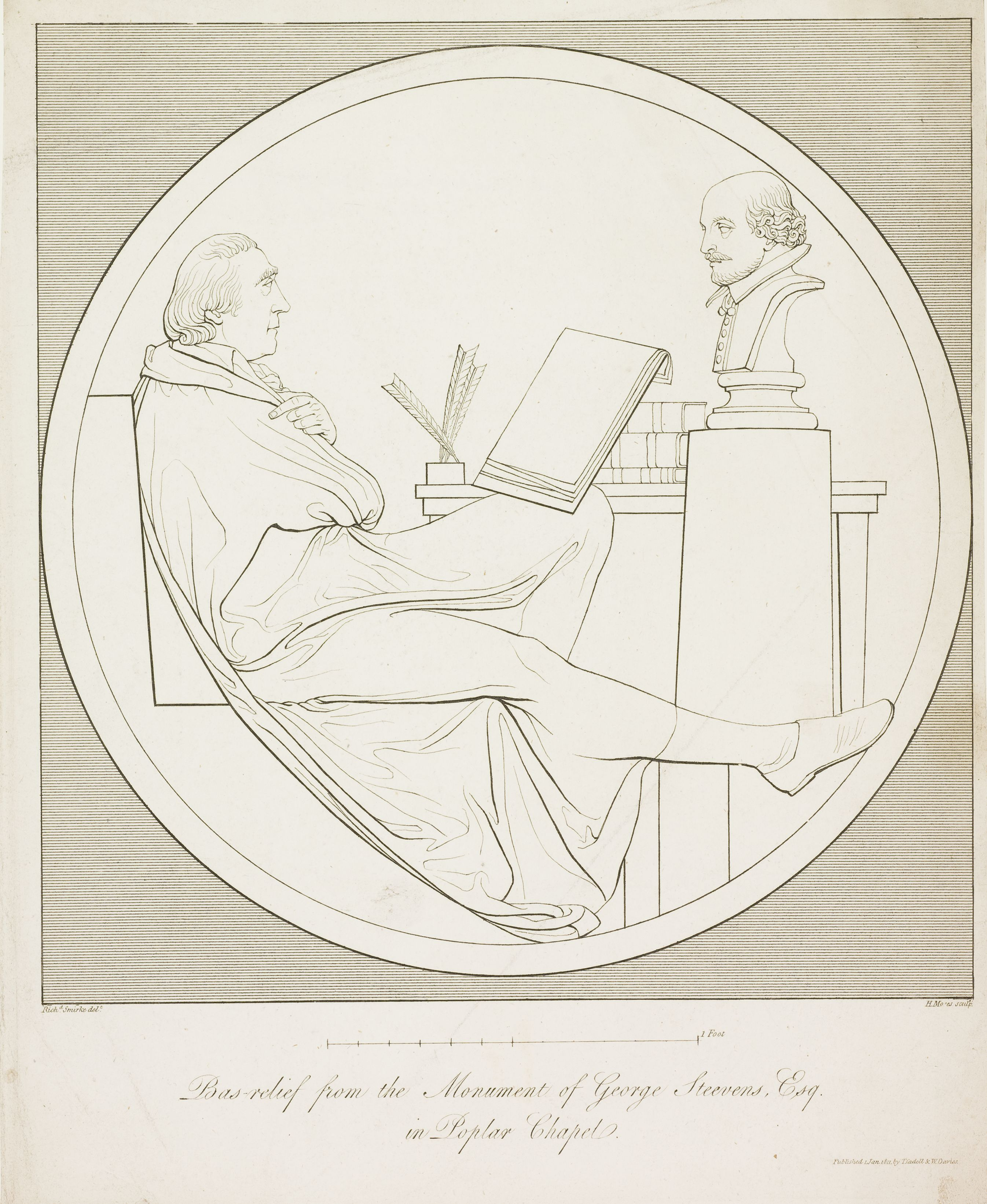
Design for the bas-relief from the Monument of George Steevens, by Richard Smirke

Steevens died at Hampstead on 22 January 1800. A monument to his memory by John Flaxman, with an inscription commemorating his Shakespearian labours, was erected in Poplar Chapel. The sale catalogue of his valuable library is in the British Museum.

Steevens's Shakespeare was re-issued by Reed in 1803, in 21 volumes, with additional notes left by Steevens. This, which is known as the first variorum edition, was reprinted in 1813.

=== Honours ===
Steevens was elected a Fellow of the Royal Society in May 1767.

== See also ==
- Shakespeare's editors
