= Richardson Pack =

English professional soldier and writer

Richardson Pack (1682–1728) was an English professional soldier and writer.

== Life ==
Born on 29 November 1682, was son of John Pack of Stoke Ash, High Sheriff of Suffolk cin 1697. His mother was daughter and coheiress of Robert Richardson of Tudhoe, County Durham. He was admitted in 1693 to Merchant Taylors' School, London. On 18 June 1697 he matriculated as a fellow-commoner at St John's College, Oxford, and stayed there for two years, when he left without taking his degree. As his father intended him for the law, he became in 1698 a student of the Middle Temple, and, after eight terms standing, was called to the bar; but he joined the army.

Pack's first command was in March 1705, when he was promoted to the head of a company of foot. His regiment served with Marshal Staremberg in November 1710 at the battle of Villa Viciosa, where his bravery attracted the notice of John Campbell, 2nd Duke of Argyll, who advanced him to the post of major, and became his friend. Pack's subsequent movements are known from his poems. He was at Mombris in Catalonia in October 1709, when he addressed some lines to John Creed of Oundle in Northamptonshire, and during the winter of 1712–13 he was writing to the Campbells from Menorca. In June 1714 he was at Ipswich, and in the following August was living at Stoke Ash.

Pack had returned to London by 1719, and was living in Jermyn Street, St. James's, but by 1722 he was at Bury St Edmunds in Suffolk. There he remained for some years, and in the spring of 1724 was dangerously ill, but recovered under the care of Dr. Richard Mead. Early in 1725 he moved to Exeter, but he followed Colonel Montagu's regiment, in which he was then a major, when it was ordered to Aberdeen. He died at Aberdeen in September 1728.

== Works ==
Edmund Curll printed for Pack in 1719 The Life of T. P. Atticus, with remarks, translated from the Latin of Cornelius Nepos; and in 1735 there appeared The Lives of T. P. Atticus, Miltiades, and Cimon, with remarks,

When Curll issued in 1725 a volume called Miscellanies in Verse and Prose, written by the Right Honourable Joseph Addison, he added to it an essay on the Roman elegiac poets, by Pack, which seems to have originally appeared in 1721. The English essay was by him, but the translation into Latin was by another hand. Many versions from the Latin poets were included in the Miscellanies of Pack: translations from Tibullus and Propertius, and imitations of Horace and Virgil, with poetic epistles to his friends. It also contains prose ‘essays in two letters to Captain David Campbell. The second edition of the Miscellanies is dated in 1719, and included more translations, the prologue to George Sewell's Tragedy of Sir Walter Raleigh, and the life of William Wycherley (prefixed in 1728 to an edition of the Posthumous Works of Wm. Wycherley).

Curll in 1725 issued Pack's New Collection of Miscellanies in Prose and Verse, to which are prefixed An Elegiac Epistle to Major Pack, signed W. Bond, Bury St. Edmunds, 1725, and shorter pieces by various hands. It included a letter from John Dennis on Wycherley, which was inserted in the first volume of the ‘Letters of John Dennis,’ 1721. Both sets of Miscellanies were printed at Dublin in 1726, and there appeared in London in 1729 a posthumous volume of The whole Works of Major R. Pack.

In March 1719 Curll advertised a poem by Pack, entitled Morning; and he printed in 1720 a tale called Religion and Philosophy, with five other pieces. Pack's prologue to Sewell's Tragedy of Sir Walter Raleigh, and his epilogue to Thomas Southerne's The Spartan Dame, were admired. Lines to Pack by Sewell are in Sewell's New Collection (1720), in his Poems (1719), and his Posthumous Works (1728). Two of Pack's poems are in Robert Southey's Specimens of the Later English Poets (i. 266–70).

The Letter from a supposed Nun in Portugal to a Gentleman in France, by Colonel Pack, which was added to a volume of Letters written by Mrs. Manley, 1696, and reissued in 1725 as A Stage-coach Journey to Exeter, by Mrs. Manley, with the Force of Love, or the Nun's Complaint, by the Hon. Colonel Pack, has been attributed to him, improbably.
