= Whitehall Evening Post =

London newspaper

The Whitehall Evening Post was a London newspaper, founded in September 1718 by Daniel Defoe.

The newspaper was initially published on Tuesdays, Thursdays, and Saturdays. Defoe left it in June 1720, but it continued to exist until the end of the century. It closed in 1801, with issue 8487 and was merged with the English Chronicle.

Its editors included Thomas Leach, and finally Stephen Jones.
