= David Erskine Baker =

English dramatist (1730-1767)

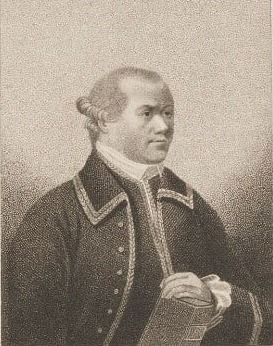
- Born: 30 January 1730; London
- Died: 16 February 1767
- Occupation: Writer
- Spouse: Elizabeth Clendon
- Parents: Henry Baker (father); Sofia Defoe (mother)
- Relatives: Henry Baker

David Lionel Erskine Baker (30 January 1730 – 16 February 1767) was an English writer on drama.

== Life ==
David Lionel Erskine Baker was the son of Henry Baker, F.R.S., and his wife, the youngest daughter of Daniel Defoe. Baker was born in the parish of St Dunstan-in-the-West in the City of London, on 30 January 1730, and named after his godfather, David Erskine, 9th Earl of Buchan. When he showed a taste for mathematics, John Montagu, 2nd Duke of Montagu, master of the ordnance, placed him in the drawing room of the Tower of London, to qualify him for the duties of a royal engineer. In a letter of 1747 to Philip Doddridge his father wrote

At twelve years old, he had translated the whole twenty-four books of "Telemachus" from the French; before he was fifteen he translated from the Italian, and published, a treatise on physic of Dr. Cocchi of Florence concerning the diet and doctrines of Pythagoras, and last year, before he was seventeen, he likewise published a treatise of Sir Isaac Newton's "Metaphysics" compared with those of Dr. Leibniz, from the French of M. Voltaire'.

Communications from David Erskine Baker were printed in the Philosophical Transactions, but he married the actress Elizabeth Clendon on 6 August 1752, and joined a company of actors. In 1764 he published his Companion to the Play House. A revised edition, under the title of Biographia Dramatica, appeared in 1782, edited by Isaac Reed. In the second edition, Baker's name is given among the list of dramatic authors, and we are told that 'being adopted by an uncle who was a silk throwster in Spital Fields, he succeeded him in his business; but wanting the prudence and attention which are necessary to secure success in trade he soon failed'. In compiling his Companion Baker was largely indebted to Gerard Langbaine. He adds little concerning the early dramatists. but his work is useful for the history of the stage during the first half of the eighteenth century.

He also wrote a small dramatic piece, The Muse of Ossian (1763), and translated an Italian comedy in two acts, The Maid and the Mistress (La Serva Padrona) which was performed at Edinburgh in 1763 and published the same year.

Stephen Jones, editor of the third edition of the Companion (1812), says that he died in obscurity at Edinburgh about 1770, while John Nichols gives 16 February 1767 as the date of his death in his Literary Anecdotes of the Eighteenth Century.
