= Variorum =

Specialist term for a work that collates all known variants of a text

A variorum, short for (editio) cum notis variorum, is a work that collates all known variants of a text. It is a work of textual criticism, whereby all variations and emendations are set side by side so that a reader can track how textual decisions have been made in the preparation of a text for publication. The Bible and the works of William Shakespeare have often been the subjects of variorum editions, although the same techniques have been applied with less frequency to many other works.

== Etymology ==
The word variorum is Latin for 'of various [persons]' and derives from the phrase cum notis variorum ('with notes by various people') which was often used in the title-pages of Dutch books of the 17th century.

== Original meaning ==
An older meaning of the word refers not to the text itself but to the assortment of illustrative notes printed with it: "an edition of a text (usually Latin or Greek) which includes annotations by a variety of critics and commentators". Variorum editions of this kind were a speciality of Dutch publishers of the 17th century, including the house of Elzevir. In these editions the text is usually taken, with little or no attempt at constructive modification, from a single widely accepted critical edition of the period; the interest lies in the notes, which often fill three-quarters of each page, and which typically embody the complete commentaries of two or three recognised specialists in the work of the author in question, together with selected passages from several other commentators. The notes will usually include textual variants, both documented and conjectural, together with examples of parallel usages and (for non-fiction texts) historical information. Usually some middle-ranking literary man was appointed as general editor; occasionally, however, a first-rate scholar would preside over the edition and include original work of his own within it, Nicolaas Heinsius's edition of Claudian (Elsevier, 1661) being a good example.

== Notable variorum editions ==
A variorum of the Bible has been produced at various times in history and of various scopes. Documenting each line of text with all variants in wording, from all known source documents, presented chronologically, helps translators of the Bible establish primacy and prevalence of various line readings.

There have also been noteworthy variorums of the works of William Shakespeare, including the readings of all quartos and folios; the textual decisions, or choices, of past editors; and a compilation of all critical notes. The first was that of Isaac Reed in 1803. Variorum editions help editors and scholars understand the historical evolution of the Shakespeare texts, whether to decode dubious lines and elucidate claims of authorial intent or using a more contextualist hermeneutics to uncover other explanations for the textual variations.

Isaac Newton's Philosophiae Naturalis Principia Mathematica, Vol. I & II, Third Edition (1726) with Variant Readings, was assembled in 1972 by I. Bernard Cohen, Alexandre Koyré and Anne Whitman, published by Harvard University Press ISBN 978-0674664753

Immanuel Kant's Critique of Pure Reason is typically presented in variorum format, with both the 1781 and 1787 editions printed side-by-side in nearly all modern editions.

Charles Darwin's The Origin of Species went through six editions with extensive changes. The text became a third larger, with numerous parts rewritten five times. A variorum was published in 1959.

There is also a variorum of Leaves of Grass. Walt Whitman produced either six or nine editions during his lifetime. The New York University Press produced a variorum in 1980 of these various editions.

The James Strachey translation of Freud's The Interpretation of Dreams in volumes four and five of The Standard Edition of The Complete Psychological Works of Sigmund Freud collates eight editions.
