= The European Magazine =

Defunct monthly magazine in London

European Magazine
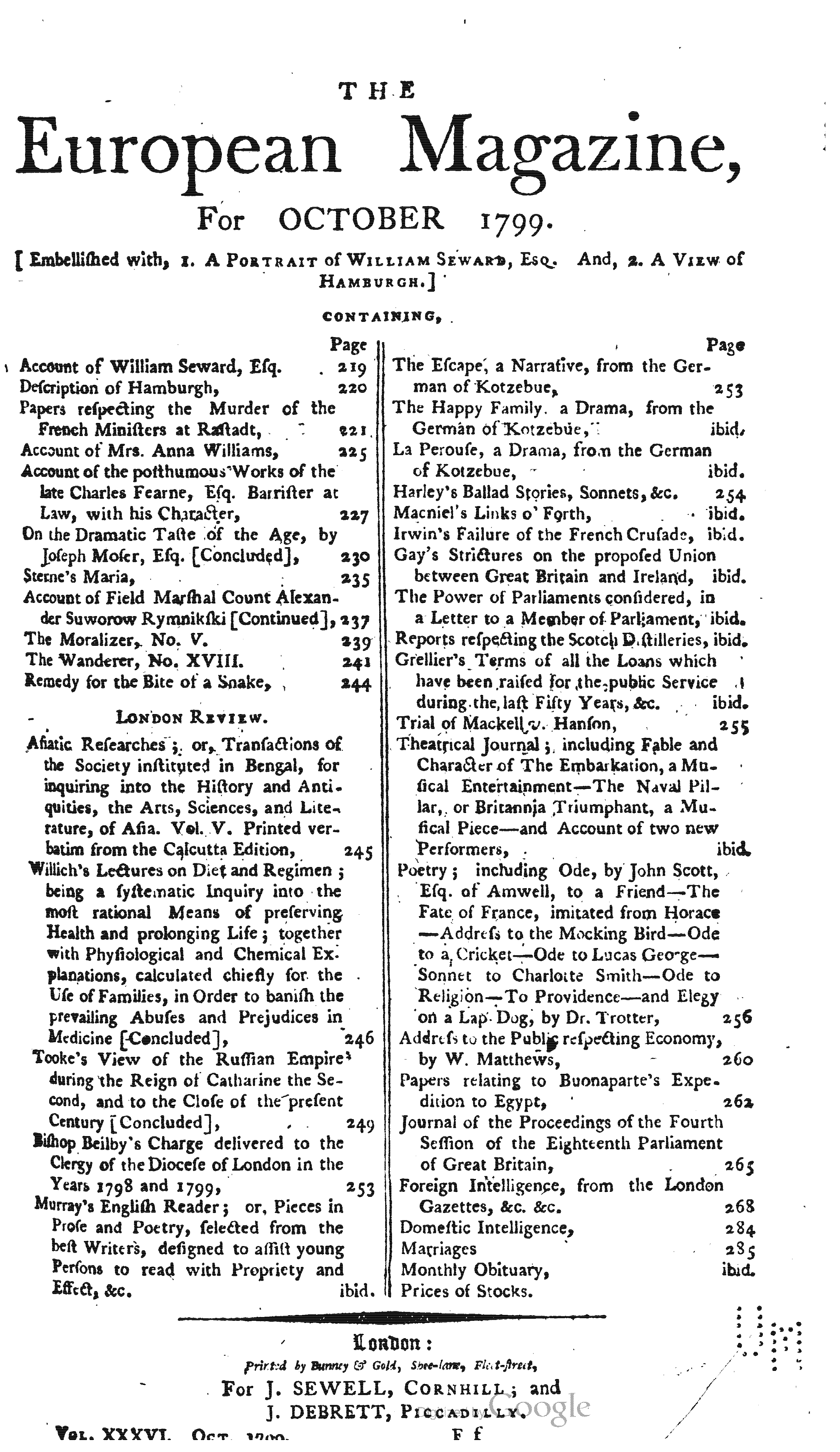
- Front page, October 1799
- Editor: 1782: James Perry; 1782–1807: Isaac Reed; 1807–c.1820: Stephen Jones c.1820–?: Alfred Beauchamp
- Frequency: Monthly
- Circulation: 3,250 (late 1700s)
- Founder: James Perry
- First issue: January 1782
- Final issue: June 1826
- Country: United Kingdom
- Based in: London
- Language: English

The European Magazine (sometimes referred to as European Magazine) was a monthly magazine published in London. Eighty-nine semi-annual volumes were published from 1782 until 1826. It was launched as the European Magazine, and London Review in January 1782, issued by London Philological Society, promising to offer "the Literature, History, Politics, Arts, Etiquette, and Amusements of the Age." It was in direct competition with The Gentleman's Magazine, and in 1826 was absorbed into the Monthly Magazine.

Soon after launching the European Magazine, its founding editor, James Perry, passed proprietorship to the Shakespearean scholar Isaac Reed and his partners John Sewell and Daniel Braithwaite, who guided the magazine during its first two decades.

The articles and other contributions in the magazine appeared over initials or pseudonyms and have largely remained anonymous. Scholars believe that the contributions include the first published poem by William Wordsworth (1787) and the earliest known printing of "O Sanctissima", the popular Sicilian Mariners Hymn (1792).

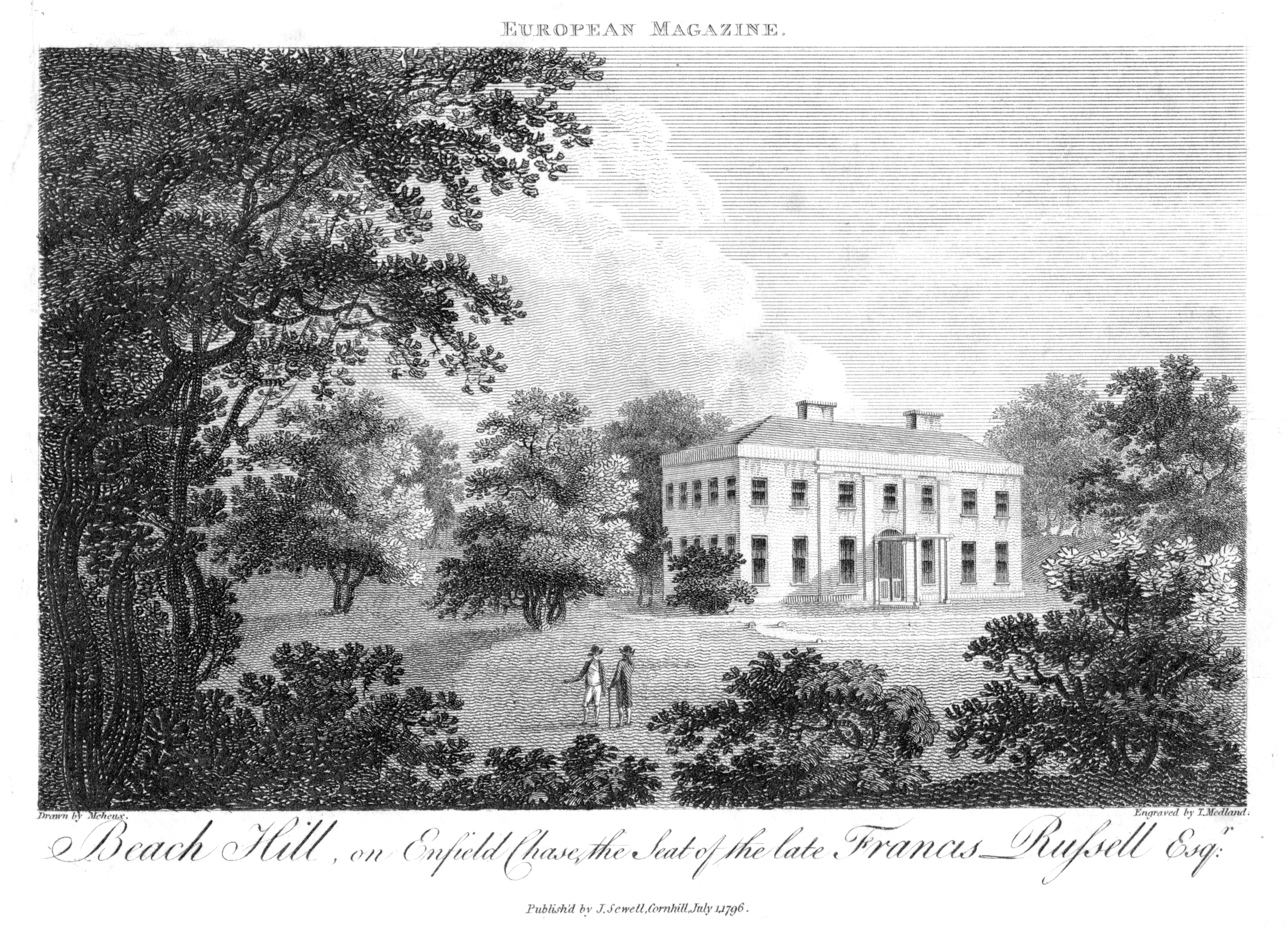
Beech Hill Park, as illustrated in European Magazine, 1796.
