= Augustin Nadal =

The abbé Augustin Nadal (1659 – 7 August 1741) was the writer of plays, through the failure of which he became the butt of a withering public reply from Voltaire that has rendered the abbé immortal.

He was born in Poitiers, Poitou. Having finished his studies there, he was appointed tutor to the young comte de Valançay, who was killed at the battle of Blenheim (1704). Nadal put himself under the patronage of the house of Aumont. He was received in 1706 into the Académie des Inscriptions et Belles-Lettres. With Jean-Aymar Piganiol de La Force, he took on the editing of the Nouveau Mercure until 1711, a premature force for literary modernism that was not successful.

In 1712 he was secretary of the embassy of the duc d'Aumont to London as liaison from his King Louis XIV to Anne, Queen of Great Britain, in the negotiations that led up to the Treaty of Utrecht. In 1716 he was appointed abbot in commendam of the Abbey of Doudeauville.

Aside from his academic dissertations and his Histoire des Vestales ("History of the Vestal Virgins") (1725), which caused a stir of interest in this aspect of ancient Rome, the Abbé Nadal composed five tragedies: Saül (1705), Hérode (1709), Antiochus, ou les Machabées (1722), Mariamne (1725) and Osarphis, all on classical or biblical subjects.

He was included in Le Parnasse françois project of Évrard Titon du Tillet, which provoked Voltaire's sarcastic epigram. Nadal was convinced his tragedy of Mariamne had failed because of Voltaire's "brigue horrible et scandaleuse" that set Paris against it, and said so in the preface to the printed play, giving Voltaire the opportunity to reply under a pseudonym with withering compliments ("Lettre de M. Thieriot à M. l'Abbé Nadal", 1725), commiserating with Nadal, that it was solely the machinations of Voltaire's intrigues "that one hears it said so scandalously that you are the worst versifier of the century and the most tiresome writer." Voltaire's fine-honed savagery inspired Nadal to excise the uncomplimentary remarks about Voltaire in his prefaces when he came to collect and publish the plays in 1736 with others of his poems, in three small volumes. But it is in Voltaire's response that the abbé Nadal is remembered.
