= Isaac Reed =

English writer and scholar (1742–1807)

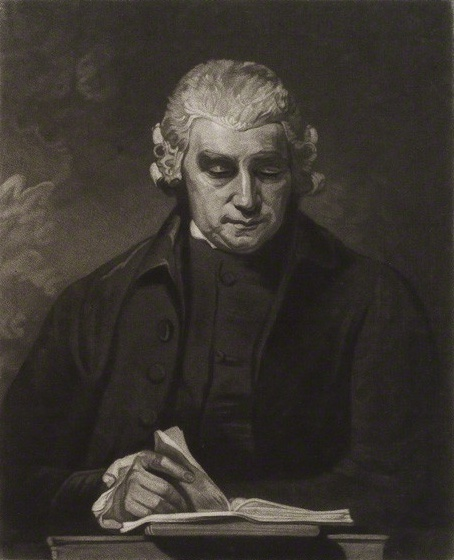
- Portrait of Isaac Reed, 1816
- Born: 1 January 1742; London, England
- Died: 5 January 1807 (aged 65); London, England
- Occupations: Writer; scholar

Isaac Reed (1 January 1742 – 5 January 1807) was an English writer and Shakespearean scholar. He is best known for collaborating with Samuel Johnson and George Steevens to edit The Plays of William Shakespeare and publishing a critical edition.

== Biography ==
The son of a baker, he was born in London. He was articled to a solicitor, and eventually set up as a conveyancer at Staple Inn, where he had a large practice.

His major work was the Biographia dramatica (2 vols., 1782), a set of biographies of dramatists and a descriptive dictionary of their plays. This book, which was an enlargement of David Erskine Baker's Companion to the Playhouse (2 vols., 1764), was re-edited (3 vols.) by Stephen Jones in 1811. The original work by Baker had been based on Gerard Langbaine's Account of the English Dramatick Poets (1691), Giles Jacob's Poetical Register (1719), Thomas Whincop's List of all the Dramatic Authors (printed with his tragedy of Scanderbeg, 1747) and the manuscripts of Thomas Coxeter. Reed's Notitia dramatica (British Library, Add MSS 25390–25392), supplementary to the Biographia, was never published.

He also revised Robert Dodsley's Collection of Old Plays (12 vols., 1780); and re-edited Samuel Johnson and George Steevens's edition (1773) of Shakespeare. Reed's edition was published in ten volumes (1785), and he gave great assistance to Steevens in his edition (1793). He was Steevens's literary executor, and in 1803 published another edition (21 vols.) based on Steevens's later collections. This, which is known as the first variorum, was re-issued ten years later.

Reed directed the European Magazine as a proprietor and editor, from 1782 for the duration of his life. After his death, his library of theatrical literature was catalogued for sale as Bibliotheca Reediana (1807).

In 2016, it was announced that a Shakespeare First Folio had been discovered in the library of Mount Stuart House. The book was identified as a working copy once owned by Reed, who had bought it in 1786.
