= Précis du siècle de Louis XV =

Work by Voltaire

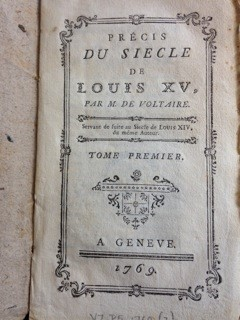
Title page of a first edition, from the collection of the Voltaire Foundation in Oxford

Précis du siècle de Louis XV (Short history of the Age of Louis XV) is a historical work by the French philosopher and author Voltaire, first published in its own right 1768. Celebrating the progress of Enlightenment ideas and the retreat of prejudice, it comments on cultural, economic and technological progress made in the Kingdom of France during the reign of King Louis XV.

== Background ==
The material for the Précis had previously been part of a history that Voltaire spent twenty years working on and which included Essai sur les mœurs et l'esprit des nations (Essay on the customs and spirit of the nations) and The Age of Louis XIV. The Precis was introduced in 1762 as an appendix within this larger work, but later published separately.

== Content ==
Voltaire comments on the trial of Thomas Arthur, comte de Lally; a case he had been following closely. Lally had been a successful military officer, and personally known to Voltaire. When Lally was involved at a military defeat, relinquishing the Indian town of Pondicherry to the English, his fellow officers blamed him. On his return to France, Lally was imprisoned without charge, put on trial in which he was denied a lawyer, and finally executed. In his account of the case, Voltaire wrote, "His character made him detested by all who had to do with him. But that is not a reason for cutting off a man's head. The briefs both for and against him, which I have read attentively, contain nothing but insults, and not the least proof."

The Precis also praises the courage of the Corsicans in defending against the French at the Battle of Ponte Novu. Voltaire writes:

The principal weapon of the Corsicans was their courage. This courage was so great that in one of these battles, near a river named Golo, they made a rampart of their dead in order to have the time to reload behind them before making a necessary retreat […] Bravery is found everywhere, but such actions aren’t seen except among free people.
