= Essai sur les mœurs et l'esprit des nations =

1756 philosophy essay

Essai sur les mœurs
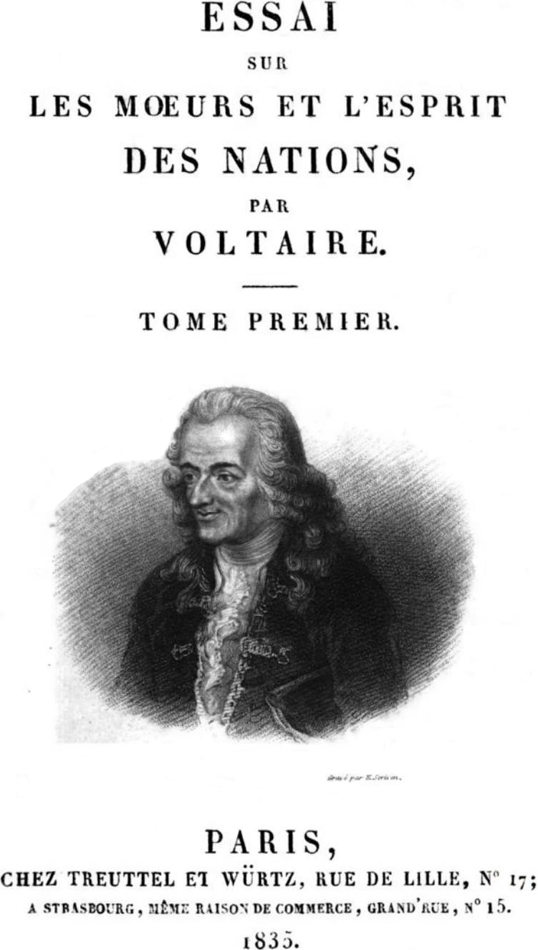
- Title page of an 1835 edition with a portrait of the author
- Author: Voltaire
- Original title: Essai sur les mœurs et l'esprit des nations et sur les principaux faits de l'histoire depuis Charlemagne jusqu'à Louis XIII
- Language: French
- Subject: History of Europe
- Genre: Philosophy, history
- Publication date: 1756
- Publication place: France

Essai sur les mœurs et l'esprit des nations (translated to English as "An Essay on Universal History, the Manners, and Spirit of Nations") is a work by the French writer, historian, and philosopher Voltaire, published for the first time in 1756. It discusses the history of Europe before Charlemagne until the dawn of the age of Louis XIV, also addressing the colonies and the East.

The 197-chapter work resulted from fifteen years of research by Voltaire at Cirey, Brussels, Paris, Lunéville, Prussia, Alsace and Geneva.

Voltaire revised the text until his death in 1778, expanding an Appendix with defence of the work and responses to criticism.

== Content ==
The Essai is a work of Enlightenment philosophy as much as of history. It urges the active rejection of superstition and fable, and the need to replace them with knowledge based on reason. Voltaire traced common themes across various human cultures and languages, explained by a shared reality but also by shared human failings, such as superstitions and dreams, that kept humans from appreciating this reality.

Voltaire was reacting against Jacques-Bénigne Bossuet's Discourse on Universal History, which had presented Judeo-Christian nations as the most advanced. In contrast, the Essai praised ancient China and India. Voltaire also attempted to refute prejudices about the Muslim world, according to which the Ottoman Empire and all other Muslim states were despotisms in which individuals had no rights and no property of their own. He countered that these states differed among each other, just as Christian states did. He also argued that none of them were treating their subjects as slaves. He pointed out that European feudalism gave individuals no more rights than a typical person in Turkey or Prussia.

While arguing that Christianity was not essential for a civilised and highly moral society, Voltaire countered writers, including Pierre Bayle, who had used China as an example of a morally advanced culture based on atheism. Pointing to Chinese classic literature, including Confucius, Voltaire wrote that all societies, China included, had recognised a supreme being. They consequently used ideas of this being as a basis for their morality.

Voltaire credited his intellectual partner Émilie du Châtelet as an influence: She had criticised works of history that were dull lists of facts. The Essai was written to show that history could be readable and engaging so as to "enlighten the soul" rather than weigh it down.

== Reception ==
The Jesuit preacher Claude-Adrien Nonnotte spent much of his life opposing the view on Christianity that Voltaire had taken in the Essai. At first, he anonymously published Examen critique ou Réfutation du livre des moeurs ("Critical examination or refutation of the book of customs"). Over the next twenty years, he wrote a succession of revised editions of this work, which was translated into Italian, German, Polish, and Portuguese. Voltaire, in turn, responded with criticisms of Nonnotte in revised editions of the Essai and in his Eclaircissements historiques ("Historical clarifications").

The critic Paul Sakmann praised the Essai as "large-scale, critically-sifted, and treated in a philosophical spirit". Siófra Pierse in 2013 wrote that it is "a magisterial work of compression, summary, synthesis and selectivity." Saul Anton in 2012 described it as "a masterpiece of prose that pioneered many of the foundations of modern historical study and a style of historical discourse that placed the reader’s experience at the center."

== Published editions ==
- "Essai sur les mœurs et l’esprit des nations", Critical edition, in Œuvres complètes de Voltaire, (Voltaire Foundation, Oxford) Volumes: 22 ISBN 978-0-7294-0874-5, 23 ISBN 978-0-7294-0946-9, 24 ISBN 978-0-7294-0974-2, 25 ISBN 978-0-7294-0975-9, 26A ISBN 978-0-7294-0976-6, 26B ISBN 978-0-7294-0977-3, 26C ISBN 978-0-7294-1145-5
- "Essai sur les mœurs et l'esprit des nations et sur les principaux faits de l'histoire depuis Charlemagne jusqu'à Louis XIII." edited by René Pomeau (1990) in 2 Volumes (Garnier frères, Paris) OCLC 70306666
