= Nyasvizh Jesuit printing house =

18th-century printing house in Nyasvizh

- Belarusian: Нясвіжская друкарня
- Founded: 1750
- Founders: Radziwiłł family
- Defunct: 1790s
- Type: Printing house
- Location: Nyasvizh, Grand Duchy of Lithuania
- Products: Books, engravings
- Key people: Hirsz Leybowicz
- Parent organization: Nyasvizh Jesuit Collegium

The Nyasvizh Jesuit printing house (Belarusian: Нясвіжская езуіцкая друкарня) was a printing press in Nyasvizh (now in Belarus) that operated from 1750 to the 1790s.

Founded by the Radziwiłł family, it was donated to the local Nyasvizh Jesuit Collegium in 1751.

The famous engraver Hirsz Leybowicz worked at the printing house. During its existence, about 70 publications were printed, including fiction, religious, polemical, and educational works, as well as panegyrics in Polish and Latin.

Among the most notable publications are:

- The History of Alexander the Great by Quintus Curtius Rufus (1763);
- The Life and Heresies of Voltaire by F. Nonnotte (1781);
- Military Articles (1754);
- The album of copper engravings Icones familiae ducalis Radivilianae (1758), which included 165 portraits.

== See also ==
- Nyasvizh printing house (16th century)
- Jesuit printing

== Bibliography ==
- "Нясвіжская друкарня". Вялікае княства Літоўскае: Энцыклапедыя [Grand Duchy of Lithuania: Encyclopedia] (in Belarusian). Vol. 2. Мінск: Беларуская Энцыклапедыя. 2005. p. 361. ISBN 985-11-0378-0.
- Мальдзіс А. І. (1974). "Кнігадрукаванне Беларусі ў XVIII ст.". Книга, библиотечное дело и библиография в Белоруссии [Book, Library Science and Bibliography in Belorussia] (in Russian). Мінск.
- Шматаў В. Ф. (1984). Беларуская кніжная гравюра XVI—XVIII стст. [Belarusian Book Engraving of the 16th–18th Centuries] (in Belarusian). Мінск: Навука і тэхніка. pp. 170–175.
- Сапега Т. Гісторыя друкарскай дзейнасці Радзівілаў у Нясвіжы [History of the Radziwiłłs' Printing Activity in Nyasvizh]. Беларускі фестываль камернай музыкі «Музы Нясвіжа» — 10 год разам (in Belarusian). Мінск.
