= Gregory S. Brown =

American historian

- Born: February 3, 1968, New York, NY
- Education: University of Pennsylvania, Columbia University
- Known for: Early Modern French history, Age of Enlightenment, French Revolution, eighteenth century France
- Spouse: Jessica Brown 2006-2017 (div)
- Children: Aaron Brown, Sophia Brown
- Scientific career
- Fields: History
- Workplaces: Columbia University; University of Nevada, Las Vegas; University of Oxford
- Doctoral advisor: Isser Woloch

Gregory Stephen Brown is an American historian specializing in French history and cultural History. His research regards "Enlightenment France and issues of 'self-fashioning,' performance and printing, patronage, and censorship." He is the General Editor and Senior Research Fellow at the Voltaire Foundation, University of Oxford, for the Oxford University Studies in the Enlightenment.

From 2009 through 2012, he served on the campus and state board of the Nevada Faculty Alliance, which is the Nevada conference of the American Association of University Professors, serving as president from 2010 - 2012. From 2012 - 2016, he served as Vice Provost of University of Nevada, Las Vegas with responsibility for faculty affairs, academic and research policy and strategic planning.

== Bibliography ==
=== Books ===
- Eighteenth-Century Europe: Tradition and Progress, 2nd ed (with Isser Woloch), (Norton: 2012) ISBN 0393929876
- Literary Sociability and Literary Property in France, 1775–1793: Beaumarchais, the Société des Auteurs Dramatiques and the Comédie Française (Studies in European Cultural Transition Book 33) Mar 2, 2017. ISBN 0754603865.
- A Field of Honor: Writers, Court Culture and Public Theater in French Literary Life from Racine to the Revolution (Columbia University Press/ EPIC: 2002). ISBN 978-0231124607
- Cultures in Conflict: The French Revolution (Greenwood Publishing Group, 2003). ISBN 978-0231124607.

=== Articles and working papers ===
- "Beaumarchais, Social Experience and Literary Figures in Eighteenth-Century Life," SVEC 2005:04 143 – 170.
- "Règlements royaux et régles du jeu: La propriete litteraire à la Comédie Française au XVIIIe siècle," Révue d'histoire moderne et contemporaine (2004).
- "Reconsidering the Censorship of Writers in Enlightenment-Era France," Journal of Modern History (June 2003).
- "Social Hierarchy and Self-Image in the Age of Enlightenment: The Utility of Norbert Elias for 18th-Century French Historiography," Journal of Early Modern History 6:1 (Feb. 2002).
- "The Self-Fashionings of Olympe de Gouges, 1784 – 1789," Eighteenth-Century Studies 34:1 (Spring 2001) 383 – 402.
- "The Coming of the French Revolution in Multi-Media," History Teacher 34: 2 (2001) 1 – 14.
- "After the Fall: The Chute of a Play, Droits d'auteurp, and Propripéptpé littérairen the Old Regimei," French Historical Studies 22:4 (Fall 1999) 82 – 99 .
- "Scripting the Patriotic Playwright in Enlightenment-era France: Louis-Sébastien Mercier's Self-Fashionings, between Court and Public," Historical Reflections26:1 (2000) 1 – 27.
- "Dramatic Authorship and the Honor of Men of Letters in Eighteenth-Century France," Studies on Eighteenth-Century Culture 27 (1998) 257 – 281.
- "Beaumarchais and the 'Mémoire sur la "Préface" de Nadir', "Romance Notes XXXVII: 3 (March 1997) 239 – 249. (Co-authored with Donald C. Spinelli).
- "Playwriting and Cultural Capital: The Société des Auteurs Dramatiques and the Comédie Française," Studies on Voltaire and the Eighteenth Century 347 (1997).
- "Le Fuel de Méricourt and the Journal des théâtres: An Episode in the Politics of Culture in Prerevolutionary France." French History IX:1 (March 1995) 1-28.
- "Critical Responses to Utopian Writings in the French Enlightenment: Three Periodicals as Case Studies." Utopian Studies V:1 (1994) 48 – 71.
