= The Age of Louis XIV =

Historical book by Voltaire

- Louis XIV
- Author: Voltaire
- Original title: Le Siècle de Louis XIV
- Language: French
- Subject: History of France
- Genre: History, historiography
- Publication date: 1751
- Publication place: France

The Age of Louis XIV (Le Siècle de Louis XIV, also translated The Century of Louis XIV) is a historical work by the French historian, philosopher, and writer Voltaire, first published in 1751. Through it, the French 17th century became identified with King Louis XIV, who reigned from 1643 to 1715.

== Background ==
A letter in May 1732 is the first recorded mention of Voltaire's intent to write a history of the reign of Louis XIV. He stopped and resumed the project multiple times, expressing the fear that he might not live long enough to complete it. For preparation, he read two hundred volumes of material, plus many unpublished memoirs, as well as historical documents he found in the archives of the Louvre.

== Content ==
In common with other Enlightenment philosophers, Voltaire saw the age of Alexander the Great and Pericles, the age of Caesar and Augustus, and the Italian Renaissance as "great ages" or "ages of light". He presented the age of Louis XIV as the fourth and greatest.

The period covered by the history corresponds neither to the 17th century nor the reign of Louis XIV, running from the last years of Cardinal Richelieu to the years after Louis XIV's death, in 36 chapters. Voltaire described this as the age in which the arts and philosophy achieved their greatest perfection. By praising the excellence of a past age, he implicitly criticised the reign of Louis XV as an age of decline.

Voltaire repeatedly remarked that he aimed less at a conventional history of great men and events, than something like a painting: he highlighted historical and cultural trends in the way that a painter brings out shadings of light and color which may be more important than the ostensible subject depicted. Rather than chronicling military victories, he saw more greatness in the progress of reason and culture, such as the advance of art or the rejection of medieval superstition and the end of imprisonment for sorcery.

== Reception ==
The Protestant writer Laurent Angliviel de la Beaumelle published an annotated version of the book, Notes sur le siècle de Louis XIV, in 1753, adding many attacks against Voltaire.

In the early 19th century, the English writer Hannah More wrote that Voltaire had "decorated both the period and the king with so much that is great and brilliant, that they fill a large space in the eye of the reader." The American writer Virginia Randolph Cary wrote in 1828 that "Voltaire's General History, and his Age of Lewis XIV, will always be read with pleasure."

The publication of new editions of The Age of Louis XIV in the late 20th century helped to renew interest in Voltaire as a historian. Modern scholars have described it as "the foundational text of French literary history" and "a milestone on the road to modern history-writing".

== Published editions ==
- The Age of Louis XIV, translated by Martyn Percy Pollack 1961 (London: J. M. Dent; New York: E. P. Dutton) ISBN 9780460007801
- Siècle de Louis XIV, critical edition edited by Diego Venturino and others, in The Complete Works of Voltaire (Oxford: The Voltaire Foundation)
  - Introduction in Volume 11A (2019) ISBN 978-0-7294-1146-2
  - Introduction, dossier, index général in Volume 11B (2019) ISBN 978-0-7294-1222-3
  - Liste et catalogue des écrivains in Volume 12 (2017) ISBN 978-0-7294-1147-9
  - Chapters 1–12 in Volume 13A (2015) ISBN 978-0-7294-0965-0
  - Chapters 13–24 in Volume 13B (2015) ISBN 978-0-7294-1156-1
  - Chapters 25–30 in Volume 13C (2016) ISBN 978-0-7294-1157-8
  - Chapters 31–39 in Volume 13D (2016) ISBN 978-0-7294-1155-4
