= Timoléon Cheminais de Montaigu =

French Jesuit pulpit orator

Timoléon Cheminais de Montaigu was a French Jesuit pulpit orator.

== Biography ==
He was born in Paris on 3 January 1652; he entered the Society of Jesus at fifteen.

After teaching rhetoric and the humanities at Orléans, Cheminais was assigned to the work of preaching. Bayle declares that "many regarded him as the equal of Bourdaloue", though others consider this exaggerated.

Before many years his health gave way. He was appointed court-preacher, but was unable to accept the honour, though Augustin de Backer asserts the contrary. His voice partly failing him, he devoted himself to the instruction of the people of the villages and country places.

He died on 15 September 1689.

== Writings ==
The sermons of Cheminais were edited by Bretonneau (4 volumes, 12 mo. Paris, 1690–91; 7th ed., Brussels, 1713). They were translated into German (Augsburg, 1739); Pressburg, 1788), Dutch (Rotterdam, 1724) and Italian (Venice, 1735).

He was also the author of a work called Sentiments de piété (Paris, 1691, 1693, 1700; Brussels, 1702). A later edition (Toulouse, 1706) contained the Sentiments of James II, King of Great Britain. This work was translated into German (Cologue, 1723; Vienna, 1786), Dutch, (Antwerp), and Italian (Milan, 1837).

His sermons were revised and edited by François de Paule Bretonneau.
