= François de Paule Bretonneau =

French preacher, librettist and new-Latin operas playwright

- Born: 31 October 1660; Tours
- Died: 22 May 1741 (aged 80); Paris
- Occupations: Preacher; Librettist; Playwright

François de Paule Bretonneau (31 October 1660 – 22 May 1741) was a French preacher, librettist and new-Latin operas playwright.

== Short biography ==
After he entered the novitiate 14 September 1675, Bretonneau became known as a preacher and for four years was an officer of the Professed House of the Jesuits of Paris. He revised and edited the sermons of his colleagues Bourdaloue, Cheminais and Giroust. Father La Rue called him Trium mortuorum suscitator magnificus. He also revised the Œuvres spirituelles by Valois and part of La Rue's Sermons. Justice must be done to each of the prefaces he put at the head of these editions. The Analyses he made of the Discours of which he was the editor are accurate, clear, precise and appropriate to give young Christian orators the idea of a well-coordinated plan and well filled by the chain of evidence. Bretonneau was himself a preacher. His Sermons, Panégyriques, Discours and Mystères, in 7 vol. in-12, published in 1743 by Isaac-Joseph Berruyer, breathe a Christian eloquence. The graces of action failed him, but he had all the other parts of the sacred orator. His virtues were in support of his sermons. From Bretonneau we still have Réflexions chrétiennes pour les jeunes gens qui entrent dans le monde, in-12.

Bretonneau authored Celse martyr, tragédie en musique (lost) as well as the libretto of the opera in one prologue and five acts David et Jonathas H.490 by Marc-Antoine Charpentier. He also wrote in Latin.

== Publications ==
- 1687: Celse martyr, tragédie en musique, Paris, Vve C. Thiboust et P. Esclassan.
- 1688: David et Jonathas, tragédie en musique, given in the theater of college Louis le Grand, 28 February, Paris, widow of Claude Thiboust, and Pierre Esclassan.
- Abrégé de la Vie de Jacques II, in-12. (Book taken from a text of his confessor)
- 1708: Réflexions chrétiennes pour les jeunes gens qui entrent dans le monde, Paris, in-12;
- 1746: Sermons, panégyriques et discours sur les Mystères, ibid., 7 vol. in-12.
