= Nicolas Cornet =

French Catholic theologian

Nicolas Cornet (Amiens, 1572 – Paris, 1663) was a French Catholic theologian.

== Life ==
He studied at the Jesuit college of Amiens, took the doctorate of theology at the University of Paris, 1626, and soon became president of the Collège de Navarre and syndic of the Sorbonne (faculty of theology). In this latter capacity he reported to the assembly of the Sorbonne, 1649, seven propositions, two taken from Antoine Arnauld's Fréquente Communion and five from the Augustinus of Jansenius.

In spite of strong opposition created by members of the faculty who, with Saint-Amour, appealed to Parliament and by Jansenists like De Bourseis in "Propositiones de gratiâ in Sorbonnæ facultate prope diem examinandæ, propositæ Cal. Junii 1649", and Arnauld in "Considérations sur l'entreprise faite par M. Cornet, syndic de la faculté, en l'assemblée de Juillet 1649", he succeeded in having the Assembly of the Clergy of 1650 denounce the five propositions of the Augustinus to Pope Innocent X, who condemned them, 31 May 1653.

Maligned by Jansenist writers like Hermant, Cornet was held in high esteem by Richelieu and Mazarin. His eulogy was pronounced by Bossuet. He left no writings, but is said to have collaborated with Richelieu on the Méthodes de controverse.
