= Oxford University Studies in the Enlightenment =

- Edited by: Theodore Besterman, Gregory S. Brown
- Language: English and French
- Discipline: Enlightenment or the eighteenth century
- Publisher: Voltaire Foundation
- Published: 1955
- No. of books: 550

Oxford University Studies in the Enlightenment is a monographic series which has been published since 1955. Originally edited by Theodore Besterman, the series now comprises more than 600 books - edited volumes and monographs, in either English or French - on diverse topics related to the Enlightenment or the eighteenth century. Successors to Besterman as editor have been Haydn Mason (1976 - 1998), Antony Strugnell (1998 - 2002), Jonathan Mallinson (2002 - 2015), and the current General Editor, Gregory S. Brown, who took up the post at the start of 2016.

== Name ==
Previously the series was called Studies on Voltaire and the Eighteenth Century (SVEC). In 2013, the name was changed to reflect the publication's global and interdisciplinary scope, which includes the Age of Enlightenment in the long Eighteenth Century and growing scholarly move to see the Enlightenment as a movement with worldwide impact and implications. Currently it is published by the Voltaire Foundation, an academic department in the Division of Humanities of the University of Oxford. Volumes prior to 1970 were published by the Institut et Musée Voltaire in Geneva. In September 2017, the Voltaire Foundation announced a partnership with Liverpool University Press, which will take on responsibility for printing, warehousing, marketing and distribution of the series in 2018.

== Topics ==
The series publishes one book per month. Topics include history, literature and comparative studies, cultural studies, philosophy, the history of the book, theatre, arts and visual studies, and gender studies. Several of its books have won awards, such as the Society for the History of Natural History's Thackray Medal for Jean-Jacques Rousseau and botany: the salutary science (Alexandra Cook), and the Prix Marianne Roland Michel for The Profession of sculpture in the Paris 'Académie' (Tomas Macsotay).

== Reviews ==
- Vercruysse, Jérôme (1972). "Review of Studies on Voltaire and the Eighteenth Century". Revue d'Histoire littéraire de la France. 72 (4): 721–723. JSTOR 40524441.
- Duranton, Henri (1973). "Review of Studies on Voltaire and the Eighteenth Century". Revue d'Histoire littéraire de la France. 73 (6): 1078–1080. JSTOR 40524710.
- Balcou, J. (1976). "Review of Studies on Voltaire and the Eighteenth Century". Revue d'Histoire littéraire de la France. 76 (6): 1009–1011. JSTOR 40525744.
- Balcou, Jean (1978). "Review of Studies on Voltaire and the Eighteenth Century". Revue d'Histoire littéraire de la France. 78 (4): 651–653. JSTOR 40526139.
- Barny, R. (1980). "Review of Studies on Voltaire and the Eighteenth Century". Revue d'Histoire littéraire de la France. 80 (2): 291–295. JSTOR 40526544.
- Bianco, J. F. (1994). "Review of Studies on Voltaire and the Eighteenth Century". Revue d'Histoire littéraire de la France. 94 (2): 310–312. JSTOR 40531752.
- Sonenscher, M. (7 January 2015). "Money and Political Economy in the Enlightenment". French Studies. 69 (1): 98. doi:10.1093/fs/knu256.
- Kirkley, L. (7 January 2015). "Intellectual Journeys: The Translation of Ideas in Enlightenment England, France and Ireland". French Studies. 69 (1): 97–98. doi:10.1093/fs/knu251. S2CID 160484927.
- Deininger, M. A. (2 May 2015). "Rumor, Diplomacy and War in Enlightenment Paris". French Studies. 69 (2): 250–251. doi:10.1093/fs/knv026.
- Class, M. (2 May 2015). "Medicine and Narration in the Eighteenth Century" (PDF). French Studies. 69 (2): 248–249. doi:10.1093/fs/knv055.
- Kleer, R. A. (13 May 2015). "Money and Political Economy in the Enlightenment". French History. 29 (2): 252–253. doi:10.1093/fh/crv021.
- Van Kley, Dale K. (June 2015). "Interpreting the Ancien Régime. By David Bien. Edited by Rafe Blaufarb, Michael S. Christofferson, and Darrin M. McMahon. Oxford University Studies in the Enlightenment. Edited by Jonathan Mallinson. Oxford: Voltaire Foundation, 2014. Pp. xiv+300. $110.00". The Journal of Modern History. 87 (2): 448–450. doi:10.1086/681912.
- Frith, Nicola (30 June 2015). "India and Europe in the Global Eighteenth Century". French Studies. 69 (3): 395.1–396. doi:10.1093/fs/knv084. S2CID 161571755.
- Galleron, Ioana (18 September 2015). "'La Bagatelle' (1718–1719): A Critical Edition of Justus Van Effen's Journal". French Studies. 69 (4): 527.1–528. doi:10.1093/fs/knv166. S2CID 162816488.
- Rapport, Mike (18 September 2015). "Experiencing the French Revolution". French Studies. 69 (4): 536–537. doi:10.1093/fs/knv217.
- Stammers, Tom (18 September 2015). "Delicious Decadence: The Rediscovery of French Eighteenth-Century Painting in the Nineteenth Century". French Studies. 69 (4): 537.2–538. doi:10.1093/fs/knv188. S2CID 192113022.
- Sonenscher, Michael (18 September 2015). "L'Expérience de la perte autour du moment 1800". French Studies. 69 (4): 537.1–537. doi:10.1093/fs/knv170.
- Turnovsky, Geoffrey (June 2016). "Maîtres de leurs ouvrages: L'édition à compte d'auteur à Paris au XVIIIe siècle. By Marie-Claude Felton. Oxford University Studies in the Enlightenment. Edited by Jonathan Mallinson. Oxford: Voltaire Foundation, 2014. Pp. xxii+305. £65.00". The Journal of Modern History. 88 (2): 454–456. doi:10.1086/686118.
- Paul, Helen Julia (11 May 2016). "Daniel Carey, ed., Money and Political Economy in the Enlightenment. Oxford University Studies in the Enlightenment (Oxford, UK: Voltaire Foundation, 2014), pp. xii + 256, £60". Journal of the History of Economic Thought. 38 (2): 235–236. doi:10.1017/S1053837216000110. ISBN 978-0-7294-1138-7. S2CID 156475480.
- Hanrahan, James (30 May 2016). "Droit et philosophie à la lumière de l'Encyclopédie. Par Luigi Delia". French Studies. 70 (3): 440–441. doi:10.1093/fs/knw145.
- Agin, R. S. (30 May 2016). "La Fabrique de la modernité scientifique: discours et récits du progrès sous l'Ancien Régime. Édité par Frédéric Charbonneau". French Studies. 70 (3): 442–443. doi:10.1093/fs/knw147.
