= Louis Bossuet =

French parlementaire (1663-1742)

Louis Bossuet (22 February 1663 – 15 January 1742) was a French parlementaire.

== Life ==
Bossuet was born in Dijon, Province of Burgundy in 1663, the son of Antoine Bossuet (1624–1699), the seigneur of Azu, The Cosnée, and Vatronville Bonval, and Renée Madeleine Gaureault Mount (1644–1689), daughter of René de Nicolas Gaureault Mount, Marquis de la Perriere and Catherine of Hautoy. Bossuet's brother was Jacques Bénigne Bossuet (1664–1743), abbot of Savigny, and he was nephew by his father to another Jacques-Bénigne Bossuet, the Bishop of Meaux and godson of Louis de Bourbon, Prince of Condé. On 22 February 1700 Bossuet married Marguerite of Labriffe, daughter of Arnaud Labriffe II, Marquis de Ferrières-en-Brie, the Paris prosecutor in parliament, and Martha Agnes Potter Novion, in the chapel of the hotel Labriffe on rue Barbette, Paris. The marriage contract was drawn up at Versailles in front of M. Robillart and signed by Louis XIV and all of the princes and princesses of the line.

Bossuet died in Paris in 1742.

== Politics ==
Bossuet was advisor to the parliament of Metz (1685) and master of petitions in the parliament of Paris (1696).

== Portrait ==
Louis Bossuet was painted by the French baroque painter Hyacinthe Rigaud in 1698, and the portrait was sold for £140. Its current whereabouts are unknown.

== Bibliography ==
- Jacques-Régis du Cray, Le sang de l’Aigle de Meaux (histoire et descendance des frères et sœurs de Bossuet), preface by Bernard Barbiche, Suresnes, 2004, pp. 25–6.
