= Politics Drawn from the Very Words of Holy Scripture =

French political theory book

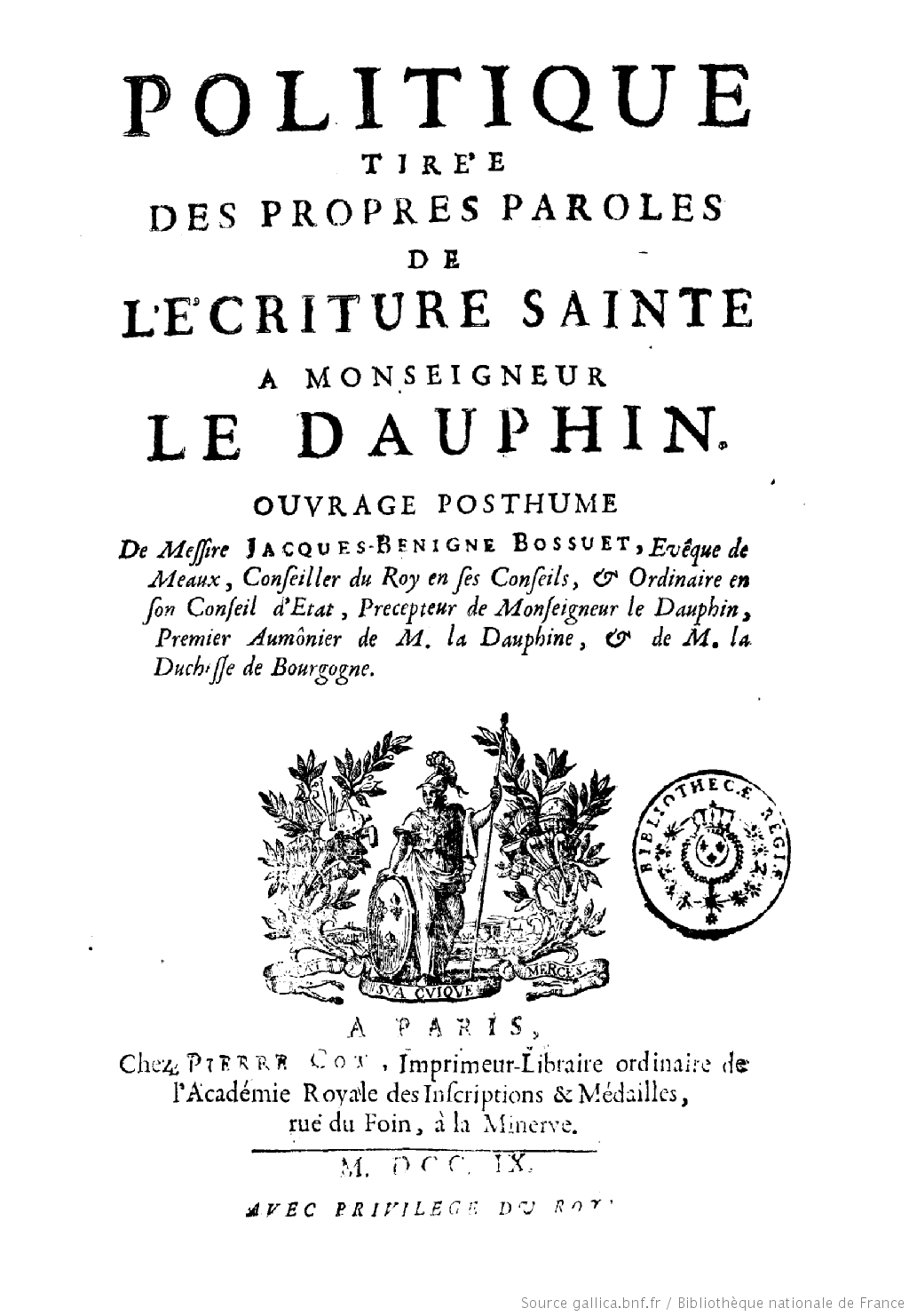
Title page of the 1709 version of Politics Drawn from the Very Words of Holy Scripture in French.

Politique tirée des propres paroles de l'Écriture sainte (English Politics Drawn from the Very Words of Holy Scripture) is a work of political theory composed by Jacques-Bénigne Bossuet as part of his duties as tutor for Louis XIV's heir apparent, Louis, le Grand Dauphin. It is one of the purest expressions of the branch of political absolutism which political scientists have labeled the divine right of kings.

The book was initially composed in 1679, but it was first published in 1709. Bossuet had died in 1704, and the book was published posthumously. The book is incomplete. Bossuet's role as a tutor ended in 1679 or 1680 and he had no reason to continue working on the education of Louis. He resumed working on the incomplete book in 1700, but died before completing the task.

== Context ==
On 30 September 1670, Bossuet was named tutor to Louis XIV's only son, the 9-year old Louis. Bossuet was responsible for the youth's religious, philosophical, and political upbringing for the next eleven years.

In this role, Bossuet produced a number of works designed to instruct the (presumed) future King of France on his role. These works included: the Traité de la connaissance de Dieu et de soi-même (1677), a religious work; the Discours sur l'histoire universelle (1679, published 1682), a historical survey designed to furnish his pupil with useful lessons drawn from the past; and the first six books of Politique tirée de l'Ecriture Sainte (1679, published 1709), a book dedicated entirely to the source and proper exercise of political power.

In 1679, Bossuet set aside the book, leaving it unfinished, though not before describing the work in a long letter addressed to Pope Innocent XI.

His tutorship came to an end in 1679–80, leaving the work unfinished. Twenty years later, in 1700, he resumed work on the Politique. At the time of his death, in Spring 1704, he had completed Books VII through X of the work.

After his death, his nephew, the Abbé de Bossuet, completed the work, inserting a fragment from St. Augustine's City of God. Political and theological disputes resulted in some changes to the work, but it was finally published in 1709.

== Sources ==
Unlike most of his contemporaries, in this work, Bossuet has only minimal recourse to classical sources. Rather, the work is drawn almost entirely from the Bible (including the Deuterocanonical Books which are recognized as scripture by the Roman Catholic Church), especially the books of the Old Testament. In this way Bossuet presents his system as founded almost entirely on divine law. The bible which he uses is the Vulgate, and English Translations use the Douay-Rheims. This causes discrepancies in numbering with contemporary bibles.

== Contents ==
The table of contents gives a good indication of the nature of the book's argument:

=== First Book – Of the principles of human society ===
First Article. Man is made to live in society.
Second Article. The society of mankind gives birth to civil society, that is to say, to states, peoples, and nations.
Third Article. To form nations and unite the people, it is necessary to have a government.
Fourth Article. On laws and politics
Fifth Article. Consequences of the general principles of humanity.
Sixth Article. On the love of country.

=== Second Book – On authority: that the royal and hereditary is the most proper for government ===
First Article. By whom authority has been exercised since the beginning of the world.
Second Article. On the right of conquest, which is rendered incontestable by peaceable possession.

=== Third Book – Beginning to explain the nature and the properties of royal authority ===
First Article. Noting its essential characteristics.
Second Article. Royal authority is sacred.
Third Article. Royal authority is paternal, and its proper character is goodness.

=== Fourth Book – On the characteristics of royalty (continuation) ===
First Article. Royal authority is absolute.
Second Article. On softness, irresolution and false firmness.

=== Fifth Book – Fourth and final characteristic of royal authority ===
First Article. Royal authority is subject to reason.
Second Article. Means by which the prince can acquire necessary knowledge.
Third Article. On dangerous curiosities and kinds of knowledge: and on the confidence one must place in God.
Fourth Article. Consequences of the preceding doctrine: on majesty and its concomitants.

=== Sixth Book – The duties of subjects toward the prince, based on the preceding doctrine ===
First Article. On the service one owes to the king.
Second article. On the obedience due to the prince.
Third Article. Two difficulties drawn from Scripture: David and the Maccabees.

=== Seventh Book – On the particular duties of royalty ===
First Article. General division of the prince's duties.
Second Article. On religion, inasmuch as it is the good of nations, and of civil society.
Third Article. That the true religion is known through perceptible marks.
Fourth Article. Errors of men of the world and statesmen concerning the affairs and practices of religion.
Fifth Article. What care great kings have taken for the worship of God.
Sixth Article. Religious motives peculiar to kings.

=== Eighth Book – The particular duties of royalty, continued: of justice ===
First Article. That justice is founded on religion.
Second Article. On government which is called arbitrary.
Third Article. On legislation and on judgments.
Fourth Article. On the virtues which must accompany justice.
Fifth Article. Obstacles to justice.

=== Ninth Book – The supports of royalty: arms, riches or finances, and counsels ===
First Article. On war and its just motives, general and particular.
Second Article. On unjust motives for war.
Third Article. On wars between citizens, together with their motives, and the rules which must be followed.
Fourth Article. Though God made war for his people in an extraordinary and miraculous fashion, he wanted to harden them by giving them warlike kings and great captains.
Fifth Article. On military virtues, institutions, orders, and exercises.
Sixth article. On peace and war: various observations on both of them.

=== Tenth Book – Continuing supports of royalty: Riches or finances; Counsel; the inconveniences and temptations which accompany royalty: and the remedies to bring to them ===
First Article. On riches or on finances. On commerce, and on taxes.
Second Article. On counsel.
Third Article. The prince is reminded of different characters of ministers or counselors: good, mixture of good and bad, and wicked.
Fourth Article. To help the prince to know men well, one shows him, in a general way, some characters drawn by the Holy Spirit in the Book of Wisdom.
Fifth Article. On the conduct of the prince in his family, and on the care he must have for his health.
Sixth Article. The disadvantages and temptations which accompany royalty and the remedies that one can bring to them.

=== Conclusion ===
In what the true happiness of kings consists. The prince is not regarded as a private person; he is a public personage, all the state is in him, the will of all the people is included in his.
