= Charles de la Rue =

French poet and Jesuit (1643–1725)

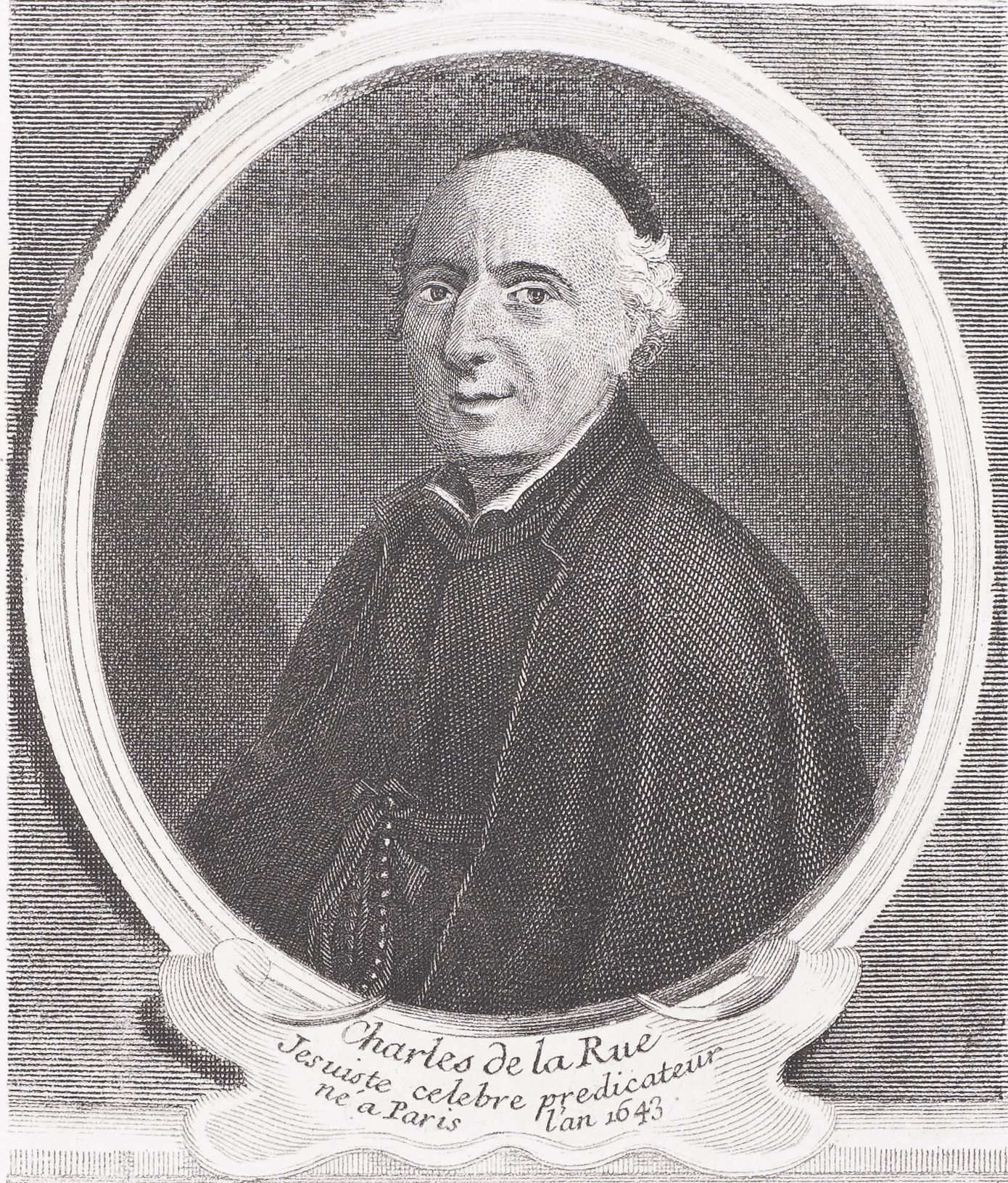
Charles de la Rue

Charles de La Rue (3 August 1643, in Paris – 27 May 1725, in Paris), known in Latin as Carolus Ruaeus, was one of the great orators of the Society of Jesus in France in the seventeenth century.

== Biography ==
He entered the novitiate on 7 September 1659, and being afterwards professor of the humanities and rhetoric, he attracted attention while still young by a poem on the victories of Louis XIV. Pierre Corneille translated it and offered it to the king, saying that his work did not equal the original of the young Jesuit.

After having several times refused to permit him to go to Canada, his superiors assigned him to preaching; as an orator he was much admired by the court and the king.

He preached missions among the Protestants of Languedoc for three years. During his last years he suffered from severe illness.

== Publications ==
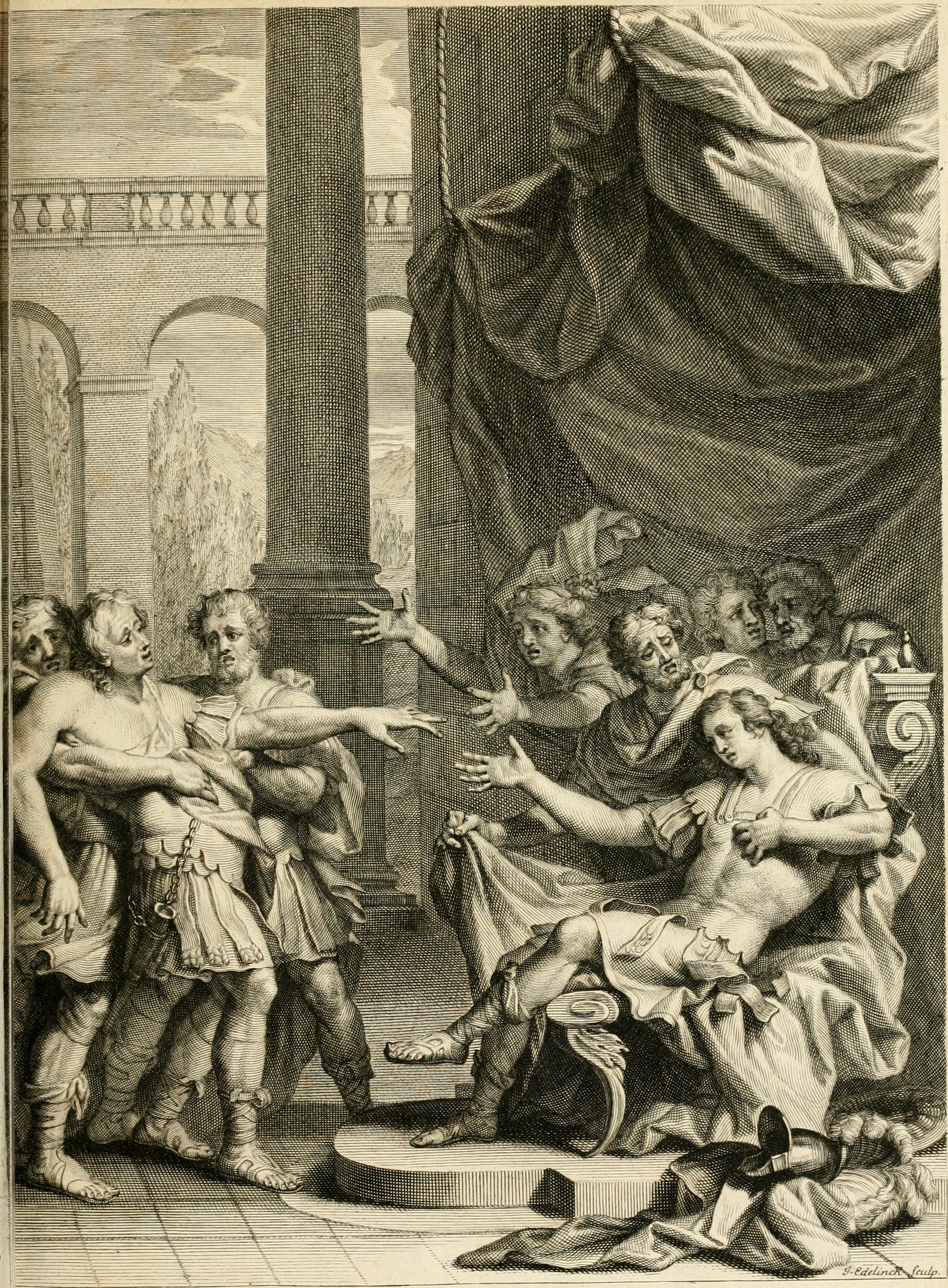
Title page of Caroli Ruaei e Societate Jesu Carminum libri quatuor (1680).

He wrote several tragedies, published an edition of Virgil, and wrote several Latin poems. His funeral orations on the Dukes of Burgundy and Luxemburg, and that on Jacques-Bénigne Bossuet, his sermons on "Les Calamités publiques" and "The Dying Sinner" have been regarded as masterpieces by the greatest masters.

- Panégyriques, Oraisons funèbres et Sermons de morale; Paris 1719, in-8°; Lyon, in-12;
- A Carême and an Avent; 4 vol. in-12;
- Lettre; (Écrit destiné à défendre ce qu’il avait avancé en prêchant à Alençon en 1680; elle a été insérée par l’abbé Tilladet dans ses Dissertations sur diverses matières de religion et de philologie; vol. I)
- Panégyriques des saints et Oraisons funèbres; Paris, 1740, 3 vol.

== See also ==
- François de Paule Bretonneau
