= Complete Works of Voltaire =

1968 critical edition of the works of Voltaire

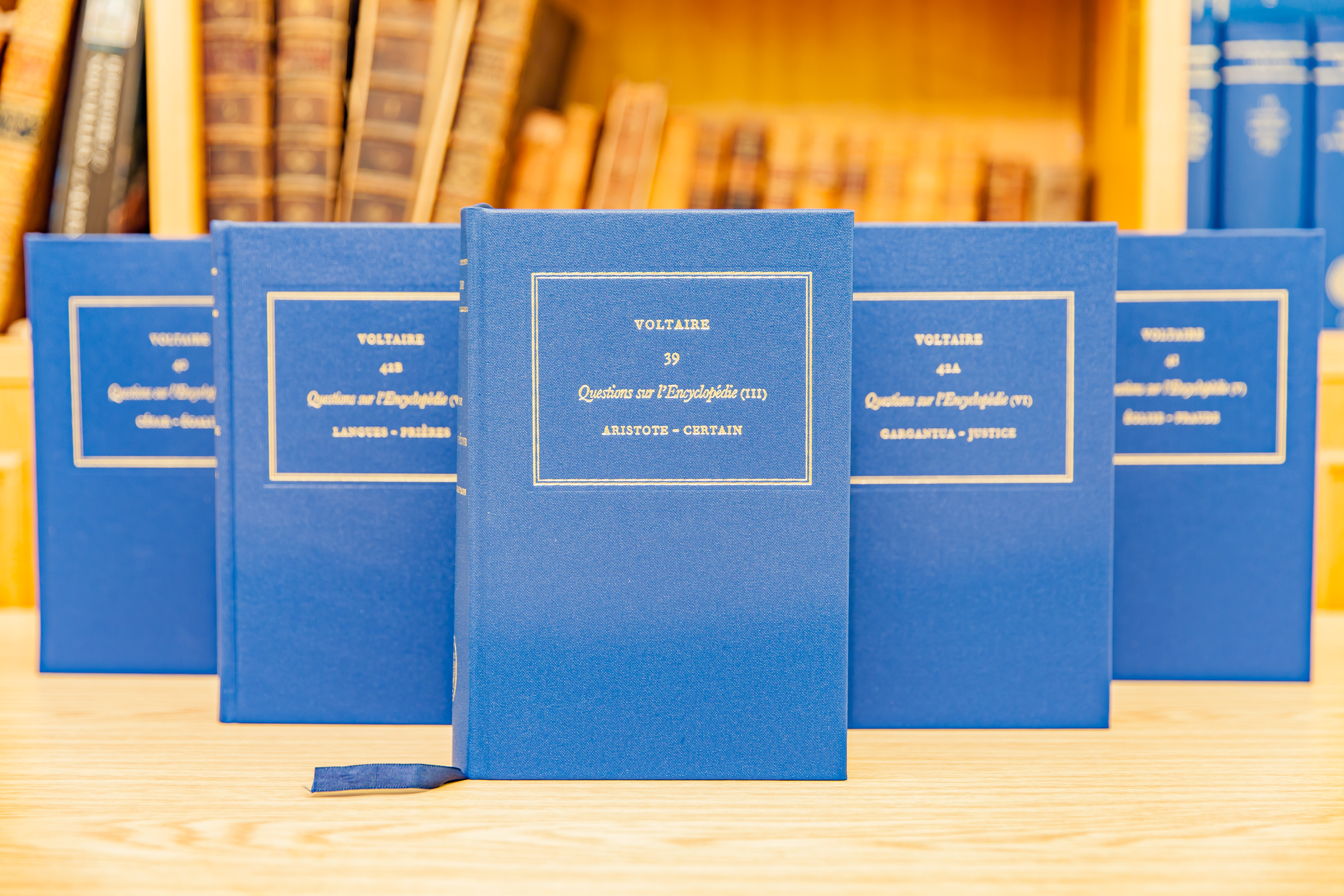

The Complete Works of Voltaire (Œuvres complètes de Voltaire) is the first critical edition of the totality of Voltaire's writings (in the original French) arranged chronologically. The project was started by the bibliographer and translator Theodore Besterman who only lived to see the first two volumes published. It is currently published by the Voltaire Foundation at the University of Oxford.

Each text is given an introduction, variants and detailed annotations. The first volume was published in 1968, with the 205th and final volume appearing in April 2022.

== Reviews ==
- Todd, Christopher (1972). "Review of Les Œuvres complètes de Voltaire (The Complete Works of Voltaire)". The Modern Language Review. 67 (4): 895–913. doi:10.2307/3724528. JSTOR 3724528.
- Todd, Christopher (1974). "Review of Les Œuvres complètes de Voltaire (The Complete Works of Voltaire). Volumes 99-105. Correspondence and Related Documents: XV-XXI (March 1754-July 1760)". The Modern Language Review. 69 (2): 407–412. doi:10.2307/3724613. JSTOR 3724613.
- Braun, Theodore E. D. (1990). "Review of Complete Works of Voltaire/Œuvres complètes de Voltaire. Volume VIII: La Mort de César, Ulla Kölving; Zaïre; Poésies". The Modern Language Review. 85 (4): 957–958. doi:10.2307/3732702. JSTOR 3732702.
- Williams, David (1993). "Review of The Complete Works of Voltaire (Les Œuvres complètes de Voltaire) Vol. LXIII A: 1767". The Modern Language Review. 88 (2): 473–474. doi:10.2307/3733833. JSTOR 3733833.
- Todd, Christopher (1995). "Review of The Complete Works of Voltaire/Œuvres complètes de Voltaire. Vol. XXIA: Rome sauvée, ou Catilina, Ulla Kölving; Oreste; Dissertations sur les principales tragédies anciennes et modernes qui ont paru sur le sujet d'Electre et en particulier sur celle de Sophocles, David H. Jory". The Modern Language Review. 90 (1): 195–196. doi:10.2307/3733321. JSTOR 3733321.
- James, E. D. (1995). "Review of The Complete Works of Voltaire/Œuvres Complètes de Voltaire. Vol. XV: Eléments de la philosophie de Newton, Ulla Kölving". The Modern Language Review. 90 (4): 1005–1006. doi:10.2307/3733103. JSTOR 3733103.
- Goulbourne, Russell (2001). "Review of The Complete Works of Voltaire / Œuvres complètes de Voltaire. Vol. IX: 1732-1733". The Modern Language Review. 96 (2): 501–502. doi:10.2307/3737397. JSTOR 3737397.
- Dunkley, John (2005). "Review of The Complete Works of Voltaire/Œuvres complètes de Voltaire. Vol. III:C: Hérode et Mariamne". The Modern Language Review. 100 (4): 1115–1116. JSTOR 3737760.
- James, Edward (2007). "Œuvres complètes de Voltaire, 71A. Voltaire éditeur. Œuvres de 1769–1770 (I) Œuvres complètes de Voltaire, 71B. Voltaire éditeur. Œuvres de 1769–1770 (II)". French Studies. 61 (4): 515–516. doi:10.1093/fs/knm212. ISSN 0016-1128.
- Pierse, Síofra (2012-07-01). "Les Œuvres complètes de Voltaire, 75B: Fragments sur l'Inde et sur le général Lalli". French Studies. 66 (3): 398–399. doi:10.1093/fs/kns126. ISSN 0016-1128.
- Fredericks, Kathryn E. (2012). "Review of Œuvres complètes de Voltaire 143 Corpus des notes marginales 8". Dalhousie French Studies. 100: 126–128. JSTOR 43488357.
- Tsien, Jennifer (2014-03-01). "Les Œuvres complètes de Voltaire, vol. 45A: Œuvres de 1753-57 / Writings of 1753-57. Edited by BASIL GUY et al. Oxford: PB - Voltaire Foundation. 2009. xxii + 456 p. £99. (hb). ISBN 978-0-7294-0942-1". Journal for Eighteenth-Century Studies. 37 (1): 123–124. doi:10.1111/1754-0208.12062. ISSN 1754-0208.

== See also ==
- List of works by Voltaire
