= Louis Bourdaloue =

French Jesuit and preacher (1632–1704)

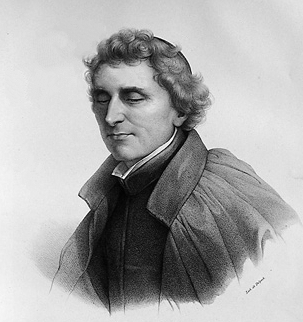
- Born: 20 August 1632
- Died: 13 May 1704 (aged 71)

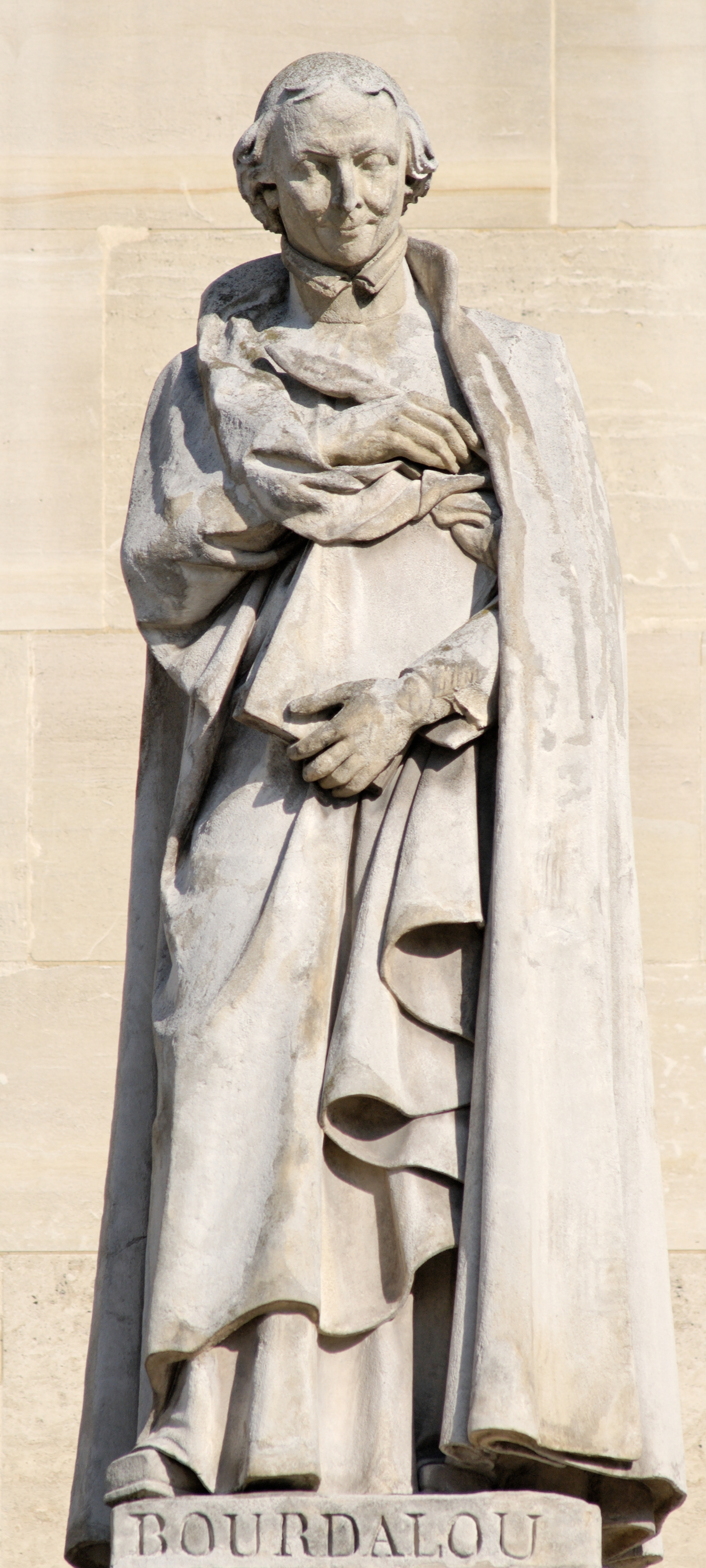
Bourdaloue by Louis Desprez, Cour Napoléon of the Palais du Louvre

Louis Bourdaloue (20 August 1632 – 13 May 1704) was a French Jesuit and preacher.

== Biography ==
Louis Bourdaloue was born in Bourges where his father practiced law. He began his studies at the Jesuit Collège de Sainte-Marie in Bourges. In November 1648 he entered the Society of Jesus, and was appointed successively professor of rhetoric, philosophy and moral theology, in various Jesuit colleges. His success as a preacher in the provinces led his superiors to call him to Paris in 1669 to occupy for a year the pulpit of the church of St. Louis. (Note: Now called Eglise St.-Paul-St-Louis, Metro St. Paul. To the left as one enters the church there is a large plaque dedicated to Bourdaloue on a pillar in front of the church.) He was friends with Jacques-Benigne Bossuet, although they had very different styles and approaches to preaching.

He preached at the court of Versailles during the Advent of 1670 and the Lent of 1672, and was subsequently called again to deliver the Lenten course of sermons in 1674, 1675, 1680 and 1682, and the Advent sermons of 1684, 1689 and 1693. This was all the more noteworthy as it was the custom never to call the same preacher more than three times to court. Bourdaloue earned a reputation as an outstanding preacher.

Places were secured at daybreak; princes and prelates crowded to hear him, and on one memorable occasion, several of the most distinguished members of the hierarchy, among them Bossuet himself, withdrew in anger because the seats they claimed were not granted. Bossuet himself, however, remained in a gallery apart to listen to the discourse. Madame de Sévigné was a great admirer.

On the Revocation of the Edict of Nantes he was sent to Languedoc to confirm the new converts in the Catholic faith, possibly at the request of Anne-Jules, 2nd Duke of Noailles. He had much success in this delicate mission. Catholics and Protestants came in throngs to hear him, and were unanimous in praising his fiery eloquence in the Lent sermons which he preached at Montpellier in 1686.

His strength lay in his power of adapting himself to audiences of every kind. His influence was reportedly due as much to his character and his manners as to the force of his reasoning. Voltaire said that his sermons surpassed those of Jacques-Bénigne Bossuet (whose retirement in 1669, however, practically coincided with Bourdaloue's early pulpit utterances), and it is said that their simplicity and coherence as well as the direct appeal that they made to hearers of all classes gave them a superiority over the more profound sermons of Bossuet.

Bourdaloue generally addressed issues of morality in daily life and his experience as a confessor gave him insight into people wrestling with ethical issues. Many of his sermons were adopted as textbooks in schools.

Towards the close of his life he confined his ministry to charitable institutions, hospitals and prisons. He died in Paris on 13 May 1704 at the age of seventy-one.

His sermons were revised and edited by François de Paule Bretonneau. Eight of his sermons were translated and published as Eight Sermons for Holy Week and Easter by George Francis Crowther in 1884.

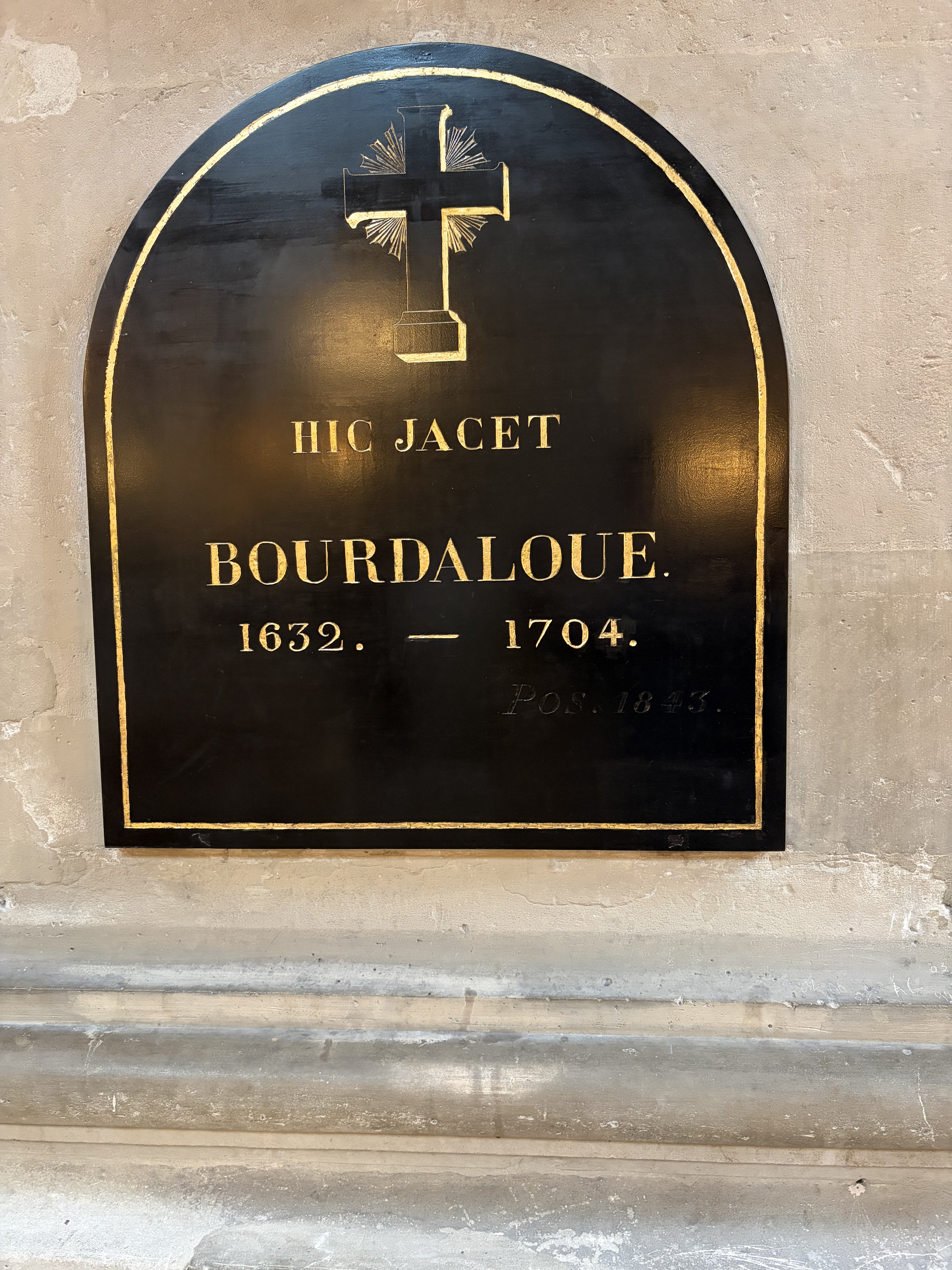
Tomb of Louis Bourdaloue, Église Saint-Paul-Saint-Louis, Paris
