= Jacques-Bénigne Bossuet =

French bishop and theologian (1627–1704)

His Grace Jacques-Bénigne Bossuet
- Bishop of Meaux
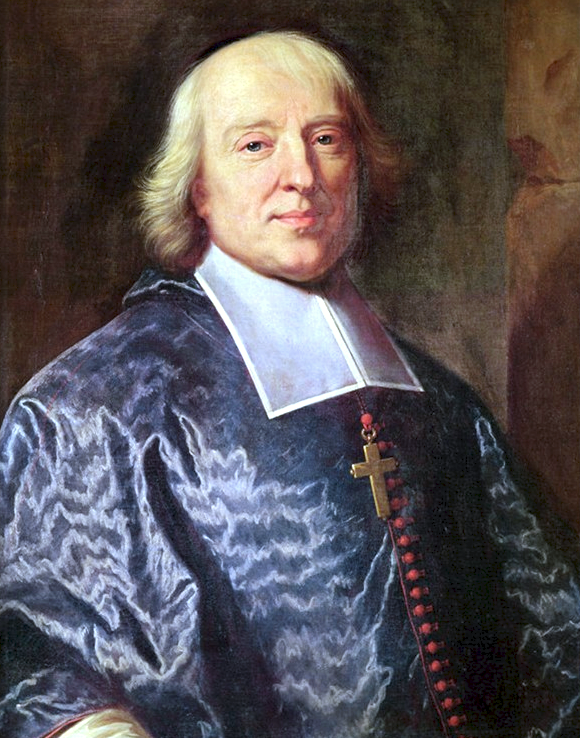
- Portrait of Jacques-Bénigne Bossuet by Hyacinthe Rigaud
- Church: Roman Catholic Church
- Diocese: Meaux
- See: Cathedral of Saint Stephen
- Installed: 17 November 1681
- Term ended: 12 April 1704
- Predecessor: Dominique de Ligny
- Successor: Henri-Pons de Thiard de Bissy

Personal details
- Born: 27 September 1627 Dijon, France
- Died: 12 April 1704 (aged 76) Paris, France
- Occupation: Bishop, writer, tutor
- Education: College of Navarre, Paris

Jacques-Bénigne Lignel Bossuet (French: [bɔsɥɛ]; 27 September 1627 – 12 April 1704) was a French Catholic prelate and theologian who served as Bishop of Meaux from 1681 until his death in 1704. Renowned for his sermons, addresses and literary works, he is regarded as a brilliant orator and literary stylist of the French language.

A native of Dijon, Bossuet was educated at a Jesuit school before enrolling in the College of Navarre in Paris, where he studied philosophy and theology. In 1652, he was ordained a priest and became a Doctor of Divinity. He spent the next seven years at Metz, where he honed his skills in oratory and politics, before returning to Paris and establishing his reputation as a great preacher. By the early 1660s, Bossuet was preaching regularly before the court of King Louis XIV at Versailles. He was appointed tutor to the Dauphin in 1670 and elected to the Académie Française a year later.

In 1681, he was appointed Bishop of Meaux, a position he held until his death. Bossuet was a strong advocate of political absolutism and the divine right of kings. Later in his life, he was also involved in the controversies over Gallicanism and Quietism, and supported the king's revocation of the Edict of Nantes, which abolished the rights of the Huguenot Protestant minority. Bossuet died in 1704 at the age of 76.

The works of Bossuet best known to English speakers are three great orations delivered at the funerals of Queen Henrietta Maria, widow of Charles I of England (1669); of her daughter Henriette, Duchess of Orléans (1670) and of the outstanding military commander Le Grand Condé (1687). He published his Discours sur l'histoire universelle (Discourse on Universal History) in 1681.

== Biography ==
=== Early years ===
Bossuet was born at Dijon. He came from a family of prosperous Burgundian lawyers – on both his paternal and maternal sides, his ancestors had held legal posts for at least a century. He was the fifth son born to Beneigne Bossuet, a judge of the parlement (a provincial high court) at Dijon, and Marguerite Mouchet. His parents decided on a career in the Church for their fifth son, so he was tonsured at age eight.

The boy was sent to school at the Collège des Godrans, a classical school run by the Jesuits of Dijon. When his father was appointed to the parlement at Metz, Bossuet was left in Dijon under the care of his uncle Claude Bossuet d'Aiseray, a renowned scholar. At the Collège des Godrans, he gained a reputation for hard work: fellow students nicknamed him Bos suetus aratro, an "ox accustomed to the plough". His father's influence at Metz allowed him to obtain for the young Bossuet a canonry in the cathedral of Metz when the boy was just 13 years old.

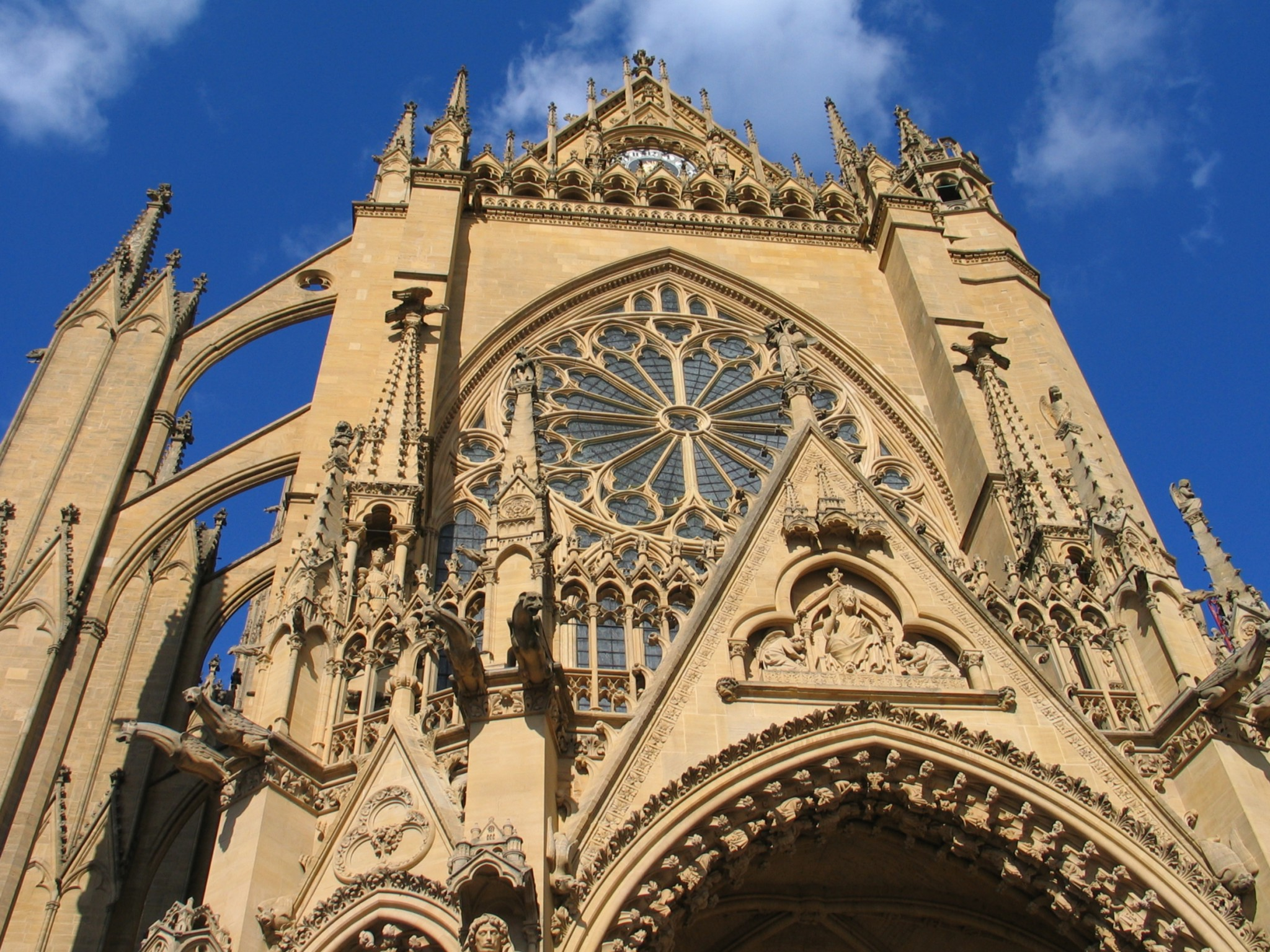
St. Etienne's Cathedral in Metz, where Bossuet was made a canon at age 13 in 1640.

In 1642, Bossuet enrolled in the Collège de Navarre in Paris to finish his classical studies and to begin the study of philosophy and theology. His mentor there was the college's president, Nicolas Cornet, the theologian whose denunciation of Antoine Arnauld at the Sorbonne in 1649 was a major episode in the Jansenist controversy.

For the time being, however, Cornet and Arnaud were still on good terms. In 1643, Arnaud introduced Bossuet to the Hôtel de Rambouillet, a great centre of aristocratic culture and the original home of the Précieuses. Bossuet was already showing signs of the oratorical brilliance which served him so well throughout his life. On one celebrated occasion at the Hôtel de Rambouillet, during a dispute about extempore preaching, the 16-year-old Bossuet was called on to deliver an impromptu sermon at 11 pm. Vincent Voiture famously quipped: "I never heard anybody preach so early nor so late."

=== Early clerical career ===
Bossuet became a Master of Arts in 1643. He sustained his first thesis (tentativa) in theology on 25 January 1648, in the presence of the Prince de Condé. Later in 1648, he was ordained a subdeacon by Sébastien Zamet, Bishop of Langres. His ordination as a deacon came in 1649, after which he began to preach his first sermons.

He sustained his second thesis (sorbonica) on 9 November 1650. Then, in preparation for the priesthood, he spent the next two years on retreat under the spiritual direction of Saint Vincent de Paul at Saint Lazare in Paris.

=== Priest at Metz ===
In January 1652, Bossuet returned to public life, being named Archdeacon of Sarrebourg. He was ordained a priest on 18 March 1652. A few weeks later, he defended his brilliant doctoral work and became a Doctor of Divinity.

He spent the next seven years at Metz, where he now had the office of archdeacon. He was plunged at once into the thick of controversy; nearly half of Metz was Protestant, and Bossuet's first appearance in print was a refutation of the Huguenot pastor Paul Ferry (1655). During the rest of his time at Metz he frequently engaged in religious controversies with Protestants (and, less regularly, with Jews). Reconciling the Protestants with the Catholic Church became his dream, and for this purpose, he began to train himself carefully for the pulpit, an all-important centre of influence in a land where political assemblies were unknown and novels and newspapers scarcely born. His youthful imagination was unbridled, and his ideas ran easily into a kind of paradoxical subtlety, redolent of divinity faculties. Nevertheless, his time at Metz was an important time for developing his pulpit oratory and for allowing him to continue his study of Scripture and the Church Fathers. He also gained political experience through his participation in the local Assembly of the Three Orders.

In 1657, in Metz, Bossuet preached before Anne of Austria, mother of Louis XIV. As a result, he received the honorific title of "Counselor and Preacher to the King".

=== Early career in Paris ===
In 1657, St. Vincent de Paul convinced Bossuet to move to Paris and give himself entirely to preaching. (He did not entirely sever his connections with the cathedral of Metz, though: he continued to hold his benefice, and in 1664, when his widowed father was ordained as a priest and became a canon of the Metz cathedral chapter, Bossuet was named chapter's dean.)

Bossuet quickly gained a reputation as a great preacher, and by 1660, he was preaching regularly before the court in the Chapel Royal. In 1662, he preached his famous sermon "On the Duties of Kings" to Louis XIV at the Louvre.

In Paris, the congregations had no mercy on purely clerical logic or clerical taste; if a preacher wished to catch their ear, he had to manage to address them in terms they would agree to consider sensible and well-bred. Having very stern ideas of the dignity of a priest, Bossuet refused to descend to the usual devices for arousing popular interest.

The narrative element in Bossuet's sermons grew shorter with each year. He never drew satirical pictures like his great rival Louis Bourdaloue. He would not write out his discourses in full, much less learn them off by heart: of the two hundred printed in his works, all but a fraction are rough drafts. Ladies such as Mme de Sévigné forsook him when Bourdaloue dawned on the Paris horizon in 1669, though Fénelon and La Bruyère, two much sounder critics, refused to follow their example.

Bossuet possessed the full equipment of the orator: voice, language, flexibility, and strength. He never needed to strain for effect; his genius struck out at a single blow the thought, the feeling, and the word. What he said of Martin Luther applied peculiarly to himself: he could fling his fury into theses and thus unite the dry light of argument with the fire and heat of passion. These qualities reached their highest point in the Oraisons funèbres (Funeral Orations).

Bossuet was always best when at work on a large canvas; besides, here no conscientious scruples intervened to prevent him from giving much time and thought to the artistic side of his subject. The Oraison, as its name betokened, stood midway between the sermon proper and what would nowadays be called a biographical sketch. At least that was what Bossuet made it; for on this field, he stood not merely first, but alone.

137 of Bossuet's sermons preached in the period from 1659 to 1669 are extant, and it is estimated that he preached more than a hundred more that have since been lost. Apart from state occasions, Bossuet seldom appeared in a Paris pulpit after 1669.

=== Tutor to the Dauphin, 1670–1681 ===
A favourite of the court, in 1669 Bossuet was gazetted bishop of Condom in Gascony without being obliged to reside there. He was consecrated bishop on 21 September 1670, but he resigned the see when he was elected to the Académie française in 1671.

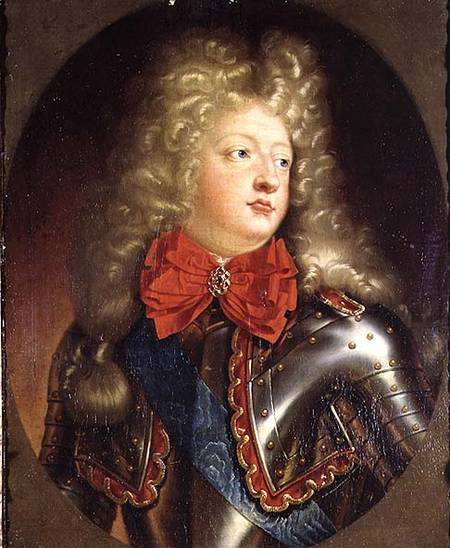
The Grand Dauphin (1661–1711), only surviving legitimate son of Louis XIV (1638–1715). Bossuet served as his tutor 1670–1681.

On 18 September 1670 he was appointed tutor to the nine-year-old Dauphin, eldest child of Louis XIV. The choice was scarcely fortunate. Bossuet unbent as far as he could, but his genius was by no means fitted to enter into the feelings of a child; and the dauphin was a choleric, ungainly, sullen boy. Probably no one was happier than the tutor when his charge turned sixteen and was married off to a Bavarian princess. Still, Bossuet's nine years at court were by no means wasted.

Bossuet's tutorial functions involved composing all the necessary books of instruction, including not just handwriting samples, but also manuals of philosophy, history, and religion fit for a future King of France. Among the books written by Bossuet during this period are three classics. First came the Traité de la connaissance de Dieu et de soi-même ("Treatise on the Knowledge of God and of Oneself") (1677), then the Discours sur l'histoire universelle ("Discourse on Universal History") (1679, published 1682), and lastly the Politique tirée de l'Écriture Sainte ("Politics Drawn from Holy Scripture") (1679, published 1709). The three books fit into each other. The Traité is a general sketch of the nature of God and the nature of man. The Discours is a history of God's dealings with humanity in the past. The Politique is a code of rights and duties drawn up in the light thrown by those dealings. Bossuet's conclusions are only drawn from Holy Scripture because he wished to gain the highest possible sanction for the institutions of his country and to hallow the France of Louis XIV by proving its astonishing likeness to the Israel of Solomon. Then, too, the veil of Holy Scripture enabled him to speak out more boldly than court etiquette would have otherwise allowed, to remind the son of Louis XIV that kings have duties as well as rights.

The Grand Dauphin had often forgotten these duties, but his son, the Petit Dauphin, would bear them in mind. The tutor's imagination looked forward to a time when France would blossom into Utopia, with a Christian philosopher on the throne. That is what made him so stalwart a champion of authority in all its forms: "le roi, Jesus-Christ et l'Eglise, Dieu en ces trois noms" ("the king, Jesus Christ, and the Church, God in His three names"), he says in a characteristic letter. The object of his books was to provide authority with a rational basis. Bossuet's worship of authority by no means killed his confidence in reason – what it did was make him doubt the honesty of those who reasoned otherwise than himself.

The whole chain of argument seemed to him so clear and simple. Philosophy proves that God exists and that He shapes and governs the course of human affairs. History shows that this governance is, for the most part, indirect, exercised through certain venerable corporations, as well civil and ecclesiastical, all of which demand implicit obedience as the immediate representatives of God. Thus all revolt, whether civil or religious, is a direct defiance of the Almighty.

Oliver Cromwell becomes a moral monster, and the revocation of the Edict of Nantes the greatest achievement of the second Constantine. The France of Bossuet's youth had known the misery of divided counsels and civil war; the France of his adulthood, brought together under an absolute sovereign, had suddenly burgeoned into a splendour comparable only with ancient Rome. Why not, then, strain every sinew to hold innovation at bay and so prolong that splendour for all time? Bossuet's own Discours sur l'histoire universelle might have furnished an answer, for there the fall of many empires is detailed; but then the Discours was composed with a single purpose in mind.

To Bossuet, the establishment of Christianity was the one point of real importance in the whole history of the world. He totally ignores the history of Islam and Asia; on Greece and Rome, he only touched insofar as they formed part of the Praeparatio Evangelica. Yet his Discours is far more than a theological pamphlet. While Pascal might refer to the rise and fall of empires to Providence or chance or a little grain of sand in Cromwell's veins, Bossuet held fast to his principle that God works through secondary causes. It is the divine will that every great change should have its roots in the ages that went before it. Bossuet, accordingly, made a heroic attempt to grapple with origins and causes, and in this way, his book deserves its place as one of the first philosophical histories.

=== Bishop of Meaux, 1681–1704 ===
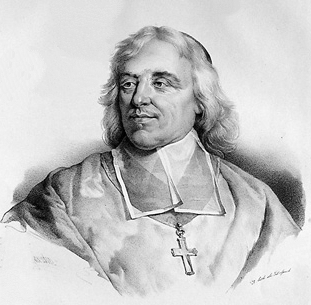
Bishop Bossuet

With the period of the Dauphin's formal education ending in 1681, Bossuet was appointed Bishop of Meaux by the King on 2 May 1681, an appointment approved by Pope Innocent XI on 17 November. But before he could take possession of his see, he was drawn into a violent quarrel between Louis XIV and Pope Innocent XI. Here he found himself in a quandary. To support the Pope meant supporting the Jesuits, and he, almost as much as Pascal, hated the Jesuits' supposed casuistry and dévotion aisée. However, to oppose the Pope was to play into the hands of Louis XIV, who was eager to subject the Church to the will of the State. Therefore, Bossuet attempted to steer a middle course. In 1682, before the General Assembly of the French Clergy, he preached a great sermon on the unity of the Church and made it a magnificent plea for compromise. As Louis XIV insisted on his clergy making an anti-papal declaration, Bossuet got leave to draw it up and made it as moderate as he could, and when the Pope declared it null and void, he set to work on a gigantic Defensio Cleri Gallicani, only published after his death. Throughout this controversy, unlike the court bishops, Bossuet constantly resided in his diocese and took an active interest in governing it.

==== Efforts to combat Protestantism ====
The Gallican storm a little abated, he turned back to a project very dear to his heart. Ever since the early days at Metz, he had been busy with schemes for uniting the Huguenots to the Catholic Church. In 1668, he converted Turenne; in 1670, he published an Exposition de la foi catholique ("Exposition of the Catholic Faith"), so moderate in tone that adversaries were driven to accuse him of having fraudulently watered down the Catholic dogmas to suit Protestant taste.

Finally, in 1688, his great Histoire des variations des Églises protestantes ("History of the Variations of the Protestant Churches"), perhaps the most brilliant of all his works, appeared. Few writers could have made the Justification controversy interesting or even intelligible. His argument is simple enough. Without rules, an organised society cannot hold together, and rules require an authorised interpreter. The Protestant churches had thrown over this interpreter; and Bossuet had small trouble in showing that, the longer they lived, the more they varied on increasingly important points.

The Protestant Minister Pierre Jurieu having responded to the Histoire des variations, Bossuet published the Avertissements aux protestants sur les lettres du ministre Jurieu contre l'Histoire des variations (Warnings to Protestants on the Letters of Minister Jurieu against the History of Variations, 1689–1691). In the fifth of these Avertissements (1690), he denied the thesis of the explicit or implicit contract between the prince and his subjects, which Jurieu supported, and formulated the famous sentence: "To condemn this state [= slavery], it would not only be condemn the law of nations, where servitude is admitted, as it appears by all the laws; but that would be to condemn the Holy Spirit, who commands slaves, through the mouth of St. Paul, to remain in their state, and does not oblige their masters to free them." Flaubert, in his Sottisier, noted that in the 19th century, Catholic theology had varied to the point of expressing ideas on slavery diametrically opposed to those of Bossuet.

For the moment, the Protestants were pulverised; but before long, they began to ask whether variation was necessarily so great an evil. Between 1691 and 1701, Bossuet corresponded with Leibniz with a view to reunion, but negotiations broke down precisely at this point. Leibniz thought his countrymen might accept individual Roman doctrines, but he flatly refused to guarantee that they would necessarily believe tomorrow what they believe today. He expressed preference for a church eternally variable and forever moving forwards.

Next, Protestant writers began to accumulate some alleged proofs of Rome's own variations; and here, they were backed up by Richard Simon, a priest of the Paris Oratory and the father of biblical criticism in France. He accused St Augustine, Bossuet's own special master, of having corrupted the primitive doctrine of grace.

Bossuet set to work on a Defense de la tradition, but Simon calmly went on to raise issues graver still. Under a veil of politely ironic circumlocutions, such as did not deceive the Bishop of Meaux, he claimed his right to interpret the Bible like any other book. Bossuet denounced him again and again; Simon told his friends he would wait until the old fellow was no more. Another Oratorian proved more dangerous still. Simon had endangered miracles by applying to them lay rules of evidence, but Malebranche abrogated miracles altogether. It was blasphemous, he argued, to suppose that the Author of nature would violate the law He had Himself established. Bossuet might scribble nova, mira, falsa in the margins of his book and urge Fénelon to attack them; Malebranche politely met his threats by saying that to be refuted by such a pen would do him too much honor. These repeated checks soured Bossuet's temper.

In his earlier controversies, he had borne himself with great magnanimity, and the Huguenot ministers he refuted had found him a kindly advocate at court. His approval of the revocation of the Edict of Nantes stopped far short of approving dragonnades within his Diocese of Meaux, but now his patience was waning. A dissertation by one Father Caffaro, an obscure Italian monk, became his excuse for writing certain, violent Maximes sur la comédie (1694), wherein he made an attack on the memory of Molière, dead more than twenty years.

==== Controversy with Fénelon ====
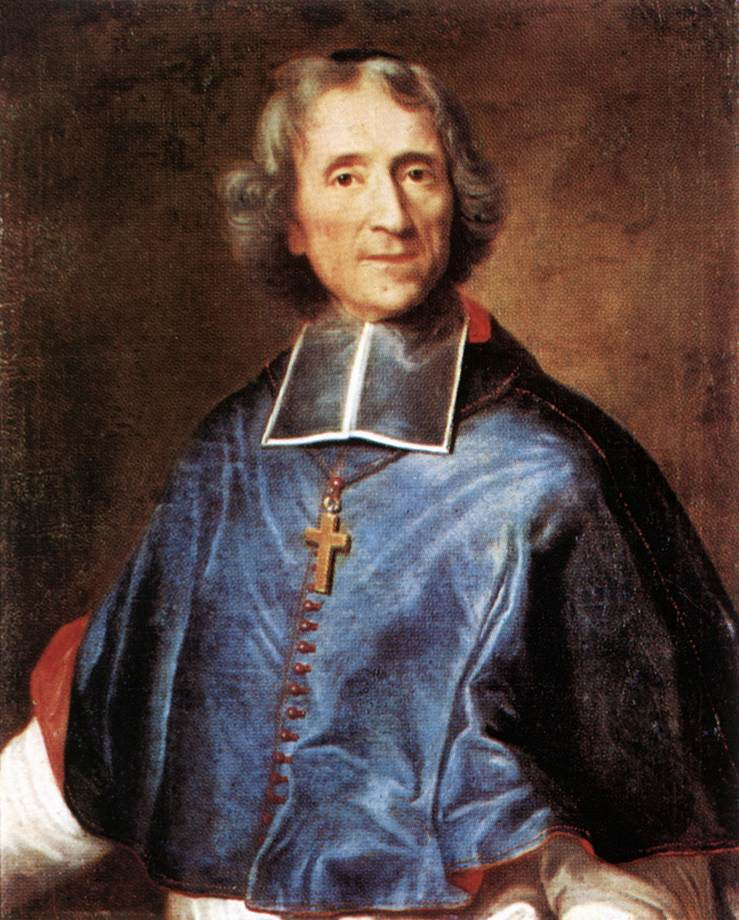
Fénelon (1651–1715), Bossuet's final rival

Three years later, he was battling with Bishop François Fénelon over the love of God. Fénelon, 24 years his junior, was an old pupil who had suddenly become a rival; like Bossuet, Fénelon was a bishop who served as a royal tutor.

The controversy concerned their different reactions to the opinions of Jeanne Guyon: her ideas were similar to the Quietism of Molinos, which was condemned by Pope Innocent XI in 1687. When Mme de Maintenon began questioning the orthodoxy of Mme Guyon's opinions, an ecclesiastical commission of three members, including Bossuet, was appointed to report on the matter. The commission issued 34 articles known as the Articles d'Issy, which condemned Mme Guyon's ideas very briefly and provided a short treatise on the orthodox, Catholic conception of prayer. Fénelon, who had been attracted to Mme Guyon's ideas, signed off on the Articles, and Mme Guyon submitted to the judgment.

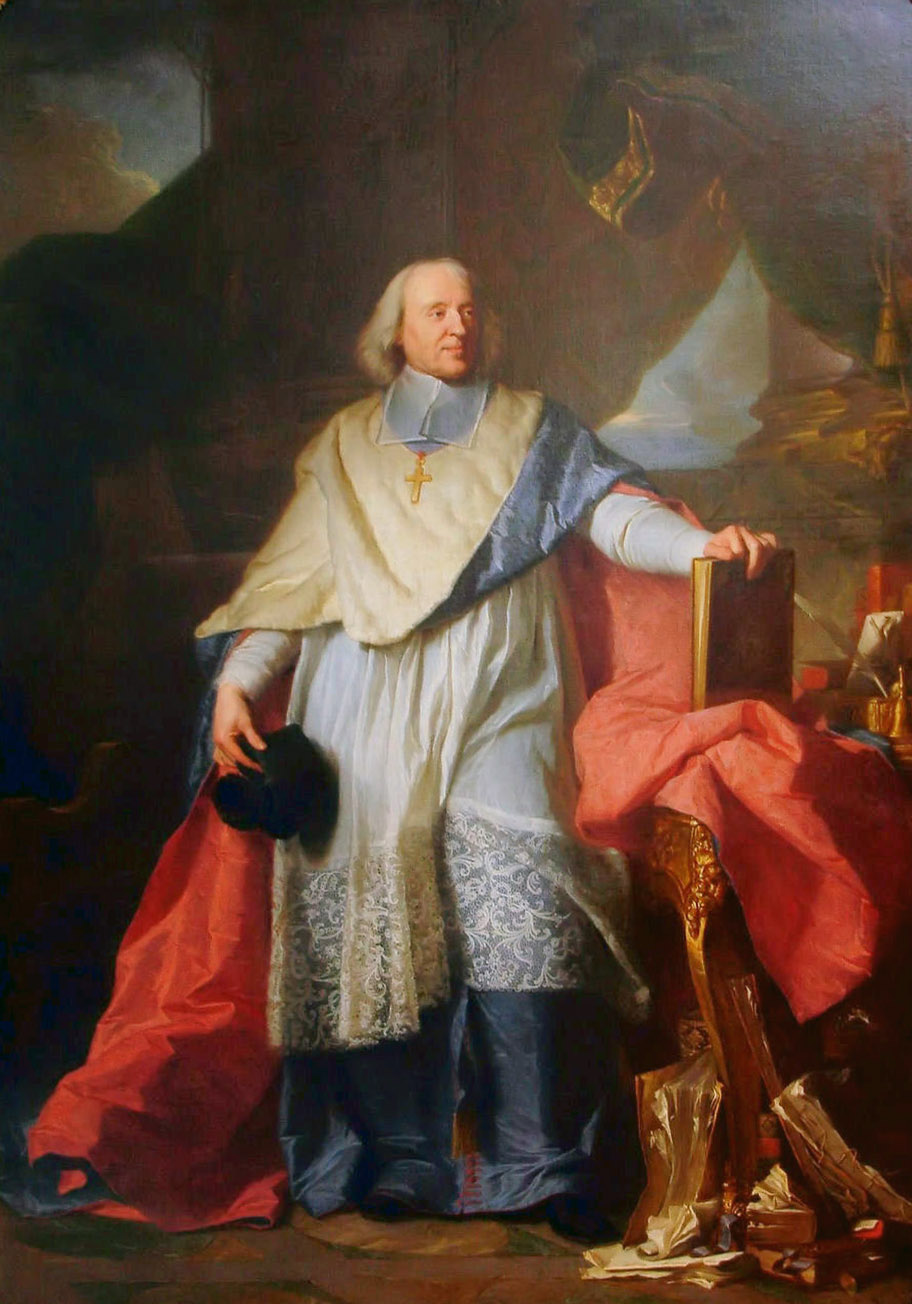
Bossuet in 1702

Bossuet now composed Instructions sur les états d'oraison, a work that explained the Articles d'Issy in greater depth. Fénelon refused to endorse this treatise, however, and instead composed his own explanation as to the meaning of the Articles d'Issy, his Explication des Maximes des Saints. He explained his view that the goal of human life should be to have love of God as its perfect object, with neither fear of punishment nor desire for the reward of eternal life having anything to do with this pure love of God. King Louis XIV reproached Bossuet for failing to warn him that his grandsons' tutor had such unorthodox opinions and instructed Bossuet and other bishops to respond to the Maximes des Saints.

Bossuet and Fénelon thus spent the years 1697–1699 battling each other in pamphlets and letters until the Inquisition finally condemned the Maximes des Saints on 12 March 1699. Pope Innocent XII selected 23 specific passages for condemnation. Bossuet triumphed in the controversy and Fénelon submitted to Rome's determination of the matter.

==== Death ====
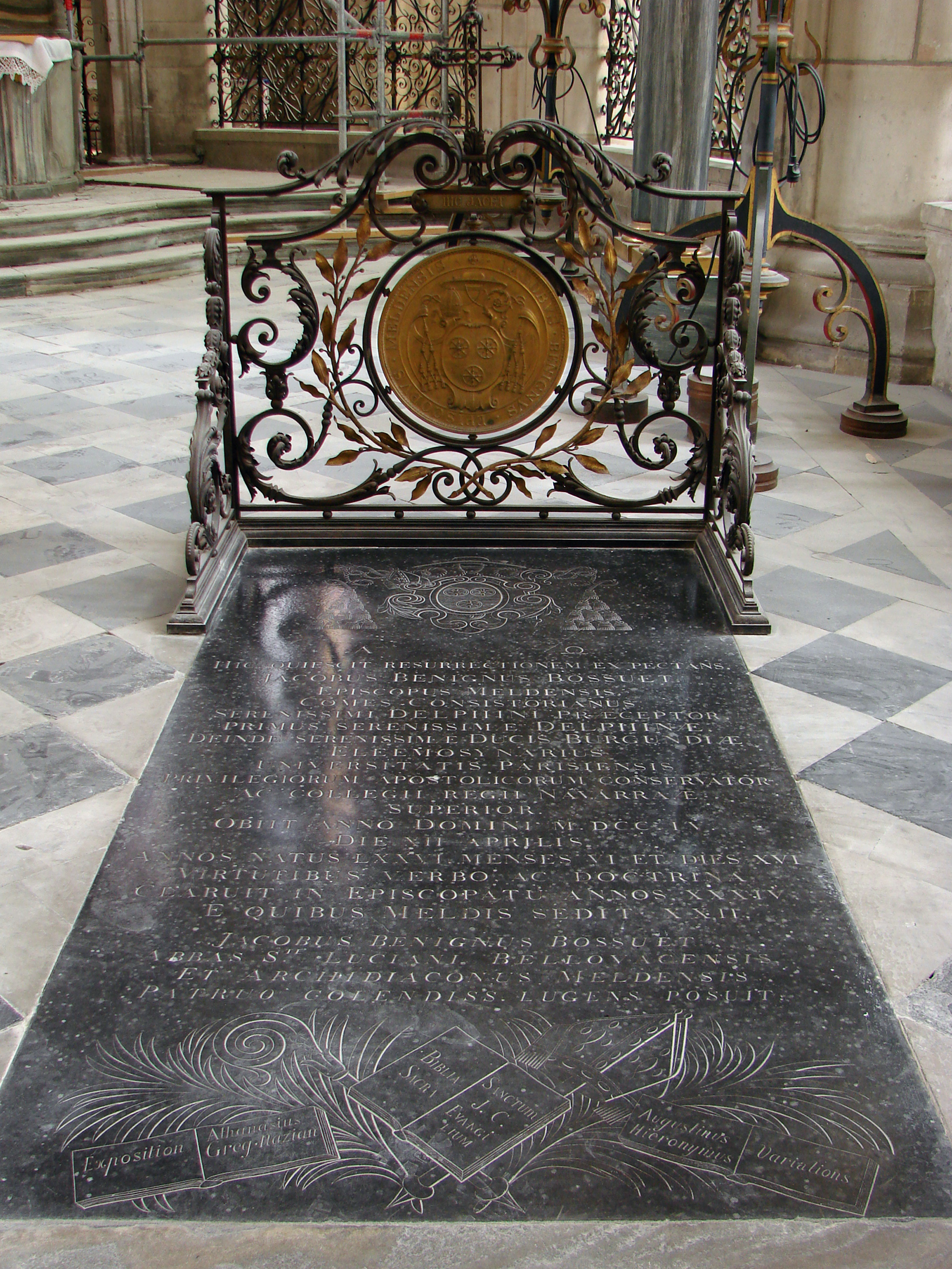
Bossuet's tomb in Meaux cathedral

Until he was over 70 years, Bossuet enjoyed good health, but in 1702 he developed chronic kidney stones. Two years later he was a hopeless invalid, and on 12 April 1704 he died quietly. His funeral oration was given by the Jesuit Charles de la Rue. He was buried in Meaux Cathedral.

== Preaching ==
Bossuet is widely considered to be one of the most influential homilists of all time. He is one of the preachers, along with John Tillotson and Louis Bourdaloue, who began the transition from Baroque to Neoclassical preaching. He preached with a simple eloquence that eschewed the grandiose extravagances of earlier preaching. He focused on ethical rather than doctrinal messages, often drawing from the lives of saints or saintly contemporaries as examples. He preached, for example, on St. Francis de Sales as well as funeral orations on Queen Henrietta Maria of France and Henrietta Anne of England. Bossuet's funeral orations in particular had lasting importance and were translated early into many languages, including English. Voltaire, normally antagonistic toward clergy, praised his oratorical excellence. The Catholic Encyclopedia (1913) calls Bossuet the greatest pulpit orator of all time, ranking him ahead of Augustine and Chrysostom. The exterior of Harvard's Sanders Theater includes busts of the eight greatest orators of all time – they include a bust of Bossuet alongside such giants of oratory as Demosthenes, Cicero, and Chrysostom.

== Works ==
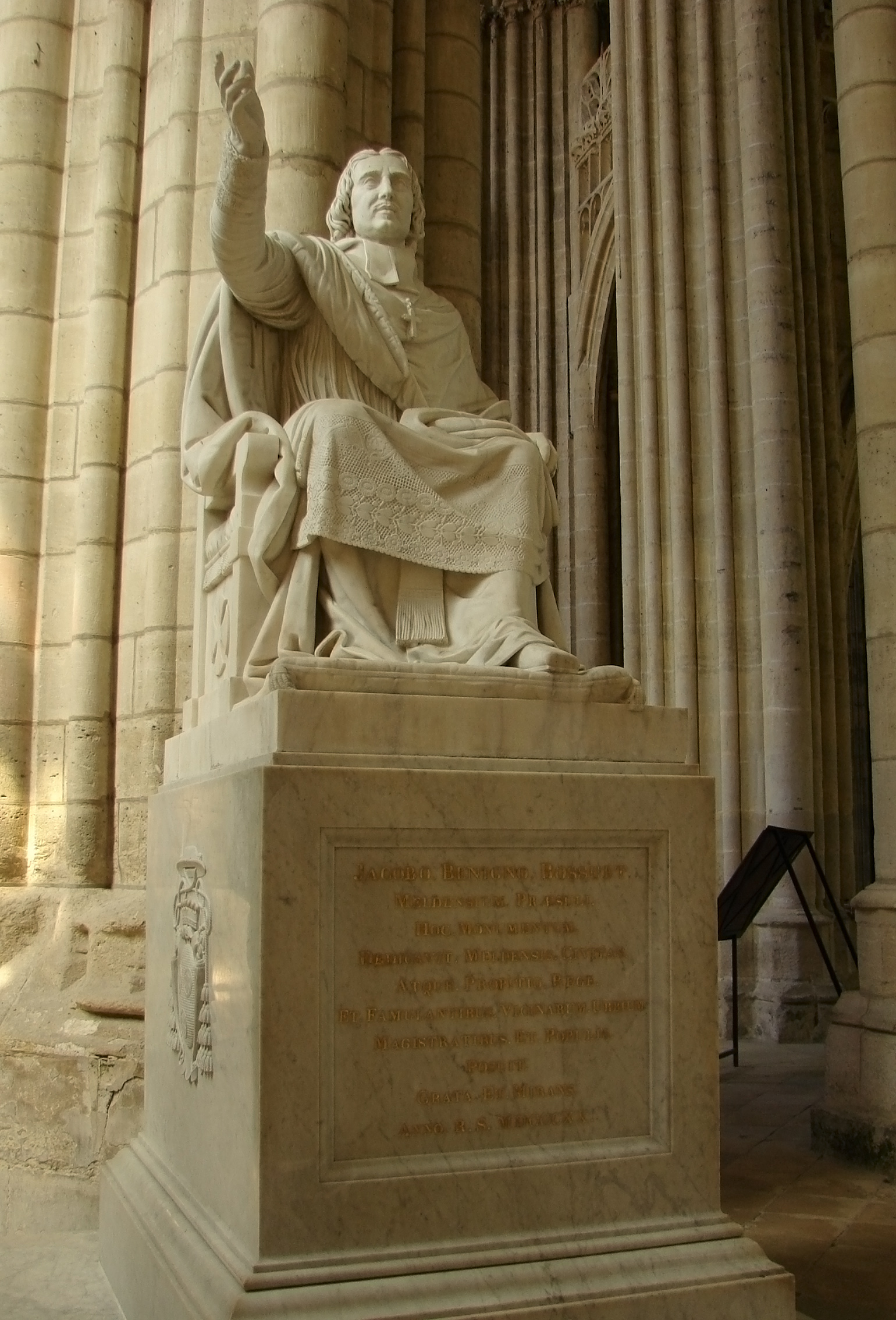
19th-century statue of Bossuet in Meaux Cathedral

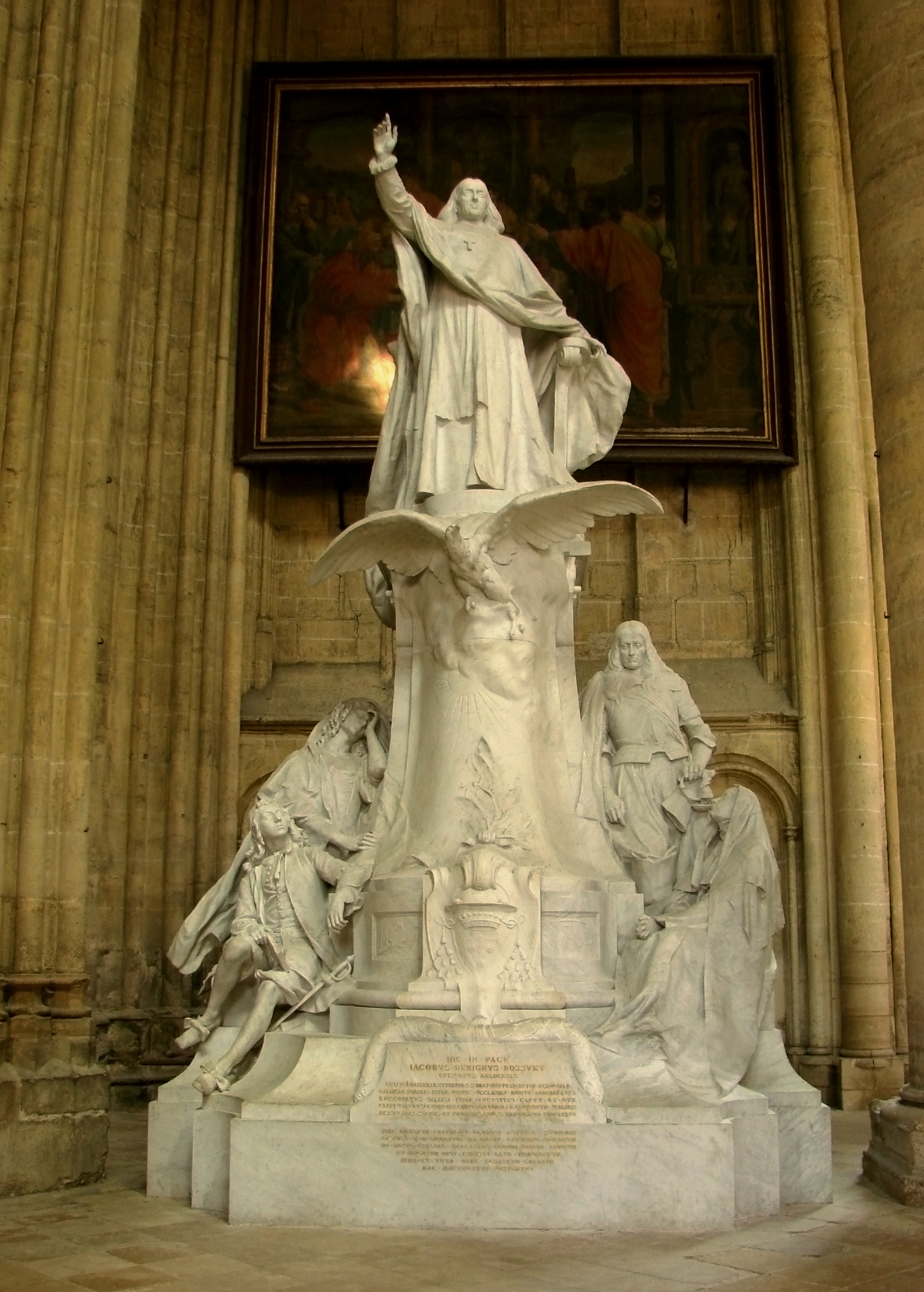
20th-century statue of Bossuet, sculpted by Ernest Henri Dubois, on display in Meaux Cathedral

An edition of Bossuet's sermons was edited by Abbé Lebarq in 6 Vols. (Paris, 1890, 1896), as the Œuvres oratoires de Bossuet. His complete works were edited by Lachat in 31 Vols. (Paris, 1862–1864).

- Méditation sur la brièveté de la vie (1648) [Meditation on the Brevity of Life]
- Réfutation du catéchisme de Paul Ferry (1655) [Refutation of Paul Ferry's Catechism]
- Oraison funèbre de Yolande de Monterby (1656) [Funeral Oration of Yolande de Monterby]
- Oracion funebre e Valeria Slazar (1657) [Funeral Oration of Valeria Salazar]
- Panégyrique de saint Paul (1659) [Eulogy of Saint Paul]
- Oraison funèbre de Nicolas Cornet (1663)
- Oraison funèbre d'Anne d'Autriche (1667)
- Oraison funèbre d'Henriette Marie de France (1669)
- Oraison funèbre d'Henriette d'Angleterre (1670)
- Exposition de la doctrine de l'église catholique sur les matières de controverse (1671)
- Sermon pour la Profession de Mademoiselle de La Vallière (1675)
- Traité de la connaissance de Dieu et de soi-même (1677)
- Traité du libre arbitre (1677)
- Logique (1677 – published only in 1828)
- Conférence avec le pasteur Claude (1678 – published 1682)
- Discours sur l'histoire universelle (Discourse on Universal History) (1681)
- Politique tirée de l'Écriture sainte (Politics Drawn from the Very Words of Holy Scripture) (1679 – published 1709)
- Sermon sur l'unité de l'Église (1682)
- Oraison funèbre de Marie Thérèse (1683)
- Oraison funèbre d' Anne de Gonzague, princesse Palatine (1685)
- Oraison funèbre de Michel Le Tellier (1686)
- Oraison funèbre de Mme du Blé d'Uxelles (1686)
- Oraison funèbre du prince de Condé (1687)
- Catéchisme du diocèse de Meaux (1687)
- Histoire des variations des Églises protestantes (1688)
- Explication de l'Apocalypse (1689)
- Avertissements aux Protestants (I, II, III) (1689)
- Avertissements aux Protestants (IV, V, VI) (1690–91)
- Défense de l'Histoire des variations (1690–91)
- Correspondence avec Leibniz (1691–93)
- Défense de la Tradition et des Saints Pères (1691–93)
- Traité de la concupiscence (1691–93)
- Lettre au P. Caffaro (1694–95)
- Maximes et réflexions sur la comédie (1694–95)
- Méditation sur l'Evangile (1694–95)
- Élévations sur les mystères (1694–95)
- Instructions sur les états d'oraison (replying to Fénelon) (1697)
- Relation sur le quiétisme (1698)
- Instructions pastorales pour les Protestants (manual for Protestant converts to Catholicism) (1701)
- The Sermon on the Mount (English translation) (1900)

=== Politics Drawn from the Very Words of Holy Scripture ===
When Bossuet was chosen to be the tutor of the Dauphin, oldest child of Louis XIV, he wrote several works for the edification of his pupil, one of which was Politics Derived from the Words of Holy Scripture, a discourse on the principles of royal absolutism. The work was published posthumously in 1709.

The work consists of several books which are divided into articles and propositions which lay out the nature, characteristics, duties, and resources of royalty. To justify his propositions, Bossuet quotes liberally from the Bible and various psalms.

Throughout his essay, Bossuet emphasises the fact that royal authority comes directly from God and that the person of the king is sacred. In the third book, Bossuet asserts that "God establishes kings as his ministers, and reigns through them over the people." He also states that "the prince must be obeyed on principle, as a matter of religion and of conscience." While he declares the absolute authority of rulers, he emphasises the fact that kings must use their power only for the public good and that the king is not above the law "for if he sins, he destroys the laws by his example."

In books six and seven, Bossuet describes the duties of the subjects to the prince and the special duties of royalty. For Bossuet, the prince was synonymous with the state, which is why, according to him, the subjects of the prince owe the prince the same duties that they owe their country. He also states that "only public enemies make a separation between the interest of the prince and the interest of the state." As far as the duties of royalty, the primary goal is the preservation of the state. Bossuet describes three ways that this can be achieved: by maintaining a good constitution, making good use of the state's resources, and protecting the state from the dangers and difficulties that threaten it.

In books nine and ten, Bossuet outlines the various resources of royalty (arms, wealth, and counsel) and how they should be used. In regards to arms, Bossuet explains that there are just and unjust grounds for war. Unjust causes include ambitious conquest, pillage, and jealousy. As far as wealth is concerned, he then lays out the types of expenditures that a king has and the various sources of wealth for the kingdom. He emphasises that the true wealth of a kingdom is its men and says that it is important to improve the people's lot and that there would be no more poor.

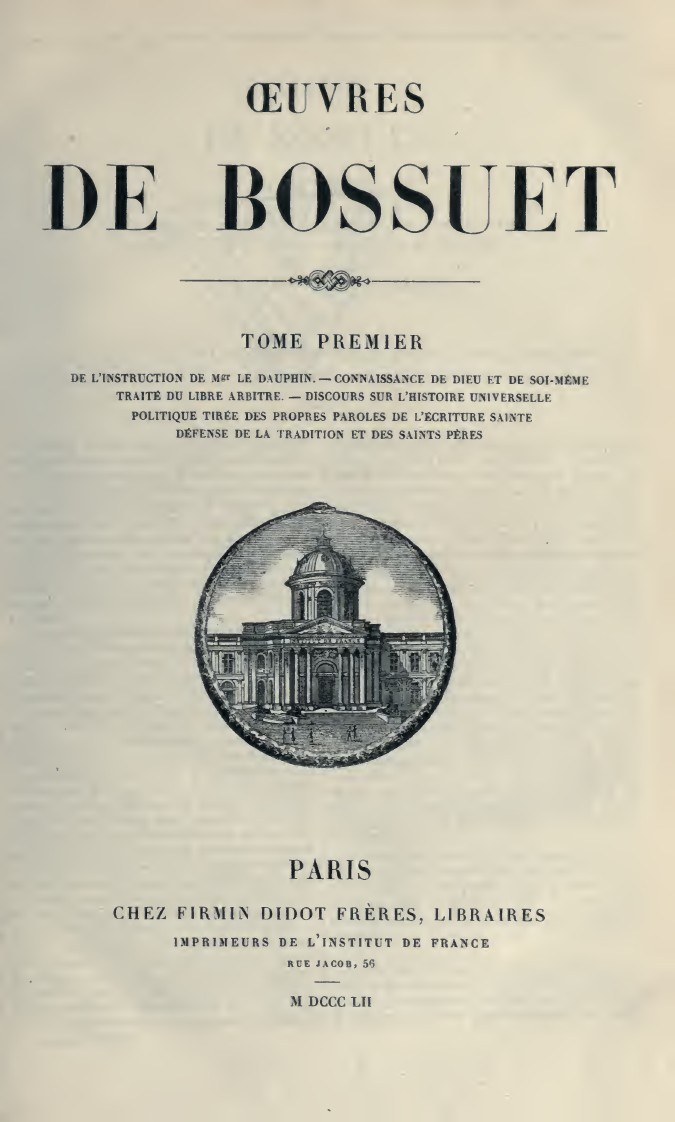
Oeuvres, 1852

== See also ==
- Louis Bossuet
