= Claude-Adrien Nonnotte =

French Jesuit controversialist

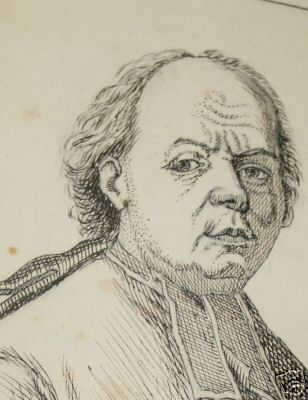
Claude-Adrien Nonnotte, by unknown French Artist, 18th Century

Claude-Adrien Nonnotte (born in Besançon, 29 July 1711; died there, 3 September 1793) was a French Jesuit controversialist, best known for his writings against Voltaire.

== Biography ==
At nineteen he entered the Society of Jesus and preached at Amiens, Versailles, and Turin. When Voltaire began to issue his Essai sur les moeurs (1754), which the Catholic Church considered an attack on Christianity, Nonnotte published, anonymously, the Examen critique ou Réfutation du livre des moeurs; and when Voltaire finished his publication (1758), Nonnotte revised his book, which he published as Erreurs de Voltaire (2 vols., 1762). He dealt with what he saw as historical and doctrinal errors contained in Voltaire's work. Nonnotte's work reached the sixth edition in 1774. Voltaire retorted in his Eclaircissements historiques, and the back and forth attacks continued for twenty years.

Nonnotte's publication continued to circulate, and was translated into Italian, German, Polish, and Portuguese. After the suppression of the Jesuits by king Louis XV, Nonnotte withdrew to Besançon. In 1779 he added a third volume to the Erreurs de Voltaire, namely, L'esprit de Voltaire dans ses écrits, for which he could not obtain the approval of the Paris censor. Against the Dictionnaire philosophique, in which Voltaire had recapitulated all his attacks on Christianity, Nonnotte published the Dictionnaire philosophique de la religion (Avignon, 1772), in which he replied to all the objections then brought against religion. The work was translated into Italian and German.

Towards the end of his life Nonnotte published Les philosophes des trois premiers siècles (Paris, 1789), in which he contrasted the ancient and the modern philosophers. The work was translated into German. He also wrote Lettre à un ami sur les honnêtetés littéraires (Paris, 1766), and Réponse aux Éclaircissements historiques et aux additions de Voltaire (Paris, 1774). These publications obtained for their author a eulogistic Brief from Pope Clement XIII (1768), and the congratulations of St. Alphonsus Liguori. The latter declared that he had always at hand his "golden works" in which the chief truths of the Faith were defended with learning and propriety against the objections of Voltaire and his friends. Nonnotte was also the author of L'emploi de l'argent (Avignon, 1787), translated from Maffei; Le gouvernement des paroisses (posthumous, Paris, 1802). All were published under the title Oeuvres de Nonnotte (Besançon, 1819).

== Works ==
- 1757: Examen critique ou Réfutation du livre des moeurs
- 1762: The Errors of Voltaire
- 1766: Lettre à un ami sur les honnêtetés littéraires
- 1766: Les erreurs de Voltaire, nouvelle édition, revue, corrigée, augmentée, avec la réponse aux éclaircissements historiques et aux additions de Voltaire, Compagnie des libraires, Amsterdam, in-8°, (2),48, 536, (4),(2), 475 et (2) S.
- 1772: Philosophic Dictionary of Religion
- 1774: Réponse aux Éclaircissements historiques et aux additions de Voltaire
- 1779: The Spirit of Voltaire as shown by his writings
- 1787: L'emploi de l'argent
- 1802: Le gouvernement des paroisses, édition posthume
- 1819: Les philosophes des trois premiers siècles de l'église, Gauthier, Besançon, édition posthume
- Petit traité philosophique sur la religion
