= Discourse on Universal History =

Book by Jacques-Bénigne Bossuet

Discourse on Universal History (French: Discours sur l'histoire universelle) is a 1681 work of theology and philosophy by Roman Catholic bishop Jacques-Bénigne Bossuet.
