= Voltaire Foundation =

Research department of the University of Oxford

Coordinates: 51.7678°N 1.2621°W

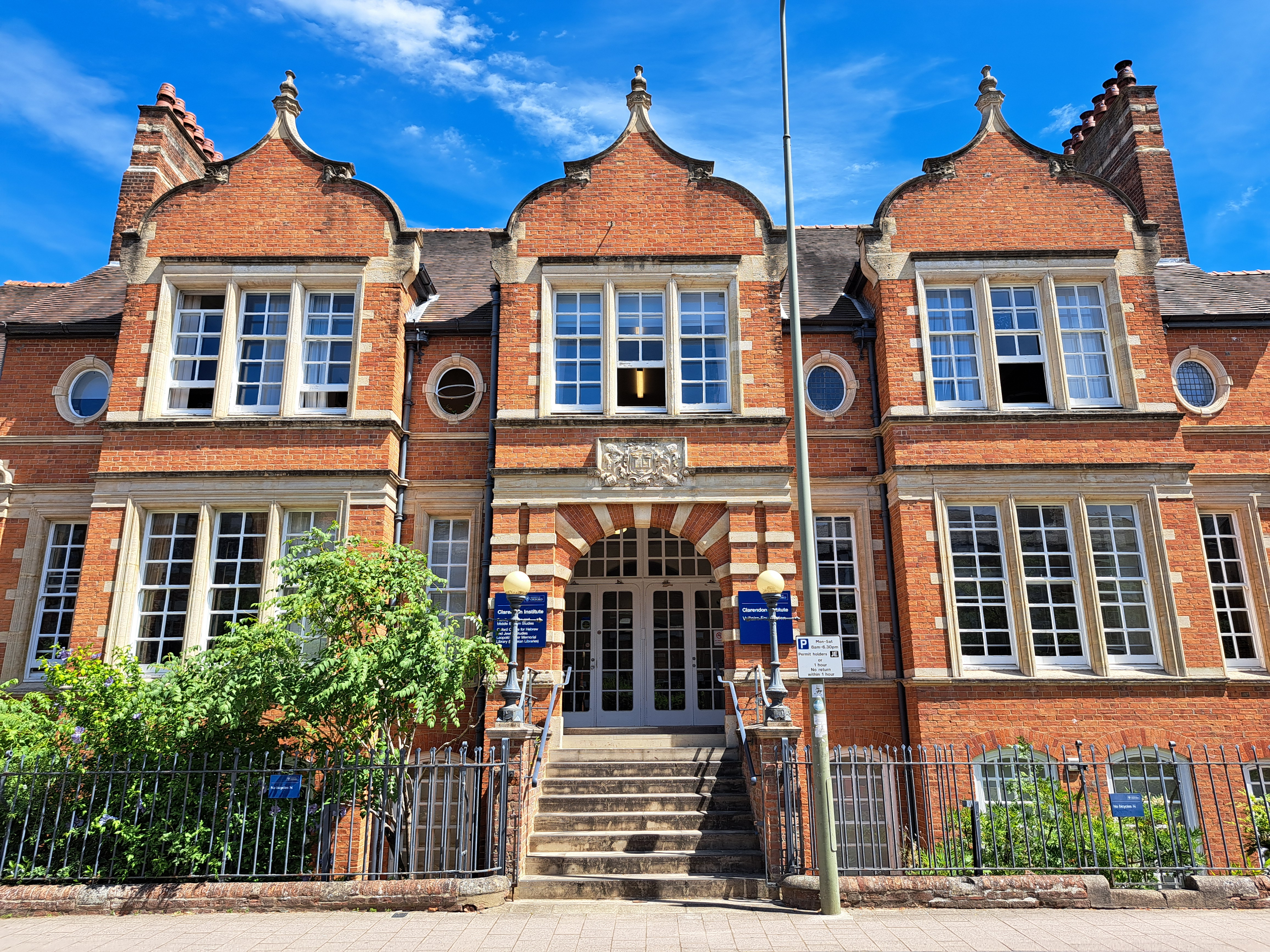
Home of the Voltaire Foundation

The Voltaire Foundation is a research department of the University of Oxford, founded by Theodore Besterman in the 1970s. It publishes the definitive edition of the Complete Works of Voltaire (Œuvres complètes de Voltaire), as well as Oxford University Studies in the Enlightenment (previously SVEC, Studies on Voltaire and the Eighteenth Century), a monograph series devoted to the eighteenth century, and the correspondences (letters) of several key French thinkers. Directed by Thomas Wynn, it forms part of Oxford's Humanities Division.

== Origin ==
In the 1950s, the bibliographer and translator Theodore Besterman started to collect, transcribe and publish all of Voltaire's writings. He founded the Voltaire Institute and Museum in Geneva where he began publishing collected volumes of Voltaire's correspondence. During the final years of his life, Besterman opened discussions with the University of Oxford. These culminated in him naming the university his residuary legatee and arranging for the posthumous transfer of his collection of books and manuscripts, which included many collective editions, to the Taylor Institution (the university centre for modern languages). The Institution dedicated a room as the Voltaire Room in January 1975, to house Besterman's collection and The Taylor Institution's own. Following Besterman’s death on 10 November 1976, the Voltaire Foundation was vested permanently in the University of Oxford.

== Complete Works of Voltaire ==
The Complete Works of Voltaire (Œuvres complètes de Voltaire), the first critical edition of the totality of his writings arranged chronologically, was completed in April 2022 and comprises 205 volumes. In 2010, the foundation was awarded the Prix Hervé Deluen by the Académie Française for this fifty-year project.

== Oxford University Studies in the Enlightenment (previously SVEC) ==
Since its inception as Studies on Voltaire and the Eighteenth Century in 1955, nearly 550 books have been published within this series. It publishes scholarly work in English or French across a broad range of disciplines, including history, the history of ideas/philosophy, the history of the book, theatre, literature, visual arts and music, science and economics, and gender studies.
