= 1733 in poetry =

| List of years in poetry | (table) |
- … 1723; 1724; 1725; 1726; 1727; 1728; 1729; 1730; 1731; 1732; 1733; 1734; 1735; 1736; 1737; 1738; 1739; 1740; 1741; 1742; 1743 …
- In literature 1730 1731 1732 1733 1734 1735 1736
- Art; Archaeology; Architecture; Literature; Music; Philosophy; Science; +...

Nationality words link to articles with information on the nation's poetry or literature (for instance, Irish or France).

== Works published ==
=== United Kingdom ===
- Anonymous, Verses Address'd to the Imitator of the First Satire of the Second Book of Horace, "By a lady", has been attributed to Lady Mary Wortley Montagu
- John Banks, Poems on Several Occasions
- Samuel Bowden, Poetical Essays on Several Occasions, Volume 1 (Volume 2 published 1735)
- James Bramston, The Man of Taste, response to Alexander Pope's Epistle to Burlington 1731 (see also Thomas Newcomb's The Woman of Taste, below)
- John Durant Breval, writing under the pen name "Joseph Gay", Morality in Vice: An heroi-comical poem, republished this year as The Lure of Venus
- Mary Chandler, A Description of Bath
- Thomas Fitzgerald, Poems on Several Occasions
- Matthew Green, writing under the pen name "Peter Drake", The Grotto
- James Hammond, An Elegy to a Young Lady, in the Manner of Ovid, published anonymously
- John Hervey, 2nd Baron Hervey, An Epistle from a Nobleman to a Doctor of Divinity, published anonymously
- George Lyttelton, 1st Baron Lyttelton, Advice to a Lady, published anonymously
- David Mallet, Of Verbal Criticism: An epistle to Mr. Pope
- Mary Masters, Poems on Several Occasions
- Thomas Newcomb, The Woman of Taste, published anonymously, but "attribution to Newcomb is probable", according to The Concise Oxford Chronology of English Literature (occasioned by James Bramston's The Man of Taste, see above)
- Alexander Pope:
  - Of the Use of Riches: An Epistle to Lord Bathurst, published this year, although the book states "1732"
  - The First Satire of the Second Book of Horace, with parallel English and Latin texts (see also First Satire 1734)
  - An Essay on Man, Epistles 1–3 (completed 1734),
  - The Impertinent; or, A Visit to the Court, published anonymously
- Elizabeth Rowe, Letters Moral and Entertaining, in Prose and Verse (see also Letters on Various Occasions 1729, Letters Moral and Entertaining 1731)
- Jonathan Swift:
  - The Life and Genuine Character of Doctor Swift (see also Verses on the Death of Dr. Swift 1739 — Swift did not die until 1745)
  - On Poetry: A Rhapsody, published anonymously (see also A Rap at the Rhapsody 1734)

=== Other ===
- Jean-Baptiste-Louis Gresset, Ver-Vert, about a parrot at a convent who shocks listeners with his bad language (some sources give the year of publication as 1734); France

== Births ==
Death years link to the corresponding "[year] in poetry" article:

- January 12 – Antoine-Marin Lemierre (died 1793), French poet and playwright
- March 18 – Christoph Friedrich Nicolai (died 1811), German writer, publisher, critic, author of satirical novels, regional historian, and a key figure of the Enlightenment in Berlin
- September 5 – Christoph Martin Wieland (died 1813), German poet, translator and editor
- Isaac Bickerstaffe (died 1812), Irish poet and playwright
- Robert Lloyd (died 1764), English poet and satirist

== Deaths ==
Birth years link to the corresponding "[year] in poetry" article:

- Bernard Mandeville (born 1670), English philosopher, political economist, poet and satirist
- John Morgan died 1733 or 1734 (born 1688), Welsh clergyman, scholar and poet
- Richard Lewis (born c. 1700), English Colonial American

== See also ==
- Poetry
- List of years in poetry
- List of years in literature
- 18th century in poetry
- 18th century in literature
- Augustan poetry
- Scriblerus Club

== Notes ==
- "A Timeline of English Poetry" Web page of the Representative Poetry Online Web site, University of Toronto
