= 1731 in poetry =

List of years in poetry	(table)
- … 1721; 1722; 1723; 1724; 1725; 1726; 1727; 1728; 1729; 1730; 1731; 1732; 1733; 1734; 1735; 1736; 1737; 1738; 1739; 1740; 1741 …
- In literature 1728 1729 1730 1731 1732 1733 1734
- Art; Archaeology; Architecture; Literature; Music; Philosophy; Science; +...

Nationality words link to articles with information on the nation's poetry or literature (for instance, Irish or France).

== Events ==
- January 1 – The Gentleman's Magazine is started and edited by Edward Cave ("Sylvanus Urban") in London. Published monthly through September, it will continue into the 20th century.
- October 23 – Fire at Ashburnham House in London damages the nationally-owned Cotton library, housed here at this time. The original manuscript of the Old English The Battle of Maldon is destroyed; the unique manuscript of Beowulf is damaged but saved.

== Works published ==
=== Colonial America ===
- Ebenezer Cooke, attributed, The Maryland Muse, a collection, including "The History of Colonel Nathaniel Bacon's Rebellion"
- Richard Lewis, Food for Criticks, criticizing fellow American colonists for not respecting and revering the land as the Indians did
- John Seccomb, "Father Abbey's Will", popular, humorous verse, written when the author was a student at Harvard, about one of the college's custodians and bed-makers; it prompts a sequel, "A Letter of Courtship", addressed to Father Abbey's widow from a custodian at Yale, an example of the rivalry between the two early schools

=== United Kingdom ===
- Nicholas Amhurst, writing under the pen name "Caleb D'Anvers", A Collection of Poems on Several Occasions
- Samuel Boyse, Translations and Poems Written on Several Subjects
- Robert Dodsley:
  - An Epistle from a Footman in London to the Celebrated Stephen Duck, published anonymously
  - A Sketch of the Miseries of Poverty, anonymous
- Aaron Hill, Advice to the Poets
- Alexander Pope, An Epistle to the Right Honourable Richard Earl of Burlington, also known later as The Epistle "Of Taste" (see also Bramston, The Man of Taste 1733
- John Wilmot, Earl of Rochester, Poems on Several Occasions. By the R. H. the E. of R., London, posthumous

== Births ==
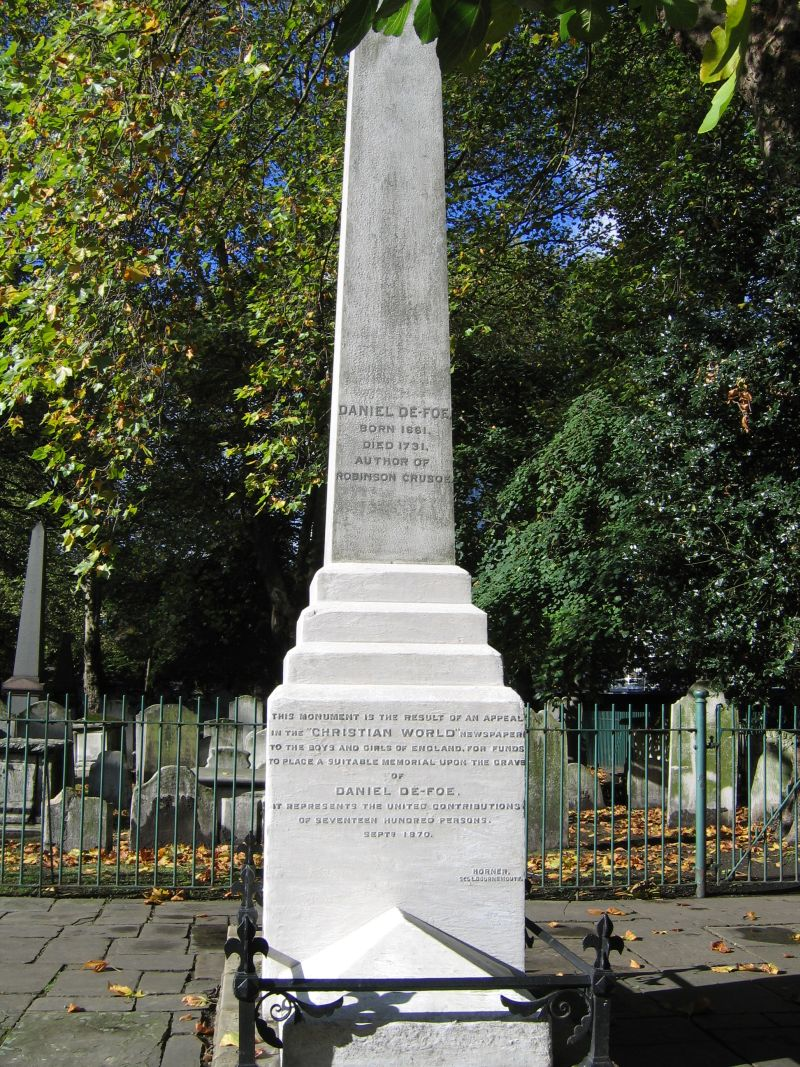
Memorial to Daniel Defoe, who dies this year, Bunhill Fields, London

Death years link to the corresponding "[year] in poetry" article:

- January 9 – John Scott (died 1783), English poet and friend of Samuel Johnson
- April 16 – Jacob Bailey (died 1808), Church of England clergyman and poet born in the United States (colony of New Hampshire), immigrated to Nova Scotia, Canada in 1779
- Before June 11 – Francis Grose (died 1791), English antiquary, draughtsman and lexicographer
- September 2 – Johann Friedrich von Cronegk (died 1758), German dramatist, poet and essayist
- September 21 – Samuel Bishop (died 1795), English poet
- November 26 – William Cowper (died 1800), English poet
- December 12 – Erasmus Darwin (died 1802), English physician, natural philosopher, physiologist, inventor and poet (grandfather of Charles Darwin)
- John Freeth (died 1808), English provincial poet and coffee-house proprietor
- Ephraim Kuh (died 1790), German poet
- Approximate date – William Woty (died 1791), English writer of light verse and law clerk

== Deaths ==
Birth years link to the corresponding "[year] in poetry" article:

- February 3 – Elizabeth Thomas (born 1675), English poet
- February 20 – Frances Norton, Lady Norton (born 1644), English religious poet and prose writer
- March 5 – Abd al-Ghani al-Nabulsi (born 1641), Syrian Arabic scholar
- April 24 or April 25 (exact date unknown) – Daniel Defoe (born 1659), English author, writer, journalist, spy and poet, probably while in hiding from his creditors. He is interred in Bunhill Fields, London, where his grave can still be visited
- May 11 – Mary Astell (born 1666), English feminist writer
- June 20 – Ned Ward (born 1667), English satirical writer and publican
- December 26 – Antoine Houdar de la Motte, 59 (born 1672), French poet and author

== See also ==
- Poetry
- List of years in poetry
- List of years in literature
- 18th century in poetry
- 18th century in literature
- Augustan poetry
- Scriblerus Club

== Notes ==
- "A Timeline of English Poetry". Representative Poetry Online. University of Toronto.
