= 1729 in literature =

| List of years in literature | (table) |
- … 1719; 1720; 1721; 1722; 1723; 1724; 1725; 1726; 1727; 1728; 1729; 1730; 1731; 1732; 1733; 1734; 1735; 1736; 1737; 1738; 1739 …
- In poetry 1726 1727 1728 1729 1730 1731 1732
- Art; Archaeology; Architecture; Literature; Music; Philosophy; Science; +...

This article contains information about the literary events and publications of 1729.

== Events ==
- November 28 – The English theologian Thomas Woolston is convicted of blasphemy and sentenced to prison for the remaining four years of his life on account of his published Discourses on Biblical literalism.
- unknown date – Charles Perrault's Histoires ou contes du temps passé (1697) is translated into English for the first time, by Robert Samber as Histories or Tales of Past Times, told by Mother Goose. It includes such favourite fairy tales as Cinderella, Little Red Riding Hood and Puss in Boots.

== New books ==
=== Prose ===
- James Bramston – The Art of Politics
- Henry Carey – Poems on Several Occasions
- Edward Cooke – Battel of the Poets
- Thomas Cooke – Tales, Epistles, Odes, Fables
- Daniel Defoe as Andrew Moreton, Esq. – Second Thoughts are Best: or, a Further Improvement of a Late Scheme to Prevent Street Robberies
- Robert Drury – Madagascar, or Robert Drury's Journal
- William Hatchett – The Adventures of Abdalla (translated from the French of Jean-Paul Bignon first published in Paris, 1712, as Les Avantures d'Abdalla)
- Eliza Haywood – The Fair Hebrew; or, A True, but Secret History of Two Jewish Ladies
- Thomas Innes – Critical Essay on the Ancient Inhabitants of the Northern Parts of Britain
- Soame Jenyns – The Art of Dancing
- William Law – A Serious Call to a Devout and Holy Life (extremely popular devotional manual)
- Daniel Mace – The New Testament in Greek and English (a diaglot)
- Isaac Newton – The Mathematical Principles of Natural Philosophy (English translation of Newton's Latin work)
- John Oldmixon – The History of England, during the Reigns of the Royal House of Stuart
- William Pulteney – The Honest Jury
- James Ralph – Clarinda
- Elizabeth Singer Rowe – Letters on Various Occasions
- Richard Savage – The Wanderer
- Christmas Samuel - Golwg ar y Testament Newydd
- Thomas Sherlock – The Tryal of the Witnesses of the Resurrection of Jesus
- Jonathan Swift
  - An Epistle Upon an Epistle From a Certain Doctor to a Certain Great Lord
  - A Modest Proposal
- Jacob Campo Weyerman - De levens-beschryvingen der Nederlandsche konst-schilders en konst-schilderessen (The Lives of Dutch painters and paintresses)
- William Wycherley – The Posthumous Works of William Wycherley ii. (see 1728)
- Benito Jerónimo Feijoo – Ilustración apologética

=== Children ===
- Robert Samber – Histories or Tales of Past Times, told by Mother Goose

=== Drama ===
- Colley Cibber – Love in a Riddle
- Charles Coffey – The Beggar's Wedding
- John Gay – Polly (sequel to The Beggar's Opera, banned from performance by Walpole)
- Eliza Haywood – Frederick, Duke of Brunswick-Lunenburgh
- Charles Johnson – The Village Opera (opera)
- Samuel Johnson – Hurlothrumbo, or The Supernatural
- Samuel Madden – Themistocles
- Thomas Odell
  - The Patron
  - The Smuglers
- James Thomson – Britannia

=== Poetry ===
- Moses Browne – Piscatory Eclogues
- Alexander Pope – The Dunciad, Variorum

== Births ==
- January 12 – Edmund Burke, Irish political writer and politician (died 1797)
- January 22 – Gotthold Ephraim Lessing, German writer, dramatist and critic (died 1781)
- January 23 – Clara Reeve, English novelist (died 1807)
- April 13 – Thomas Percy, English poet, translator and bishop (died 1811)
- August 11 – Ponce Denis Écouchard Lebrun, French poet (died 1807)
- September 6 – Moses Mendelssohn, German philosopher of the Haskalah or Jewish enlightenment (died 1786)
- September 25 – Christian Gottlob Heyne German classicist and archaeologist (died 1812)
- September 29 – John Duncombe, English poet, antiquary and cleric (died 1786)
- Unknown date – Thomas Hawkins, English literary editor and cleric (died 1772)

== Deaths ==
- January 19 – William Congreve, English dramatist and poet (born 1670)
- May 17 – Samuel Clarke, English philosopher and cleric (born 1675)
- September 1 – Richard Steele, Irish journalist, satirist and dramatist (born 1672)
- October 9 – Sir Richard Blackmore, English poet and religious writer (born 1654)
- November 16 – Abel Boyer, French-born lexicographer, journalist and miscellanist (born c. 1667)
- December 13 – Anthony Collins, English philosopher (born 1676)
- December 26 – Honoré Tournély, French theologian (b. 1658)
- Unknown date – Gershom Carmichael, Scottish philosopher (born c. 1672)
