= 1736 in poetry =

List of years in poetry	(table)
- … 1726; 1727; 1728; 1729; 1730; 1731; 1732; 1733; 1734; 1735; 1736; 1737; 1738; 1739; 1740; 1741; 1742; 1743; 1744; 1745; 1746 …
- In literature 1733 1734 1735 1736 1737 1738 1739
- Art; Archaeology; Architecture; Literature; Music; Philosophy; Science; +...

Nationality words link to articles with information on the nation's poetry or literature (for instance, Irish or France).

== Works published ==
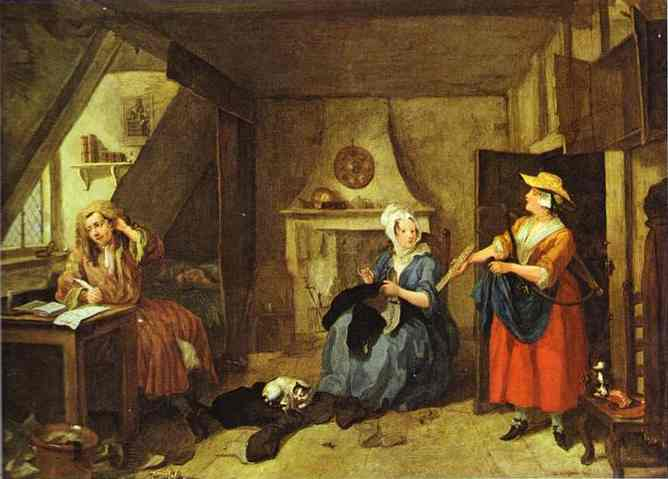
William Hogarth's The Distrest Poet, likely inspired by Alexander Pope's The Dunciad, painted about this year

=== United Kingdom ===
- John Armstrong, The Oeconomy of Love, published anonymously
- Isaac Hawkins Browne the elder, A Pipe of Tobacco, anonymously published, imitating Colly Cibber, Ambrose Philips, James Thomson, Edward Young, Alexander Pope and Jonathan Swift
- Mather Byles, To His Excellency Governor Belcher, on the Death of His lady. An Epistle. English Colonial America
- William Dawson, Poems on Several Occasions, anonymously published; influenced by the style of Alexander Pope; English, Colonial America
- Stephen Duck, Poems on Several Occasions
- William Melmoth the Younger, Two Episodes of Horace Imitated
- Alexander Pope
  - Bounce to Fop: An heroick epistle from a dog at Twickenham to a dog at court
  - The Works of Alexander Pope, Volumes 3: fables, translations and imitations; Volume 4 includes The Dunciad (see also Works 1717, 1735 and 1737)
- Elizabeth Rowe, The History of Joseph
- James Thomson, last two parts of Liberty (see also Antient and Modern Italy; Greece; Rome 1735):
  - Britain, Part 4
  - The Prospect, Part 5, the last part

=== Other ===
- Johann Jakob Bodmer, Brief-Wechsel von der Natur des poetischen Geschmackes ("Exchange of letters on the nature of poetic taste"), German-language, published in Switzerland, criticism

== Births ==
Death years link to the corresponding "[year] in poetry" article:

- May 1 – Charles Jenner (died 1774), English poet, novelist and Anglican cleric
- May 8 – Caterina Dolfin (died 1793), Venetian poet
- June 28 – Gottlieb Konrad Pfeffel (died 1809), German writer, military scientist, educator and poet
- July 1 – Annis Boudinot Stockton (died 1801), poet and sponsor of literary salons in Colonial New Jersey
- October 27 – James Macpherson (died 1796), Scottish poet
- Hedvig Löfwenskiöld (died 1789), Swedish poet
- Johann Gottlieb Willamov (died 1777), German

== Deaths ==
Birth year links to the corresponding "[year] in poetry" article:

- Kada no Azumamaro 荷田春満 (born 1669), Japanese early Edo period poet, philologist and teacher as well as poetry tutor to one of the sons of Emperor Reigen; together with Keichū, co-founder of the kokugaku ("national studies") intellectual movement (surname: Kada)
- Thomas Yalden (born 1670), English poet and translator

== See also ==
- Poetry
- List of years in poetry
- List of years in literature
- 18th century in poetry
- 18th century in literature
- Augustan poetry
- Scriblerus Club

== Notes ==
- "A Timeline of English Poetry" Web page of the Representative Poetry Online Web site, University of Toronto
