= 1730 in poetry =

List of years in poetry	(table)
- … 1720; 1721; 1722; 1723; 1724; 1725; 1726; 1727; 1728; 1729; 1730; 1731; 1732; 1733; 1734; 1735; 1736; 1737; 1738; 1739; 1740 …
- In literature 1727 1728 1729 1730 1731 1732 1733
- Art; Archaeology; Architecture; Literature; Music; Philosophy; Science; +...

Nationality words link to articles with information on the nation's poetry or literature (for instance, Irish or France).

== Events ==
- Colley Cibber made British Poet Laureate

== Works published ==
=== English, Colonial America ===
- Ebenezer Cooke (attributed; also spelled "Cook"), Sotweed Redivivus, or, The Planters Looking-Glass by E. C. Gent, a verse treatise on tobacco cultivation and the problems of the planters of Maryland; thought to be by the author of The Sot-Weed Factor 1708, although the two pieces differ widely in tone, English Colonial America The idea for the 1960 novel The Sot-Weed Factor by John Barth was based on Barth's reading of Cooke's poem
- Richard Lewis, "A Journey from Patapsco to Annapolis, April 4, 1730", called one of the best nature poems in English Colonial American literature

=== United Kingdom ===
- John Banks, The Weaver's Miscellany
- Stephen Duck, Poems on Several Subjects (including "The Thresher's Labour")
- Walter Harte, Essay on Satire, criticism in verse
- Aaron Hill, The Progress of Wit
- George Lyttelton, 1st Baron Lyttelton, An Epistle to Mr. Pope, published anonymously
- Matthew Pilkington, Poems on Several Occasions
- Jonathan Swift, A Libel on D---- D--------, and a Certain Great Lord, published anonymously; a satire on Patrick Delany's Epistle to His Excellency John Lord Carteret of 1729 [although that book states "1730"]; see also An Epistle Upon an Epistle 1729)
- Elizabeth Thomas, The Metamorphosis of the Town; or, A View of the Present Fashions, published anonymously* "Scriblerus Tertius" a pen name, possibly of Thomas Cooke, The Candidates for the Bays
- James Thomson, The Seasons, a Hymn, A Poem to the Memory of Sir Isaac Newton, and Britannia, a Poem, including "Autumn" (see also Winter 1726, Summer 1727, Spring 1728)
- "Scriblerus Tertius" a pen name, possibly of Thomas Cooke, The Candidates for the Bays
- Edward Young, Two Epistles to Mr. Pope, published anonymously

=== Other ===
- Johann Christoph Gottsched, Versuch einer kritischen Dichtkunst für die Deutschen ("Critical Essay on German Poetry"), the first systematic treatise in German on the art of poetry from the standpoint of Nicolas Boileau-Despréaux

== Births ==
Death years link to the corresponding "[year] in poetry" article:

- January 9 – John Scott of Amwell (died 1783), English Quaker poet and friend of Samuel Johnson
- March 27 – Thomas Tyrwhitt (died 1786) English classical scholar and critic
- April 1 – Solomon Gessner (died 1788), Swiss painter and German-language poet
- June 21 – Motoori Norinaga 本居宣長 (died 1801), Japanese Edo period scholar of Kokugaku, physician and poet (surname: Motoori)
- November 10 – Oliver Goldsmith (died 1774), Anglo-Irish writer, poet, and physician
- Also:
  - Charlotte Lennox (died 1804), British writer and poet (born in Gibraltar to Scottish and Irish parents)
  - Tarikonda Venkamamba (died 1817), Telugu poet (a woman)
  - year uncertain – Lucy Terry (died 1821), born in Africa, enslaved at age 5, first known African American poet, author of "Bars Fight, August 28, 1746", a ballad first printed in 1855

== Deaths ==
Birth years link to the corresponding "[year] in poetry" article:

- July 16 – Elijah Fenton (born 1683), English poet
- September 27 – Laurence Eusden (born 1688), English Poet Laureate
- December 14 – Sophia Elisabet Brenner (born 1659), Swedish writer, poet, feminist and salon hostess
- unknown date:
  - Nedîm (born 1681), Ottoman poet
  - Vemana (born 1652), Telugu poet

== See also ==
- Poetry
- List of years in poetry
- List of years in literature
- 18th century in poetry
- 18th century in literature
- Augustan poetry
- Scriblerus Club

== Notes ==
- "A Timeline of English Poetry" Web page of the Representative Poetry Online Web site, University of Toronto
