= 1727 in poetry =

List of years in poetry	(table)
- … 1717; 1718; 1719; 1720; 1721; 1722; 1723; 1724; 1725; 1726; 1727; 1728; 1729; 1730; 1731; 1732; 1733; 1734; 1735; 1736; 1737 …
- In literature 1724 1725 1726 1727 1728 1729 1730
- Art; Archaeology; Architecture; Literature; Music; Philosophy; Science; +...

Nationality words link to articles with information on the nation's poetry or literature (for instance, Irish or France).

== Events ==
- Jonathan Swift revisits England this year and stays with his friend Alexander Pope until the visit is cut short when Swift gets word that Esther Johnson is dying. He rushes back. She survives until January 28, 1728.

== Works published ==
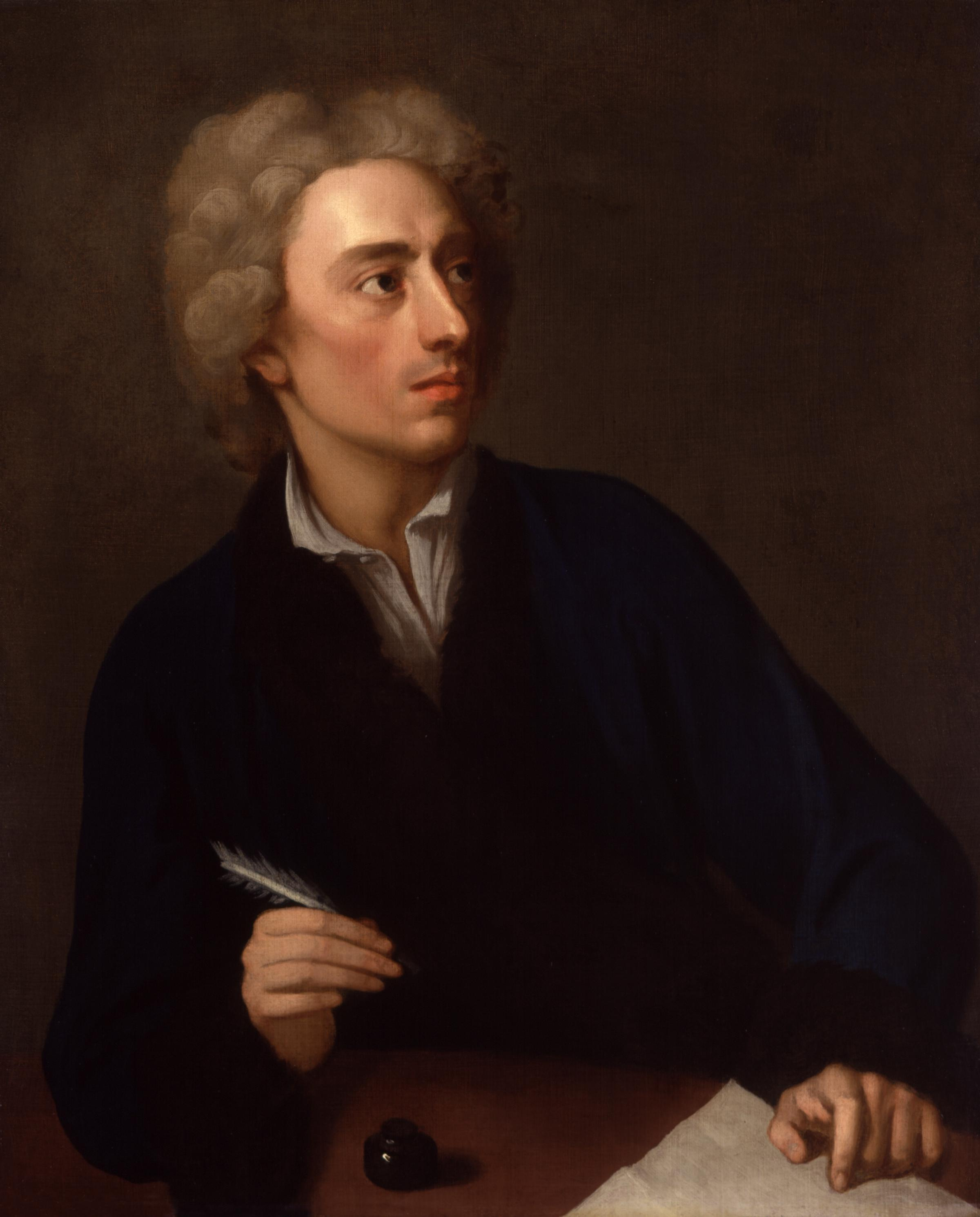
Alexander Pope, circa 1727

- Anonymous, Several Copies of Verses on Occasion of Mr. Gulliver's Travels, often attributed to Alexander Pope, but perhaps composed by Pope as well as John Gay and John Arbuthnot
- Henry Baker, The Universe, a Poem intended to restrain the Pride of Man
- Elizabeth Boyd, writing under the pen name, "Louisa", Variety
- Mather Byles, "A Poem on the Death of His Late Majesty King George, of Glorious Memory, and the Accession of Our Present Sovereign, King George II, to the British Throne", the author's first published poem, he wrote formal, neoclassical verse influenced by Alexander Pope; Colonial America
- John Dyer, Grongar Hill, Dyer's first published work originally appeared in Richard Savage's Miscellany in 1726, written in Pindaric style; this year Dyer rewrote it as a 150-line piece in four-stress octosyllabics and had it printed, after which it received much acclaim
- John Gay, Fables, I, to be followed by II in 1738, but completed only in 1750
- Miscellanies in Prose and Verse, two volumes published this year, an anthology including prose and verse by Alexander Pope, Jonathan Swift, John Gay and John Arbuthnot (Last Volume 1728 [although that edition states "1727"], The Third Volume [actually the fourth] 1732, Volume the Fifth 1735 with no content by Pope)
- Christopher Pitt, Poems and Translations
- James Ralph, The Tempest; or, The Terror of Death
- Alexander Pope:
  - Peri Bathous, Or the Art of Sinking in Poetry, a parody of Longinus's treatise on the sublime
  - (see also Several Copies [...] by Anonymous, above)
- James Thomson:
  - A Poem Sacred to the Memory of Sir Isaac Newton (who died March 20 of this year)
  - Summer (see also Winter 1726, Spring 1728, The Seasons 1730)
- John Wright, Spiritual Songs for Children

== Births ==
Death years link to the corresponding "[year] in poetry" article:

- September 7 – William Smith (died 1803), Scottish colonial American educator, theologian, poet and historian
- September 13 – Johann Friedrich Löwen (died 1771), German poet, intellectual and theatrical theorist and at one time a confidant of Gotthold Ephraim Lessing
- September 14 – Mercy Otis Warren (died 1814), American playwright, poet and historian
- Also:
  - year uncertain – Thomas Cole (died 1796), English
  - Johann Joachim Ewald (nothing known of his life after 1762), German

== Deaths ==
Birth years link to the corresponding "[year] in poetry" article:

- July 10 – William Pattison (born 1706), English erotic poet, of smallpox
- August 24 – John Reynolds (born 1668), English Presbyterian minister and religious writer
- Elizabeth, Lady Wardlaw (born 1677), Scottish ballad writer

== See also ==
- Poetry
- List of years in poetry
- List of years in literature
- 18th century in poetry
- 18th century in literature
- Augustan poetry
- Scriblerus Club

== Notes ==
- "A Timeline of English Poetry" Web page of the Representative Poetry Online Web site, University of Toronto
