= 1734 in poetry =

| List of years in poetry | (table) |
- … 1724; 1725; 1726; 1727; 1728; 1729; 1730; 1731; 1732; 1733; 1734; 1735; 1736; 1737; 1738; 1739; 1740; 1741; 1742; 1743; 1744 …
- In literature 1731 1732 1733 1734 1735 1736 1737
- Art; Archaeology; Architecture; Literature; Music; Philosophy; Science; +...

Nationality words link to articles with information on the nation's poetry or literature (for instance, Irish or France).

== Works published ==
=== United Kingdom ===
- Anonymous, A Rap at the Rhapsody (a response to Jonathan Swift's On Poetry 1733)
- Jean Adam, Miscellany Poems
- John Arbuthnot and others, Gnothi Seauton: Know Yourself, published anonymously
- Mary Barber, Poems on Several Occasions
- Isaac Hawkins Browne, the elder, On Design and Beauty, published anonymously
- Robert Dodsley, An Epistle to Mr. Pope
- Stephen Duck, Truth and Falsehood
- William Dunkin:
  - The Lover's Web
  - The Poet's Prayer
- Richard Lewis (poet), Upon Prince Madoc's Expedition to the Country now called America, in the 12th Century, a fictional, poetic tale of a Welshman; English Colonial America
- Lady Mary Wortley Montagu, The Dean's Provocation for Writing the Lady's Dressing-Room, published anonymously (see Jonathan Swift's The Lady's Dressing-Room 1732)
- Alexander Pope:
  - An Epistle to Lord Cobham, published this year, although the book states "1733"
  - An Essay on Man, fourth and final epistle (Epistles 1–3 published 1733; all four epistles also published together this year), published anonymously
  - The First Satire of the Second Book of Horace including the Second Satire of the Second Book of Horace, which was published separately this year (preceded by First Satire of Horace 1733)
  - Sober Advice From Horace, published anonymously, parallel texts in English and Latin
- James Thomson, Liberty, dedicated to the Prince of Wales
- Jonathan Swift, A Beautiful Young Nymph Going to Bed, published anonymously
- Robert Tatersal, The Bricklayer's Miscellany; or, Poems on Several Subjects
- Joseph Trapp, Thoughts Upon the Four Last Things, published anonymously, in four parts (Death, Judgment, Heaven, Hell), starting this year and ending in 1735

=== Other ===
- Jean-Baptiste Gresset, Vert-Vert, (some sources give the year of publication as 1733) France

== Births ==
Death years link to the corresponding "[year] in poetry" article:

- April 10 – Eleonore von Grothaus (died 1794), German poet
- July 15 – Evan Lloyd (died 1776), Welsh satirical poet
- July 25 – Ueda Akinari, 上田 秋成, also known as "Ueda Shūsei" (died 1809), Japanese author, scholar and waka poet (surname: Udea)
- September 29 – William Julius Mickle (died 1788), Scottish poet
- December 15 – John Maclaurin (died 1796), Scottish judge and poet
- December 21 – Francisco Manoel de Nascimento (died 1819), Portuguese poet
- Also – Hedvig Sirenia (died 1795), Swedish woman poet and translator (died 1795)

== Deaths ==
Birth years link to the corresponding "[year] in poetry" article:

- February 28 (or 1733) – John Morgan (born 1688), Welsh-born clergyman, scholar and poet
- Edward Littleton, English clergyman and poet

== See also ==
- Poetry
- List of years in poetry
- List of years in literature
- 18th century in poetry
- 18th century in literature
- Augustan poetry
- Scriblerus Club

== Notes ==
- "A Timeline of English Poetry" Web page of the Representative Poetry Online Web site, University of Toronto
