= 1735 in literature =

List of years in literature	(table)
- … 1725; 1726; 1727; 1728; 1729; 1730; 1731; 1732; 1733; 1734; 1735; 1736; 1737; 1738; 1739; 1740; 1741; 1742; 1743; 1744; 1745 …
- In poetry 1732 1733 1734 1735 1736 1737 1738
- Art; Archaeology; Architecture; Literature; Music; Philosophy; Science; +...

This article contains information about the literary events and publications of 1735.

== Events ==
- May 10 – Charles Macklin unintentionally kills another actor, Thomas Hallam, during a fight at Drury Lane Theatre, in front of witnesses; Macklin is later convicted of manslaughter.
- August 4 – A jury finds John Peter Zenger not guilty of seditious libel in The New York Weekly Journal.
- September 3 – Samuel Johnson marries Elizabeth "Tetty" Porter, twenty years his senior, at St Werburgh's Church, Derby.
- Jesuit scholar Jean-Baptiste Du Halde publishes Description Géographique, Historique, Chronologique, Politique et Physique de l'Empire de la Chine et de la Tartarie Chinois in Paris, including Father Joseph Henri Marie de Prémare's translation of The Orphan of Zhao ("L'Orphelin de la Maison de Tchao"; 13th century), the first Chinese play to have been published in any European language.
- The Sublime Society of Beef Steaks is established by John Rich at the Theatre Royal, Covent Garden, London, as a dining club mainly for literary men.

== New books ==
=== Prose ===
- Anonymous (attributed to Eliza Haywood – The Dramatic Historiographer
- John Atkins – A Voyage to Guinea, Brazil, and the West Indies
- George Berkeley – The Querist
- Jane Brereton – Merlin
- Henry Brooke – Universal Beauty
- Robert Dodsley – Beauty
- Jean-Baptiste Du Halde – Geographical, Historical, Chronological, Political, and Physical Description of the Empire of China and Chinese Tartary
- Benjamin Hoadly – A Plain Account of the Nature and End of the Sacrament of the Lord's-Supper
- Hildebrand Jacob – Works
- Samuel Johnson – A Voyage to Abyssinia
- Carl Linnaeus – Systema Naturae
- George Lyttelton, 1st Baron Lyttelton – Letters from a Persian in England
- Benoît de Maillet – Description de l'Egypte
- William Melmoth – Of Active and Retired Life
- John Oldmixon – The History of England, during the Reigns of William and Mary, Anne, George I
- Alexander Pope
  - An Epistle from Mr. Pope to Dr. Arbuthnot (just after Arbuthnot's death)
  - Of the Characters of Women (Moral Epistle II)
  - The Works of Mr. Alexander Pope
  - Letters of Mr. Pope, and Several Eminent Persons (a piracy by Edmund Curll, with forgeries included)
  - Mr. Pope's Literary Correspondence for Thirty Years, 1704 to 1734 (authorized)
- Antoine François Prévost – Le Doyen de Killerine
- Samuel Richardson – A Seasonable Examination of the Pleas and Pretensions of the Proprietors of, and Subscribers to, Play-Houses
- Henry St John, 1st Viscount Bolingbroke – A Dissertation upon Parties
- William Somervile – The Chace
- Jonathan Swift, Pope, Arbuthnot, et al.
  - Miscellanies in Prose and Verse: Volume the Fifth
  - Works
- Claudine Guérin de Tencin – Mémoires du comte de Comminge (Memoirs of the Count of Comminge)
- Diego de Torres Villarroel – Conquista del reino de Nápoles por su rey don Carlos de Borbón

=== Drama ===
- Anonymous – Squire Bassinghall
- Henry Carey – The Honest Yorkshireman
- Charlotte Charke – The Art of Management
- Charles Coffey – The Merry Cobbler
- Robert Dodsley – The Toyshop
- Robert Fabian – Trick for Trick
- Henry Fielding
  - An Old Man Taught Wisdom
  - The Universal Gallant
- Aaron Hill (adapted from Voltaire) – Zara
- George Lillo – The Christian Hero
- James Miller – The Man of Taste
- William Popple – The Double Deceit
- James Worsdale – A Cure for a Scold (a farcical ballad opera adaptation of John Lacy's Sauny the Scot, itself an adaptation of The Taming of the Shrew)

=== Poetry ===
- John Hughes – Poems on several occasions : With some select essays in prose
- Hildebrand Jacob – Brutus the Trojan
- Richard Savage – The Progress of a Divine
- James Thomson
  - Ancient and Modern Italy Compared
  - Greece
  - Rome

== Births ==
- January 31 – Jean de Crèvecoeur, French-American writer (died 1813)
- May 23 – Charles Joseph, Prince de Ligne, Netherland soldier and writer (died 1814)
- July 5 – August Ludwig von Schlözer, German historian (died 1809)
- October 25 – James Beattie, Scottish poet and moralist (died 1803)
- Unknown date – Anna Hammar-Rosén, Swedish newspaper editor (died 1805)

== Deaths ==
- February 27 – John Arbuthnot, British satirist and polymath (born 1667)
- April 23 – Edward Hawarden, English controversialist and theologian (born 1662)
- April 25 – Samuel Wesley, English clergyman and poet (born 1662)
- June 10 – Thomas Hearne, English antiquary and diarist (born 1678)
- July 16 – Cassandra Willoughby, Duchess of Chandos, English historian and travel writer (born 1670)
