= 1732 in literature =

List of years in literature	(table)
- … 1722; 1723; 1724; 1725; 1726; 1727; 1728; 1729; 1730; 1731; 1732; 1733; 1734; 1735; 1736; 1737; 1738; 1739; 1740; 1741; 1742 …
- In poetry 1729 1730 1731 1732 1733 1734 1735
- Art; Archaeology; Architecture; Literature; Music; Philosophy; Science; +...

This article contains information about the literary events and publications of 1732.

== Events ==
- April – The London Magazine is founded in opposition to the pro-Tory Gentlemen's Magazine.
- December 7 – The original Theatre Royal, Covent Garden, London (predecessor of the Royal Opera House) is opened by John Rich with a revival of William Congreve's The Way of the World.
- December 13 – The first issue of Then Swänska Argus, by Olof von Dalin, is published in Sweden, introducing the "younger new Swedish" (yngre nysvenska) literary language.
- December 28 – The first edition of Poor Richard's Almanack, by Benjamin Franklin, is published in America.
- unknown date – Trinity College Library in Dublin, designed by Thomas Burgh, is completed.

== New books ==
=== Prose ===
- George Berkeley – Alciphron
- Johann Jakob Bodmer – translation of John Milton's Paradise Lost into German prose
- Elizabeth Boyd – The Happy-Unfortunate
- Mary Davys – The False Friend (fiction)
- Philip Doddridge – Sermons on the Religious Education of Children
- Robert Dodsley – A Muse in Livery
- George Granville, Lord Lansdowne – The Genuine Works
- Thomas-Simon Gueullette – Les Sultanes de Guzarate, contes mogols (Mogul Tales; or, the Dreams of Men Awake)
- John Horsley – Britannia Romana, or The Roman Antiquities of Britain
- William King – The Toast
- Alain-René Lesage – Les avantures de monsieur Robert Chevalier, dit de Beauchêne, capitaine de flibustiers dans la Nouvelle-France (The Adventures of Robert Chevalier, Call'd de Beauchene, Captain of a Privateer in New-France)
- George Lyttelton, 1st Baron Lyttelton – The Progress of Love
- Daniel Neal – The History of the Puritans or Protestant Non-Conformists
- Richard Savage – An Epistle to the Right Honourable Sir Robert Walpole
- Philip Skippon – An Account of a Journey Made Thro ̓ Part of the Low-Countries, Germany, Italy, and France
- Jonathan Swift
  - The Lady's Dressing Room
  - The Grand Question Debated
  - (with Pope and others) Miscellanies: The Third Volume
- Isaac Watts – A Short View of the Whole Scripture History
- Leonard Welsted – Of Dulness and Scandal (answer to The Dunciad)
- Gilbert West – Stowe
- Martín Sarmiento – Demostración apologética

=== Drama ===
- Henry Carey
  - Amelia (opera)
  - The Disappointment
  - Terminta
- Henry Fielding
  - The Lottery
  - The Modern Husband
  - The Covent-Garden Tragedy
  - The Old Debauchees
  - The Mock Doctor (performed)
- John Gay (with Alexander Pope) – Acis and Galatea (opera by Handel)
- Charles Johnson – Caelia
- John Kelly – The Married Philosopher
- Pierre de Marivaux – The Triumph of Love (Le Triomphe de l'amour)
- James Miller – The Modish Couple
- Voltaire – Zaïre

=== Poetry ===
- Heyat Mahmud – Sarbabhedbāṇī; Bengali
- John Milton – Milton's Paradise Lost, edited by Richard Bentley

== Births ==
- January 6 – Matija Antun Relković, Croatian grammarian and poet (died 1798)
- January 24 – Pierre de Beaumarchais, French writer (died 1799)
- February – Charles Churchill, English satirist and poet (died 1764)
- February 19 – Richard Cumberland, English dramatist (died 1811)
- April – George Colman the Elder, English dramatist and essayist (died 1794)
- August 24 – Peter Ernst Wilde, German physician, journalist and printer (died 1785)
- September 29 – Samuel Musgrave, English classical scholar and pamphleteer (died 1780)

== Deaths ==
- February 13 – Charles-René d'Hozier, French historian (born 1640)
- February 22 – Bishop Francis Atterbury, English politician and writer (born 1663)
- March 20 – Johann Ernst Hanxleden, German poet and lexicographer (born 1681)
- March 29 (buried) – Jane Barker, English dramatist and poet (born 1652)
- May 9 – Samuel Palmer, English printer (year of birth unknown)
- July 3 (buried) – Mary Davys, Irish poet and dramatist (born 1674)
- December 2 – Constantia Grierson, Irish poet and classical scholar (born c. 1705)
- December 4 – John Gay, English poet and dramatist (born 1685)
- December 22 – Joseph Thurston, English poet (born 1704)
