= 1670 in literature =

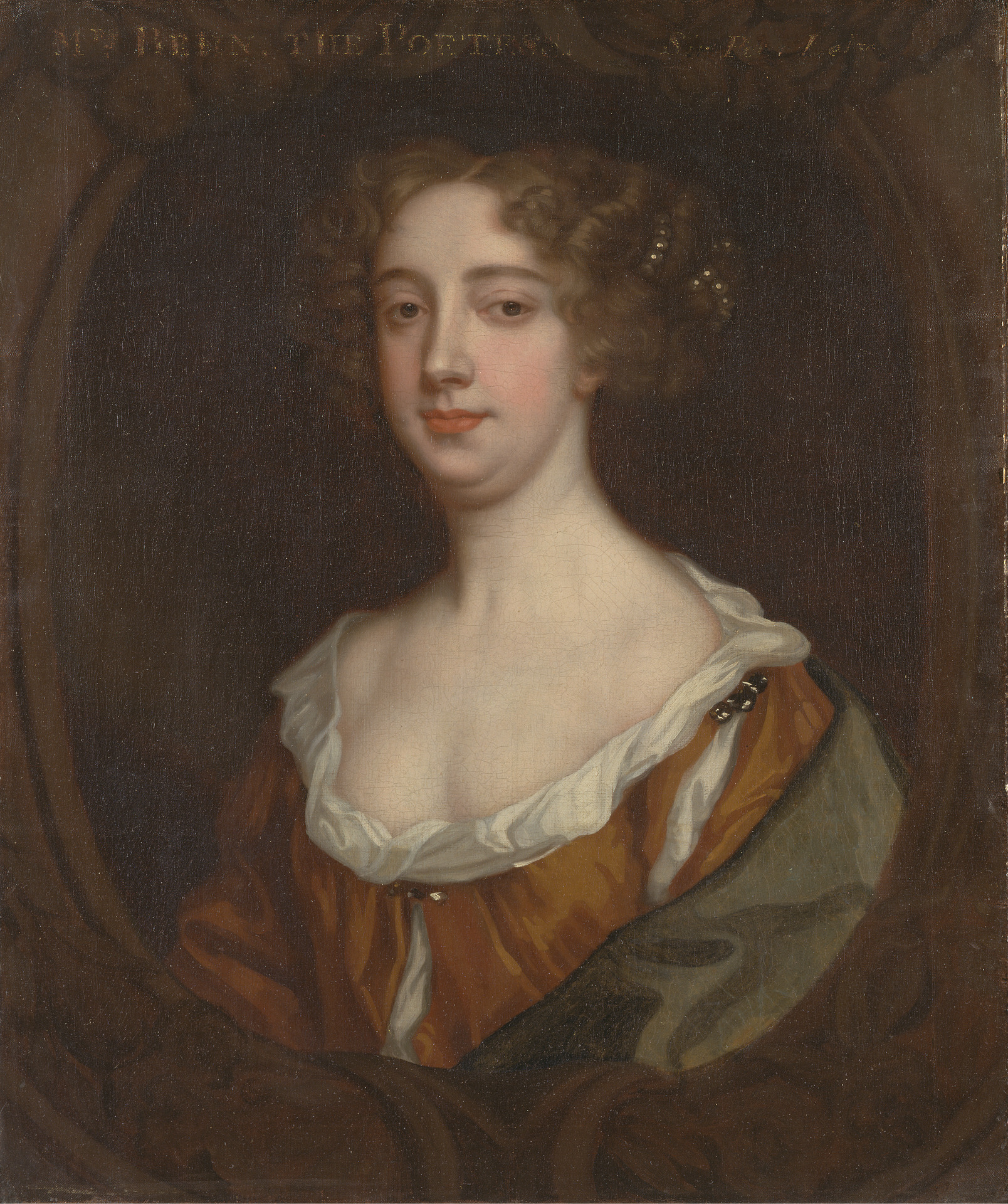
Aphra Behn painted by Peter Lely, c. 1670

This article contains information about the literary events and publications of 1670.

Il y a plus de quarante ans que je dis de la prose sans que j'en susse rien. (For more than forty years I've been speaking prose without knowing anything about it) – Monsieur Jourdain, Le Bourgeois gentilhomme

== Events ==
- January – Françoise-Marguerite, daughter of Marie de Rabutin-Chantal, marquise de Sévigné, marries the Comte de Grignan.
- August 18 – John Dryden is appointed historiographer royal in England.
- September 20 – Mrs Aphra Behn's first play, The Forced Marriage, is produced at the Lincoln's Inn Fields Theatre in London by the Duke's Company, with Thomas Betterton in the lead.
- October 14 – The première of Molière's comedy Le Bourgeois gentilhomme is performed by his troupe with himself in the title rôle, before the French royal court at the Château de Chambord, with incidental music by Jean-Baptiste Lully.
- November 21 – The première of Racine's tragedy Berenice takes place with the Comédiens du Roi at the Hôtel de Bourgogne in Paris.
- unknown date – Julian of Norwich's Revelations of Divine Love, the earliest known surviving book in English by a woman (written in the late 14th century) is printed for the first time, in an edition by Serenus de Cressy.

== New books ==
=== Prose ===
- María de Ágreda – Mística ciudad de Dios y vida de la Virgen manifestada por ella misma
- Charles Cotton – Voyage to Ireland in Burlesque
- Diego de Saavedra Fajardo – República literaria
- Madame de La Fayette – Zayde
- Fulke Greville – The Remains of Sir Fulke Greville Lord Brooke
- Hans Jakob Christoffel von Grimmelshausen – Die Ertzbetrügerin and Landstörtzerin Courasche and Der seltsame Springinsfeld
- Honcho Tsugan (Japanese classic text)
- Pierre Daniel Huet – Traitté de l'origine des romans (Treatise on the Origin of Novels)
- Edward Hyde, 1st Earl of Clarendon – The History of the Rebellion and Civil Wars in England
- Julian of Norwich – Revelations of Divine Love
- Gilles Ménage – Dictionnaire étymologique (2nd edition)
- Juan de Palafox y Mendoza – Historia de la conquista de la China por el Tartaro (History of the Conquest of China by the Tartars)
- John Milton – The History of Britain
- Blaise Pascal – Pensées (posthumously published)
- William Penn – The Great Cause of Liberty of Conscience
- John Ray – English Proverbs
- Baruch Spinoza – Tractatus Theologico-Politicus
- Thomas Tenison – The Creed of Mr. Hobbes Examined
- Izaak Walton – Life of George Herbert
- Leonard Willan – The Exact Politician, or Complete Statesman
- Hannah Woolley – The Queen-Like Closet

=== Drama ===
- Aphra Behn – The Forced Marriage
- Thomas Betterton – The Amorous Widow, or the Wanton Wife (adapted from Molière)
- John Caryll – Sir Salomon, or the Cautious Coxcomb
- Edward Howard – The Women's Conquest
- Molière – Le Bourgeois Gentilhomme
- Jean Racine – Bérénice
- Juan Bautista Diamante – Parte I de comedias

=== Poetry ===
- Francisco de Quevedo (ed. Pedro de Alderete) – Las tres musas últimas castellanas

== Births ==
- January 2 – Thomas Yalden, English poet, translator and clergyman (died 1736)
- January 24 – William Congreve, English dramatist (died 1729)
- April 23 – Cassandra Willoughby, Duchess of Chandos, English historian and travel writer (died 1735)
- October 26 – Johann Joachim Lange, German Protestant theologian and philosopher (died 1744)
- November 15 – Bernard Mandeville, Dutch-born English satirist and philosopher (died 1733)
- November 30 – John Toland, Irish controversialist (died 1722)
- December 21 – Jean-Baptiste Dubos (l'Abbé Du Bos), French historian (died 1742)
- unknown date – Laurence Echard, English historian (died 1730)
- probable – Richard Laughton, natural philosopher (died 1723)

== Deaths ==
- February 17 – Elizabeth Barnard, granddaughter of William Shakespeare (born 1608)
- March 10 – Ludovicus a S. Carolo, French Carmelite scholar, writer and bibliographer (born 1608)
- March 31 – Jacob Westerbaen, Dutch poet (born 1599)
- May 19 – Ferdinando Ughelli, Italian church historian (born 1595)
- June 14 – François Annat, French Jesuit theologian (born 1590)
- June 17 – Henry Oxenden, poet (born 1609)
- August 7 – Ignacio de Arbieto, Peruvian philosopher and historian (born 1585)
- September 11 – Žygimantas Liauksminas, Lithuanian theologian, philosopher and musicologist (born 1596/97)
- October 27 – Vavasor Powell, Welsh Puritan writer and preacher (born 1617)
- November 15 – John Amos Comenius (Jan Amos Komenský), Czech teacher and author (born 1592)
- December – John Sparrow, translator (born 1615)
- December 11 – Thomas Adams, English scholar and theologian (born 1633)
