= 1734 in literature =

List of years in literature	(table)
- … 1724; 1725; 1726; 1727; 1728; 1729; 1730; 1731; 1732; 1733; 1734; 1735; 1736; 1737; 1738; 1739; 1740; 1741; 1742; 1743; 1744 …
- In poetry 1731 1732 1733 1734 1735 1736 1737
- Art; Archaeology; Architecture; Literature; Music; Philosophy; Science; +...

This article is a summary of the major literary events and publications of 1734.

== Events ==
- January – Le Cabinet du Philosophe, a new periodical by Pierre de Marivaux, is unsuccessfully launched; it is discontinued in April.
- June 10 – Copies of Voltaire's Lettres philosophiques sur les Anglais (Letters on the English) are burned, and a warrant is issued for the author's arrest.
- November – George Faulkner begins publication of an edition of Jonathan Swift's Works in Dublin with a corrected text.
- Manoel da Assumpcam begins writing his grammar of the Bengali language.
- Göttingen State and University Library is established.

== New books ==
=== Fiction ===
- Pierre de Marivaux – Le Paysan parvenu (The Fortunate Peasant) part one

=== Drama ===
- Henry Carey, as "Benjamin Bounce" – Chrononhotonthologos (satire on bombastic tragedy)
- William Duncombe – Junius Brutus
- Henry Fielding
  - Don Quixote in England
  - The Intriguing Chambermaid
- Carlo Goldoni – Belisario
- John Hewitt – Fatal Falsehood
- James Miller – The Mother-in-Law (adapted from Molière's Le Malade imaginaire and Monsieur de Pourceaugnac)
- William Popple – The Lady's Revenge
- James Ralph – The Cornish Squire
- António José da Silva – Esopaida
- James Thomson – The Tragedy of Sophonisba

=== Poetry ===
- Jean Adam – Miscellany Poems
- Mary Barber – Poems
- Stephen Duck – Truth and Falsehood
- William Dunkin
  - The Lover's Web
  - The Poet's Prayer
- Alexander Pope
  - Essay on Man
  - An Epistle to Lord Cobham ("Moral Epistle I")
  - The First Satire of the Second Book of Horace
  - Sober Advice from Horace
- Jonathan Swift – A Beautiful Young Nymph Going to Bed

=== Non-fiction ===
- Anonymous – A Rap at the Rhapsody (on Swift's 1733 On Poetry)
- Joseph Addison (died 1719) – A Discourse on Antient and Modern Learning
- John Arbuthnot – Gnothi Seauton: Know Yourself
- Francis Atterbury – Sermons
- George Berkeley – The Analyst
- Henry Brooke – Design and Beauty: an Epistle
- Isaac Hawkins Browne – On Design and Beauty
- Dimitrie Cantemir – History of the Growth and Decay of the Ottoman Empire (first publication)
- Robert Dodsley – An Epistle to Mr. Pope
- John Jortin – Remarks on Spenser's Poems
- Lady Mary Wortley Montagu – The Dean's Provocation for Writing the Lady's Dressing-Room (on Swift's "The Lady's Dressing Room")
- Karl Ludwig von Pöllnitz – Mémoires
- Jonathan Richardson – Explanatory Notes on Milton's Paradise Lost
- George Sale – The Koran
- Emanuel Swedenborg
  - First Principles of Natural Things
  - Opera philosophica et mineralia
  - The Infinite and the Final Cause of Creation
- Joseph Trapp – Thoughts Upon the Four Last Things ("Death, Judgment, Heaven, Hell")
- Voltaire – Lettres anglaises

== Births ==
- January 10 – Fleury Mesplet, French-born Canadian writer and newspaper publisher (died 1794
- July 25 – Ueda Akinari, Japanese poet and novelist (died 1809)
- October 23 – Nicolas-Edme Rétif, French novelist (died 1806)
- December 31 – Claude Joseph Dorat (Le Chevalier Dorat), French writer (died 1780)
- Unknown dates
  - Catharina Ahlgren, Swedish writer (died 1800)
  - Robert Aitken, Scottish-born American printer and publisher (died 1802)

== Deaths ==
- January 6 – John Dennis, English dramatist and critic (born 1658)
- February 24 – Marie-Jeanne L'Héritier, French writer of fairy tales and salonnière (born 1664)
- March 1 – Roger North, English biographer and lawyer (born 1653)
- April 25 – Johann Konrad Dippel, German theologian (born 1673)
- May – Richard Cantillon, Irish-born French economist (born 1680)
- September 17 – Thomas Fuller, English man of letters and proverb collector (born 1654)
- October – Thomas Lloyd, Welsh lexicographer (born c. 1673)
- October 18 – James Moore Smythe, English dramatist and fop (born 1702)
