= 1735 in poetry =

| List of years in poetry | (table) |
- … 1725; 1726; 1727; 1728; 1729; 1730; 1731; 1732; 1733; 1734; 1735; 1736; 1737; 1738; 1739; 1740; 1741; 1742; 1743; 1744; 1745 …
- In literature 1732 1733 1734 1735 1736 1737 1738
- Art; Archaeology; Architecture; Literature; Music; Philosophy; Science; +...

Nationality words link to articles with information on the nation's poetry or literature (for instance, Irish or France).

== Events ==
- Alexander Pope acknowledges authorship of An Essay on Man.

== Works published ==
=== English Colonial America ===
- James Logan, ' 'Cato's Moral Distichs' ', a verse translation, printed by Benjamin Franklin, who calls it the first translation of a classic work both created and printed in English Colonial America
- Jane Colman Turell (died 1735), Reliquiate Turellae et Lachrymae Paternal, includes letters, diary extracts, short religious essays and pious verse (see Deaths section, below; reprinted 1741 as Memoirs of the Life and Death of the Pious and Ingenious Mrs. Jane Turell)

=== United Kingdom ===
- Joseph Addison, translator, The works of Anacreon translated into English verse with notes explanatory and poetical to which are added odes, fragments, and epigrams of Sappho with the original Greek plac’d opposite to the translation by Mr. Addison, London: Printed by John Watts
- Jane Brereton, Merlin, published anonymously "By a lady"
- Henry Brooke, Universal Beauty
- Robert Dodsley, Beauty; or, The Art of Charming, published anonymously
- John Hughes, Poems on Several Occasions
- Hildebrand Jacob:
  - Brutus the Trojan, Founder of the British Empire
  - The Works of Hildebrand Jacob
- Samuel Johnson, translator, A Voyage to Abyssinia, translated from Jeronymo Lobo
- William Melmoth, the younger, Of Active and Retired Life, published anonymously
- Alexander Pope:
  - An Epistle from Mr. Pope to Dr. Arbuthnot (sometimes called "Epistle to Dr Arbuthnot"), published January 2, although the book states "1734"
  - Of the Characters of Women, the second of Pope's "Moral Essays"
  - The Works of Mr. Alexander Pope, Volume 2, works printed for the first time in this volume include "The Author to the Reader", "The Second Satire of Dr. John Donne", "On Charles Earl of Dorset", "On Mr. Elijah Fenton" (see also Works 1717, 1736, 1737)
  - Letters of Mr. Pope, and Several Eminent Persons, an unauthorized edition brought out by Curll (see Letters of Mr. Alexander Pope 1737)
  - Mr. Pope's Literary Correspondence for Thirty Years, 1704 to 1734, first three volumes published this year, called "Volume the First", etc. (see also Volume the Fourth 1736, Volume the Fifth 1737, Letters of Mr. Pope above, Letters of Mr. Alexander Pope 1737)
- Richard Savage, The Progress of a Divine
- William Somervile, The Chace
- Jonathan Swift:
  - And others, Miscellanies in Prose and Verse: Volume the Fifth, anonymous editor; an anthology; "Completes" the previous four Miscellanies volumes (see 1727, 1732)
  - The Works of Jonathan Swift, the first authorized edition
- James Thomson, Liberty, consisting of Part I: Antient and Modern Italy Compared, Part 2: Greece, Part 3: Rome (see also Part 4: Britain, and Part 5: The Prospect 1736)

=== Other ===
- Vasily Trediakovsky, Новый и краткий способъ къ сложенью российскихъ стиховъ ("A new and concise way to compose Russian verses"), a work of critical theory for which he is most remembered; it first introduced to Russian literature discussion of such poetic genres as the sonnet, the rondeau, the madrigal, and the ode

== Births ==
Death years link to the corresponding "[year] in poetry" article:

- February 3 – Ignacy Krasicki (died 1801), Enlightenment poet ("the Prince of Poets"), Poland's La Fontaine, author of the first Polish novel, playwright, journalist, encyclopedist, and translator from French and Greek
- March – John Langhorne (died 1779), English poet and clergyman best known for his work on translating Plutarch's Lives
- April 18 bapt. – James Woodhouse (died 1820), English shoemaker poet
- October 25 – James Beattie (died 1803), Scottish scholar and writer

== Deaths ==
Birth years link to the corresponding "[year] in poetry" article:

- April 5 – Samuel Wesley (born 1662), English poet and religious leader
- October 25 – Charles Mordaunt, 3rd Earl of Peterborough (born 1658), English
- Jane Turell (born 1708), English Colonial America (see "Works published" section, above), daughter of Benjamin Colman

== See also ==
- Poetry
- List of years in poetry
- List of years in literature
- 18th century in poetry
- 18th century in literature
- Augustan poetry
- Scriblerus Club

== Notes ==
- "A Timeline of English Poetry" Web page of the Representative Poetry Online Web site, University of Toronto
