= 1654 in literature =

This article contains information about the literary events and publications of 1654.

== Events ==
- July – Lady Dorothy Osborne plays the leading role in a country-house staging of Sir William Berkeley's tragicomedy The Lost Lady. While the London theatres remain closed, amateur theatricals continue at private houses in England. Like performances of courtly masques before 1642, many of these performances feature women, foreshadowing the acceptance of professional women performers in the early Restoration era.

== New books ==
=== Prose ===
- Roger Boyle, 1st Earl of Orrery – Parlhenissa, a novel
- Philippe Labbe - Bibliotheca antijanseniana
- Martino Martini – De Bello Tartarico Historia
- John Milton – Defensio Secunda
- Richard Sherlock – The Quaker's Wilde Questions objected against the Ministers of the Gospel.

=== Drama ===
- Anonymous – Alphonsus Emperor of Germany published (wrongly attributed to George Chapman)
- Cyrano de Bergerac – Le Pédant joué ("The Pedant Tricked")
- Alexander Brome – The Cunning Lovers
- Álvaro Cubillo de Aragón
  - El invisible príncipe del Baúl
  - Las muñecas de Marcela
  - El señor de Noches Buenas
- Richard Flecknoe – Love's Dominion
- Henry Glapthorne (?) – Revenge for Honour published (wrongly attributed to George Chapman)
- James Howell – The Nuptials of Peleus and Thetis (published)
- Thomas Jordan – Cupid His Coronation
- Thomas May – Two Tragedies, viz. Cleopatra and Agrippina (published)
- Robert Mead – The Combat of Love and Friendship (published)
- Agustín Moreto
  - De fuera vendrá quien de casa te echará
  - El desdén, con el desdén (first published)
- Philippe Quinault – L'Amant indiscret
- Joost van den Vondel – Lucifer
- John Webster (and Thomas Heywood?) – Appius and Virginia (published)

=== Poetry ===
- Thomas Washbourne – Divine Poems

== Births ==
- January 10 – Joshua Barnes, English scholar and fiction writer (died 1712)
- January 22 – Richard Blackmore, English poet and physician (died 1729)
- March – Anne Lefèvre (Madame Dacier), French scholar and translator (died 1720)
- March 16 – Andreas Acoluthus, German Orientalist (died 1704)
- June 24 – Thomas Fuller, English writer and physician (died 1734)
- Unknown dates
  - John Bellers, English writer and Quaker (died 1725)
  - Gerrit van Spaan, Dutch writer (died 1711)

== Deaths ==
- February 18 – Jean-Louis Guez de Balzac, French essayist (born 1697)
- February 19 – Edmund Chilmead, English writer and translator (born 1610)
- April 5 – Jacobus Trigland, Dutch theologian (born 1583)
- October – John Bastwick, English physician and controversialist (born 1593)
- November 30
  - William Habington, English poet (born 1605)
  - John Selden, English polymath (born 1584)
- December – Robert Carr, 1st Earl of Ancram, Scottish nobleman and writer (born c. 1578)
- Unknown dates
  - Walter Blith, English writer on husbandry (born 1605)
  - Edward Misselden, English mercantilist writer (born 1608)
  - Alexander Ross, Scottish controversialist (born c. 1590)
