= 1803 in poetry =

List of years in poetry	(table)
- … 1793; 1794; 1795; 1796; 1797; 1798; 1799; 1800; 1801; 1802; 1803; 1804; 1805; 1806; 1807; 1808; 1809; 1810; 1811; 1812; 1813 …
- In literature 1800 1801 1802 1803 1804 1805 1806
- Art; Archaeology; Architecture; Literature; Music; Philosophy; Science; +...

Nationality words link to articles with information on the nation's poetry or literature (for instance, Irish or France).

== Events ==
- October – First appearance of the Literary Magazine and American Register, a United States monthly published in Philadelphia and edited by Charles Brockden Brown until 1807, when it becomes a semiannual almanac, American Register, which ceases publication in 1810.
- December 31 – "Sitting on the very sheepfold, dear William (Wordsworth) read to me (Samuel Taylor Coleridge) his divine poem, 'Michael'".

== Works published ==
=== United Kingdom ===
- Peter Bayley, Poems, includes parodies of works by William Wordsworth, including "The Fisherman's Wife," a parody of "The Idiot Boy"; "The Ivy Seat" parodying the Lucy poems; "Evining in the Vale of Festinog", parodying "Tintern Abbey"; "The Forest Fay" parodies Samuel Taylor Coleridge's "The Rime of the Ancient Mariner"; London: printed for William Miller by W. Bulmer and Co.
- Sir Alexander Boswell, The Spirit of Tintoc; or, Johnny Bell and the Kelpie, published anonymously
- William Lisle Bowles, The Picture
- Thomas Campbell, Poems, includes the 7th edition of The Pleasures of Hope (1799) and new works, including "Lochiel's Warning", "Hohenlinden" and "The Soldier's Dream"
- Thomas Chatterton, The Works of Thomas Chatterton, Containing His Life, by G. Gregory, D.D., and Miscellaneous Poems, three volumes, London: printed by Briggs and Cottle, for T. N. Longman and O. Rees, posthumous
- Samuel Taylor Coleridge, Poems: Third Edition, a reprint of Poems ... Second Edition (1797) omitting poems by Charles Lamb and Lloyd London: printed by N. Biggs for T. N. Longman and O. Rees
- Erasmus Darwin, The Temple of Nature; or, The Origin of Society
- Charles Dibdin, The Professional Life of Mr. Dibdin
- Henry Kirke White, Clifton Grove

=== United States ===
- J. Warren Brackett, The Ghost of Law, or Anarchy and Despotism, A Poem, Delivered Before the Phi Beta Kappa, Dartmouth College, at Their Anniversary, August 23, 1803, Hanover, New Hampshire: printed by Moses Davis (24 pages)
- Thomas Fessenden, A Terrible Tractoration, a satire on medical quackery, vivisection, animal crossbreeding and scientific theories of some French and English naturalists, including Comte Georges Louis Leclerc de Buffon and Erasmus Darwin

=== Other ===
- C. Stanislaus Bouflers, Oeuvres ("Works"), Paris: L. Pelletier, France
- Adam Oehlenschlager, Digte ("Poems"), Denmark

== Births ==
Death years link to the corresponding "[year] in poetry" article:

- January 1 – Richard Henry Horne (died 1884), English poet and critic
- January 19 – Sarah Helen Whitman (died 1878), American poet, essayist, transcendentalist, spiritualist and a romantic interest of Edgar Allan Poe
- May 1 – James Clarence Mangan (died 1849), Irish
- May 25 – Ralph Waldo Emerson (died 1882), American essayist, philosopher, poet and leader of the Transcendentalist movement
- June 25 – Sumner Lincoln Fairfield (died 1844), American poet and teacher
- June 30 – Thomas Lovell Beddoes (died 1849) English poet and playwright
- December 3 – Robert Stephen Hawker, also known as Stephen Hawker (died 1875), English Anglican clergyman, poet, antiquarian of Cornwall and eccentric
- December 6 – Susanna Moodie (died 1855), English-born Canadian author and poet
- December 26 (December 14 O.S.) – Friedrich Reinhold Kreutzwald (died 1882), Estonian author and poet

== Deaths ==
Birth years link to the corresponding "[year] in poetry" article:

- January 18 – Ippolit Bogdanovich (born 1743), Russian classicist author of light poetry, best known for his long poem Dushenka
- February 9 – Jean François de Saint-Lambert, French poet (born 1716)
- February 18 – Johann Wilhelm Ludwig Gleim (born 1719), German poet
- March 14 – Friedrich Gottlieb Klopstock (born 1724), German poet
- May 14 – William Smith (born 1727), Scottish American Episcopalian priest, educator, theologian, poet and historian
- June 22 – Wilhelm Heinse (born 1746), German author and poet
- August 18 – James Beattie (born 1735), Scottish scholar, writer and poet
- August 25 – Johann Gottfried Herder (born 1744), German philosopher, poet and literary critic
- September 23 – Joseph Ritson (born 1752), English antiquary and anthologist
- Also – Erika Liebman (born 1738), Swedish poet and academic

== See also ==
- List of years in poetry
- List of years in literature
- 19th century in literature
- 19th century in poetry
- Romantic poetry
- Golden Age of Russian Poetry (1800–1850)
- Weimar Classicism period in Germany, commonly considered to have begun in 1788 and to have ended either in 1805, with the death of Friedrich Schiller, or 1832, with the death of Goethe
- List of poets
- Poetry

== Notes ==
- "A Timeline of English Poetry". Representative Poetry Online. University of Toronto.
