= 1811 in poetry =

| List of years in poetry | (table) |
- … 1801; 1802; 1803; 1804; 1805; 1806; 1807; 1808; 1809; 1810; 1811; 1812; 1813; 1814; 1815; 1816; 1817; 1818; 1819; 1820; 1821 …
- In literature 1808 1809 1810 1811 1812 1813 1814
- Art; Archaeology; Architecture; Literature; Music; Philosophy; Science; +...

Nationality words link to articles with information on the nation's poetry or literature (for instance, Irish or France).

== Events ==
- March 25 — The University of Oxford expels the first-year undergraduate Percy Bysshe Shelley after he and Thomas Jefferson Hogg refuse to answer questions about The Necessity of Atheism, a pamphlet they published anonymously. Earlier this year, Shelley, as "A Gentleman of the University of Oxford", published in London Poetical Essay on the Existing State of Things, containing a 172-line anti-monarchical and anti-war poem dedicated to Harriet Westbrook, a work subsequently lost until 2006.
- November 21 — German poet Heinrich von Kleist shoots his terminally-ill lover Henriette Vogel and then himself, on the shore of the Kleiner Wannsee near Potsdam.

=== Lord Byron ===
- July 14–17 — Lord Byron arrives in London after an absence from England of a little more than two years on his Continental tour.
- October 16 — Byron receives a challenge from the poet Thomas Moore who had been offended by parts of English Bards.
- November 4 — Byron meets Thomas Campbell and Moore at the home of Samuel Rogers, where the company discusses literary topics.

== Works published ==
=== United Kingdom ===
- Robert Bloomfield, The Banks of Wye
- Richard Cumberland, Retrospection
- Charles Lamb, Prince Dorus; or, Flattery Put Out of Countenance, published anonymously; for children
- Mary Russell Mitford, Christina, the Maid of the South Seas
- William Peebles, Burnomania: the celebrity of Robert Burns considered in a Discourse addressed to all real Christians of every Denomination
- Anna Maria Porter, Ballad Romances, and Other Poems
- Sir Walter Scott, The Vision of Don Roderick
- Mary Tighe, Psyche, with Other Poems
- John Wolcot, Carlton House Fete; or, The Disappointed Bard

=== United States ===
- Hugh Henry Brackenridge, An Epistle to Walter Scott, Pittsburgh: Franklin Head Printing-office
- William Cullen Bryant, Thanatopsis
- John Cole, editor, The Minstrel: A Collection of Celebrated Songs Set to Music
- Sumner Lincoln Fairfield, The Poems and Prose Writings of Sumner Lincoln Fairfield, two volumes, Philadelphia: Printed for the Proprietor
- Susanna Haswell Rowson, editor, A Present For Young Ladies; Containing Poems, Dialogues, Addresses, &c. &c. &c, As Recited by the Pupils of Mrs. Rowson's Academy, at the Annual Exhibitions, (Boston: Published by John West & Co.
- Samuel Woodworth, 1785-1842 [1811], Beasts at Law, or Zoologian Jurisprudence; A Poem, Satirical, Allegorical, and Moral, In Three Cantos, Translated from the Arabic of Sampfilius Philoerin, Z. Y. X. W. &c. &c. Whose Fables Have Made So Much Noise in the East, and Whose Fame Has Eclipsed That of Aesop. With Notes and Annotations New York: J. Harmer & Co.

=== Other ===
- Bernhard Severin Ingemann, Digte ("Poems"), Denmark

== Births ==
Death years link to the corresponding "[year] in poetry" article:

- February 1 – Arthur Hallam (died 1833), English poet, best known as the subject of In Memoriam A.H.H. a long poem by his best friend, Alfred, Lord Tennyson
- October 19 – Andreas Munch (died 1884), Norwegian poet
- date not known – Andreas Laskaratos Ανδρέας Λασκαράτος (died 1901), Greek satirical poet and writer

== Deaths ==
Birth years link to the corresponding "[year] in poetry" article:

- January 8 – Christoph Friedrich Nicolai (born 1733), German writer, publisher, critic, author of satirical novels, regional historian, and a key figure of the Enlightenment in Berlin
- March 12 – Judah Leib Ben-Ze'ev (born 1764), Galician Hebrew philologist, lexicographer, Biblical scholar and poet
- April 7 – Dositej Obradović (born 1742), Serbian author, philosopher, linguist, polyglot and the first minister of education of Serbia
- August 28 – John Leyden (born 1775), Scottish indologist and poet
- September 14 – James Grahame (born 1765), Scottish poet, lawyer and clergyman
- September 30 – Thomas Percy (born 1729), English bishop of Dromore, ballad collector and poet
- November 13 – Robert Treat Paine, Jr. (born 1773), American poet and editor; son of Robert Treat Paine, signer of the Declaration of Independence

== See also ==
- Poetry
- List of years in poetry
- List of years in literature
- 19th century in literature
- 19th century in poetry
- Romantic poetry
- Golden Age of Russian Poetry (1800–1850)
- Weimar Classicism period in Germany, commonly considered to have begun in 1788 and to have ended either in 1805, with the death of Friedrich Schiller, or 1832, with the death of Goethe
- List of poets
