= 1806 in poetry =

List of years in poetry	(table)
- … 1796; 1797; 1798; 1799; 1800; 1801; 1802; 1803; 1804; 1805; 1806; 1807; 1808; 1809; 1810; 1811; 1812; 1813; 1814; 1815; 1816 …
- In literature 1803 1804 1805 1806 1807 1808 1809
- Art; Archaeology; Architecture; Literature; Music; Philosophy; Science; +...

Nationality words link to articles with information on the nation's poetry or literature (for instance, Irish or France).

== Events ==
- Sir Roger Newdigate founds the Newdigate Prize for English Poetry at the University of Oxford. The first winner is John Wilson ("Christopher North").
- William Wordsworth completes his first revision of The Prelude: or, Growth of a Poet's Mind in 13 Books, a version started in 1805. It would be further revised later in his life. His work this year and next revised the original, two-part 1798-1799 version. The book is not published in any form until shortly after his death in 1850.
- Following publication of Irish-born poet Thomas Moore's Epistles, Odes, and Other Poems, Francis Jeffrey denounces it in the July Edinburgh Review as "licentious". Moore challenges Jeffrey to a duel in London but their confrontation is interrupted by officials and they become friends.

== Works published in English ==
=== United Kingdom ===
- Elizabeth Bath, Poems, on Various Occasions
- James Beresford, The Miseries of Human Life; or, The Groans of Timothy Testy, and Samuel Sensitive, published anonymously
- Robert Bloomfield, Wild Flowers; or, Pastoral and Local Poetry
- Lord Byron, Fugitive Pieces, including "The First Kiss of Love", published anonymously and privately printed; the author's first publication
- John Wilson Croker, The Amazoniad; or, Figure and Fashion, published anonymously
- Thomas Holcroft, Tales in Verse
- Walter Savage Landor, Simonidea
- James Montgomery, The Wanderer of Switzerland, and Other Poems
- Thomas Moore, Epistles, Odes, and Other Poems
- Thomas Love Peacock, Palmyra, and Other Poems
- Mary Robinson, The Poetical Works of the Late Mrs. Mary Robinson (posthumous)
- William Roscoe, The Butterfly's Ball and the Grasshopper's Feast, a children's classic
- Sir Walter Scott, Ballads and Lyrical Pieces
- Jane Taylor and Ann Taylor, Rhymes for the Nursery, including "Twinkle, twinkle, little star"

=== United States ===
- Hugh Henry Brackenridge, Gazette Publications By Hugh Henry Brackenridge, Carlisle: Printed by Alexander & Phillips
- Thomas Green Fessenden:
  - Democracy Unveiled, or, Tyranny Stripped of the Garb of Patriotism. By Christopher Caustic, L. L. D. &c.&c.&c.&c.&c.&c.&c.&c.&c. In Two Volumes ... Third edition, with large additions (New York: Printed for I. Riley, & Co. The most well-known poetic attack on Thomas Jefferson and other prominent Democratic Republicans; in six cantos of mock-heroic footnotes and including many footnotes
  - Original Poems, Philadelphia: Printed at the Lorenzo Press of E. Bronson
- John Blair Linn, Valerian, epic poem on the persecution of early Christians; published unfinished after Linn died of tuberculosis; with an introduction by Charles Brockden Brown, his brother-in-law
- Alexander Wilson, The Foresters, a description of nature and events during a walking trip from Philadelphia to Niagara Falls and back again

== Works published in other languages ==
- Jacques Delille, L'Imagination; France
- Nólsoyar Páll, Fuglakvæði ("Ballad of the Birds"), Faroese, completed

== Births ==
Death years link to the corresponding "[year] in poetry" article:

- January 9 – Joseph-Isidore Bédard (died 1833), Canadian poet, lawyer and politician
- January 20 – Nathaniel Parker Willis, also known as N. P. Willis, (died 1867) American author, poet and editor who worked with notable writers including Edgar Allan Poe and Henry Wadsworth Longfellow
- March 6 – Elizabeth Barrett Browning (died 1861), English
- April 17 – William Gilmore Simms (died 1870), American poet, novelist and historian
- date not known – Charles Tompson (died 1883), Australian public servant and said to be the first published Australian-born poet

== Deaths ==
Birth years link to the corresponding "[year] in poetry" article:

- February 19 – Elizabeth Carter (born 1717), English poet, classicist, writer, translator and a prominent member of the Bluestocking circle
- March 3 – Heinrich Christian Boie (born 1744), German author and poet
- May 6 – Ann Yearsley (born c. 1753), English poet and writer
- July 16 – Caterino Mazzolà (born 1745), Italian poet and librettist
- October 19 – Henry Kirke White (born 1785), English
- October 28 – Charlotte Turner Smith (born 1749), English poet and novelist
- date not known – Jupiter Hammon (born 1711), English Colonial American

== See also ==
- Poetry
- List of years in poetry
- List of years in literature
- 19th century in literature
- 19th century in poetry
- Romantic poetry
- Golden Age of Russian Poetry (1800–1850)
- Weimar Classicism period in Germany, commonly considered to have begun in 1788 and to have ended either in 1805, with the death of Friedrich Schiller, or 1832, with the death of Goethe
- List of poets

== Notes ==
- "A Timeline of English Poetry" Web page of the Representative Poetry Online Web site, University of Toronto
