= 1742 in literature =

List of years in literature	(table)
- … 1732; 1733; 1734; 1735; 1736; 1737; 1738; 1739; 1740; 1741; 1742; 1743; 1744; 1745; 1746; 1747; 1748; 1749; 1750; 1751; 1752 …
- In poetry 1739 1740 1741 1742 1743 1744 1745
- Art; Archaeology; Architecture; Literature; Music; Philosophy; Science; +...

This article contains information about the literary events and publications of 1742.

== Events ==
- February – Henry Fielding's picaresque novel Joseph Andrews appears in London as The History of the Adventures of Joseph Andrews and of his Friend Mr. Abraham Adams, written in imitation of the manner of Cervantes, author of Don Quixote. Described by Fielding as a "comic epic poem in prose", it is his first full-length novel and among the earliest in the English language. A second edition appears on June 10.
- December 2 – The Pennsylvania Journal first appears in the United States.
- December – The novelist and dramatist Pierre de Marivaux is elected to the Académie française.
- unknown dates
  - The Irish portraitist Charles Jervas' English translation of Don Quixote is published three years after his death. Through a printer's error, the translator's name is printed as "Charles Jarvis", leading to the book being known forever as the "Jarvis" translation. It is acclaimed as the most faithful English rendering of the novel up to this time.
  - The Stockholm Gazette, founded by Peter Momma, begins publication.
  - The publisher Robert Foulis acquires his own printing press in Glasgow.
  - The French typefounder Pierre Simon Fournier's Modèles des Caractères presents his system of point sizes for typography.

== New books ==
=== Fiction ===
- Claude Prosper Jolyot de Crébillon – The Sofa: A Moral Tale (Le Sopha, conte moral)
- Henry Fielding – Joseph Andrews
- Eliza Haywood – The Virtuous Villager
- Charles Jervas (translator) – Don Quixote

=== Drama ===
- Charlotte Charke – Tit for Tat
- Charles Jennens – libretto for Handel's oratorio the Messiah
- José de Cañizares – El anillo de Giges
- Ignacio de Luzán – La virtud coronada

=== Poetry ===
- William Collins – Persian Eclogues
- Thomas Cooke – Original Poems
- James Hammond – Love Elegies
- James Merrick – The Destruction of Troy
- William Shenstone – The School-Mistress
- William Somervile – Field Sports
- Charles Hanbury Williams – The Country Girl: An ode
- Edward Young – Night Thoughts

=== Non-fiction ===
- Colley Cibber – A Letter from Mr. Cibber to Mr. Pope (in re Pope's satirizing of Cibber)
- Ignacio de Luzán – Carta en defensa de España
- Philip Doddridge – Evidences of Christianity
- Pierre Simon Fournier – Modèles des Caractères
- Nathaniel Hooke – An Account of the Conduct of the Dowager Duchess of Marlborough from her first coming to Court to the year 1710
- Edmond Hoyle – A Short Treatise on the Game of Whist
- David Hume – Essays Moral and Political vol. ii
- Benito Jerónimo Feijoo – Cartas eruditas y curiosas
- Colin Maclaurin – Treatise on Fluxions
- John Oldmixon – Memoirs of the Press, Historical and Political
- Horace Walpole and Sir Charles Hanbury Williams – The Lessons for the Day (satire on William Pulteney, Bolingbroke and the "Patriot Whigs").
- William Warburton – A Critical and Philosophical Commentary on Mr. Pope's Essay on Man
- John Wesley
  - The Character of a Methodist
  - The Principles of a Methodist
- George Whitefield – Nine Sermons

== Births ==
- January 1 – Isaac Reed, English Shakespearean editor (died 1807)
- March 25 – William Combe, English writer, poet and adventurer (died 1823)
- June 25 – Johann Schweighäuser, German classical scholar (died 1830)
- September 14 – James Wilson, American pamphleteer and publisher (died 1798)
- October 6 – Johan Herman Wessel, Norwegian author (died 1785)
- unknown dates
  - Ralph Broome, English pamphleteer (died 1805)
  - Mihály Bakos (Miháo Bakoš), Slovene hymnist and Lutheran minister in Hungary (died 1803)

== Deaths ==
- March 23 – Jean-Baptiste Dubos, French author (born 1670)
- April 27 – Nicholas Amhurst, English poet and political writer (born 1697)
- July 9 – John Oldmixon, English historian (born 1673)
- July 14 – Richard Bentley, English scholar and critic (born 1662)
- July 19 – William Somervile, English poet (born 1675)
- November 24 – Andrew Bradford, American publisher (born 1686)
