= Gerrit van Spaan =

Gerrit van Spaan (1654–1711) was an 18th-century writer from the Dutch Republic.

Van Spaan was born and died in Rotterdam. In 1670 he volunteered for a sea voyage to punish Algerian pirates, which failed, but brought him inspiration for his later writing career.

== Works ==
- Gelukzoeker over zee of Afrikaansche wegwijzer, 1691
- Aziaansche wegwijzer, 1695
- Beschrijvinge der stad Rotterdam en eenige omliggende dorpen (A History of Rotterdam and some surrounding villages, 1698.
- Schermschool der huislieden, 1702
- Het koddig en vermakelijk leven van Louwtje van Zevenhuizen, 1704
