= Ignacio de Arbieto =

Ignacio de Arbieto (1585 – 7 August 1670) was a Jesuit philosopher and historian of Peru.

== Biography ==
Arbieto was born in Madrid. He joined the Jesuit Order in 1603 and was ordained as a priest in Lima, Peru, in 1612. He was appointed chair of philosophy in Quito, Ecuador, then he went to Arequipa and finally back to Lima.

He spent his final years writing "Historia del Perú y de las fundaciones que he hecho en él la Compañía de Jesús". The manuscript is in the National Archives of Lima. He died in Lima on 7 August 1670.
