= Honchō Tsugan =

Book by Hayashi Razan and Hayashi Gahō

The Honchō Tsugan (本朝通鑑), or Comprehensive Mirror of Japan, is a book on the history of Japan by Hayashi Razan and his successor Hayashi Gahō which was finished in 1670. It was written in Chinese and modeled after the Zizhi Tongjian. The whole work comprises 326 scrolls.

== Background ==
The work was finished at the Shūshikan (修史館), or Historiographic Institute, which was built for Gahō, who was also provided with enough rations (扶持 fuchi) for a research team of up to 95 men.

== Scholarship ==
The work, and Razan in particular, has been praised by Japanese scholars for its relatively dispassionate attempt at understanding history, leading some scholars to view Razan as "the founder of modern historical research" and "the beginning of modern scholarship" in Japan. The work was influential on the thought of Arai Hakuseki, who is considered to have been even more objective. Nonetheless, the work was by no means perfect, as Razan was under pressure from the times to hide his sceptical views of traditional Japanese religious myths (such as the Age of the Gods). As a result, he does not treat that subject in a critical manner as he does with other topics, and had to save his unorthodox views for private writings.
