= Álvaro Cubillo de Aragón =

Spanish playwright

Álvaro Cubillo de Aragón (c. 1596 – 1661) was a playwright of the Spanish Golden Age.
