= 1796 in poetry =

List of years in poetry	(table)
- … 1786; 1787; 1788; 1789; 1790; 1791; 1792; 1793; 1794; 1795; 1796; 1797; 1798; 1799; 1800; 1801; 1802; 1803; 1804; 1805; 1806 …
- In literature 1793 1794 1795 1796 1797 1798 1799
- Art; Archaeology; Architecture; Literature; Music; Philosophy; Science; +...

Nationality words link to articles with information on the nation's poetry or literature (for instance, Irish or France).

== Events ==
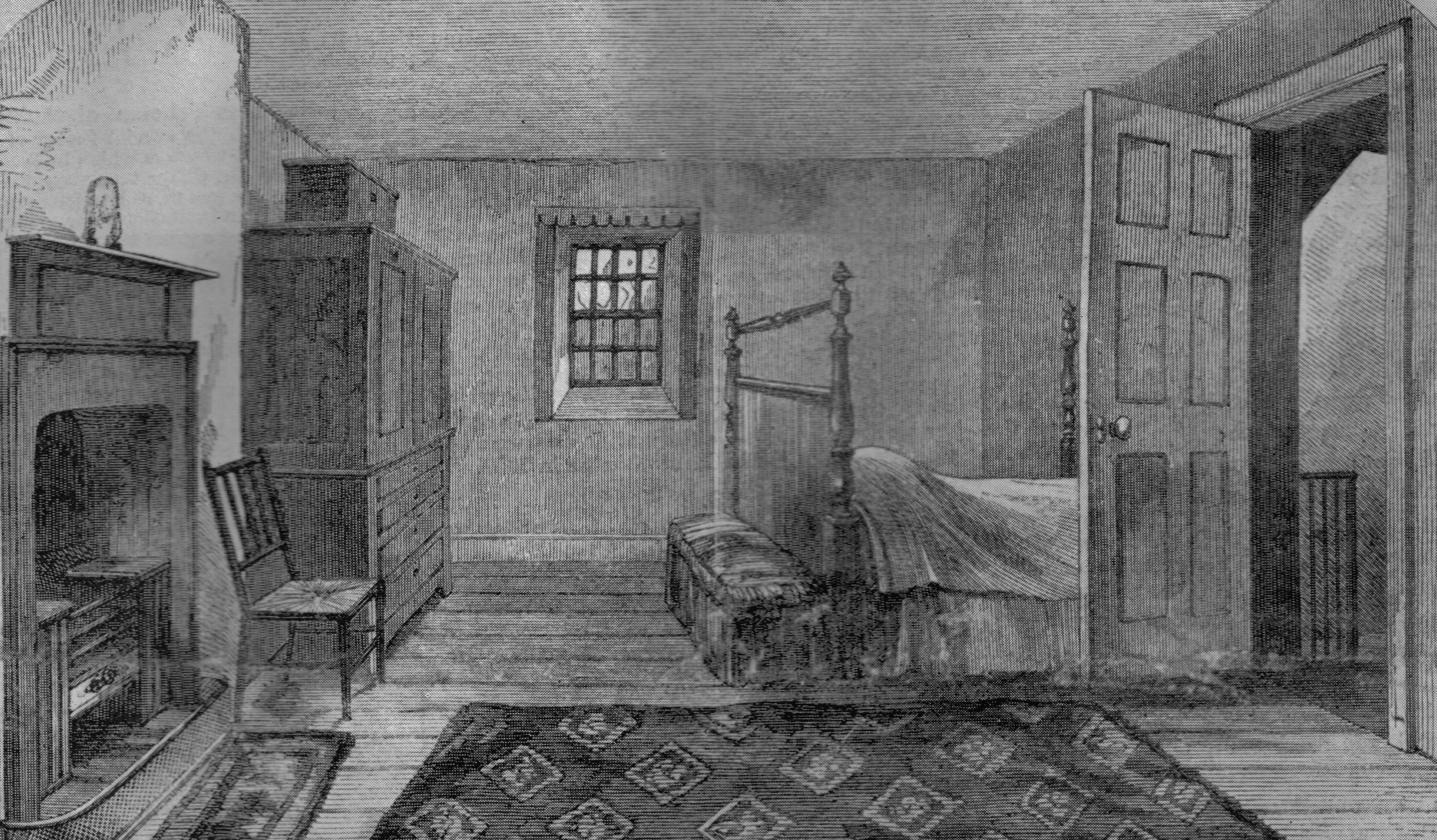
The death room of Robert Burns

- July 21 – Death of the Scottish national poet, Robert Burns ("Rabbie Burns", "Scotland's favourite son", "the Ploughman Poet", "the Bard (of Ayrshire)"), in Dumfries, at the age of 37. His funeral (with honours as a military volunteer) takes place on July 25 while his wife, Jean, is in labour with their ninth child together, Maxwell. Burns is at first buried in the far corner of St. Michael's Churchyard in Dumfries. The volume of The Scots Musical Museum published this year includes his versions of the Scots poem "Auld Lang Syne" and "Charlie Is My Darling".

== Works published in English ==
=== United Kingdom ===
- Mary Matilda Betham, Elegies, and Other Small Poems
- William Lisle Bowles, Hope
- Sir James Burges, The Birth and Triumph of Love
- Samuel Taylor Coleridge:
  - Ode on the Departing Year
  - Poems on Various Subjects including "Lines Written at Shurton Bars", the first full publication of "Religious Musings" and a revised version of "Monody on the Death of Chatterton"
- M. G. Lewis, published anonymously, Village Virtues
- Sir Walter Scott, The Chase, and William and Helen, translation (published anonymously) from the German of Gottfried August Burger's Der Wilde Jager and Lenora (See William Taylor, below)
- Robert Southey:
  - Joan of Arc

"But what good came of it at last?"
Quoth little Peterkin.
"Why that I cannot tell," said he,
"But 'twas a famous victory."

— Closing lines of After Blenheim by Robert Southey
  - Poems, partly a reprint of poems originally published in 1795 and partly new works, including "After Blenheim" (see also Poems 1799 and Minor Poems 1813)
- William Taylor, Ellenore, translation (published anonymously) from the German of Gottfried August Burger's Lenora) (see Sir Walter Scott, above)
- Ann Yearsley, The Rural Lyre

=== United States ===
- Joel Barlow. The Hasty Pudding, a mock epic on the virtues of cornmeal mush, written in France; it became Barlow's most popular work
- William Cliffton, The Group; or, An Elegant Representation, political verses defending Jay's Treaty and a satire on common people ignorantly discussing politics
- Lemuel Hopkins, "The Guillotina; or, A Democratic Dirge", a New Year's poem praising George Washington and Alexander Hamilton while attacking Thomas Jefferson and his party
- John Blair Linn, The Poetical Wanderer
- Thomas Morris, Quashy; or, The Coal-Black Maid, the author's most notable poem, describing the life of a black slave in Martinique and criticizing the British and French systems of slavery
- Robert Treat Paine, Jr., The Ruling Passion
- Isaac Story, "All the World's a Stage", published under the pen name "The Stranger", blank verse; includes popular satirical sketches
- St. George Tucker, The Probationary Odes of Jonathan Pindar, popular book of anti-Federalist satires on Alexander Hamilton, John Adams and others; written in the style of John Wolcot, who wrote under the pen name "Peter Pindar"; first published in 1793 in The National Gazette, which was edited by Philip Freneau, so the poems have been wrongly attributed to Freneau.

== Works published in other languages ==
=== Germany ===
- Johann von Goethe and Friedrich Schiller, Musenalmanach für das Jahr 1797, published in October, including hundreds of epigrams, both cuttingly satirical (Xenien) and "tame" (zahm), constructive general comments on literature and art:
  - Xenien, 414 satirical epigrams targeting critics but with a broader aim of denouncing narrow-mindedness and poor-thinking among intellectuals, with each epigram a classical distich composed of a hexameter and pentameter; published in October in Musenalmanach für das Jahr 1797; principal critics targeted were L. H. Jakob, J. K. F. Manso, and F. Nicolai; deep offense and bitter reaction resulted
  - Tabulae votivae, 124 "tame" distichs organized into 103 tabulae
  - Vielen, 18 "tame" distichs
  - Einer, 19 "tame" distichs presented as a single, continuous poem
- J. H. Voss, Homers Werke, one of the most widely read German translations of Homer

== Births ==
Death years link to the corresponding "[year] in poetry" article:

- May 15 – Charlotte Caroline Richardson (died 1854), English
- June 14 – Mathilda d'Orozco (died 1863), Swedish, originally Spanish-Italian
- July 26 – Christian Winther (died 1876), Danish poet and tutor
- September 19 – Hartley Coleridge (died 1849), English writer and poet, eldest son of Samuel Taylor Coleridge
- October – John Gardiner Calkins Brainard, (died 1828), American lawyer, editor and poet
- October 24 – August Graf von Platen (died 1835), German
- Eliza Dunlop (died 1880), Irish-born Australian poet, translator and ethnographer

== Deaths ==
Birth years link to the corresponding "[year] in poetry" article:

- February 17 – James Macpherson (born 1736), Scottish poet, writer, literary collector and politician
- February 25 – Samuel Seabury (born 1729), American Episcopal bishop and poet
- May 3 – Robert Lovell (born 1771), English poet
- May 12 – Johann Uz (born 1720), German poet
- July 21 – Robert Burns (born 1759), Scottish poet and lyricist
- December 24 – John Maclaurin, Lord Dreghorn (born 1734), Scottish judge and poet
- John Codrington Bampfylde (born 1754), English poet
- Thomas Cole (born c.1726/7), English rural poet

== See also ==
- Poetry
