= William Pattison (poet) =

English poet

William Pattinson
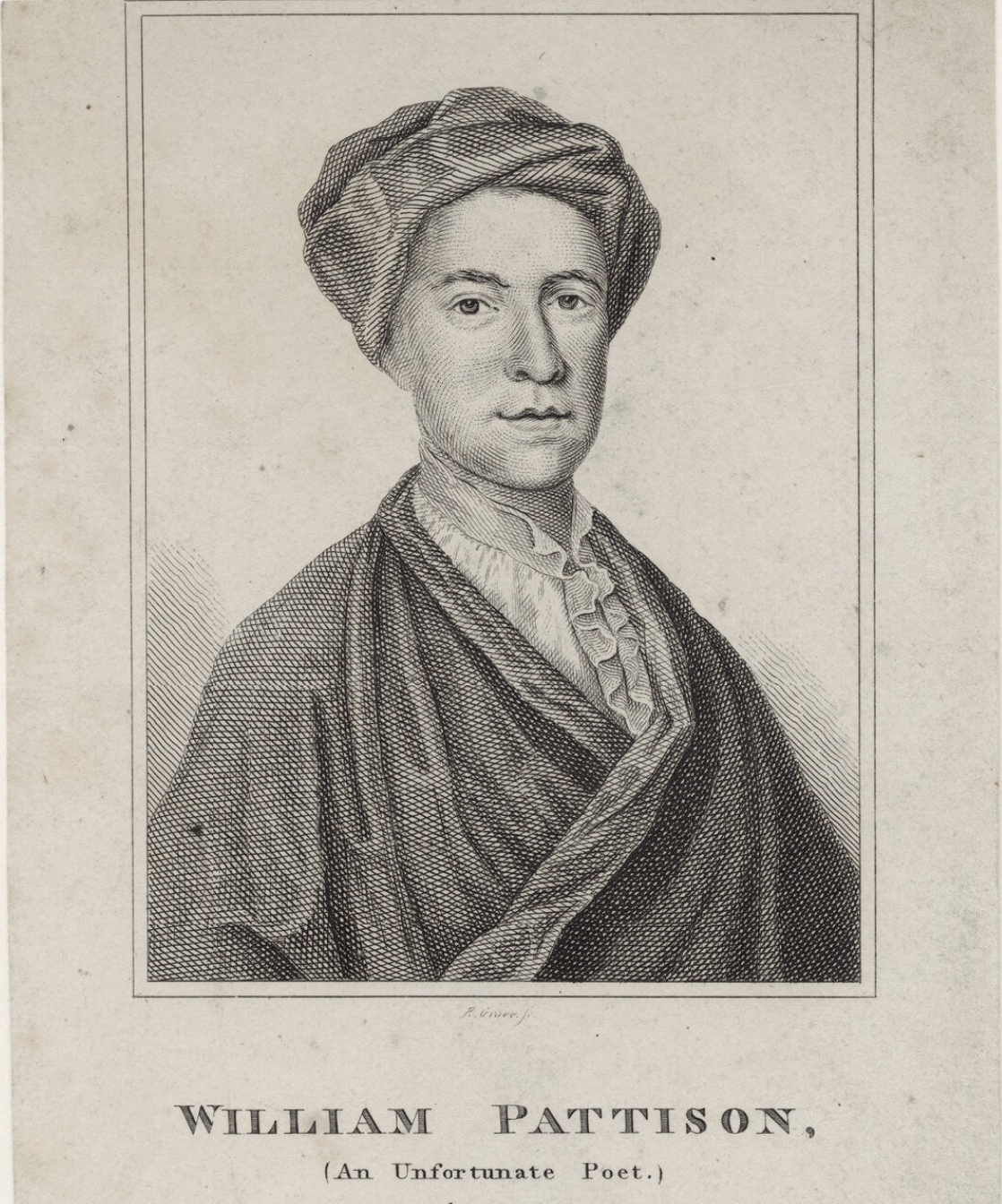
- Born: 1706
- Died: 1727 (aged 20–21)

William Pattison (1706–1727) was a short-lived English poet, now mostly remembered for his erotic poems. Pattison was admitted to Sidney Sussex College, Cambridge in 1724, but in 1726 left for a literary life in London without taking a degree. He was supported by the London bookseller Edmund Curll, one of Alexander Pope's foes, who printed his collected works in 1728. The second volume was Cupid's metamorphoses or, love in all shapes; including a Panegyrick on Cundums.
