= The Tuscan Treaty =

1733 play

- Original language: English
- Written by: William Bond
- Genre: Tragedy

Premiere
- Date: 20 August 1733
- Place: Covent Garden Theatre

The Tuscan Treaty is a 1733 tragedy by the British writer William Bond also known by the longer title The Tuscan Treaty: or, Tarquin's overthrow. It is set during the time of the Overthrow of the Roman monarchy.

The original Covent Garden cast included Thomas Walker as Porsenna and Jane Rogers as Valeria. The prologue was written by Aaron Hill. It was not considered successful on its debut, and was never revived.

== Bibliography ==
- Burling, William J. A Checklist of New Plays and Entertainments on the London Stage, 1700-1737. Fairleigh Dickinson Univ Press, 1992.
- Goring, Paul. The Rhetoric of Sensibility in Eighteenth-Century Culture. Cambridge University Press, 2004.
- Kozar, Richard & Burling, William J. Summer Theatre in London, 1661-1820, and the Rise of the Haymarket Theatre. Fairleigh Dickinson Univ Press, 2000.
