= 1729 in poetry =

Nationality words link to articles with information on the nation's poetry or literature (for instance, Irish or France).

== Events ==
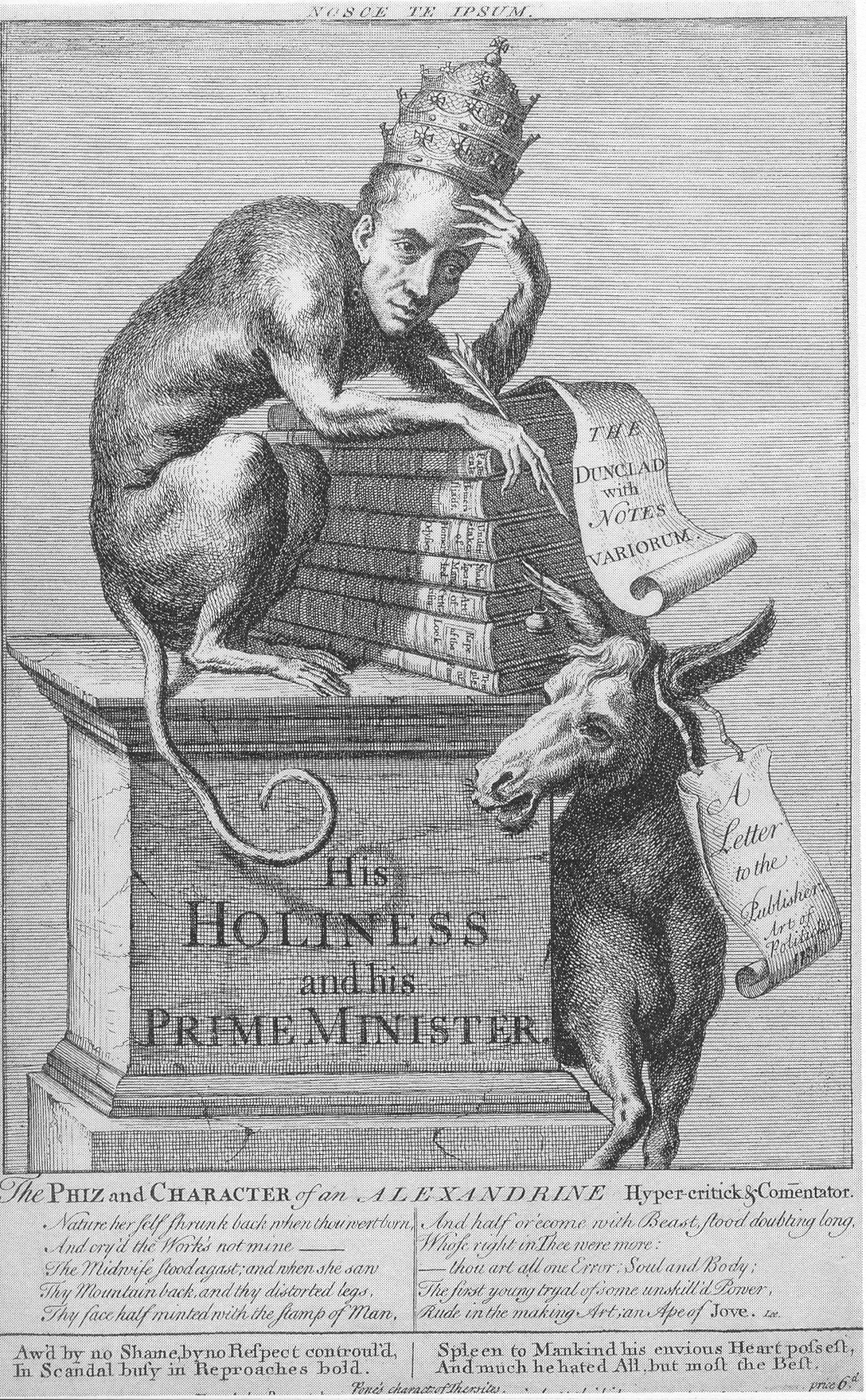
Anonymous caricature of Alexander Pope, using anti-Catholic bigotry and mocking him for his physical deformities, published this year in a pamphlet attacking the poet. (Pope also attacked at least one enemy for his physical features.)

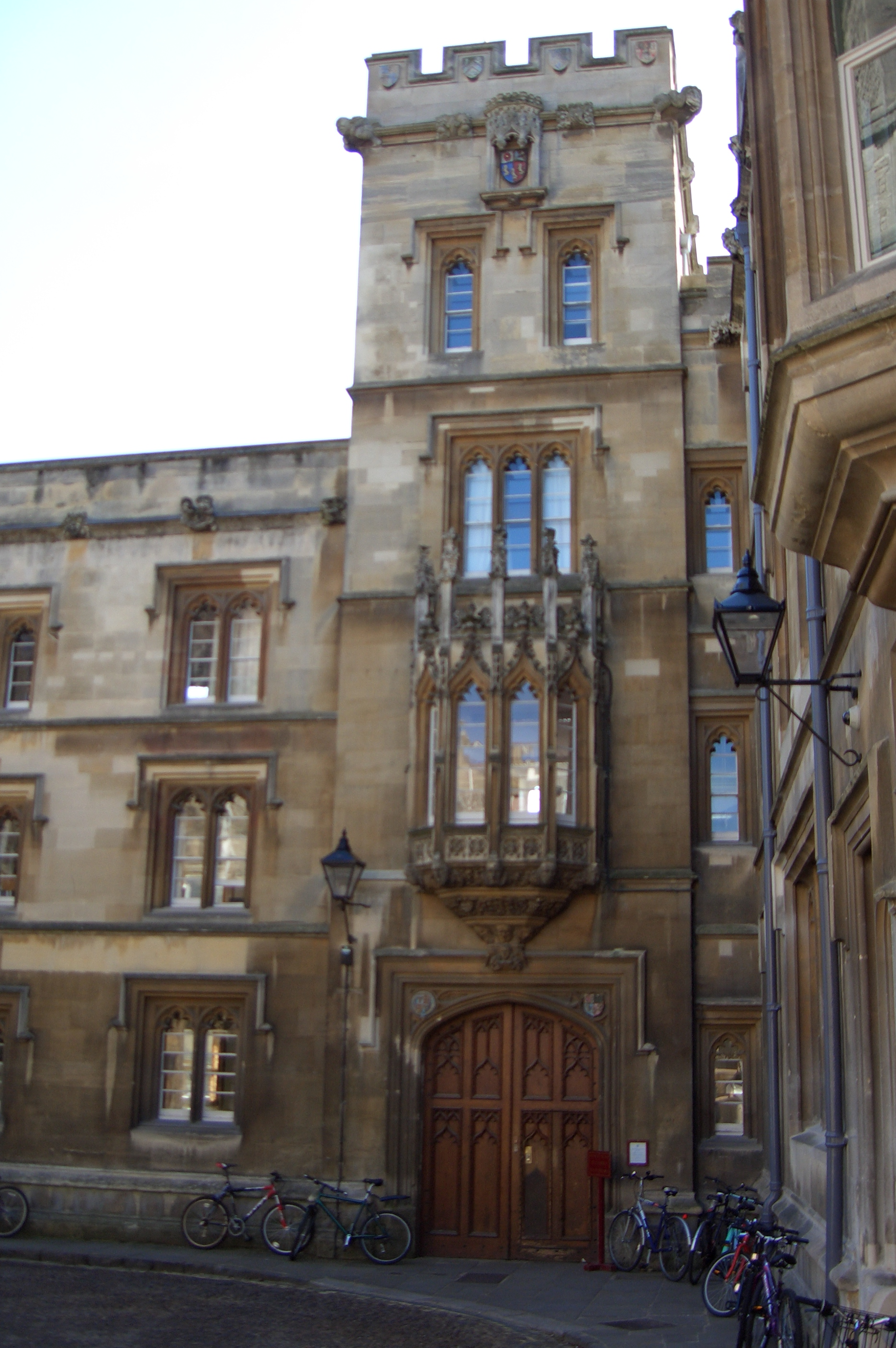
After entering the school on October 31, 1728, Samuel Johnson had rooms as an undergraduate on the second floor above the entrance of Pembroke College, Oxford. But after thirteen months, poverty forced him to leave and he returned to Lichfield.

- Alexander Pope begins writing An Essay on Man. The first three epistles will be finished by 1731 and published in early 1733, with the fourth and final epistle published in 1734. Originally published anonymously, Pope acknowledged his authorship in 1735.

== Works published ==
=== United Kingdom ===
- James Bramston, The Art of Politicks, published anonymously
- Moses Browne, Piscatory Eclogues
- Henry Carey, Poems on Several Occasions, third edition, extensively enlarged (first edition 1713)
- Thomas Cooke, Tales, Epistles, Odes, Fables, &c., published anonymously
- Soame Jenyns, The Art of Dancing, published anonymously
- Alexander Pope, The Dunciad, Variorum
- William Pulteney, 1st Earl of Bath, The Honest Jury; or, Caleb Triumphant, published anonymously
- James Ralph, Clarinda; or, The Fair Libertine, published anonymously
- Richard Savage, The Wanderer
- Jonathan Swift:
  - The Journal of a Dublin Lady, published anonymously
  - An Epistle Upon an Epistle From a Certain Doctor to a Certain Great Lord, published anonymously, published this year, although work states "1730", a satire on Patrick Delany, Epistle to His Excellency John Lord Carteret, published this year (although this work also states "1730"); (see also A Libel on D------ D---------- 1730)
- James Thomson, Britannia, published anonymously
- William Wycherley, The Posthumous Works of William Wycherley, Volume 2 (Volume 1 published 1728)

=== Other ===
- Petar (Pero) Bošković, Hvale Duhovne, Ragusan published in Venice
- Albrecht von Haller, Die Alpen, Swiss pastoral poem
- Charles de Sainte-Maure, duc de Montausier, editor and co-author, Guirlande de Julie, a manuscript of 41 madrigals first presented to Julie d'Angennes in 1641, first published in full this year, although several of the poems had previously appeared in print; five of the madrigals were written by Sainte-Maure; the other authors were Georges de Scudéry, Germain Habert, Desmarets de Saint-Sorlin, Valentin Conrart, Chapelain, Racan, Tallemant des Réaux, Antoine Godeau, Robert Arnauld d'Andilly and Simon Arnauld de Pomponne; France

== Births ==
Death years link to the corresponding "[year] in poetry" article:

- January 6 – Anne Penny, née Hughes (died 1784), Welsh-born poet
- January 22 – Gotthold Ephraim Lessing (died 1781), German poet
- April 13 – Thomas Percy (died 1811), English clergyman, bishop and poet
- May 23 – Giuseppe Parini (died 1799), Italian satirist and poet
- September 27 – Michael Denis (died 1800) Austrian writer, poet, translator, librarian and zoologist
- November 30
  - George Keate (died 1797), English poet and writer
  - Samuel Seabury (died 1796), American clergyman and poet
- Also – John Cunningham (died 1773), Irish poet and dramatist

== Deaths ==
Birth years link to the corresponding "[year] in poetry" article:

- January 19 – William Congreve (born 1670), English playwright and poet
- June 29 – Edward Taylor (born c. 1642), Colonial American poet, physician and clergyman
- October 9 – Sir Richard Blackmore (born 1654), English poet and physician
- Date not known – Sìleas na Ceapaich (born c. 1660), Scottish Gaelic poet

== See also ==
- Poetry
- List of years in poetry
- List of years in literature
- 18th century in poetry
- 18th century in literature
- Augustan poetry
- Scriblerus Club

== Notes ==
- "A Timeline of English Poetry" Web page of the Representative Poetry Online Web site, University of Toronto
