= Thomas-Simon Gueullette =

French lawyer and playwright

Thomas-Simon Gueullette (2 June 1683 – 2 December 1766) was a French lawyer, playwright, and scholar who also wrote fairy tales and works on the theatre itself.

== Life ==
A lawyer at the Châtelet de Paris, then substitute for the procureur du roi, Gueullette was a bibliophile who collected several placards and journals of his time. His works on the Théâtre-Italien, which survive in manuscript, formed the basis for the Parfaict brothers in their Histoire de l'ancien Théâtre Italien.

Gueullette was known for the publication of several fairy tales : les Soirées bretonnes, nouveaux contes de fées (Paris, 1712, in-12); les Mille et un Quarts-d’heure, contes tartares (Ibid., 1715, 2 vol. in-12; 1753, 3 vol. in-12); les Aventures merveilleuses du mandarin Fum-Hoam, contes chinois (Ibid., 1723, 2 vol. in-12); les Sultanes de Guzarate, contes mogols (Ibid., 1732, 3 vol. in-12); les Mille et une Heures, contes péruviens (Amsterdam, 1733, 2 vol. in-12).

Gueullette was the author of over 60 plays, many of which he put on at the Théâtre-Italien: La vie est un songe in 1717 (for which he was the translator), Arlequin-Pluton (1719); le Trésor supposé, en trois actes (s. d.); l’Horoscope accompli (1727), etc.

He also worked as an editor : Histoire du petit Jehan de Saintré (1724, 3 vol. in-12); Essays by Montaigne (1725, 3 vol. in-4°); Works of Rabelais (1732, 6 vol. in-8°); Pathelin.

The Bibliothèque de l'Arsenal has nine volumes of manuscripts by Gueullette.

== Bibliography ==
- Notes et souvenirs sur le Théâtre-Italien au XVIIIe siècle, publiés par J.-E. Gueullette, Paris, E. Droz, 1938.
- Pascal Bastien, L'Exécution publique à Paris au XVIIIe siècle, Seyssel, imprimerie Champ Vallon, 2006.

== Works online ==
- Le Chapeau de Fortunatus (1712)
- Arlequin Pluton (1719)
- Nocrion, conte allobroge (1747)
- La Confiance des cocus (1756)

== Sources ==
- Gustave Vapereau, Dictionnaire universel des littératures, Paris, Hachette, 1876, p. 950
