= 1801 in poetry =

Nationality words link to articles with information on the nation's poetry or literature (for instance, Irish or France).

== Events ==
- July 21 – Greenock Burns Club established to honour the memory of Scottish poet Robert Burns (died 1796).
- The second edition of Specimens of the Early English Poets, edited by George Ellis and covering poems from the Old English through to the 17th century, is influential in acquainting the general reading public with Middle English poetry, going through a further 4 editions.
- Hindusthani Press established in Calcutta, India by John Gilchrist.

== Works published in English ==
=== United Kingdom ===
- Lucy Aikin, editor and contributor, Poetry for Children, includes poems by John Dryden, Alexander Pope and Anna Barbauld (anthology)
- William Lisle Bowles, The Sorrows of Switzerland
- Sir James Burges, Richard the First
- Robert Burns, Poems Ascribed to Robert Burns (posthumous)
- Hannah Cowley, The Siege of Acre
- George Dyer, Poems
- George Ellis, ed., Specimens of the Early English Poets, 2nd edition
- Matthew Gregory Lewis, editor, Tales of Wonder, anthology of fantasy and horror poetry, London: "Printed by W. Bulmer...for the Author"
- James Hogg, Scottish Pastorals, Poems, Songs
- Thomas Moore:
  - Corruption and Intolerance, published anonymously
  - The Poetical Works of the Late Thomas Little
- Henry James Pye, Alfred
- William Barnes Rhodes, The Satires of Juvenal
- Robert Southey, Thalaba the Destroyer
- William Wordsworth and Samuel Taylor Coleridge, Lyrical Ballads, with Other Poems, 2nd edition, including "Preface to the Lyrical Ballads", two volumes; first volume, under Wordsworth's name but containing poems by Coleridge, published in January 1801, although book states "1800"

=== United States ===
- Paul Allen, Original Poems, Serious and Entertaining
- St. John Honeywood, Poems by St. John Honeywood ... With Some Pieces in Prose, New York: T. & J. Swords, United States
- John Blair Linn, The Powers of Genius, popular poem with heroic couplets in three parts
- Jonathan Mitchell Sewall, Miscellaneous Poems, many of them patriotic and political, including "Profiles of Eminent Men"
- Isaac Story, A Parnassian Shop, Opened in the Pindaric Stile, by Peter Quince, Esq., satirical verses against the Democratic Republicans, written in the style of "Peter Pindar" (John Wolcot)

== Works published in other languages ==
=== Indian subcontinent ===
- Vinayaka Bhatta, Angreja Candrika, Sanskrit poem on the glory of the British
- Mal (Jaina poet), Satbandhava Rasa, long, narrative Gujarati-language poem
- Krishna Kaur Mishra, Sriyanka, Sanskrit epic in 16 cantos about the early history of the Sikhs

== Births ==
Death years link to the corresponding "[year] in poetry" article:

- March 14 (March 2 O.S.) – Kristjan Jaak Peterson (died 1822), "father of Estonian poetry"
- February 21 – John Henry Newman (died 1890), English Roman Catholic cardinal, theologian, author and poet
- February 22 – William Barnes (died 1886), English writer, poet, minister, and philologist
- June 24 – Caroline Clive, also known as "Caroline Wigley Clive" (died 1873), English
- date unknown
  - Kaviyo Ramnath (died about 1879), Indian, Rajasthani-language poet
  - Cynthia Taggart (died 1849), American poet

== Deaths ==
Birth years link to the corresponding "[year] in poetry" article:

- January 2 – Johann Kaspar Lavater (born 1741), Swiss clergyman, philosopher, writer and poet
- January 9 – Margaretta Faugères (born 1771, American playwright, poet and political activist
- February 6 – Annis Boudinot Stockton (born 1736), American poet and sponsor of literary salons
- February 23 – Elizabeth Graeme Fergusson (born 1737), American poet and sponsor of literary salons
- March 14 – Ignacy Krasicki (born 1735), Polish Enlightenment poet ("the Prince of Poets"), Poland's La Fontaine, author of the first Polish novel, playwright, journalist, encyclopedist and translator from French and Greek
- March 25 – Friedrich von Hardenberg (born 1772), German writer, poet, mystic, philosopher and civil engineer
- March 25 – Novalis (born 1772), writer, poet and philosopher of early German Romanticism
- May 10 – Richard Gall (born 1776), Scottish
- August 11 – Félix María de Samaniego (born 1745), Spanish
- November 5 – Motoori Norinaga 本居宣長 (born 1730), Japanese Edo period scholar of Kokugaku, physician and poet
- December 23 – James Hurdis (born 1763), English clergyman and poet
- Also:
  - Jean Glover (born 1758), Scottish poet and singer, died in Ireland
  - Lemuel Hopkins (born 1750), American

== See also ==
- List of years in poetry
- List of years in literature
- 19th century in literature
- 19th century in poetry
- Romantic poetry
- Golden Age of Russian Poetry (1800–1850)
- Weimar Classicism period in Germany, commonly considered to have begun in 1788 and to have ended either in 1805, with the death of Friedrich Schiller, or 1832, with the death of Goethe
- List of poets
- Poetry

== Notes ==
- "A Timeline of English Poetry" Web page of the Representative Poetry Online Web site, University of Toronto
