= 1728 in poetry =

This article covers 1728 in poetry. Nationality words link to articles with information on the nation's poetry or literature (for instance, Irish or France).

== Works published ==
=== Colonial America ===
- Ebenezer Cooke (attributed), "An Elegy on [. . .] Nicholas Lowe"
- Richard Lewis, Muscipula, a translation of Edward Holdsworth's Latin satire on the Welsh
- Jacob Taylor, "Pennsylvania", about the colony's reliance on God's favor for its abundance and fertility; the longest poem written by this renowned almanac author

=== United Kingdom ===
- Joseph Addison, The Christian Poet: A miscellany of divine poems
- Thomas Cooke, translator, The Works of Hesiod
- John Dennis, Remarks on the Rape of the Lock, criticism by an enemy of Alexander Pope; the critic compares the poem unfavorably with Boileau's Le Lutrin, an early example of comparative criticism
- Henry Fielding, The Masquerade, published under the pen name "By Lemuel Gulliver, Poet Laureat to the King of Lilliput"
- David Mallet, The Excursion
- Christopher Pitt, translator, An Essay on Virgil's Aenid, from the Latin of Virgil (see also The Aeneid of Virgil 1740, Works of Virgil 1753)
- Alexander Pope:
  - The Dunciad: An heroic poem, Books I-III, published anonymously (expanded in 1729; followed by Book IV [The New Dunciad] in 1742, and completed in 1743)
  - Miscellanies in Prose and Verse, Volume 3, Last Volume, an anthology including prose and verse by Pope, Jonathan Swift, John Gay and John Arbuthnot (published this year, although the book states "1727"; The Third Volume [actually the fourth] 1732, Volume the Fifth 1735 with no content by Pope) included in this volume, Peri Bathous, Martin Scriblerus, his treatise on the art of sinking in poetry
- James Ralph:
  - Night
  - Sawney: An heroic poem. Occasion'd by the Dunciad, published anonymously; addressed to John Toland, James Moore Smith, and Lawrence Eusden
  - Zeuma; or, The Love of Liberty, published this year, although the book states "1729"
- Allan Ramsay, Poems by Allan Ramsay
- Richard Savage, The Bastard
- George Sewell, Posthumous Works of Dr. George Sewell
- Thomas Sheridan, translator, The Satyrs of Persius, presented in Latin and English translation
- James Thomson, Spring (see also Winter 1726, Summer 1727, The Seasons 1730)
- Edward Ward, Durgen; or, A Plain Satyr upon a Pompous Satyrist [. . .], published anonymously this year, although the book states "1729"
- William Wycherley, The Posthumous Works of William Wycherley, edited by Lewis Theobald (see also Posthumous Works 1729)
- Edward Young
  - Love of Fame, the Universal Passion
  - Ocean: An Ode

=== Other ===
- Mwengo, Utendi wa Tambuka, Swahili
- Voltaire, La Henriade, France

== Births ==
Death years link to the corresponding "[year] in poetry" article:

- Early – Lady Dorothea Du Bois, née Annesley, Irish writer (died 1774)
- January 9 – Thomas Warton, English Poet Laureate of the Kingdom of Great Britain (died 1790)
- November 10 (probable date) – Oliver Goldsmith, Anglo-Irish writer and poet (died 1774)
- Jagannatha Dasa, Indian devotional poet (died 1809)

== Deaths ==
Birth years link to the corresponding "[year] in poetry" article:

- January 28 – Esther Johnson known as "Stella", English inspiration of Jonathan Swift (born 1681). Swift, who rushed back from England last year when he was told she was deathly ill, could not keep himself at her bedside when she died. Nor does he attend her funeral. Many years later, a lock of hair, assumed to be hers, was found in his desk, wrapped in a paper bearing the words, "Only a woman's hair".
- March 8 – Giovanni Mario Crescimbeni (born 1663), Italian critic and poet
- September – Richardson Pack (born 1682), English soldier and poet
- October 15 – Bernard de la Monnoye (born 1641), French lawyer, poet, philologue and critic
- Heinrich Theobald Schenk (born 1656), American hymn writer and pastor

== See also ==
- Poetry
- List of years in poetry
- List of years in literature
- 18th century in poetry
- 18th century in literature
- Augustan poetry
- Scriblerus Club

== Notes ==
- "A Timeline of English Poetry" Web page of the Representative Poetry Online Web site, University of Toronto
