= 1809 in poetry =

This article covers 1809 in poetry. Nationality words link to articles with information on the nation's poetry or literature (for instance, Irish or France).

== Works published ==
=== United Kingdom ===
- Lord Byron, "English Bards and Scotch Reviewers", his anonymous response to the Edinburgh Review's attack on his 1807 work, Hours of Idleness; this year's response created considerable stir and shortly went through five editions; while some authors resented being satirized in its first edition, over time in subsequent editions it became a mark of prestige to be the target of Byron's pen
- Thomas Campbell, Gertrude of Wyoming: A Pennsylvanian Tale, and Other Poems; the first popular English poem set in the United States; about Gertrude's life and death after an Indian attack; the critical reception is mixed, but the poem proves popular, with three British editions and an American edition all printed in the first two years
- John Wilson Croker, The Battles of Talavera
- John Cam Hobhouse and others, Imitations and Translations from the Ancient and Modern Classics, has 29 poems by Hobhouse, nine by Lord Byron, 27 by others
- Margaret Holford (later Margaret Hodson), Wallace; or, The Fight of Falkirk
- Charles Lamb and Mary Lamb, Poetry for Children, Entirely Original
- M. G. Lewis, Monody on the Death of Sir John Moore
- Thomas Moore, The Sceptic
- Jane West, The Mother

=== United States ===
- Thomas Campbell, Gertrude of Wyoming
- Thomas Green Fessenden, Pills, Poetical, Political, and Philosophical. Prescribed for the Purpose of Purging the Publick of Fiddling Philosophers, of Puny Poetasters, of Paltry Politicians, and Petty Partisans. By Peter Pepper-Box, Poet and Physician, Philadelphia: Printed for the author
- Philip Freneau, Poems [...] Third Edition

== Births ==
Death years link to the corresponding "[year] in poetry" article:

- January 19 – Edgar Allan Poe (died 1849), American poet, short-story writer, editor and literary critic, American
- February 7 – Frederik Paludan-Muller (died 1876), Danish
- March 6 – David Bates (died 1870), American
- March 31 – Edward Fitzgerald (died 1883), English writer and poet best known for his English translation of The Rubaiyat of Omar Khayyam
- April 10 – Henry Derozio (died 1831), one of the first Indian, English-language poets (Indian poetry in English)
- June 3 – Margaret Gatty (died 1873), English writer of children's literature, poet and editor
- June 19 – Monckton Milnes (died 1885), English poet and politician
- August 6 – Alfred Tennyson (died 1892), Poet Laureate of the United Kingdom
- August 29 – Oliver Wendell Holmes Sr. (died 1894), American poet, essayist and physician
- October 18 – Thomas Holley Chivers (died 1858), American doctor-turned-poet best known for his friendship with Edgar Allan Poe and his controversial defense of the poet after his death
- October 24 – John Barr (died 1889), Scottish-New Zealander
- November 27 – Fanny Kemble (died 1893), American and English actress, author and poet
- Undated
  - Kasiprasad Ghose (died 1873), Indian
  - Mangkunegara IV (died 1881), Javanese ruler of Mangkunegaran and poet

== Deaths ==
Birth years link to the corresponding "[year] in poetry" article:

- January 15 (or January 16) – Karl Friedrich Kretschmann (born 1738), German poet, playwright and storyteller
- March 11 – Hannah Cowley (born 1743), English playwright and poet
- March 23 – Thomas Holcroft (born 1745), English novelist, poet and playwright
- March 25 – Anna Seward, called "the Swan of Lichfield" (born 1747), English poet
- May 1 – Gottlieb Konrad Pfeffel (born 1736), German writer, military scientist, educator and poet
- August 8 – Ueda Akinari, 上田 秋成, also known as "Ueda Shūsei" (born 1734), Japanese author, scholar and waka poet
- Undated – Jagannatha Dasa (born 1728), Indian devotional poet

== See also ==
- Poetry
- List of years in poetry
- List of years in literature
- 19th century in literature
- 19th century in poetry
- Romantic poetry
- Golden Age of Russian Poetry (1800–1850)
- Weimar Classicism period in Germany, commonly considered to have begun in 1788 and to have ended either in 1805, with the death of Friedrich Schiller, or 1832, with the death of Goethe
- List of poets

== Notes ==
- "A Timeline of English Poetry" Web page of the Representative Poetry Online Web site, University of Toronto
