= James Bramston =

English poet and pluralist cleric

- Born: c. 1694
- Died: 22 December 1743 (aged c. 50)
- Occupation: satirist

James Bramston (c. 1694–1743) was an English poet who specialised in satire and parody. He was also a pluralist cleric of the Church of England.

== Family ==
The son of Col. Francis Bramston, a guards officer, he was born at Skreens, near Chelmsford, Essex, and educated at Westminster School and Christ Church, Oxford. Sir John Bramston (1577–1654), Lord Chief Justice of the King's Bench, was his great-grandfather.

== Priesthood ==
Bramston took holy orders in the Anglican church and was appointed Chaplain to the 2nd Dragoon Guards in 1721. By 1724 he was married, and in that year became rector of Lurgashall in 1724, then vicar of neighbouring Harting, West Sussex in 1725. He was reinstated at Lurgashall in 1739 and named vicar of Westhampnett, near Chichester on the same day. He held these and some other preferments as a pluralist until his death.

Bramston's legacy to Lurgashall Church partly paid for rebuilding the chancel. He died on 22 December 1743 and was buried at Chalton, Hampshire. He was survived by his wife, Elizabeth.

== Verses ==
Bramston's verses include The Art of Politics (1729), in imitation of Horace's Ars Poetica, ("What's not destroy'd by Time's devouring Hand? Where's Troy, and where's the Maypole in the Strand?") and The Man of Taste (1733), in imitation of Alexander Pope ("Sur loins and rumps of beef offend my eyes,/Pleas'd with frogs fricasseed and coxcomb pies.") His Ignorami lamentatio super legis communis translationem ex Latino in Anglicum (1736), dedicated by "Ambi-dexter Ignoramus" to "Dulmannum", satirizes lawyers. It is written in Dog Latin hexameters. He also parodied John Philips's "The Splendid Shilling" in "The Crooked Sixpence".
