= 1733 in literature =

This article contains information about the literary events and publications of 1733.

== Events ==
- February 20 – The first epistle of Alexander Pope's poem An Essay on Man is published anonymously.
- March 29 – The second epistle of Pope's An Essay on Man is published.
- May – Voltaire begins his long-term relationship with Emilie de Breteuil, marquise du Chatelet.
- May 8 – The third epistle of Pope's An Essay on Man is published.
- Autumn – Laurence Sterne enters Jesus College, Cambridge.
- October – Charles Macklin makes his debut at Drury Lane Theatre in The Recruiting Officer.
- Venetian playwright Carlo Goldoni burns his first play, the tragedy Amalasunta, due to its negative reception in Milan.

== New books ==
=== Prose ===
- John Arbuthnot - An essay concerning the effects of air on human bodies
- George Berkeley – The Theory of Vision
- James Bramston – The Man of Taste (answer to Pope from 1732)
- John Durant Breval (as Joseph Gay) – Morality in Vice (part of Curll's continuing war with John Gay)
- Peter Browne – Things Supernatural and Divine Conceived by Analogy with things Natural and Human
- George Cheyne – The English Malady
- Thomas-Simon Gueullette – Les Mille et une Heures, contes péruviens (Peruvian Tales: Related in One Thousand and One Hours, by One of the Select Virgins of Cusco)
- John Hervey, 2nd Baron Hervey – An Epistle from a Nobleman to a Doctor of Divinity
- George Lyttelton, 1st Baron Lyttelton – Advice to a Lady
- Samuel Madden – Memoirs of the Twentieth Century (roman à clef about George II)
- David Mallet – Of Verbal Criticism (to Pope)
- Thomas Newcomb – The Woman of Taste (reaction to Pope's Epistle of 1732)
- Alexander Pope
  - "Of the Nature and State of Man, with Respect to" (3) "Society" (continuation of Essay on Man; the first two "epistles" published in 1732, the fourth in 1744)
  - Of the Use of Riches: An Epistle to Lord Bathurst (also as Epistle to Bathurst)
  - The Impertinent
- Elizabeth Singer Rowe – Letters Moral and Entertaining
- Jonathan Swift
  - On Poetry, a Rhapsody (contains explicit attacks on George II and many of the "dunces", resulting in arrests and prosecution.)
  - The Life and Genuine Character of Doctor Swift
- Voltaire – Letters Concerning the English Nation
- Isaac Watts – Philosophical Essays

=== Drama ===
- William Bond – The Tuscan Treaty
- John Durant Breval – The Rape of Helen (printed 1737)
- Charles Coffey – The Boarding School (performed and published)
- Henry Fielding – The Miser (from Molière)
- John Gay (died 1732) – Achilles (opera)
- Eliza Haywood – The Opera of Operas (adaptation of Fielding's Tom Thumb, with a pro-Walpole "reconciliation" scene) (opera)
- William Havard – Scanderbeg
- John Kelly – Timon in Love
- Edward Phillips
  - The Livery Rake
  - The Mock Lawyer
  - The Stage Mutineers
- António José da Silva – Vida do Grande Dom Quixote de la Mancha e do Gordo Sancho Pança
- Lewis Theobald (ed.) – The Works of Shakespeare
- Lewis Theobald – The Fatal Secret

=== Poetry ===
- Anonymous – Verses Address'd to the Imitator of the First Satire of the Second Book of Horace (attrib. Lady Mary Wortley Montagu, to Pope)
- John Banks – Poems on Several Occasions
- Samuel Bowden – Poetical Essays
- Mary Chandler – A Description of Bath
- Thomas Fitzgerald – Poems
- Matthew Green (as Peter Drake) – The Grotto
- James Hammond – An Elegy to a Young Lady
- Alexander Pope –The First Satire of the Second Book of Horace
- See also 1733 in poetry

== Births ==
- January 12 – Antoine-Marin Lemierre, French poet and dramatist (died 1793)
- March 13 – Joseph Priestley, English natural philosopher and theologian (died 1804)
- March 18 – Christoph Friedrich Nicolai, German critic and bookseller (died 1811)
- August 22 – Jean-François Ducis, French dramatist (died 1816)
- September 5 – Christoph Martin Wieland, German poet (died 1813)
- Unknown date – Robert Lloyd, English poet and satirist (died 1764)

== Deaths ==
- January 21 – Bernard de Mandeville, Dutch-born satirist and philosopher writing in English (born 1670)
- March 12 – Michel Le Quien, French theologian and historian (born 1661)
- March 13 – Mademoiselle Aïssé, Circassian-born French letter-writer (born c. 1694)
- May 10 – Jacob August Franckenstein, German lexicographer (born 1689)
- June 23 – Johann Jakob Scheuchzer, Swiss scholar (born 1672)
- August 16 – Matthew Tindal, English deist writer (born 1657)
- Unknown date – John Dunton, English writer and bookseller (born 1659)
