= John Bancks =

English writer

John Bancks (1709 – 19 April 1751), also known as John Banks, was an English writer.

Bancks was born in Sonning, Berkshire, and became apprenticed to a weaver in Reading. He suffered an accident, and left the apprenticeship before completion, becoming a bookseller in Spitalfields. He wrote poetry and biography, including works on the lives of Jesus, Oliver Cromwell and William III.

== See also ==
- List of 18th-century British working-class writers
