= 1738 in poetry =

Nationality words link to articles with information on the nation's poetry or literature (for instance, Irish or France).

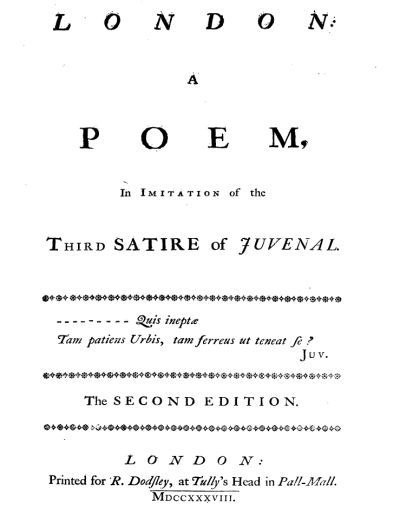
Samuel Johnson's London proved popular enough for a second edition in the same year as the first

== Events ==
- During a visit to Morpeth this year, poet Mark Akenside gets the idea for his long didactic poem, The Pleasures of the Imagination, published in 1744.

== Works published ==
=== United Kingdom ===
- Mark Akenside, A British Philippic, published anonymously
- John Banks, Miscellaneous Works in Verse and Prose
- Mather Byles, On the Death of the Queen, English, Colonial America
- Elizabeth Carter, Poems Upon Particular Occasions, published anonymously
- Robert Dodsley, The Art of Preaching, published anonymously
- John Gay, Fables: Volume the Second (see also Fables 1727)
- Samuel Johnson, London, A Poem, on the Third Satire of Juvenal
- Alexander Pope:
  - The First Epistle of the First Book of Horace Imitated
  - The Sixth Epistle of the First Book of Horace Imitated
  - One Thousand Seven Hundred and Thirty Eight
  - One Thousand Seven Hundred and Thirty Eight: Dialogue II
  - The Universal Prayer
  - (see also Pope and Swift, below)
- Frances Seymour, Countess of Hertford (later Duchess of Somerset), writing as "The Right Hon. the Countess of ****", The Story of Inkle and Yarrico, includes "An Epistle From Yarrico to Inkle, after he had left her in slavery", an imitation of Alexander Pope's "Eloisa to Abelard", a part of his Works 1717)
- Alexander Pope and Jonathan Swift, An Imitation of the Sixth Satire of the Second Book of Horace, Pope's contribution was anonymous; Part 1, by Swift, had previously appeared in Miscellanies, "The Last Volume" (that is, Volume 3) 1727
- Jonathan Swift (see also Pope and Swift above), "The Beasts' Confession"
  - and Alexander Pope, An Imitation of the Sixth Satire of the Second Book of Horace
- James Thomson, The Works of Mr. Thomson
- John Wesley, A Collection of Psalms and Hymns (first published in Charlestown 1737, see also A Collection of Psalms and Hymns 1741)

=== Other ===
- Johann Jakob Bodmer, Critical Disquisition on the Wonderful in Poetry, a defense of John Milton; German-language, Switzerland

== Births ==
Death years link to the corresponding "[year] in poetry" article:

- February 9 (bapt.) – Mary Whateley (married name: Darwall) (died 1825), English poet and playwright
- May 9 – John Wolcot (died 1819), English satirist and poet
- May 27 – Moritz August von Thümmel (died 1817), German humorist and satirical author
- June 5 (bapt.) – Erika Liebman (died 1803), Swedish poet and academic
- June 16 – Johann Christoph Krauseneck (died 1799), German composer and poet
- November 8 – Barbara Catharina Mjödh (died 1776), Swedish poet
- December 4 – Karl Friedrich Kretschmann (died 1809), German poet, playwright and storyteller
- Approximate date – Edward Thompson (died 1786), English Royal Navy officer and poet

== Deaths ==
Birth years link to the corresponding "[year] in poetry" article:

- April – Penelope Aubin (born c. 1679), English novelist and translator
- August 2 – Ueshima Onitsura (born 1661), Japanese haiku poet
- December 19 – Philip Frowde (born c. 1679), English poet and playwright

== See also ==
- Poetry
- List of years in poetry
- List of years in literature
- 18th century in poetry
- 18th century in literature
- Augustan poetry
- Scriblerus Club

== Notes ==
- "A Timeline of English Poetry" Web page of the Representative Poetry Online Web site, University of Toronto
