= 1730 in literature =

This article contains information about the literary events and publications of 1730.

== Events ==
- January 7 – The death of the Icelandic scholar Árni Magnússon activates the bequest to the University of Copenhagen in Denmark of the Arnamagnæan Manuscript Collection, which he has assembled.
- January 8 – The Grub Street Journal is launched in London, with Richard Russel and John Martyn as editors. It lasts for 418 issues.
- April 17 – Pietro Metastasio arrives in Vienna, where he settles permanently.
- December 3 – Colley Cibber becomes Poet Laureate of the Kingdom of Great Britain, in succession to Laurence Eusden.
- December 11 – Voltaire's Brutus is finally staged.
- unknown date – Romeo and Juliet becomes the first of Shakespeare's plays to be performed in America, when it is staged in New York City.

== New books ==
=== Prose ===
- Joseph Addison – The Evidences of the Christian Religion (posthumous)
- John Bancks – The Weaver's Miscellany
- Pierre François Xavier de Charlevoix – Histoire de l'Isle Espagnole ou de S. Domingue
- Thomas Cooke as "Scriblerus Tertius" – The Candidates for the Bays
- Yaakov Culi – Me'am Lo'ez
- Philip Doddridge – Free Thoughts on the Most Probable Means of Reviving the Dissenting Interest
- Johann Christoph Gottsched – Versuch einer kritischen Dichtkunst für die Deutschen
- John Hervey, 2nd Baron Hervey – Observations on the Writings of the Craftsman
- George Lyttelton, 1st Baron Lyttelton – An Epistle to Mr. Pope
- Pierre des Maizeaux – Vie de Bayle
- Isaac Rand – Index plantarum officinalium, quas ad materiae medicae scientiam promovendam, in horto Chelseiano (catalogue of plants in Chelsea Physic Garden)
- Philip Johan von Strahlenberg – Das Nord- und Ostliche Theil von Europa und Asia (North and Eastern Parts of Europe and Asia)
- Jonathan Swift – A Libel on D—— D——, and a Certain Great Lord
- Matthew Tindal – Christianity as Old as Creation
- William Whiston – Life of Samuel Clarke
- William Wotton (posthumous) – A Discourse Concerning the Confusion of Languages at Babel
- Edward Young – Two Epistles to Mr. Pope

=== Drama ===
- Theophilus Cibber – Patie and Peggy (opera)
- Henry Fielding
  - The Author's Farce
  - Rape upon Rape
  - The Temple Beau
  - Tom Thumb
- Charles Johnson – The Tragedy of Medea
- George Lillo – Sylvia
- Pierre de Marivaux – The Game of Love and Chance
- Benjamin Martyn – Timoleon
- James Miller – The Humours of Oxford
- John Mottley – The Widow Bewitched
- Gabriel Odingsells – Bayes's Opera
- James Ralph – The Fashionable Lady
- James Thomson – Sophonisba
- Edward Ward – The Prisoner's Opera

=== Poetry ===
- Stephen Duck – Poems on Several Subjects (including "The Thresher's Labour")
- Matthew Pilkington – Poems on Several Occasions
- Elizabeth Thomas – The Metamorphosis of the Town
- See also 1730 in poetry

== Births ==
- March 27 – Thomas Tyrwhitt, English critic (died 1786)
- April 1 – Salomon Gessner, Swiss painter and poet (died 1788)
- August 20 – Paul Henri Mallet, Swiss historian (died 1807)
- December 6 – Sophie von La Roche (Maria Sophie Gutermann von Gutershofen), German novelist (died 1807)
- unknown dates
  - Thomas Marryat, English medical writer and physician (died 1792)
  - Joakim Stulić, Croatian lexicographer (died 1817)
  - Tarikonda Venkamamba, Telugu poet (died 1817)
- probable year – Charlotte Lennox, Gibraltar-born Scottish novelist and poet (died 1804)

== Deaths ==
- January 7 – Árni Magnússon, Icelandic scholar (born 1663)
- February 9 – Johann Georg von Eckhart, German historian (born 1664)
- March 20 – Adrienne Lecouvreur, French actress (born 1692)
- July 16 – Elijah Fenton, English poet (born 1683)
- August 16 – Laurence Echard, English historian (born c. 1670)
- September 14 – Sophia Elisabet Brenner, Swedish poet and writer (born 1659)
- September 27 – Laurence Eusden, English Poet Laureate (born 1688)
- October 23 – Anne Oldfield, English actress (born 1683)
- November – Nedîm, Ottoman poet (born c. 1680; killed in the Patrona Halil uprising
- December 31 – Carlo Gimach, Maltese architect, engineer and poet (born 1651)
