= 1732 in poetry =

This article covers 1732 in poetry. Nationality words link to articles with information on the nation's poetry or literature (for instance, Irish or France).

== Works published ==
=== Colonial America ===
- Ebenezer Cooke (both attributed; also, see "Deaths" section below; also spelled "Cook"):
  - "An Elegy on [. . .] William Lock"
  - "In Memory of [. . .] Benedict Leonard Calvert
- Joseph Green, "Parody of a Psalm by Byles", a parody of Mather Byles' poetry
- Richard Lewis:
  - "A Description of Spring"
  - "Carmen Saeculare"
  - attributed, "A Rhapsody"

=== United Kingdom ===
- Anonymous, Castle-Howard, has been attributed to Anne Ingram, Viscountess Irwin
- Anonymous, Collection of Pieces
- Anonymous, The Gentleman's Study in Answer to the Lady's Dressing-Room, "By Miss W----" (a reply to Jonathan Swift's The Lady's Dressing-Room, also published this year)
- Robert Dodsley, A Muse on Livery; or, The Footman's Miscellany
- John Gay,Acis and Galatea: An English pastoral opera, Gay wrote the libretto for Handel's music
- George Granville, Lord Lansdowne, The Genuine Works in Verse and Prose
- William King, The Toast: An epic poem, although the book claimed to be a translation from the Latin of "Frederick Scheffer", it was an original work by King
- George Lyttelton, 1st Baron Lyttelton, The Progress of Love, published anonymously
- John Milton, Milton's Paradise Lost, edited by Richard Bentley
- Richard Savage:
  - An Epistle to the Right Honourable Sir Robert Walpole
  - Editor, A Collection of Pieces in Verse and Prose [...] Publish'd on Occasion of the Dunciad, including pieces by Edward Young, W. Harte and James Miller, together with four previously published pamphlets
- Jonathan Swift, The Grand Question Debated, published anonymously
- Jonathan Swift and Alexander Pope and others, Miscellanies: The Third Volume, in fact, it was the fourth volume (see Miscellanies 1727, 1735)
- Leonard Welsted, Of Dulness and Scandal
- Gilbert West, Stowe, anonymously published

=== Other ===
- Albrecht Haller, Attempt at Swiss Poems, German language, Switzerland
- Heyat Mahmud, Sarbabhedbāṇī; Bengali language, Bengal Subah

== Births ==
Death years link to the corresponding "[year] in poetry" article:

- February – Charles Churchill (died 1764), English poet and satirist
- February 21 – William Falconer (lost at sea c. 1770), Scottish poet

== Deaths ==
Birth years link to the corresponding "[year] in poetry" article:

- March 20 – Johann Ernst Hanxleden (born 1681), German Jesuit priest, missionary in India and a Malayalam/Sanskrit poet, grammarian, lexicographer, and philologist
- March 29 (buried) – Jane Barker (born 1652), English-born poet and playwright
- July 3 (buried) – Mary Davys (born 1674), Irish poet and playwright
- December 4 – John Gay (born 1685), English poet and playwright
- Also – Ebenezer Cooke (also spelled "Cook"; born c. 1665), English Colonial American poet

== See also ==
- Poetry
- List of years in poetry
- List of years in literature
- 18th century in poetry
- 18th century in literature
- Augustan poetry
- Scriblerus Club

== Notes ==
- "A Timeline of English Poetry" Web page of the Representative Poetry Online Web site, University of Toronto
