= Scriblerus Club =

18th Century association of English writers

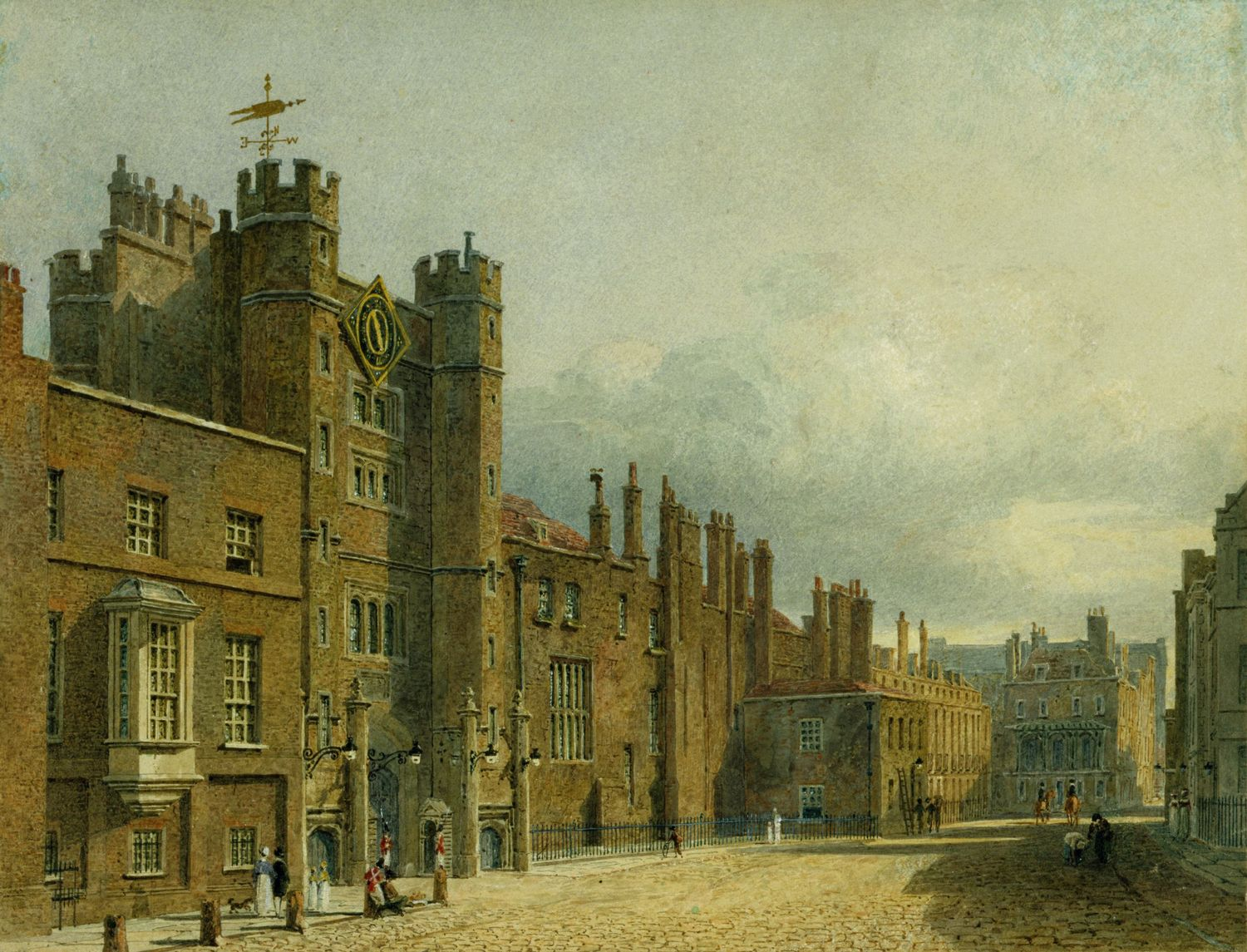
St James's Palace, where the Scriblerus Club gathered

The Scriblerus Club was an informal association of authors, based in London, that came together in the early 18th century. They were prominent figures in the Augustan Age of English letters.

The club's nucleus included the satirists Jonathan Swift and Alexander Pope. Other members were John Gay, John Arbuthnot, Henry St. John, and Thomas Parnell.

The group was founded in 1714 and lasted until the death of the founders, finally ending in 1745. Pope and Swift are the two members whose reputations and work have had the longest-lasting influence.

Working collaboratively, the group created the persona of Martinus Scriblerus, through whose writings they accomplished their satirical aims. Very little of this material, however, was published until the 1740s. Robert Harley, 1st Earl of Oxford and Mortimer, occasionally joined the club for meetings, though he is not known to have contributed to their literary output. He, along with Henry St John, 1st Viscount Bolingbroke, contributed to the club's literary productions.

The club began as an effort to satirize the abuses of learning wherever they might be found, which led to The Memoirs of Martinus Scriblerus. The second edition of Pope's The Dunciad also contains work attributed to Martinus Scriblerus.

Richard Owen Cambridge wrote a mock epic poem, the Scribleriad, whose hero is Martinus Scriblerus.

Henry Fielding's play The Welsh Opera is presented as a tribute to the "Scriblerians". Fielding's pen name was "Scriblerus Secundus".

== See also ==
- 18th century in literature
- Augustan poetry
- 1712 in poetry
- 1745 in poetry
- The Scriblerian and the Kit-Cats
