= 1654 =

1654 in various calendars
- Gregorian calendar: 1654; MDCLIV
- Ab urbe condita: 2407
- Armenian calendar: 1103; ԹՎ ՌՃԳ
- Assyrian calendar: 6404
- Balinese saka calendar: 1575–1576
- Bengali calendar: 1060–1061
- Berber calendar: 2604
- English Regnal year: 5 Cha. 2 – 6 Cha. 2 (Interregnum)
- Buddhist calendar: 2198
- Burmese calendar: 1016
- Byzantine calendar: 7162–7163
- Chinese calendar: 癸巳年 (Water Snake); 4351 or 4144 — to — 甲午年 (Wood Horse); 4352 or 4145
- Coptic calendar: 1370–1371
- Discordian calendar: 2820
- Ethiopian calendar: 1646–1647
- Hebrew calendar: 5414–5415
- Hindu calendars
- Vikram Samvat: 1710–1711
- Shaka Samvat: 1575–1576
- Kali Yuga: 4754–4755
- Holocene calendar: 11654
- Igbo calendar: 654–655
- Iranian calendar: 1032–1033
- Islamic calendar: 1064–1065
- Japanese calendar: Jōō 3 (承応３年)
- Javanese calendar: 1576–1577
- Julian calendar: Gregorian minus 10 days
- Korean calendar: 3987
- Minguo calendar: 258 before ROC 民前258年
- Nanakshahi calendar: 186
- Thai solar calendar: 2196–2197
- Tibetan calendar: ཆུ་མོ་སྦྲུལ་ལོ་ (female Water-Snake); 1780 or 1399 or 627 — to — ཤིང་ཕོ་རྟ་ལོ་ (male Wood-Horse); 1781 or 1400 or 628

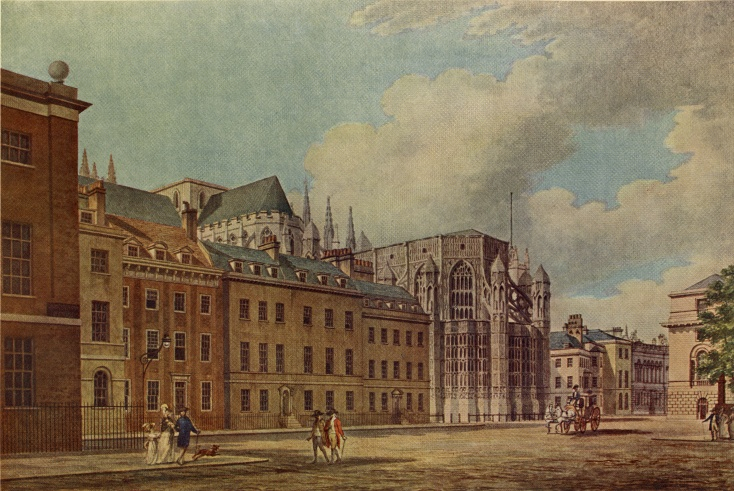
April 5: The Treaty of Westminster is signed.

1654 (MDCLIV) was a common year starting on Thursday of the Gregorian calendar and a common year starting on Sunday of the Julian calendar, the 1654th year of the Common Era (CE) and Anno Domini (AD) designations, the 654th year of the 2nd millennium, the 54th year of the 17th century, and the 5th year of the 1650s decade. As of the start of 1654, the Gregorian calendar was 10 days ahead of the Julian calendar, which remained in localized use until 1923.

== Events ==
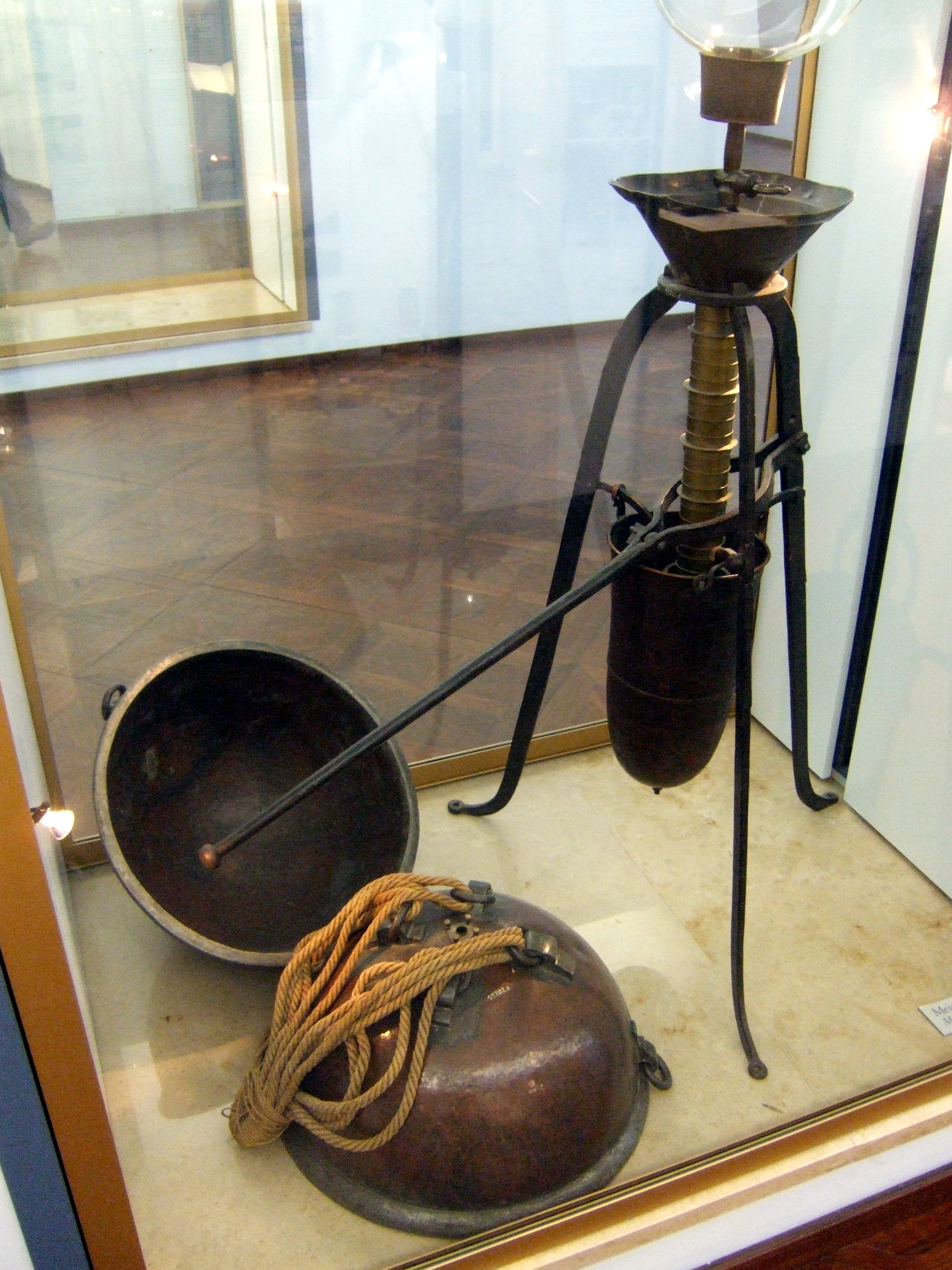
The original Magdeburg hemispheres and Guericke's vacuum pump in the Deutsches Museum, Munich, Germany

=== January–March ===
- January 6 – In India, Jaswant Singh of Marwar (in the modern-day state of Rajasthan) is elevated to the title of Maharaja by Emperor Shah Jahan.
- January 11 – Arauco War – Battle of Río Bueno in southern Chile: Indigenous Huilliche warriors rout Spanish troops from Fort Nacimiento, who are attempting to cross the Bueno River.
- January 26 – Portugal recaptures the South American city of Recife from the Netherlands after a siege of more than two years during the Dutch-Portuguese War, bringing an end to Dutch rule of what is now Brazil. The Dutch West India Company has held the city (which they call Mauritsstad) for more than 23 years.
- February 9 – Spanish troops led by Don Gabriel de Rojas y Figueroa succeed in the capture of Fort Rocher, a pirate-controlled base on the Caribbean island of Tortuga.
- February 10 – The Battle of Tullich takes place in Aberdeenshire in Scotland during Glencairn's rising, a revolt by Scottish royalists against the Commonwealth of England, Scotland and Ireland led by Lord Protector Oliver Cromwell. The battle is indecisive.
- March 13 – The Treaty of Pereyaslav is concluded in the city of Pereyaslav during a meeting between the Cossacks of the Zaporozhian Host and Tsar Alexey I of Russia following the end to the Khmelnytsky Uprising in Ukraine, which started in 1648 and has resulted in the massacre of many thousands of Jews.

=== April–June ===
- April 5 – The Treaty of Westminster, ending the First Anglo-Dutch War, is signed.
- April 11 – A commercial treaty between England and Sweden is signed.
- April 12 – Oliver Cromwell creates a union between England and Scotland, with Scottish representation in the Parliament of England.
- May 5 – Cromwell's Act of Grace, officially the Act of Pardon and Grace to the People of Scotland, is proclaimed at the Mercat Cross in Edinburgh.
- May 8 – Otto von Guericke demonstrates the power of atmospheric pressure and the effectiveness of his vacuum pump, using the Magdeburg hemispheres, before Ferdinand III, Holy Roman Emperor, and the Imperial Diet in Regensburg.
- June 3 – Louis XIV of France is crowned at Reims.
- June 16 (June 6 Old Style) – Charles X Gustav succeeds his cousin Christina on the Swedish throne. After her abdication on the same day, Christina, now the former reigning queen of a Protestant nation, secretly converts to Catholicism.

=== July–September ===
- July 5 – The Russian Army camps outside Smolensk and the Thirteen Years' War starts between Russia and Poland over Ukraine.
- July 10
  - Peter Vowell and John Gerard are executed in London for plotting to assassinate Oliver Cromwell.
  - Don Pantaleon, brother of the Portuguese ambassador to England, is executed after the death of an innocent man following a fracas at the exchange in Exeter.
- August 12 – The Battle of Shklow, one of the first clashes of the Russo-Polish War, takes place at the modern-day Belarusan town of Škłoŭ during a total eclipse of the Sun visible over Eastern Europe. The Russian troops retreat.
- August 18 – Oliver Cromwell launches the Western Design with the appointment of Admiral William Penn to prepare for a fleet to leave on Christmas Day for an English expedition to the Caribbean to counter Spanish commercial interests, effectively beginning the Anglo-Spanish War (which will last until after the English Restoration in 1660). The fleet leaves Portsmouth in late December.
- August 22 – Jewish arrival in New Amsterdam: 23 Sephardic Jews arrive as refugees from Brazil and settle in New Amsterdam, forming the nucleus of what will be the second largest urban Jewish community in history, that of New York City, and of Congregation Shearith Israel, the first synagogue in North America.
- August 25 – Russia routs the Polish Army in the Battle of Shepeleviche.
- September 3 – In England, the First Protectorate Parliament assembles.
- September 12 – Oliver Cromwell orders the exclusion of 120 members of Parliament who are hostile to him.
- September 23 – Smolensk falls to the Russian Army after almost three months.

=== October –December ===
- October 12 – The Delft Explosion, in the arsenal, devastates the city in the Netherlands, killing more than 100, among whom is Carel Fabritius (32), the most promising student of Rembrandt.
- October 31 – Ferdinand Maria, Elector of Bavaria, is crowned. His absolutist style of leadership becomes a benchmark for the rest of Germany.
- November 23 – French mathematician, scientist and religious philosopher Blaise Pascal experiences an intense mystical vision that marks him for life.
- December 11 – Sir William Petty wins the contract from the Commonwealth of England to make a survey of Ireland.
- December 14 – Jerónimo de Ataíde, Count of Atouguia, becomes Portugal's new Governor-General of Brazil, succeeding João Rodrigues de Vasconcelos e Sousa.
- December 25 – An English Navy fleet of 17 warships and 20 transports, carrying 325 cannons, 1,145 seamen, and 1,830 troops, under the command of Admiral William Penn departs from Portsmouth to begin Oliver Cromwell's planned surprise attack on Spain's colonies in the New World.

== Births ==
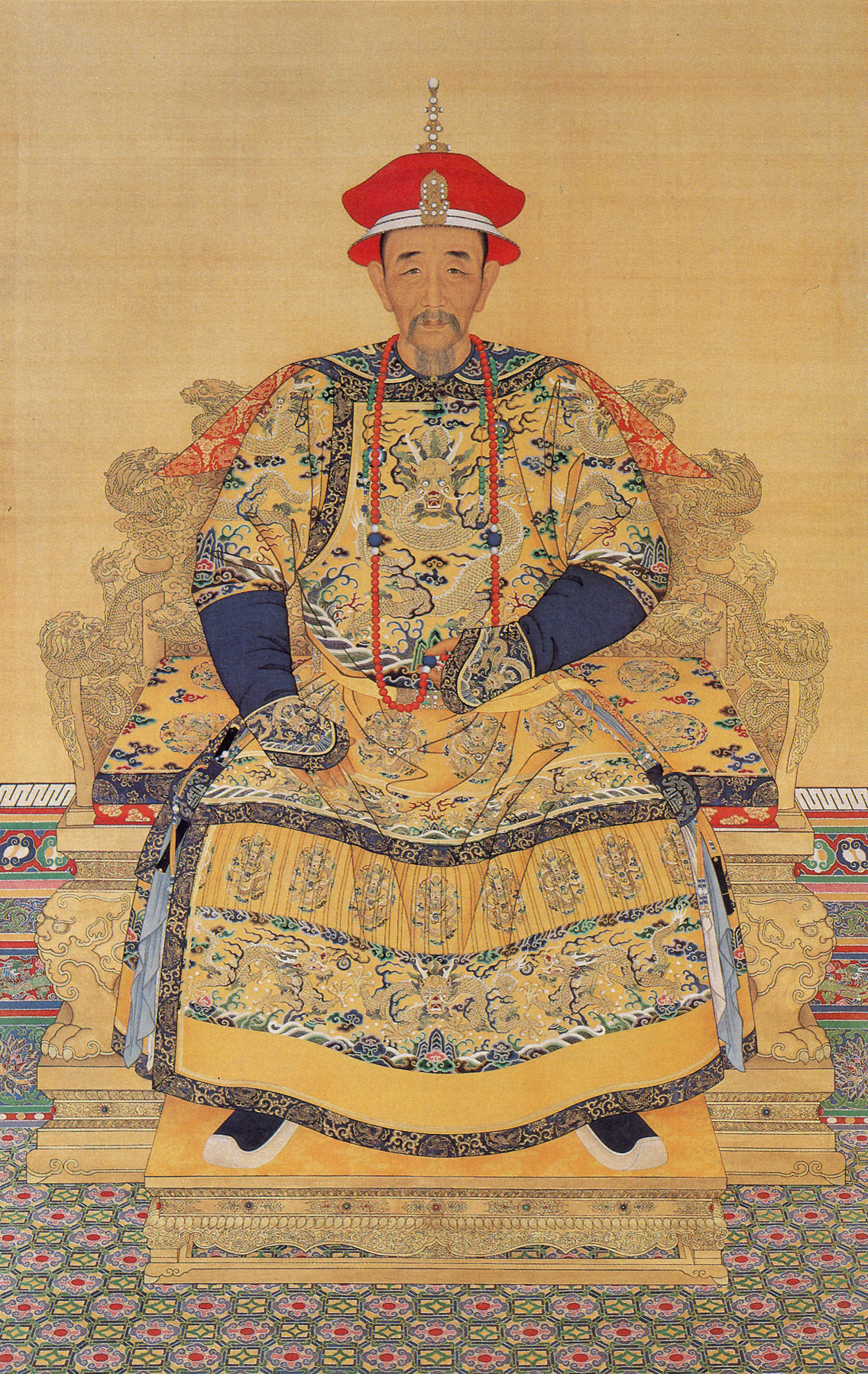
Kangxi Emperor

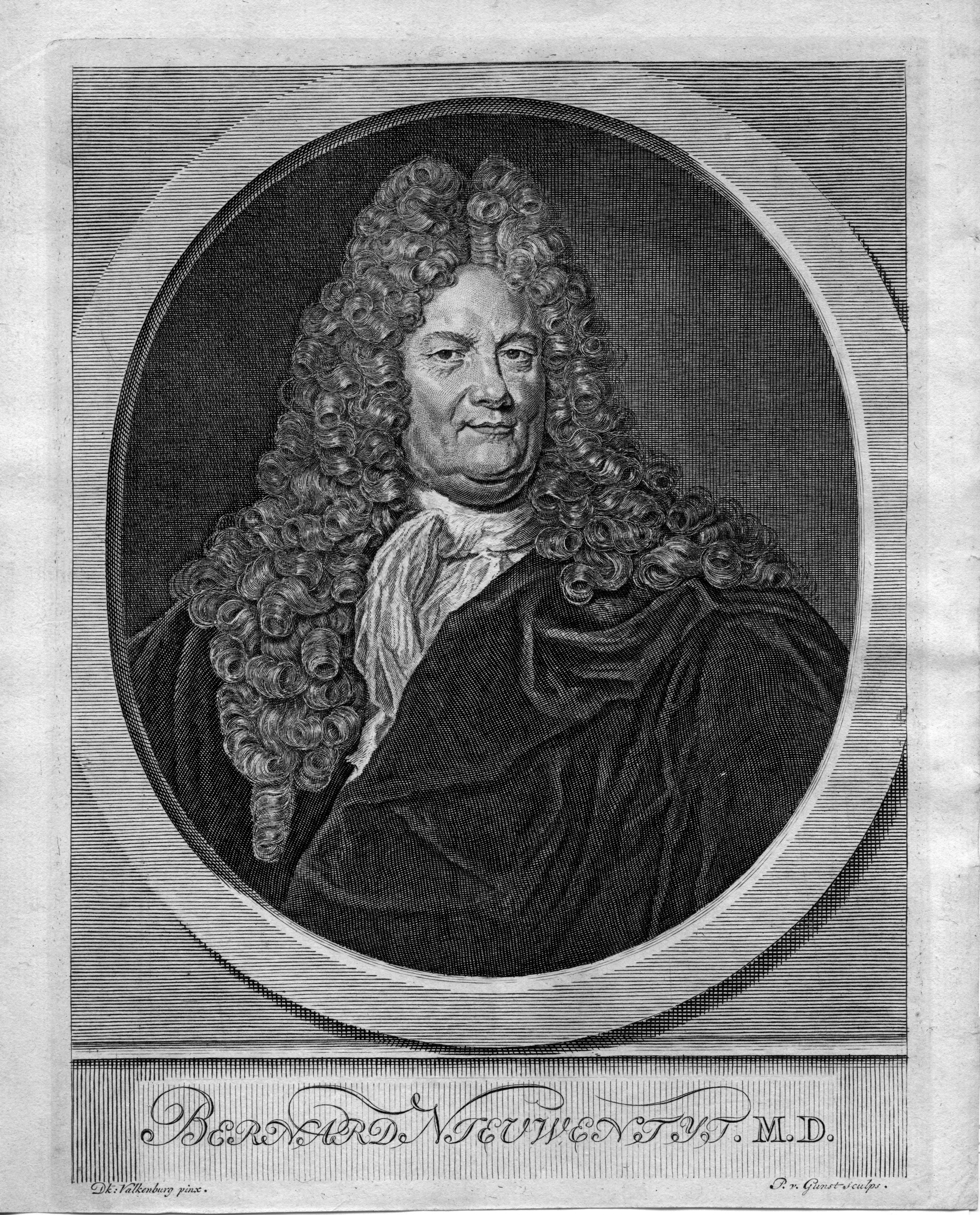
Bernard Nieuwentyt

- January 5 – Henry Poley, English politician (d. 1707)
- January 10 – Joshua Barnes, English scholar (d. 1712)
- January 10 – Giovanni Maria Gabrielli, Italian Catholic cardinal (d. 1711)
- January 20 – Michiel de Swaen, Flemish poet (d. 1707)
- January 22 – Richard Blackmore, English physician and writer (d. 1729)
- February 3 – Pietro Antonio Fiocco, Italian composer (d. 1714)
- February 12 – Dorothea Maria of Saxe-Gotha-Altenburg, German princess (d. 1682)
- February 15 – Tsarevich Alexei Alexeyevich of Russia, son and heir of Tsar Alexis of Russia (d. 1670)
- February 22 – Elizabeth Monck, Duchess of Albemarle (d. 1734)
- March 6 – Andreas Acoluthus, German scholar (d. 1704)
- March 9 – Robert Leke, 3rd Earl of Scarsdale, English earl, politician (d. 1707)
- March 10 – Giuseppe Bartolomeo Chiari, Italian painter (d. 1727)
- March 12 – Charles Egerton (MP for Brackley), English politician (d. 1717)
- March 12 – Giuseppe Passeri, Italian painter (d. 1714)
- March 12 – Jan Hoogsaat, Dutch painter (d. 1730)
- March 12 – Frederick Augustus, Duke of Württemberg-Neuenstadt (d. 1716)
- March 16 – Andreas Acoluthus, German orientalist (d. 1704)
- March 28 – Sophie Amalie Moth, royal mistress of King Christian V of Denmark (d. 1719)
- March 28 – Joan de Cabanas, Occitan language writer (d. 1711)
- March 31 – Lorenzo Cozza, Italian Catholic cardinal (d. 1729)
- April 8 – Peder Krog, Lutheran bishop (d. 1731)
- April 20 – John Backwell, English politician (d. 1708)
- April 27 – Charles Blount (deist), English deist and philosopher (d. 1693)
- April 30 – Robert Digby, 3rd Baron Digby, English peer and Member of Parliament (d. 1677)
- May 4 – Kangxi Emperor of Qing China (d. 1722)
- May 13 – Thomas Lennard, 1st Earl of Sussex, English cricketer (d. 1715)
- May 23 – Nicodemus Tessin the Younger, Swedish architect (d. 1728)
- May 28 – Thomas Handcock, Irish politician (d. 1726)
- June 4 – Jean-François Gerbillon, French Jesuit missionary active in China (d. 1707)
- June 23 – Grzegorz Antoni Ogiński, Polish-Lithuanian noble (d. 1709)
- June 23 – Richard Onslow, 1st Baron Onslow, English politician (d. 1717)
- June 23 – Sophia of Saxe-Weissenfels, Princess of Anhalt-Zerbst (d. 1724)
- June 24 – Thomas Fuller (writer), British physician (d. 1734)
- June 30 – Thomas Rice (1654), Massachusetts legislator (d. 1747)
- July 1 – Louis Joseph, Duke of Vendôme, French military commander (d. 1712)
- July 7 – Aoyama Tadashige, Japanese daimyō (d. 1722)
- July 9 – Emperor Reigen of Japan (d. 1732)
- July 24 – Henry Herbert, 1st Baron Herbert of Chirbury, English politician (d. 1709)
- July 25 – Agostino Steffani, Italian ecclesiastic, diplomat and composer (d. 1728)
- August 3 – Charles I, Landgrave of Hesse-Kassel (d. 1730)
- August 4 – Thomas Brodrick (1654–1730), Irish politician (d. 1730)
- August 10 – Bernard Nieuwentyt, Dutch mathematician and philosopher (d. 1718)
- August 15 – John Joseph of the Cross, Italian saint (d. 1739)
- August 23 – Anthony Morris (I), American politician (d. 1721)
- September 7 – François Pagi, French Franciscan historian of the Catholic Church (d. 1721)
- September 11 – William Handcock (1654–1701), Irish politician (d. 1701)
- September 16 – Philippe Avril, French Jesuit explorer (d. 1698)
- October 6 – Johan Peringskiöld, Swedish antiquarian (d. 1720)
- October 18 – John Frederick, Margrave of Brandenburg-Ansbach (d. 1686)
- October 23 – Johann Bernhard Staudt, Austrian composer (d. 1712)
- October 26 – Giovanni Maria Lancisi, Italian physician (d. 1720)
- November 5 – Christian Liebe, German composer (d. 1708)
- November 7 – Sir John Delaval, 3rd Baronet, English politician (d. 1729)
- November 9 – Christoph Weigel the Elder, German engraver (d. 1725)
- November 23 – George Watson (accountant), a Scottish accountant and the founder of George Watson's College in Edinburgh (d. 1723)
- November 23 – Jan van Kessel the Younger, Flemish painter in Spain (d. 1708)
- November 27 – Friedrich von Canitz, German poet and diplomat (d. 1699)
- December 1 – John Hartstonge, Irish bishop (d. 1717)
- December 10 – Giovanni Gioseffo dal Sole, Italian painter (d. 1719)
- December 13 – Robert Livingston the Elder, New York colonial official (d. 1728)
- December 15 – Johann Theodor Jablonski, German lexicographer (d. 1731)
- December 22 – Edmond Martène, French Benedictine historian and liturgist (d. 1739)
- December 30 – Archduchess Maria Anna Josepha of Austria, youngest surviving daughter of Ferdinand III (d. 1689)
- probable – Eleanor Glanville, English entomologist (died 1709)

== Deaths ==
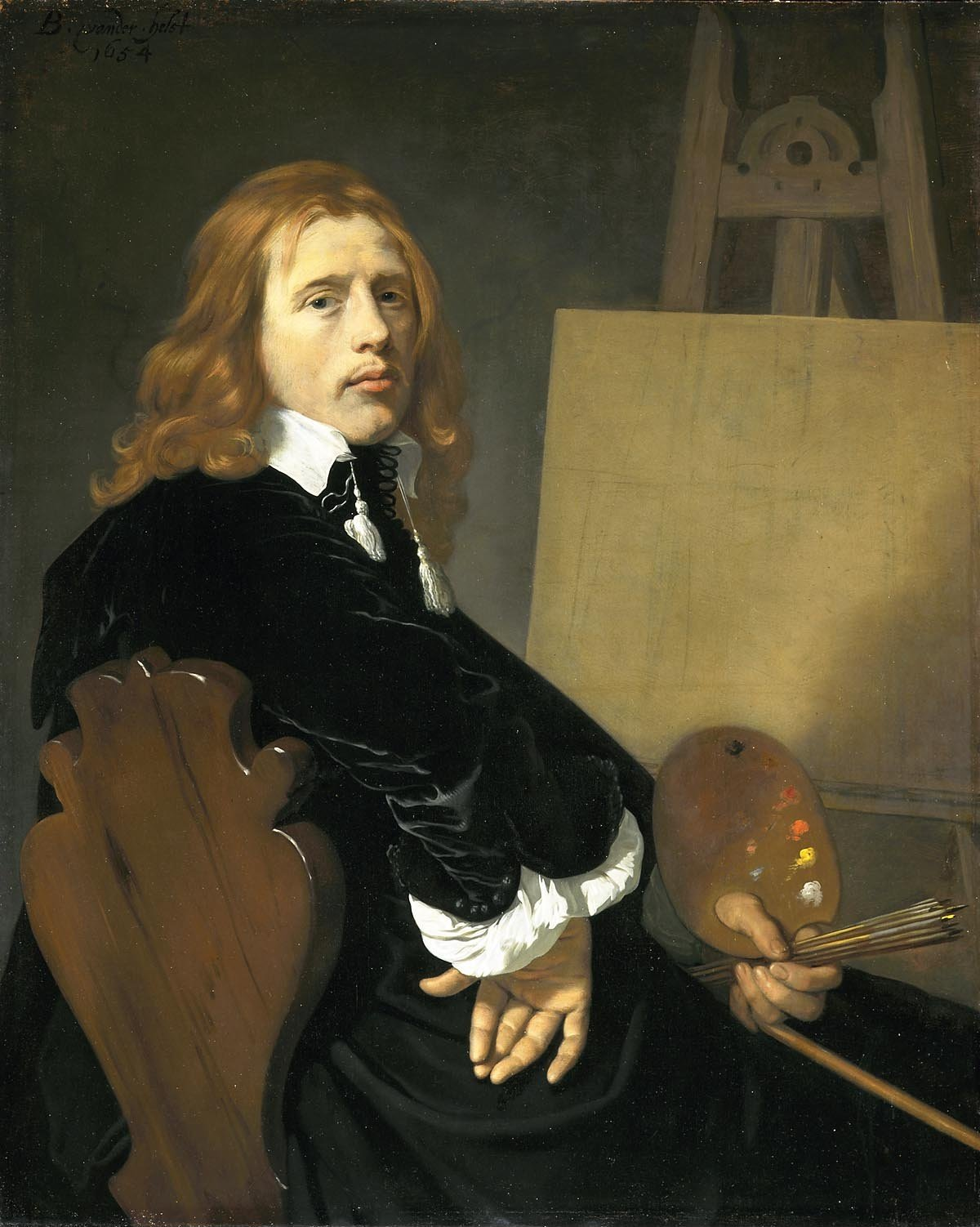
Paulus Potter

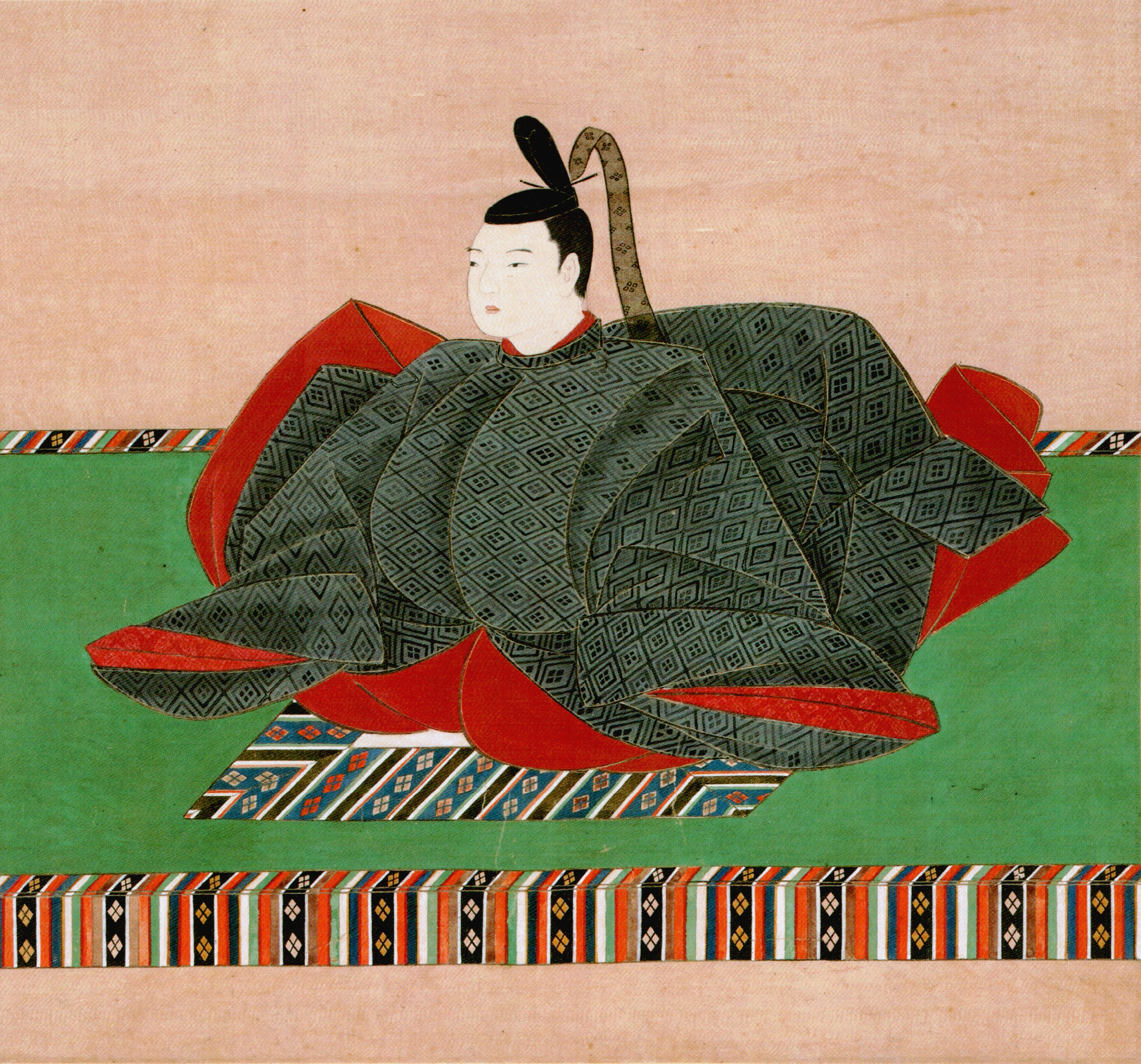
Emperor Go-Kōmyō

- January 10 – Nicholas Culpeper, English botanist (b. 1616)
- January 17 – Paulus Potter, Dutch painter (b. 1625)
- February 6 – Francesco Mochi, Italian early-Baroque sculptor (b. 1580)
- February 8 – Luca Ferrari, Italian painter (b. 1605)
- February 18 – Jean-Louis Guez de Balzac, French writer (b. 1594)
- March 7 – Ernest Gottlieb, Prince of Anhalt-Plötzkau (b. 1620)
- March 14 – Jan van Balen, Flemish painter (b. 1611)
- March 15 – Jean Guiton, French Huguenot ship owner (b. 1585)
- March 19 – Matsudaira Norinaga, Japanese daimyō (b. 1600)
- March 22 – Théodore de Mayerne, Swiss physician (b. 1573)
- March 24 – Samuel Scheidt, German composer (b. 1587)
- March 30 – Aleksander Ludwik Radziwiłł, Polish noble (b. 1594)
- April 5 – Jacobus Trigland, Dutch theologian (b. 1583)
- May 18 – Muhammad Qadiri, Punjabi founder of the Naushahia branch of the Qadri Order (b. 1552)
- May 21 – Elizabeth Poole, English settler in Plymouth Colony (b. 1588)
- May 31 – Hippolytus Guarinonius, Italian physician and polymath (b. 1571)
- June 10 – Alessandro Algardi, Italian sculptor and architect (b. 1598)
- June 14 – Dániel Esterházy, Hungarian noble (b. 1585)
- June 27 – Johannes Valentinus Andreae, German theologian (b. 1586)
- July 9 – Ferdinand IV, King of the Romans (b. 1633)
- July 23 – Orazio Grassi, Italian Jesuit priest, architect and scientist (b. 1583)
- August 12 – Cornelius Haga, Dutch diplomat (b. 1578)
- August 19 – Yom-Tov Lipmann Heller, Bohemian rabbi and liturgical poet (b. 1579)
- August 28 – Axel Oxenstierna, Lord High Chancellor of Sweden since 1612 (b. 1583)
- August 29 – Wouter van Twiller, Director-General of New Netherland from 1633 until 1638 (b. 1606)
- August 31 – Ole Worm, Danish physician and antiquary (b. 1588)
- September 6 – Christian I, Count Palatine of Birkenfeld-Bischweiler (1600–1654) (b. 1598)
- September 8 – Peter Claver, Spanish Jesuit priest (b. 1580)
- September 27 – Louis, Duke of Joyeuse, younger son of Charles (b. 1622)
- September 29 – George John II, Count Palatine of Lützelstein-Guttenberg (b. 1586)
- October 12 – Carel Fabritius, Dutch artist (b. 1622)
- October 16 – Hercule, Duke of Montbazon (b. 1568)
- October 20 – Sir Thomas Jervoise, English politician (b. 1587)
- October 30 – Emperor Go-Kōmyō of Japan (b. 1633)
- November 27 – Pieter Meulener, Flemish Baroque painter (b. 1602)
- November 26 – Giambattista Altieri, Italian Catholic cardinal (b. 1589)
- November 30
  - John Selden, English jurist (b. 1584)
  - William Habington, English poet (b. 1605)
- December 1 – Jakov Mikalja, Italian linguist and lexicographer (b. 1601)
- December 4 – Sir Christopher Yelverton, 1st Baronet, English politician (b. 1602)
- December 5 – Jean François Sarrazin, French writer (b. c. 1611)
- date unknown – Elizabeth Isham, English diarist (b. 1609)
