= Shapyalyevichy =

Village in Mogilev Region, Belarus

Shapyalyevichy Шапялевічы (Belarusian) Шепелевичи (Russian)
- Village
- Location within Belarus
- Coordinates: 54°07′34″N 29°33′51″E
- Country: Belarus
- Region: Mogilev Region
- District: Kruhlaye District
- Time zone: UTC+3 (MSK)

Shapyalyevichy (Belarusian: Шапялевічы, romanized: Šapialievičy; Russian: Шепелевичи, romanized: Shepelevichi) is a village in Kruhlaye District, Mogilev Region, Belarus. It is located 55 kilometres (34 mi) west-northwest of Mogilev, and it is administratively part of Tsyatsyeryn selsoviet.

== History ==
On 24 August 1654, Russian forces defeated the Poles at the Battle of Shepeleviche during the Russo-Polish War.

During World War II, the village was under German military occupation from 8 July 1941 until 1944. Several dozen Jews remained at the start of the occupation. On 15 November 1941, the Jews were escorted by local police to a quarry outside the village and about 30 or 40 Jews were shot. The remaining Jews were put in a ghetto until 12 December, when they were transferred to the ghetto in Kruhlaye. They shared the same fate as the Jews there, most of whom were shot in early 1942.

== Sources ==
- Megargee, Geoffrey P.; Dean, Martin (4 May 2012). The United States Holocaust Memorial Museum Encyclopedia of Camps and Ghettos, 1933 –1945: Volume II: Ghettos in German-Occupied Eastern Europe. Indiana University Press. pp. 1728–1729. ISBN 978-0-253-00202-0.
