= Tsyatsyeryn =

Agrotown in Mogilev Region, Belarus

Tsyatsyeryn Цяцерын (Belarusian) Тетерин (Russian)
- Agrotown
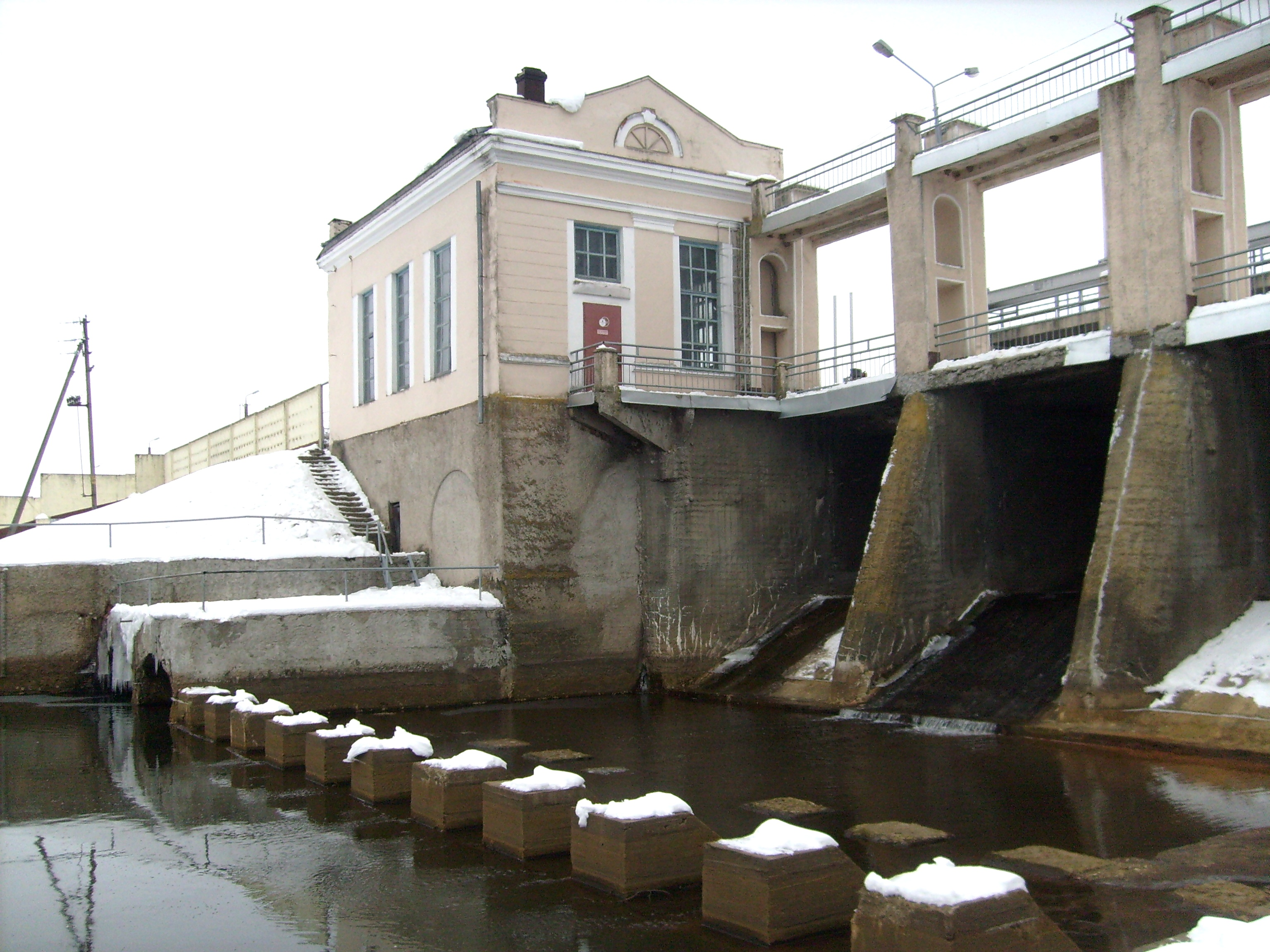

- Location within Belarus
- Coordinates: 54°09′28″N 29°45′41″E
- Country: Belarus
- Region: Mogilev Region
- District: Kruhlaye District

Population (2003)
  - Total: 482
- Time zone: UTC+3 (MSK)

Tsyatsyeryn (Belarusian: Цяцерын, romanized: Ciacieryn; Russian: Тетерин, Тетерино, romanized: Teterin, Teterino) is an agrotown in Kruhlaye District, Mogilev Region, Belarus. It is located nine kilometres (5.6 mi) from Kruhlaye, 31 kilometres (19 mi) from Talachyn, and 65 kilometres (40 mi) from Mogilev. It serves as the administrative center of Tsyatsyeryn selsoviet. In 2003, it had a population of 482.

== History ==
At the 1897 Russian census, the settlement had a population of 602, with 286 being Jews. In 1923, 246 Jews lived there.

During World War II, it was under German occupation from July 1941, with all Jews being murdered in the spring of 1942.

== Sources ==
- Shcharbataw, A. G. (2003). "Цяцерын". Беларуская энцыклапедыя: У 18 т. Т. 17: Хвінявічы — Шчытні (in Belarusian). Minsk: Беларуская энцыклапедыя. p. 199. ISBN 985-11-0279-2.
- Spector, Shmuel; Wigoder, Geoffrey (2001). The Encyclopedia of Jewish Life Before and During the Holocaust: Seredina-Buda-Z. NYU Press. p. 1364. ISBN 985-11-0279-2.
