= List of solar eclipses in the 17th century =

This is a list of solar eclipses in the 17th century. During the period 1601 to 1700 there were 248 solar eclipses of which 89 were partial, 74 were annular, 61 were total (one non-central), and 24 were hybrids. The greatest number of eclipses in one year was four, occurring in 16 different years: 1613, 1620, 1624, 1631, 1638, 1642, 1649, 1653, 1660, 1667, 1671, 1678, 1685, 1689, 1693, and 1696. Two months, May 1631 and May 1696, had two eclipses.

Date	Time of greatest eclipse	Saros cycle	Type	Magnitude	Central duration	Location	Path width	Geographical area	Ref(s)
4 January 1601	12:24:38	125	Annular	0.9437	07m 13s	9.1°S 7.0°W	214 km (133 mi)		
30 June 1601	03:03:59	130	Total	1.0697	06m 37s	5.3°S 130.7°E	259 km (161 mi)		
24 December 1601	12:50:31	135	Annular	0.9078	10m 14s	46.6°N 21.5°W	051 km (32 mi)		
21 May 1602	13:06:44	102	Partial	0.4132	—	68.8°N 178.3°W	—		
19 June 1602	20:19:21	140	Partial	0.6174	—	66.1°S 135.7°W	—		
13 November 1602	20:03:05	107	Partial	0.3363	—	69.5°S 84.8°E	—		
11 May 1603	01:44:59	112	Annular	0.9987	00m 07s	54.7°N 142.6°E	6 km (3.7 mi)		
3 November 1603	05:54:55	117	Total	1.0193	01m 31s	51.1°S 75.6°E	83 km (52 mi)		
29 April 1604	07:07:21	122	Annular	0.9525	06m 12s	6.3°N 74.8°E	176 km (109 mi)		
22 October 1604	21:03:48	127	Total	1.0567	05m 12s	5.9°S 137.8°W	188 km (117 mi)		
18 April 1605	07:26:44	132	Annular	0.9327	06m 43s	49.8°S 89.9°E	553 km (344 mi)		
12 October 1605	12:59:58	137	Total	1.0344	02m 43s	43.4°N 0.6°E	193 km (120 mi)		
8 March 1606	20:45:39	104	Partial	0.5800	—	71.9°N 156.4°E	—		
2 September 1606	12:07:23	109	Partial	0.6182	—	71.7°S 66.5°W	—		
26 February 1607	09:10:38	114	Total	1.0388	03m 34s	18.4°N 38.2°E	147 km (91 mi)		
22 August 1607	14:20:48	119	Annular	0.9416	07m 34s	16.1°S 41.4°W	245 km (152 mi)		
16 February 1608	01:03:28	124	Total	1.0515	04m 29s	24.8°S 171.7°E	175 km (109 mi)		
10 August 1608	15:00:06	129	Annular	0.9581	04m 46s	31.0°N 39.6°W	158 km (98 mi)		
4 February 1609	15:43:43	134	Hybrid	1.0041	00m 15s	77.3°S 7.2°E	37 km (23 mi)		
30 July 1609	21:07:08	139	Partial	0.9657	—	69.5°N 17.9°E	—		
26 December 1609	07:43:34	106	Partial	0.4877	—	66.3°N 73.9°E	—		
21 June 1610	03:23:00	111	Total	1.0705	05m 59s	31.5°S 135.5°E	400 km (250 mi)		
15 December 1610	07:06:48	116	Annular	0.9153	11m 56s	14.7°N 78.2°E	409 km (254 mi)		
10 June 1611	20:34:25	121	Total	1.0686	06m 16s	18.4°N 127.6°W	224 km (139 mi)		
4 December 1611	08:03:43	126	Annular	0.9498	05m 44s	26.9°S 56.0°E	185 km (115 mi)		
30 May 1612	10:34:29	131	Total	1.0135	00m 58s	63.6°N 1.9°W	65 km (40 mi)		
22 November 1612	16:04:35	136	Hybrid	1.0002	00m 01s	65.7°S 98.4°W	1 km (0.62 mi)		
20 April 1613	02:49:29	103	Partial	0.3839	—	61.5°S 154.4°W	—		
19 May 1613	17:43:36	141	Partial	0.0712	—	63.3°N 137.6°E	—		
13 October 1613	20:40:24	108	Partial	0.5902	—	61.3°N 58.2°W	—		
12 November 1613	06:12:15	146	Partial	0.2464	—	62.7°S 44.9°W	—		
9 April 1614	02:52:58	113	Annular	0.9411	06m 22s	25.7°S 156.2°E	268 km (167 mi)		
3 October 1614	12:04:51	118	Total	1.0282	02m 22s	25.2°N 13.5°E	113 km (70 mi)		
29 March 1615	07:03:24	123	Annular	0.9851	01m 28s	10.7°N 71.7°E	53 km (33 mi)		
22 September 1615	22:27:21	128	Annular	0.9784	02m 11s	9.1°S 163.5°W	78 km (48 mi)		
17 March 1616	18:21:45	133	Total	1.0279	01m 58s	48.0°N 131.4°W	180 km (110 mi)		
11 September 1616	01:44:06	138	Annular	0.9319	05m 42s	54.1°S 102.3°E	807 km (501 mi)		
6 February 1617	00:20:23	105	Partial	0.7750	—	62.2°S 59.0°W	—		
7 March 1617	10:05:36	143	Partial	0.0419	—	61.2°N 48.6°W	—		
1 August 1617	11:29:44	110	Partial	0.6756	—	62.7°N 138.3°E	—		
26 January 1618	13:46:44	115	Annular	0.9955	00m 23s	44.7°S 9.7°W	18 km (11 mi)		
21 July 1618	19:44:30	120	Total	1.0260	02m 13s	40.4°N 106.3°W	94 km (58 mi)		
15 January 1619	20:38:07	125	Annular	0.9422	07m 16s	8.1°S 130.4°W	220 km (140 mi)		
11 July 1619	10:29:59	130	Total	1.0718	06m 41s	1.3°S 18.6°E	255 km (158 mi)		
4 January 1620	20:51:05	135	Annular	0.9081	10m 13s	45.0°N 146.5°W	976 km (606 mi)		
31 May 1620	20:33:45	102	Partial	0.2783	—	67.8°N 58.5°E	—		
30 June 1620	03:46:25	140	Partial	0.7535	—	65.1°S 102.3°E	—		
24 November 1620	04:16:35	107	Partial	0.3212	—	68.5°S 50.6°W	—		
21 May 1621	08:53:44	112	Annular	0.9962	00m 18s	63.1°N 36.1°E	18 km (11 mi)		
13 November 1621	14:23:13	117	Total	1.0194	01m 28s	55.8°S 49.7°W	84 km (52 mi)		
10 May 1622	13:55:35	122	Annular	0.9531	06m 07s	13.5°N 28.8°W	172 km (107 mi)		
3 November 1622	05:34:48	127	Total	1.0544	05m 01s	10.7°S 93.7°E	180 km (110 mi)		
29 April 1623	14:16:00	132	Annular	0.9378	06m 54s	39.8°S 20.4°W	405 km (252 mi)		
23 October 1623	21:17:10	137	Total	1.0298	02m 31s	37.8°N 128.0°W	159 km (99 mi)		
19 March 1624	04:40:36	104	Partial	0.5288	—	72.0°N 23.5°E	—		
17 April 1624	17:16:18	142	Partial	0.0582	—	71.2°S 23.1°W	—		
12 September 1624	19:19:26	109	Partial	0.5133	—	72.0°S 171.5°E	—		
12 October 1624	08:53:55	147	Partial	0.0089	—	71.5°N 109.9°E	—		
8 March 1625	17:32:39	114	Total	1.0434	03m 50s	23.9°N 89.4°W	166 km (103 mi)		
1 September 1625	21:06:57	119	Annular	0.9380	07m 37s	24.2°S 146.4°W	274 km (170 mi)		
26 February 1626	09:37:26	124	Total	1.0535	04m 42s	19.7°S 42.7°E	180 km (110 mi)		
21 August 1626	21:47:42	129	Annular	0.9584	04m 54s	23.1°N 142.9°W	154 km (96 mi)		
16 February 1627	00:13:31	134	Hybrid	1.0040	00m 15s	72.3°S 130.9°W	34 km (21 mi)		
11 August 1627	04:17:14	139	Hybrid	1.0001	00m 00s	77.7°N 173.3°W	1 km (0.62 mi)		
6 January 1628	15:52:52	106	Partial	0.4739	—	67.4°N 59.2°W	—		
1 July 1628	10:50:39	111	Total	1.0692	05m 32s	40.3°S 20.0°E	501 km (311 mi)		
25 December 1628	15:08:47	116	Annular	0.9153	12m 02s	15.4°N 44.0°W	413 km (257 mi)		
21 June 1629	03:59:24	121	Total	1.0670	06m 20s	14.5°N 121.6°E	221 km (137 mi)		
14 December 1629	16:19:07	126	Annular	0.9513	05m 38s	27.6°S 66.2°W	179 km (111 mi)		
10 June 1630	17:41:07	131	Hybrid	1.0122	00m 55s	60.9°N 98.3°W	54 km (34 mi)		
4 December 1630	00:38:59	136	Hybrid	1.0017	00m 07s	68.7°S 139.6°E	9 km (5.6 mi)		
1 May 1631	09:39:23	103	Partial	0.2677	—	62.0°S 94.2°E	—		
31 May 1631	00:25:38	141	Partial	0.1996	—	64.1°N 27.6°E	—		
25 October 1631	05:04:15	108	Partial	0.5384	—	61.7°N 167.0°E	—		
23 November 1631	14:53:44	146	Partial	0.2723	—	63.5°S 175.4°E	—		
19 April 1632	09:54:30	113	Annular	0.9447	06m 03s	26.4°S 50.8°E	267 km (166 mi)		
13 October 1632	20:09:39	118	Total	1.0220	01m 55s	23.7°N 108.2°W	91 km (57 mi)		
8 April 1633	14:37:06	123	Annular	0.9913	00m 51s	12.4°N 41.2°W	31 km (19 mi)		
3 October 1633	06:00:37	128	Annular	0.9726	02m 48s	11.2°S 83.4°E	99 km (62 mi)		
29 March 1634	02:25:11	133	Total	1.0346	02m 24s	48.7°N 108.6°E	198 km (123 mi)		
22 September 1634	08:47:04	138	Annular	0.9300	06m 03s	51.5°S 2.3°E	572 km (355 mi)		
17 February 1635	08:57:24	105	Partial	0.7440	—	61.6°S 162.7°E	—		
18 March 1635	18:24:53	143	Partial	0.0973	—	61.1°N 177.7°E	—		
12 August 1635	18:20:10	110	Partial	0.5514	—	62.1°N 26.6°E	—		
6 February 1636	22:14:33	115	Annular	0.9943	00m 29s	41.6°S 134.7°W	23 km (14 mi)		
1 August 1636	02:58:15	120	Total	1.0275	02m 15s	41.5°N 148.9°E	103 km (64 mi)		
26 January 1637	04:48:32	125	Annular	0.9412	07m 12s	6.4°S 107.0°E	223 km (139 mi)		
21 July 1637	17:57:08	130	Total	1.0731	06m 37s	1.8°N 93.4°W	251 km (156 mi)		
15 January 1638	04:51:53	135	Annular	0.9090	10m 00s	44.0°N 88.9°W	907 km (564 mi)		
12 June 1638	03:55:44	102	Partial	0.1370	—	66.8°N 62.9°W	—		
11 July 1638	11:11:52	140	Partial	0.8917	—	64.2°S 19.0°W	—		
5 December 1638	12:36:35	107	Partial	0.3143	—	67.5°S 173.0°E	—		
4 January 1639	04:56:19	145	Partial	0.0009	—	64.6°N 80.0°E	—		
1 June 1639	15:55:16	112	Annular	0.9930	00m 31s	71.7°N 65.3°W	38 km (24 mi)		
24 November 1639	22:58:55	117	Total	1.0197	01m 27s	59.6°S 174.7°W	87 km (54 mi)		
20 May 1640	20:37:52	122	Annular	0.9533	06m 00s	20.4°N 130.2°W	171 km (106 mi)		
13 November 1640	14:11:19	127	Total	1.0522	04m 50s	14.8°S 35.8°W	173 km (107 mi)		
9 May 1641	21:01:19	132	Annular	0.9425	06m 56s	30.8°S 127.3°W	321 km (199 mi)		
3 November 1641	05:40:09	137	Total	1.0252	02m 15s	33.0°N 102.5°E	130 km (81 mi)		
30 March 1642	12:29:29	104	Partial	0.4668	—	71.9°N 108.0°W	—		
29 April 1642	00:29:43	142	Partial	0.1660	—	70.6°S 144.7°W	—		
24 September 1642	02:37:37	109	Partial	0.4199	—	72.1°S 47.6°E	—		
23 October 1642	16:48:36	147	Partial	0.0551	—	71.0°N 22.5°W	—		
20 March 1643	01:47:19	114	Total	1.0479	04m 02s	30.0°N 144.6°E	186 km (116 mi)		
13 September 1643	04:01:21	119	Annular	0.9343	07m 35s	32.3°S 106.3°E	307 km (191 mi)		
8 March 1644	18:02:43	124	Total	1.0555	04m 57s	14.0°S 84.7°W	186 km (116 mi)		
1 September 1644	04:45:28	129	Annular	0.9584	05m 00s	15.4°N 110.9°E	152 km (94 mi)		
26 February 1645	08:35:06	134	Hybrid	1.0043	00m 17s	66.7°S 94.3°E	34 km (21 mi)		
21 August 1645	11:34:18	139	Hybrid	1.0040	00m 16s	68.2°N 43.7°E	28 km (17 mi)		
16 January 1646	23:59:17	106	Partial	0.4574	—	68.5°N 167.8°E	—		
12 July 1646	18:18:19	111	Total	1.0658	04m 44s	53.2°S 98.0°W	834 km (518 mi)		
5 January 1647	23:10:59	116	Annular	0.9161	11m 50s	16.9°N 166.5°W	413 km (257 mi)		
2 July 1647	11:21:21	121	Total	1.0643	06m 15s	9.6°N 11.0°E	217 km (135 mi)		
26 December 1647	00:38:35	126	Annular	0.9535	05m 25s	27.4°S 170.6°E	170 km (110 mi)		
21 June 1648	00:43:22	131	Hybrid	1.0102	00m 49s	56.7°N 164.0°E	42 km (26 mi)		
14 December 1648	09:17:55	136	Hybrid	1.0035	00m 14s	70.9°S 19.6°E	18 km (11 mi)		
11 May 1649	16:22:04	103	Partial	0.1427	—	62.7°S 15.7°W	—		
10 June 1649	07:02:37	141	Partial	0.3345	—	65.0°N 81.5°W	—		
4 November 1649	13:35:08	108	Partial	0.4978	—	62.2°N 30.2°E	—		
3 December 1649	23:40:37	146	Partial	0.2896	—	64.4°S 34.1°E	—		
30 April 1650	16:48:49	113	Annular	0.9481	05m 43s	28.5°S 52.9°W	274 km (170 mi)		
25 October 1650	04:21:25	118	Total	1.0159	01m 26s	22.3°N 127.9°E	68 km (42 mi)		
19 April 1651	22:04:37	123	Annular	0.9976	00m 14s	13.7°N 152.4°W	8 km (5.0 mi)		
14 October 1651	13:40:56	128	Annular	0.9668	03m 27s	13.5°S 31.3°W	120 km (75 mi)		
8 April 1652	10:22:28	133	Total	1.0412	02m 49s	49.6°N 8.9°W	213 km (132 mi)		
2 October 1652	15:58:30	138	Annular	0.9275	06m 19s	51.2°S 102.7°W	497 km (309 mi)		
27 February 1653	17:28:50	105	Partial	0.7043	—	61.3°S 26.0°E	—		
29 March 1653	02:38:06	143	Partial	0.1622	—	61.2°N 45.6°E	—		
23 August 1653	01:17:26	110	Partial	0.4356	—	61.6°N 86.7°W	—		
21 September 1653	15:55:44	148	Partial	0.0324	—	61.0°S 149.7°W	—		
17 February 1654	06:36:38	115	Annular	0.9933	00m 34s	38.3°S 100.9°E	27 km (17 mi)		
12 August 1654	10:17:43	120	Total	1.0285	02m 16s	41.7°N 42.5°E	110 km (68 mi)		
6 February 1655	12:51:54	125	Annular	0.9408	07m 03s	4.3°S 14.0°W	224 km (139 mi)		
2 August 1655	01:28:36	130	Total	1.0735	06m 28s	3.7°N 154.0°E	247 km (153 mi)		
26 January 1656	12:48:10	135	Annular	0.9106	09m 38s	43.2°N 34.1°W	820 km (510 mi)		
21 July 1656	18:39:48	140	Total	1.0244	—	63.4°S 140.7°W	—		
15 December 1656	20:59:52	107	Partial	0.3102	—	66.4°S 36.3°E	—		
14 January 1657	13:08:11	145	Partial	0.0171	—	63.7°N 52.7°W	—		
11 June 1657	22:52:09	112	Annular	0.9888	00m 45s	80.5°N 153.7°W	73 km (45 mi)		
5 December 1657	07:39:36	117	Total	1.0205	01m 29s	62.1°S 61.3°E	91 km (57 mi)		
1 June 1658	03:11:38	122	Annular	0.9532	05m 49s	27.0°N 131.3°E	172 km (107 mi)		
24 November 1658	22:54:42	127	Total	1.0502	04m 40s	18.0°S 166.4°W	167 km (104 mi)		
21 May 1659	03:38:53	132	Annular	0.9469	06m 51s	22.2°S 129.2°E	264 km (164 mi)		
14 November 1659	14:10:08	137	Total	1.0208	01m 56s	29.2°N 28.2°W	106 km (66 mi)		
9 April 1660	20:10:11	104	Partial	0.3906	—	71.5°N 122.9°E	—		
9 May 1660	07:36:45	142	Partial	0.2868	—	69.7°S 95.9°E	—		
4 October 1660	10:03:43	109	Partial	0.3401	—	72.0°S 78.2°W	—		
3 November 1660	00:50:39	147	Partial	0.0898	—	70.3°N 156.2°W	—		
30 March 1661	09:55:24	114	Total	1.0524	04m 12s	36.7°N 20.2°E	209 km (130 mi)		
23 September 1661	11:02:34	119	Annular	0.9306	07m 29s	40.3°S 3.0°W	347 km (216 mi)		
20 March 1662	02:21:49	124	Total	1.0576	05m 12s	7.9°S 149.1°E	191 km (119 mi)		
12 September 1662	11:50:45	129	Annular	0.9581	05m 05s	7.9°N 2.6°E	153 km (95 mi)		
9 March 1663	16:48:41	134	Hybrid	1.0049	00m 21s	60.5°S 37.1°W	35 km (22 mi)		
1 September 1663	18:59:08	139	Hybrid	1.0065	00m 29s	58.6°N 78.9°W	38 km (24 mi)		
28 January 1664	08:02:31	106	Partial	0.4376	—	69.6°N 35.0°E	—		
23 July 1664	01:48:46	111	Partial	0.9581	—	68.8°S 134.7°E	—		
21 August 1664	08:58:23	149	Partial	0.0844	—	71.0°N 173.8°E	—		
16 January 1665	07:11:51	116	Annular	0.9174	11m 24s	19.1°N 71.2°E	409 km (254 mi)		
12 July 1665	18:44:06	121	Total	1.0611	06m 02s	3.9°N 100.6°W	211 km (131 mi)		
5 January 1666	08:58:51	126	Annular	0.9562	05m 07s	26.3°S 47.1°E	160 km (99 mi)		
2 July 1666	07:42:30	131	Hybrid	1.0075	00m 39s	51.4°N 64.4°E	29 km (18 mi)		
25 December 1666	17:59:16	136	Hybrid	1.0058	00m 24s	71.6°S 98.3°W	30 km (19 mi)		
22 May 1667	22:58:00	103	Partial	0.0102	—	63.5°S 124.0°W	—		
21 June 1667	13:36:07	141	Partial	0.4732	—	65.9°N 170.1°E	—		
15 November 1667	22:12:06	108	Partial	0.4667	—	62.9°N 108.2°W	—		
15 December 1667	08:29:59	146	Partial	0.3024	—	65.3°S 108.2°W	—		
10 May 1668	23:37:24	113	Annular	0.9510	05m 21s	32.3°S 155.4°W	296 km (184 mi)		
4 November 1668	12:40:05	118	Hybrid	1.0102	00m 57s	21.1°N 1.8°E	45 km (28 mi)		
30 April 1669	05:26:07	123	Hybrid	1.0036	00m 22s	14.1°N 98.2°E	13 km (8.1 mi)		
24 October 1669	21:28:05	128	Annular	0.9613	04m 07s	15.9°S 147.7°W	141 km (88 mi)		
19 April 1670	18:12:20	133	Total	1.0476	03m 15s	50.6°N 123.3°W	225 km (140 mi)		
13 October 1670	23:19:00	138	Annular	0.9247	06m 34s	52.4°S 149.1°E	467 km (290 mi)		
11 March 1671	01:50:58	105	Partial	0.6504	—	61.0°S 108.3°W	—		
9 April 1671	10:41:25	143	Partial	0.2423	—	61.4°N 84.1°W	—		
3 September 1671	08:23:57	110	Partial	0.3318	—	61.3°N 157.8°E	—		
2 October 1671	23:13:22	148	Partial	0.1177	—	61.0°S 92.1°E	—		
28 February 1672	14:50:43	115	Annular	0.9926	00m 38s	35.2°S 22.0°W	30 km (19 mi)		
22 August 1672	17:44:06	120	Total	1.0288	02m 15s	41.2°N 66.2°W	117 km (73 mi)		
16 February 1673	20:49:18	125	Annular	0.9409	06m 52s	1.8°S 133.5°W	223 km (139 mi)		
12 August 1673	09:04:05	130	Total	1.0731	06m 15s	4.6°N 40.6°E	242 km (150 mi)		
5 February 1674	20:41:35	135	Annular	0.9129	09m 09s	42.8°N 155.7°W	736 km (457 mi)		
2 August 1674	02:07:57	140	Total	1.0560	04m 08s	45.9°S 120.8°E	498 km (309 mi)		
27 December 1674	05:27:33	107	Partial	0.3108	—	65.4°S 100.9°W	—		
25 January 1675	21:19:48	145	Partial	0.0346	—	62.9°N 175.1°E	—		
23 June 1675	05:44:39	112	Annular	0.9835	01m 01s	84.1°N 166.1°W	154 km (96 mi)		
16 December 1675	16:24:03	117	Total	1.0218	01m 33s	63.1°S 62.0°W	97 km (60 mi)		
11 June 1676	09:42:37	122	Annular	0.9527	05m 38s	33.0°N 34.6°E	176 km (109 mi)		
5 December 1676	07:42:08	127	Total	1.0486	04m 30s	20.2°S 62.5°E	162 km (101 mi)		
31 May 1677	10:13:53	132	Annular	0.9510	06m 36s	14.4°S 27.5°E	223 km (139 mi)		
24 November 1677	22:44:03	137	Total	1.0166	01m 36s	26.3°N 159.6°W	84 km (52 mi)		
21 April 1678	03:45:50	104	Partial	0.3049	—	71.0°N 4.5°W	—		
20 May 1678	14:40:42	142	Partial	0.4158	—	68.8°S 22.1°W	—		
15 October 1678	17:36:58	109	Partial	0.2730	—	71.6°S 154.5°E	—		
14 November 1678	08:58:14	147	Partial	0.1148	—	69.4°N 69.4°E	—		
10 April 1679	17:55:13	114	Total	1.0565	04m 17s	43.8°N 102.2°W	233 km (145 mi)		
4 October 1679	18:13:56	119	Annular	0.9270	07m 21s	48.0°S 114.9°W	391 km (243 mi)		
30 March 1680	10:32:01	124	Total	1.0595	05m 25s	1.5°S 24.9°E	197 km (122 mi)		
22 September 1680	19:06:23	129	Annular	0.9578	05m 08s	0.7°N 108.2°W	153 km (95 mi)		
20 March 1681	00:52:59	134	Hybrid	1.0057	00m 26s	53.8°S 165.3°W	37 km (23 mi)		
12 September 1681	02:33:12	139	Hybrid	1.0083	00m 40s	49.8°N 161.1°E	43 km (27 mi)		
7 February 1682	15:59:21	106	Partial	0.4101	—	70.5°N 96.8°W	—		
3 August 1682	09:21:11	111	Partial	0.8246	—	69.7°S 9.5°E	—		
1 September 1682	16:42:24	149	Partial	0.1978	—	71.5°N 44.3°E	—		
27 January 1683	15:10:09	116	Annular	0.9195	10m 44s	22.1°N 50.6°W	401 km (249 mi)		
24 July 1683	02:07:00	121	Total	1.0569	05m 38s	2.5°S 147.1°E	203 km (126 mi)		
16 January 1684	17:18:53	126	Annular	0.9596	04m 43s	24.2°S 76.7°W	147 km (91 mi)		
12 July 1684	14:40:35	131	Hybrid	1.0041	00m 23s	45.2°N 37.1°W	16 km (9.9 mi)		
5 January 1685	02:42:50	136	Hybrid	1.0086	00m 35s	70.7°S 143.1°E	44 km (27 mi)		
1 July 1685	20:06:07	141	Partial	0.6163	—	66.9°N 62.2°E	—		
26 November 1685	06:54:43	108	Partial	0.4442	—	63.7°N 111.8°E	—		
25 December 1685	17:22:35	146	Partial	0.3102	—	66.4°S 108.3°E	—		
22 May 1686	06:21:20	113	Annular	0.9533	04m 56s	38.6°S 103.3°E	353 km (219 mi)		
15 November 1686	21:05:00	118	Hybrid	1.0048	00m 28s	20.2°N 126.0°W	22 km (14 mi)		
11 May 1687	12:42:28	123	Hybrid	1.0094	00m 57s	13.6°N 9.9°W	33 km (21 mi)		
5 November 1687	05:22:24	128	Annular	0.9561	04m 49s	18.3°S 94.3°E	160 km (99 mi)		
30 April 1688	01:57:34	133	Total	1.0535	03m 40s	51.4°N 124.4°E	234 km (145 mi)		
24 October 1688	06:46:41	138	Annular	0.9221	06m 49s	54.4°S 39.2°E	453 km (281 mi)		
21 March 1689	10:06:42	105	Partial	0.5867	—	61.0°S 119.0°E	—		
19 April 1689	18:39:23	143	Partial	0.3312	—	61.7°N 147.5°E	—		
13 September 1689	15:39:22	110	Partial	0.2394	—	61.1°N 40.2°E	—		
13 October 1689	06:40:02	148	Partial	0.1920	—	61.2°S 28.3°W	—		
10 March 1690	22:56:00	115	Annular	0.9920	00m 42s	32.5°S 143.0°W	33 km (21 mi)		
3 September 1690	01:17:47	120	Total	1.0287	02m 13s	40.3°N 177.4°W	122 km (76 mi)		
28 February 1691	04:37:41	125	Annular	0.9414	06m 40s	0.8°N 109.3°E	220 km (140 mi)		
23 August 1691	16:45:57	130	Total	1.0720	06m 01s	4.5°N 74.3°W	236 km (147 mi)		
17 February 1692	04:26:56	135	Annular	0.9159	08m 36s	42.4°N 85.6°E	644 km (400 mi)		
12 August 1692	09:41:05	140	Total	1.0546	04m 10s	39.8°S 8.6°E	353 km (219 mi)		
6 January 1693	13:55:33	107	Partial	0.3097	—	64.4°S 122.2°E	—		
5 February 1693	05:27:09	145	Partial	0.0597	—	62.2°N 44.2°E	—		
3 July 1693	12:33:52	112	Partial	0.9718	—	64.8°N 146.3°E	—		
27 December 1693	01:10:50	117	Total	1.0236	01m 39s	62.6°S 174.3°E	105 km (65 mi)		
22 June 1694	16:08:45	122	Annular	0.9517	05m 27s	38.4°N 59.7°W	183 km (114 mi)		
16 December 1694	16:33:11	127	Total	1.0475	04m 22s	21.3°S 69.2°W	158 km (98 mi)		
11 June 1695	16:44:24	132	Annular	0.9545	06m 13s	7.4°S 72.2°W	193 km (120 mi)		
6 December 1695	07:23:18	137	Total	1.0128	01m 16s	24.3°N 67.9°E	64 km (40 mi)		
1 May 1696	11:15:19	104	Partial	0.2078	—	70.2°N 129.8°W	—		
30 May 1696	21:41:23	142	Partial	0.5534	—	67.8°S 138.7°W	—		
26 October 1696	01:17:07	109	Partial	0.2172	—	70.9°S 25.9°E	—		
24 November 1696	17:10:41	147	Partial	0.1318	—	68.4°N 65.6°W	—		
21 April 1697	01:49:22	114	Total	1.0602	04m 18s	51.4°N 136.9°E	262 km (163 mi)		
15 October 1697	01:33:41	119	Annular	0.9236	07m 12s	55.5°S 131.2°E	441 km (274 mi)		
10 April 1698	18:34:26	124	Total	1.0613	05m 36s	5.1°N 97.3°W	201 km (125 mi)		
4 October 1698	02:31:25	129	Annular	0.9573	05m 10s	6.2°S 138.8°E	155 km (96 mi)		
31 March 1699	08:48:45	134	Hybrid	1.0065	00m 32s	46.8°S 69.7°E	38 km (24 mi)		
23 September 1699	10:16:12	139	Hybrid	1.0095	00m 49s	41.8°N 40.7°E	46 km (29 mi)		
18 February 1700	23:49:35	106	Partial	0.3744	—	71.2°N 132.4°E	—		
14 August 1700	16:59:06	111	Partial	0.7000	—	70.6°S 117.5°W	—		
13 September 1700	00:34:18	149	Partial	0.2996	—	71.9°N 87.6°W	—		
