= 1739 =

1739 in various calendars
- Gregorian calendar: 1739; MDCCXXXIX
- Ab urbe condita: 2492
- Armenian calendar: 1188; ԹՎ ՌՃՁԸ
- Assyrian calendar: 6489
- Balinese saka calendar: 1660–1661
- Bengali calendar: 1145–1146
- Berber calendar: 2689
- British Regnal year: 12 Geo. 2 – 13 Geo. 2
- Buddhist calendar: 2283
- Burmese calendar: 1101
- Byzantine calendar: 7247–7248
- Chinese calendar: 戊午年 (Earth Horse); 4436 or 4229 — to — 己未年 (Earth Goat); 4437 or 4230
- Coptic calendar: 1455–1456
- Discordian calendar: 2905
- Ethiopian calendar: 1731–1732
- Hebrew calendar: 5499–5500
- Hindu calendars
- Vikram Samvat: 1795–1796
- Shaka Samvat: 1660–1661
- Kali Yuga: 4839–4840
- Holocene calendar: 11739
- Igbo calendar: 739–740
- Iranian calendar: 1117–1118
- Islamic calendar: 1151–1152
- Japanese calendar: Genbun 4 (元文４年)
- Javanese calendar: 1663–1664
- Julian calendar: Gregorian minus 11 days
- Korean calendar: 4072
- Minguo calendar: 173 before ROC 民前173年
- Nanakshahi calendar: 271
- Thai solar calendar: 2281–2282
- Tibetan calendar: ས་ཕོ་རྟ་ལོ་ (male Earth-Horse); 1865 or 1484 or 712 — to — ས་མོ་ལུག་ལོ་ (female Earth-Sheep); 1866 or 1485 or 713

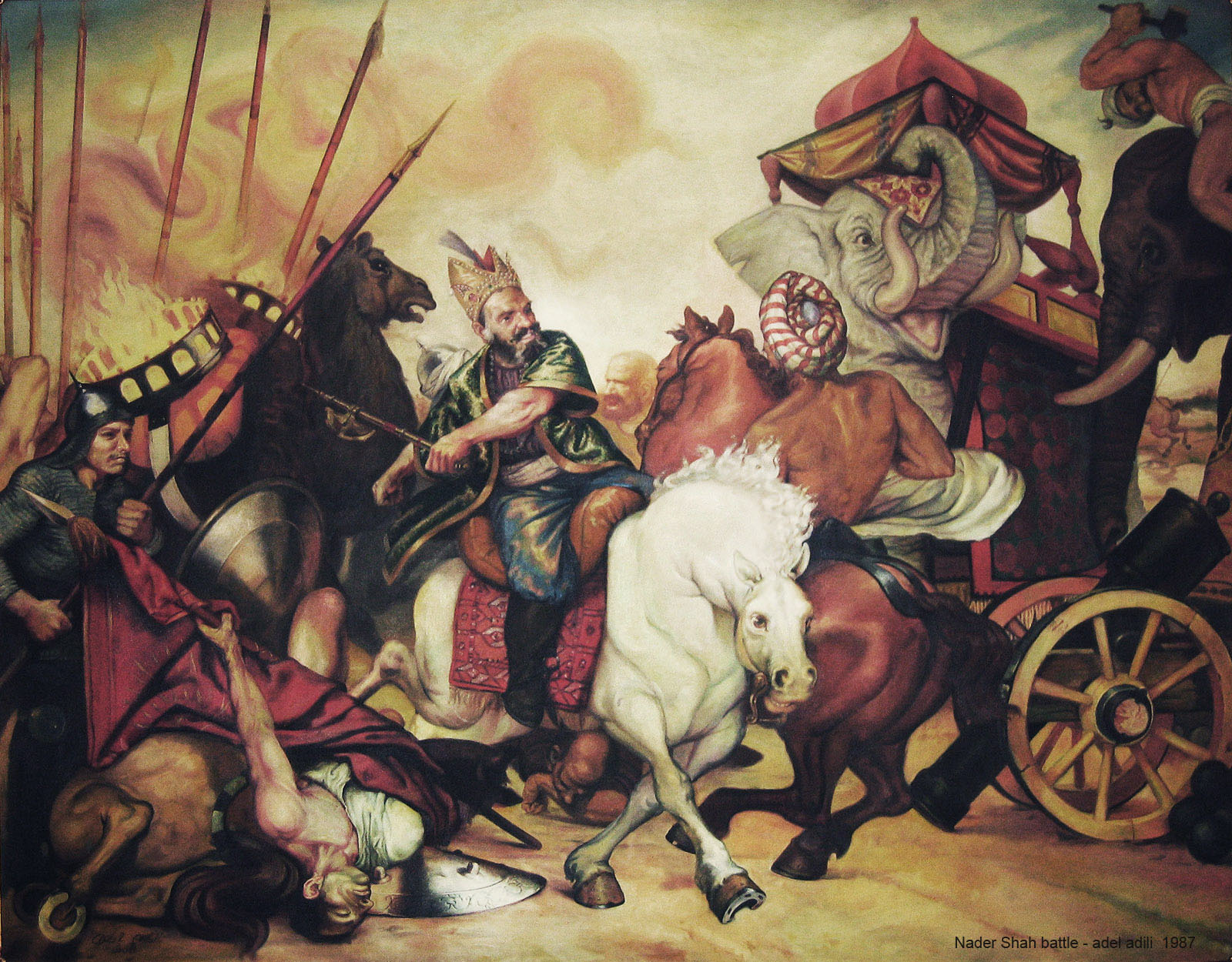
February 24: Persian Empire troops invade Delhi and defeat Mughal Empire in Indian Battle of Karnal.

1739 (MDCCXXXIX) was a common year starting on Thursday of the Gregorian calendar and a common year starting on Monday of the Julian calendar, the 1739th year of the Common Era (CE) and Anno Domini (AD) designations, the 739th year of the 2nd millennium, the 39th year of the 18th century, and the 10th and last year of the 1730s decade. As of the start of 1739, the Gregorian calendar was 11 days ahead of the Julian calendar, which remained in localized use until 1923.

== Events ==
=== January–March ===
- January 1 – Bouvet Island is discovered by French explorer Jean-Baptiste Charles Bouvet de Lozier, in the South Atlantic Ocean.
- January 3 – A 7.6 earthquake shakes the Ningxia Hui Autonomous Region in China killing 50,000 people.
- February 24 – Battle of Karnal: The army of Iranian ruler Nader Shah defeats the forces of the Mughal emperor of India, Muhammad Shah.
- March 20 – Nader Shah occupies Delhi, India and sacks the city, stealing the jewels of the Peacock Throne, including the Koh-i-Noor.

=== April–June ===
- April 7 – English highwayman Dick Turpin is executed by hanging for horse theft.
- May 12 – John Wesley lays the foundation stone of the New Room, Bristol in England, the world's first Methodist meeting house.
- June 13 – (June 2 Old Style); The Royal Swedish Academy of Sciences is founded in Stockholm, Sweden.

=== July–September ===
- July 9 – The first group purporting to represent an all-England cricket team, consisting of 11 players from various parts of England, comes to Kent and loses to the renowned Kent team, led by Lord John Sackville.
- July 12 – The British East India Company signs a treaty with the Maratha Empire to gain the right of free trade within the territory.
- July 22 – The Ottoman Empire retakes Belgrade from Austria's Habsburg monarchy after winning the Battle of Grocka.
- August 20 – The Viceroyalty of New Granada, incorporating modern-day Colombia, Ecuador, and Venezuela is re-established by the royal cedula of King Philip V of Spain, 16 years after it had been dissolved, and adds the territory of Panama as well.
- September 9 – The Stono Rebellion, a slave rebellion, erupts near Charleston, South Carolina.
- September 18 – The Treaty of Belgrade brings the Austro-Russian–Turkish War (1735–39) to an end.

=== October–December ===
- October 3 – The Treaty of Niš is signed.
- October 12 – The town of Utuado, Puerto Rico was founded by Sebastian de Morfi.
- October 17 – The Foundling Hospital is created in London by royal charter.
- October 23 – War of Jenkins' Ear: Great Britain declares war on Spain.
- November 20–22 – War of Jenkins' Ear – Battle of Porto Bello: British marine forces capture the Panamanian silver-exporting town of Portobelo from the Spanish.
- December 30– Months of unseasonably cold weather begin in Ireland, precipitating the Irish Famine of 1740, known as Bliain an Áir ("The Year of Slaughter"). A January 5 dispatch from Dublin to the Stamford Mercury says "Since last Wednesday we have had the most violent cold Weather that was ever known in this Kingdom; hard Frost began that evening, which has continued ever since with a very stormy Wind at South-East." At least 13% of Ireland's population dies of starvation in the year that follows.

=== Date unknown ===
- Ecuador, part of Real Audiencia of Quito, becomes a part of New Granada, instead of Peru.
- 84,000 farmers revolt in the province of Iwaki in Japan.
- A Plinian eruption of Mount Tarumae volcano occurs in Japan.
- The first Bible in Estonian is published.

== Births ==
- January 25 – Charles François Dumouriez, French general (d. 1823)
- February 15 – Alexandre-Théodore Brongniart, French architect (d. 1813)
- March 16 – George Clymer, American politician and Founding Father (d. 1813)
- March 19 – Charles-François Lebrun, duc de Plaisance, Third Consul of France (d. 1824)
- August 31 – Johann Augustus Eberhard, German theologian, philosopher (d. 1809)
- September 12 – Mary Bosanquet Fletcher, Methodist preacher and philanthropist (d. 1816)
- October 11 – Grigory Potemkin, Russian military leader, statesman, nobleman and favourite of Catherine the Great (d. 1791)
- November 2 – Carl Ditters von Dittersdorf, Austrian composer (d. 1799)
- November 8 – Henrik Gabriel Porthan, Finnish professor and historian (d. 1804)
- November 20 – Jean-François de La Harpe, French critic (d. 1803)
- December 14 – Pierre Samuel du Pont de Nemours, French politician (d. 1817)
- date unknown
  - Antonio Cachia, Maltese architect, engineer and archaeologist (d. 1813)
  - Bénédict Chastanier, French surgeon (d. 1816)
  - Margherita Dalmet, Venetian dogaressa (d. 1817)
  - Paul François Ignace de Barlatier de Mas, French naval captain (d. 1807)
  - Samuel Mason, Revolutionary War soldier, early American outlaw (d. 1803)
  - Karoline Kaulla, German banker (d. 1809)
  - Yelizaveta Belogradskaya, Russian singer and musician

== Deaths ==
- January 20 – Francesco Galli Bibiena, Italian architect/designer (b. 1659)
- March 5 – John Joseph of the Cross, Italian saint (b. 1654)
- March 7 – Anton Maria Maragliano, Italian artist (b. 1664)

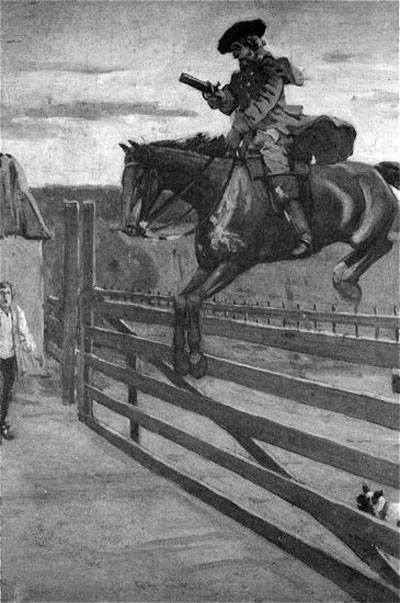
Dick Turpin

- April 7 – Dick Turpin, English highwayman (hanged) (b. 1705)
- April 19 – Nicholas Saunderson, English scientist and mathematician (b. 1682)
- May 10 – Cosmas Damian Asam, German painter and architect during the late Baroque period (b. 1686)
- June 18 – Charles Frederick, Duke of Holstein-Gottorp, Swedish nobleman (b. 1700)
- June 20 – Edmond Martène, French Benedictine historian and liturgist (b. 1654)
- July 24 – Benedetto Marcello, Italian composer (b. 1686)
- September 8 – Yuri Troubetzkoy, Governor of Belgorod (b. 1668)
- September 12 – Ernest Louis, Landgrave of Hesse-Darmstadt (b. 1667)
- September 19 – Anne Marie Louise de La Tour d'Auvergne, French princess (b. 1722)
- October 6 – Françoise Charlotte d'Aubigné, French noble (b. 1684)
- October 18 – Antônio José da Silva, Brazilian-born dramatist (b. 1705)
- November 14 – Juan de Galavís, Spanish Catholic archbishop (b. 1683)
- November 16 – Harry Grey, 3rd Earl of Stamford, English peer (b. 1685)
- date unknown – Anne Dodd, English news seller, pamphlet shop proprietor (b. 1685)
