= Continuum (measurement) =

Set of theories or models

Continuum (pl.: continua or continuums) theories or models explain variation as involving gradual quantitative transitions without abrupt changes or discontinuities. In contrast, categorical theories or models explain variation using qualitatively different states.

== In physics ==
In physics, for example, the space-time continuum model describes space and time as part of the same continuum rather than as separate entities. A spectrum in physics, such as the electromagnetic spectrum, is often termed as either continuous (with energy at all wavelengths) or discrete (energy at only certain wavelengths).

In contrast, quantum mechanics uses quanta, certain defined amounts (i.e. categorical amounts) which are distinguished from continuous amounts.

== In mathematics and philosophy ==
A good introduction to the philosophical issues involved is John Lane Bell's essay in the Stanford Encyclopedia of Philosophy. A significant divide is provided by the law of excluded middle. It determines the divide between intuitionistic continua such as Brouwer's and Lawvere's, and classical ones such as Stevin's and Robinson's. Bell isolates two distinct historical conceptions of infinitesimal, one by Leibniz and one by Nieuwentijdt, and argues that Leibniz's conception was implemented in Robinson's hyperreal continuum, whereas Nieuwentijdt's, in Lawvere's smooth infinitesimal analysis, characterized by the presence of nilsquare infinitesimals: "It may be said that Leibniz recognized the need for the first, but not the second type of infinitesimal and Nieuwentijdt, vice versa. It is of interest to note that Leibnizian infinitesimals (differentials) are realized in nonstandard analysis, and nilsquare infinitesimals in smooth infinitesimal analysis".

== In social sciences, psychology and psychiatry ==
In social sciences in general, psychology and psychiatry included, data about differences between individuals, like any data, can be collected and measured using different levels of measurement. Those levels include dichotomous (a person either has a personality trait or not) and non-dichotomous approaches. While the non-dichotomous approach allows for understanding that everyone lies somewhere on a particular personality dimension, the dichotomous (nominal categorical and ordinal) approaches only seek to confirm that a particular person either has or does not have a particular mental disorder.

Expert witnesses particularly are trained to help courts in translating the data into the legal (e.g. 'guilty' vs. 'not guilty') dichotomy, which apply to law, sociology and ethics.

== In linguistics ==
In linguistics, the range of dialects spoken over a geographical area that differ slightly between neighboring areas is known as a dialect continuum. A language continuum is a similar description for the merging of neighboring languages without a clear defined boundary. Examples of dialect or language continuums include the varieties of Italian or German; and the Romance languages, Arabic languages, or Bantu languages.
