= Battle of Shklow =

1654 battle

- Part of Russo-Polish War (1654–1667) and Tsar Alexei's campaign of 1654–1655
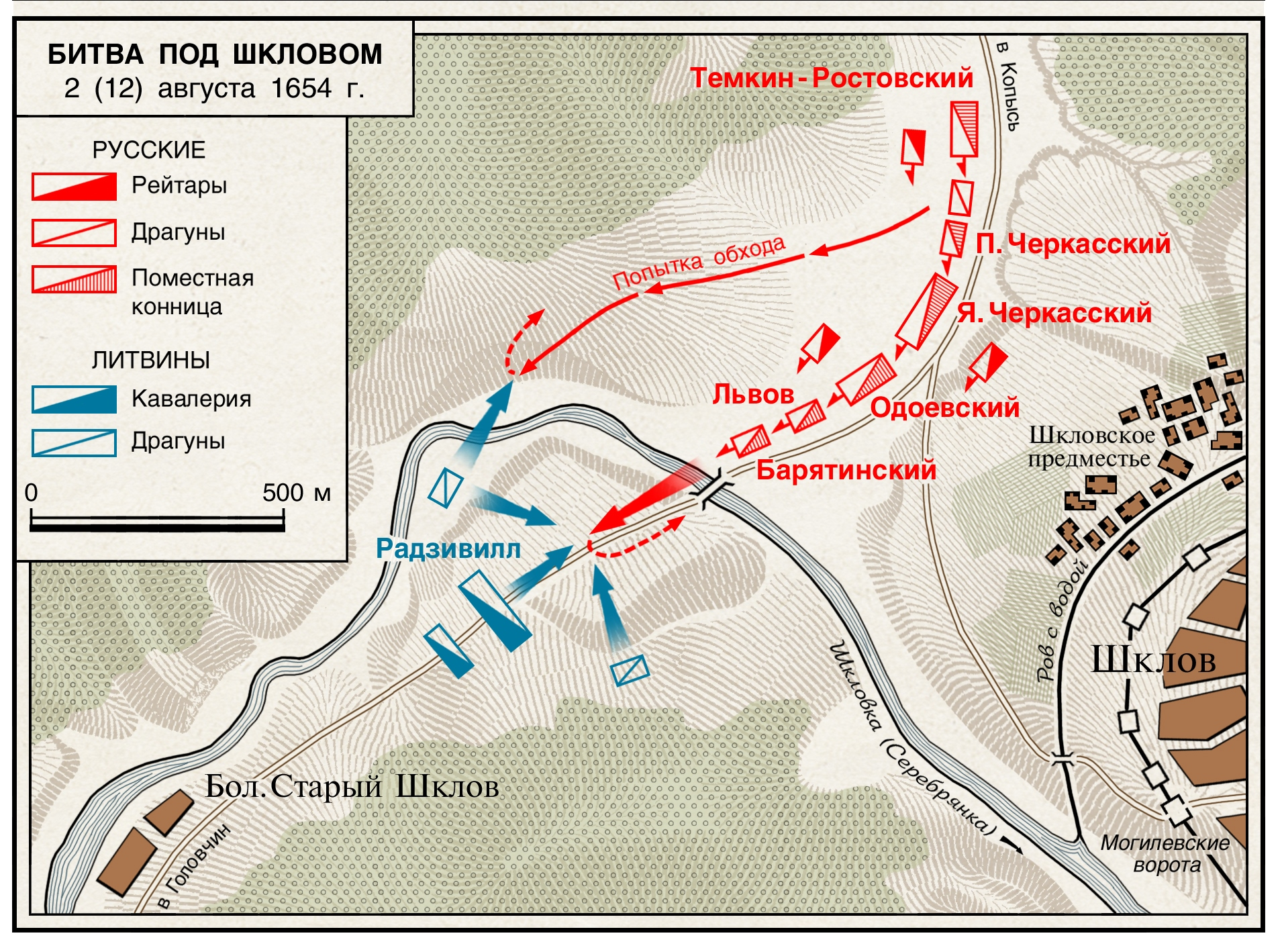
Date	August 12, 1654
Location	Shkloŭ, present-day Belarus
Result	Both sides claim victory

Belligerents
Polish–Lithuanian Commonwealth	Russian Tsardom

Commanders and leaders
Janusz Radziwiłł	Yakov Cherkassky; Yury Baryatinsky

Strength
6,000–8,000	71,000 in all armies: 12,000 to 41,000 in the engaged army (including Cherkassky, Odoevsky, and Temkin-Rostovsky)

Casualties and losses
700 (Polish claim)	3,000–7,000 (Polish claim) Several hundreds killed and wounded (Russian claim)

The Battle of Shklov (also spelt Shklow, Szkłów, or Shkloŭ) took place on August 12, 1654, and was one of the first battles of the Russo-Polish War (1654–67); it ended indecisively, with both sides claiming victory. A small Polish–Lithuanian force of about 6,000–7,000 under Great Lithuanian Hetman Janusz Radziwiłł surprised a numerically superior Russian force (of 40,000; some estimates speak of 70,000, but they are likely too high) under knyaz Yakov Cherkassky near Shklow (Polish: Szkłów). The battle took place during a solar eclipse. The Russian forces, due to their surprise, were engaged by the Poles unprepared and in smaller portions, which were defeated in turn. Eventually the Poles forced the entire Russian army to retreat; the losses are estimated at 700 for the Poles and 7,000 for the Russians (although they may be overestimated for both sides).

== Prelude ==
The conflict was triggered by the Khmelnytsky Rebellion of Ukrainian Cossacks against the Polish–Lithuanian Commonwealth. The Cossack leader, Bohdan Khmelnytsky, derived his main foreign support from Alexis of Russia and promised his allegiance in recompense. Although the Zemsky Sobor of 1651 was poised to accept the Cossacks into the Moscow sphere of influence and to enter the war against Poland on their side, the Tsar waited until 1653, when a new popular assembly eventually authorized the unification of Ukraine with Tsardom of Russia. After the Cossacks ratified this agreement at the Pereyaslav Rada the Russo-Polish War became inevitable.

In July 1654 the Russian army of 40,000 (nominally under the Tsar, but in fact commanded by Princes Yakov Cherkassky, Nikita Odoevsky and Mikhail Temkin-Rostovsky) captured the border forts of Bely and Dorogobuzh and laid siege to Smolensk. The Russian position at Smolensk was endangered as long as Great Lithuanian Hetman, Prince Janusz Radziwiłł with 10,000 men held Orsha, slightly to the west. Cherkassky decided to seek out Radziwiłł and defeat him.

The Russian army which besieged Smolensk didn't risk a storm of the city as long as a Lithuanian army of Janusz Radziwiłł operated in the east. It was decided to send an army towards Radziwiłł which was supposed to block him. The army led by Yakov Cherkassky took Orsha and faced the Lithuanian forces.

== Battle ==
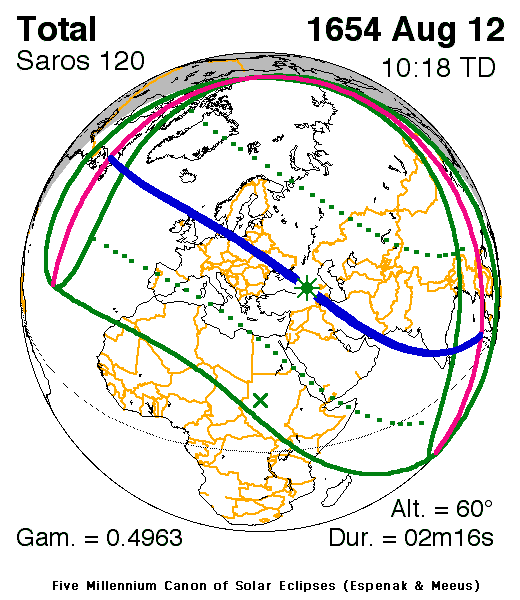
Solar eclipse of August 12, 1654 passed right through Ukraine

The battle is described quite differently in Polish and Russian accounts, each side claiming it as their victory.

According to Polish account, Radziwiłł became aware that the Russian army would be crossing the Dniepr river; he had about 2,000 cavalry and some few thousands of infantry (including the more mobile dragoons; about 4,000–5,000). Around 2 pm he was informed that the Russians were close and their first units had started to cross the river; his main force also had the benefit of not being seen by the Russians. In the meantime, a solar eclipse began, creating confusion. Polish cavalry, including the Winged Hussars, launched repeated attacks on the Russian forces that had crossed the river, pushing them back. Russian attempts to cross the river were repeatedly forced back into the water, and attempts to outflank the Polish forces were stopped by the infantry, which took positions along the river and fired at the Russian forces which attempted to cross the river elsewhere. After five or so hours, both sides attempted a major push, and the Poles again were victorious; the Russians, having sustained much higher casualties than the Poles (about 7,000 compared to 700), were demoralized and abandoned attempts to cross the river. The same source claims that among their dead was knyaz Yury Baryatinsky which is obviously wrong.

Russian sources give a different account. According to them, after having discovered the Lithuanian army, a detachment under Prince Yury Baryatinsky was involved in the fighting with the Lithuanians while the voivodes of the main army led by Cherkassky sent Baryatinski their cavalry as reinforcement. The rest of the army which consisted of infantry, reiters and supply wagons, also began to move to the battle site. Baryatinsky conducted several attacks on the army of the Great Hetman. Having learned about the approach of the main army of Cherkassky, Radziwiłł decided to retreat. Cherkassky didn't pursue the Lithuanians.

== Significance ==
Szkłów was the last (if dubious) victory of Janusz Radziwiłł, a powerful and ambitious magnate. Cherkassky retreated temporarily but only to merge with another Russian army under Aleksey Trubetskoy; later that month Radziwiłł would face defeat at the battle of Szepielewicze (Shepeleviche). That battle would mark Russian victory in Lithuania. Shklov was taken by the Russians in September 1654. The besieged Polish–Lithuanian garrison of Smolensk found itself in an isolated situation and lost its hopes to hold out until reinforcements could arrive. This forced the garrison to surrender (see Siege of Smolensk (1654)). A few months later Janusz Radziwiłł would defect from Polish side to that of the invading Swedes, and would eventually die fighting for them, remembered as a traitor in Polish historiography.
