= Thomas Fuller (writer) =

English physician, writer and preacher

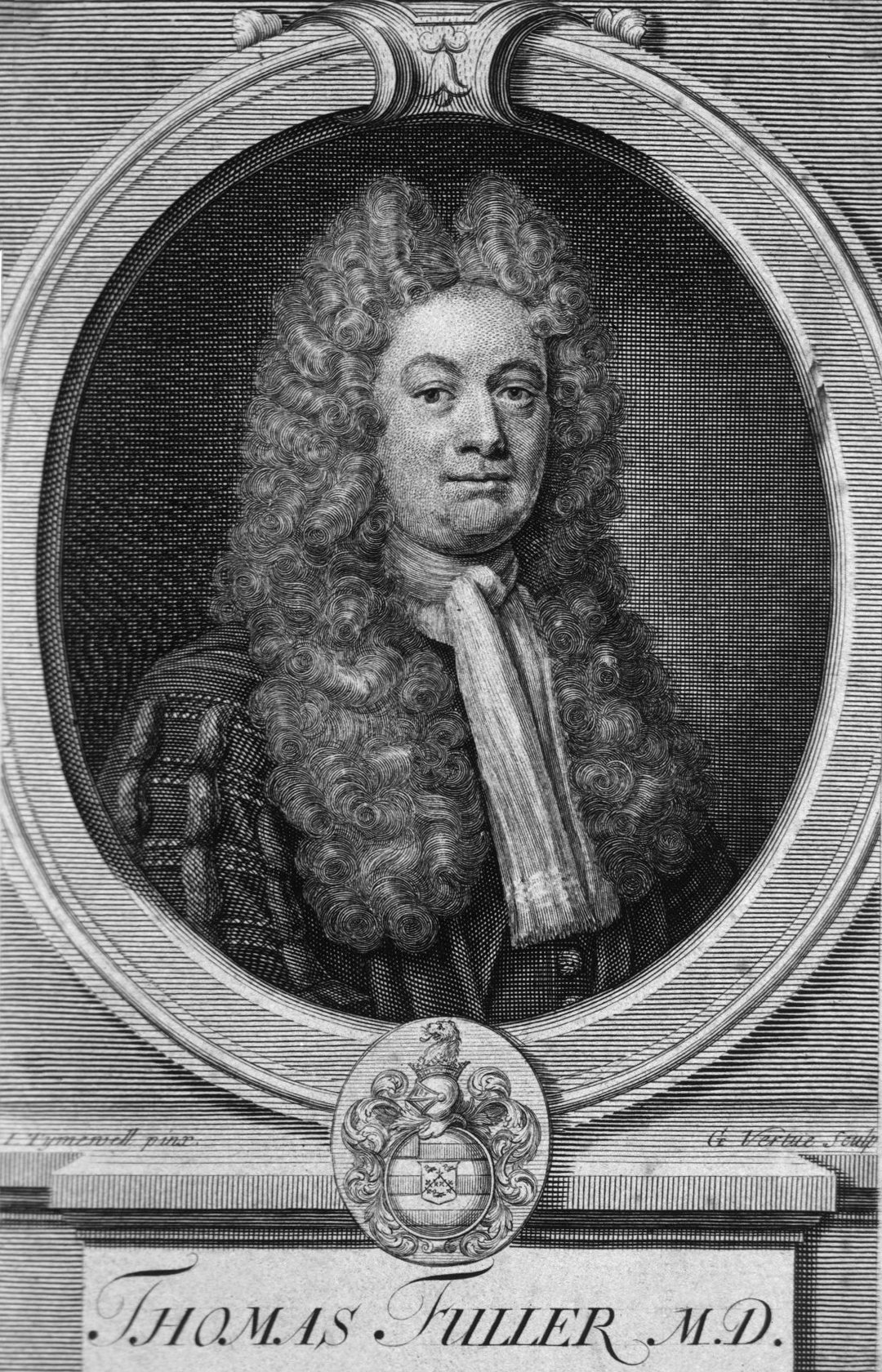
Portrait of Fuller

Thomas Fuller (24 June 1654 – 17 September 1734) was an English physician, writer and preacher. Fuller was born in Rosehill, Sussex, and educated at Queens' College, Cambridge. He practised medicine at Sevenoaks. In 1723 he published Pharmacopoeia Domestica, and in 1730 Exanthematologia, Or, An Attempt to Give a Rational Account of Eruptive Fevers, Especially of the Measles and Small Pox. In 1732 he published a compilation of proverbs titled Gnomologia: Adagies and Proverbs; wise sentences and witty sayings, ancient and modern, foreign and British (321 pp., London: Barker and Bettesworth Hitch) which includes the words, "Be you never so high, the law is above you".

== Works ==
- Pharmacopœia Extemporanea: or, a body of medicines, containing a thousand select prescripts, answering most intentions of cure. To which are added useful scholia, a catalog of remedies, and copious index, for the assistance of young physicians.
- Introductio ad Prudentiam: or, Directions, Counsels, and Cautions, Tending to Prudent Management of Affairs in Common Life.
