= Friedrich von Canitz =

German poet and diplomat

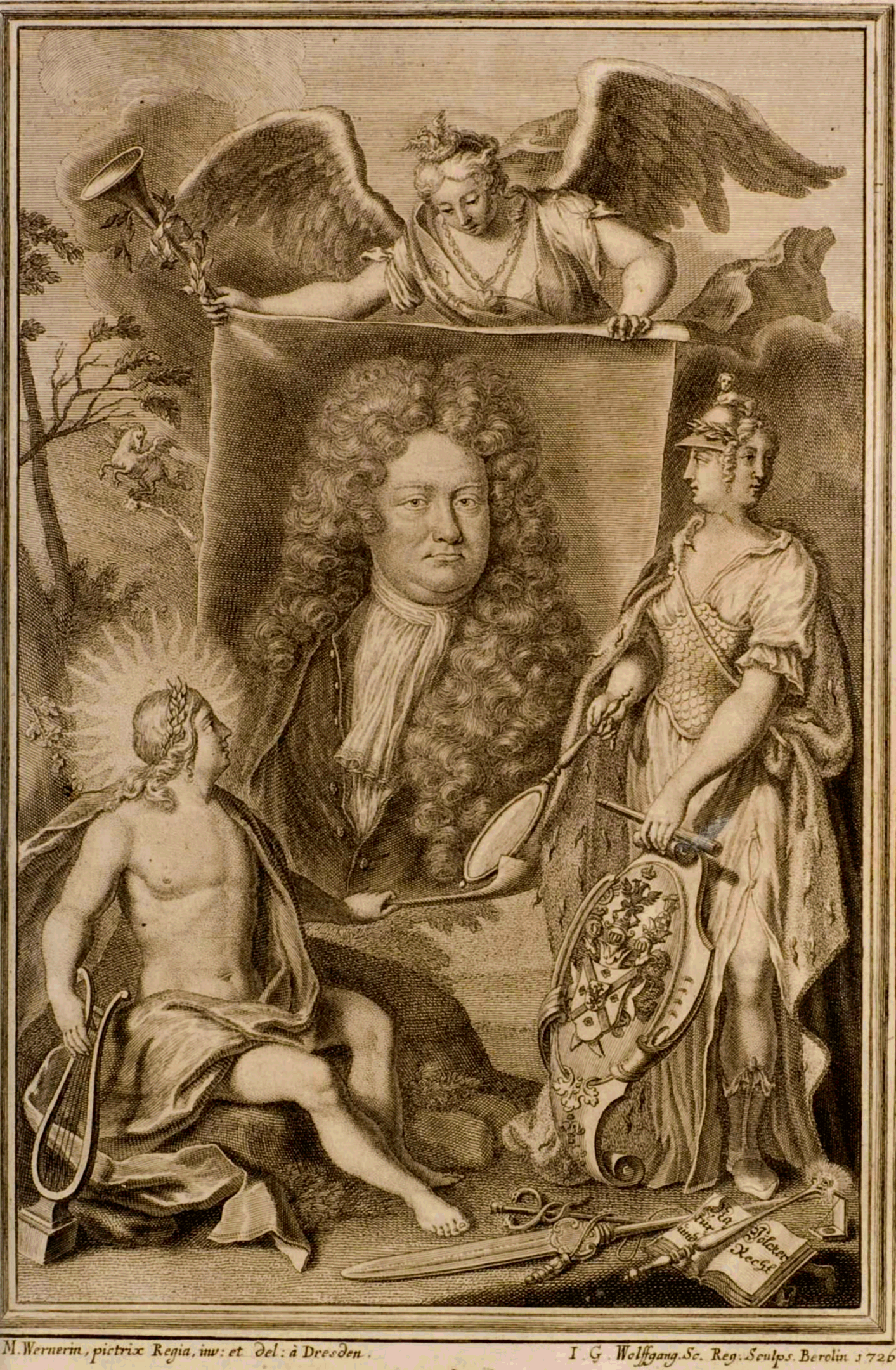
- Friedrich von Canitz; by Johann Georg Wolfgang
- Born: 27 November 1654; Berlin
- Died: 11 August 1699 (aged 44)
- Occupations: poet and diplomat

Friedrich Rudolf Ludwig Freiherr von Canitz (27 November 1654 – 11 August 1699) was a German poet and diplomat. He was one of the few German poets of his era that Frederick the Great enjoyed.

== Biography ==
Canitz was born in Berlin, Brandenburg. He was influenced by Boileau. He attended the universities of Leiden and Leipzig, travelled in England, France, Italy and the Netherlands, and on his return was appointed groom of the bedchamber (Kammerjunker) to Frederick William, Elector of Brandenburg, whom he accompanied on his campaigns in Pomerania and Sweden.

In 1680 Canitz became councillor of legation, and he was employed on various embassies. In 1697 Elector Frederick III made him a privy councillor, and Emperor Leopold I created him a baron of the Empire. Having fallen ill on an embassy to the Hague, he obtained his discharge and died at Berlin in 1699.

He wrote verse in a restrained, sober style. He was considered as one of the poets who “produced verse that was specifically aimed at entertaining and flattering princes and high courtiers.” Although he liked making verse in many languages, he never published any of them. Canitz's poems (Nebenstunden unterschiedener Gedichte), which did not appear until after his death (1700), are for the most part dry and stilted imitations of French and Latin models, but they formed a healthy contrast to the coarseness and bombast of the later Silesian poets.

A complete edition of Canitz's poems was published by U. König in 1727; see also L. Fulda, Die Gegner der zweiten schlesischen Schule, ii. (1883).
