= Joan de Cabanas =

Provence Occitan language writer

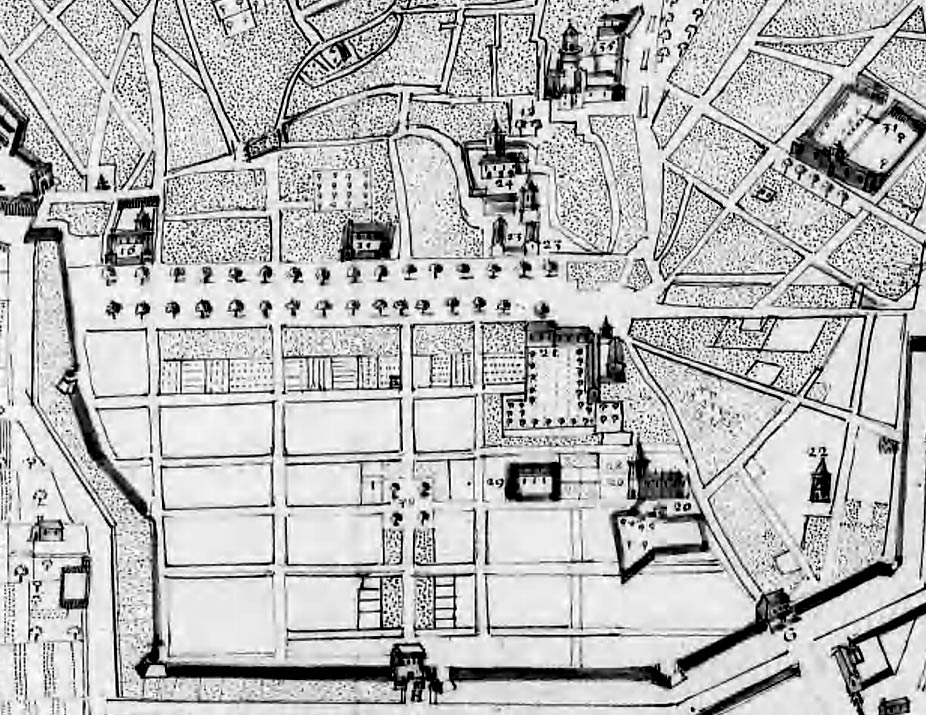
Ais en Provence in 1666

Joan de Cabanas (in French Jean de Cabannes or Jean de Cabanes, March 28, 1654 – February 26, 1711) was an Occitan language writer from Provence.

== Life ==
De Cabanas was the second son of a lawyer, born in Aix en Provence in 1654. As he was not his father's heir, Cabanas had to serve in the Duc of Savoy's army. However, after the death of his elder brother he became the heir and retired without any need to earn a living. He could then spend as much time as he wanted in order to compose his literary work.

== Literary work ==
Cabanas wrote a hundred tales (explicitly inspired from Marguerite de Navarre's Heptaméron), comedies and poetic enigmas. All de Cabanes' literary work remained at the stage of manuscripts and were never published. Occitan critic Philippe Gardy thoroughly studied and published some of them at the end of 20th century.

== Bibliography ==
=== Editions ===
- Cabanas, Joan de. L'Historien Sincere. Aix en Provence : Pontier, 1808 .
- Cabanas, Joan de - Jean de Cabanes- . Enigmos, Édition établie par Philippe Gardy. Letras d'òc, 2007.
- Gardy, Philippe. Un conteur provençal au XVIIIe siècle : Jean de Cabanes. Aix en Provence : Edisud, 1982 (including some of Cabanas's tales).

=== Critics ===
- Anatole, Christian - Lafont, Robert. Nouvelle histoire de la littérature occitane, Tome II. Paris : P.U.F., 1970.
- Gardy, Philippe. Histoire de la littérature occitane, Tome II, L'âge du baroque - 1520 - 1789 (193 - 212). Montpellier : Presses du Languedoc, 1997.
