= Andreas Acoluthus =

German scholar

Andreas Acoluthus (German: [anˈdʁeːas ʔakoˈluːtʊs]; 16 March 1654 – 4 November 1704) was a German scholar of orientalism and professor of theology at Breslau (Wrocław). A native of Bernstadt (Bierutów), Lower Silesia, he was the son of Johannes Acoluthus, pastor of St. Elisabeth and superintendent of the churches and schools of Breslau.

== Early life and education ==
He attended the school of St. Elisabeth in Breslau and was in taught by August Pfeiffer in: Rabbinic, Arabic, Persian, Syriac and Ethiopian. He later also learned Mauritanian, Turkish, Coptic, Armenian and Chinese. In 1674 he went to Wittenberg, then Leipzig, where he held private lectures on oriental languages.

By circumstance, he came into possession of an Armenian Bible, so that he was able to publish in 1680 the first Armenian print in Germany, prophet Obadiah with observations.

Acoluthus returned in 1683 to Breslau where he entered the practical religious service. In 1689 he became professor of the Hebrew language at the St. Elisabeth school, one year later he became senior at St. Bernhard.

Andreal Acoluthus was the father of Johann Karl Acoluthus von Folgersberg, who was ennobled by Charles VI.

== Publications ==
- De aquis zelotypiae amaris, 1682
- Specimen alcorani quadrilinguis, 1701
