= Battle of Shepeleviche =

1654 battle part of Russo-Polish War

Coordinates: 54°07′47″N 29°33′36″E

- Part of the Russo-Polish War (1654–1667) and Tsar Alexei's campaign of 1654–1655
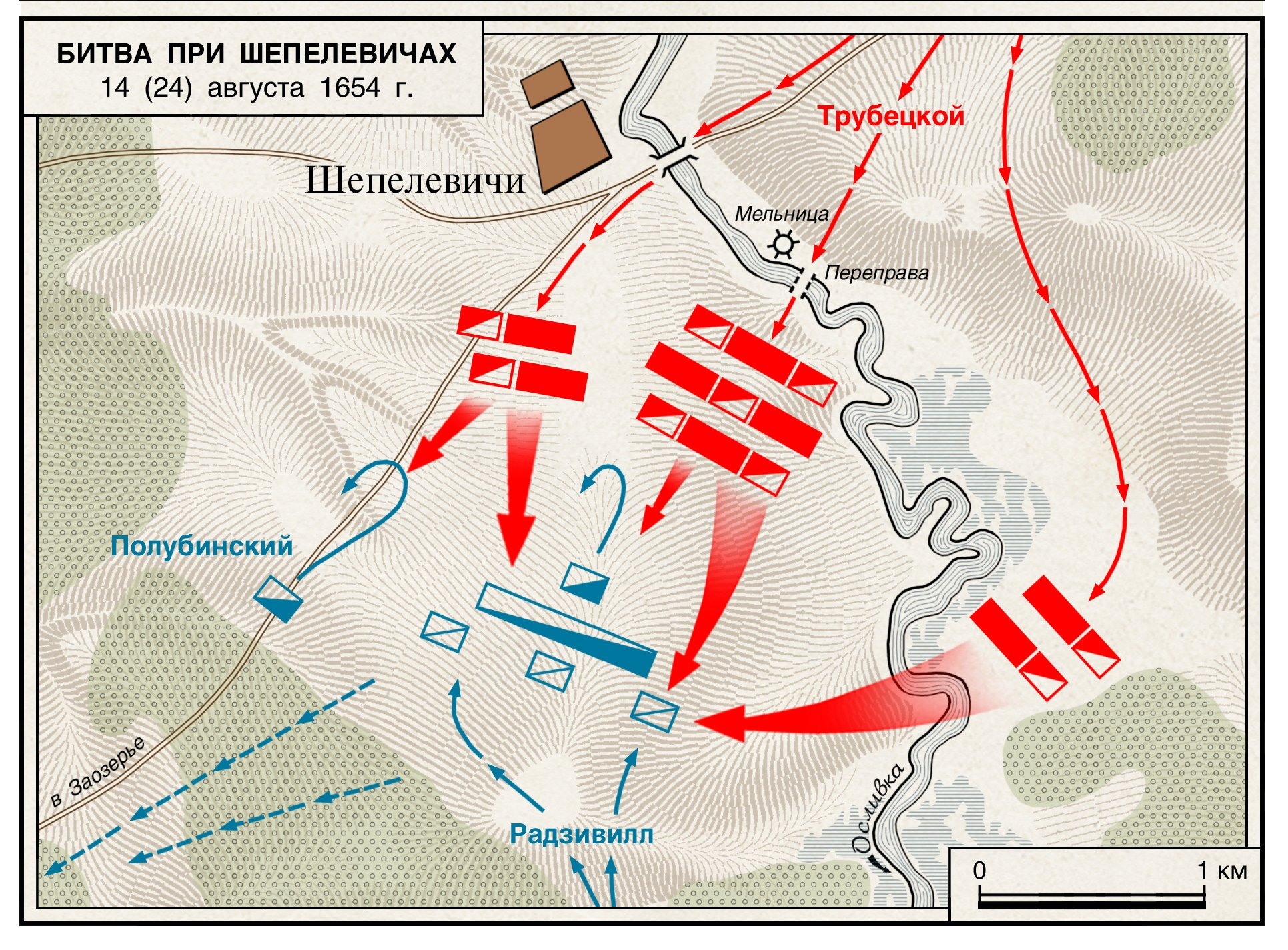
- Map of the attack of the Muscovite cavalry and infantry on the Polish–Lithuanian army
Date	24 August 1654
Location	Shepeleviche, Vitebsk Voivodeship, Grand Duchy of Lithuania, Polish–Lithuanian Commonwealth
Result	Russian victory

Belligerents
Tsardom of Russia	Polish–Lithuanian Commonwealth

Commanders and leaders
Aleksey Trubetskoy	Janusz Radziwiłł (WIA); Wincenty Gosiewski

Strength
15,000	6,000–8,000

Casualties and losses
9 killed 97 wounded	1,000–3,000 killed 230—253 captured

The Battle of Shepeleviche (Szepielewicze) or Battle of Ciecierzyn on 24 August 1654 was one of the first battles of the Russo-Polish War (1654–67). It ended with a Russian victory.

== Battle ==
A small Polish–Lithuanian force of about 5,000 under Great Lithuanian Hetman Janusz Radziwiłł stopped the Russian force under knyaz Yakov Cherkassky at Shklow and camped at Hołowczyn. He learned that a Russian force under knyaz Aleksey Trubetskoy crossed Drut River near Ciecierzyn on 23 August. Radziwiłl was joined by the Field Lithuanian Hetman Wincenty Korwin Gosiewski with 3,000 strong forces, increasing the Polish–Lithuanian army to about 6,000–8,000.

Radziwiłł and Gosiewski then tried to stop a numerically superior Russian force of 15,000 near Shepeleviche (Szepielewicze). Trubetskoy forces also included Cherkassky's. He took positions near Bialynichy (Białynicze). This time the even larger Russian army managed to outflank him, with Russian infantry holding Shepeleviche and cavalry attacking from the rear. Radziwiłł ordered a retreat, on the 24 (or 25) August the retreating Lithuanian army was defeated and its artillery was captured by the Russians.

== Aftermath ==
Radziwiłł with a remainder of his forces retreated to Minsk. His defeat meant that Russians faced no opposition in Lithuania, and they were able to take Polotsk, Vitebsk and Mogilev, advancing to the Berezina River. Russian forces were able to advance and take Smolensk (see Siege of Smolensk (1654)) as well as Orsha which they held till 1661.
