= Bernard Nieuwentyt =

Dutch philosopher, mathematician, physician, and politician

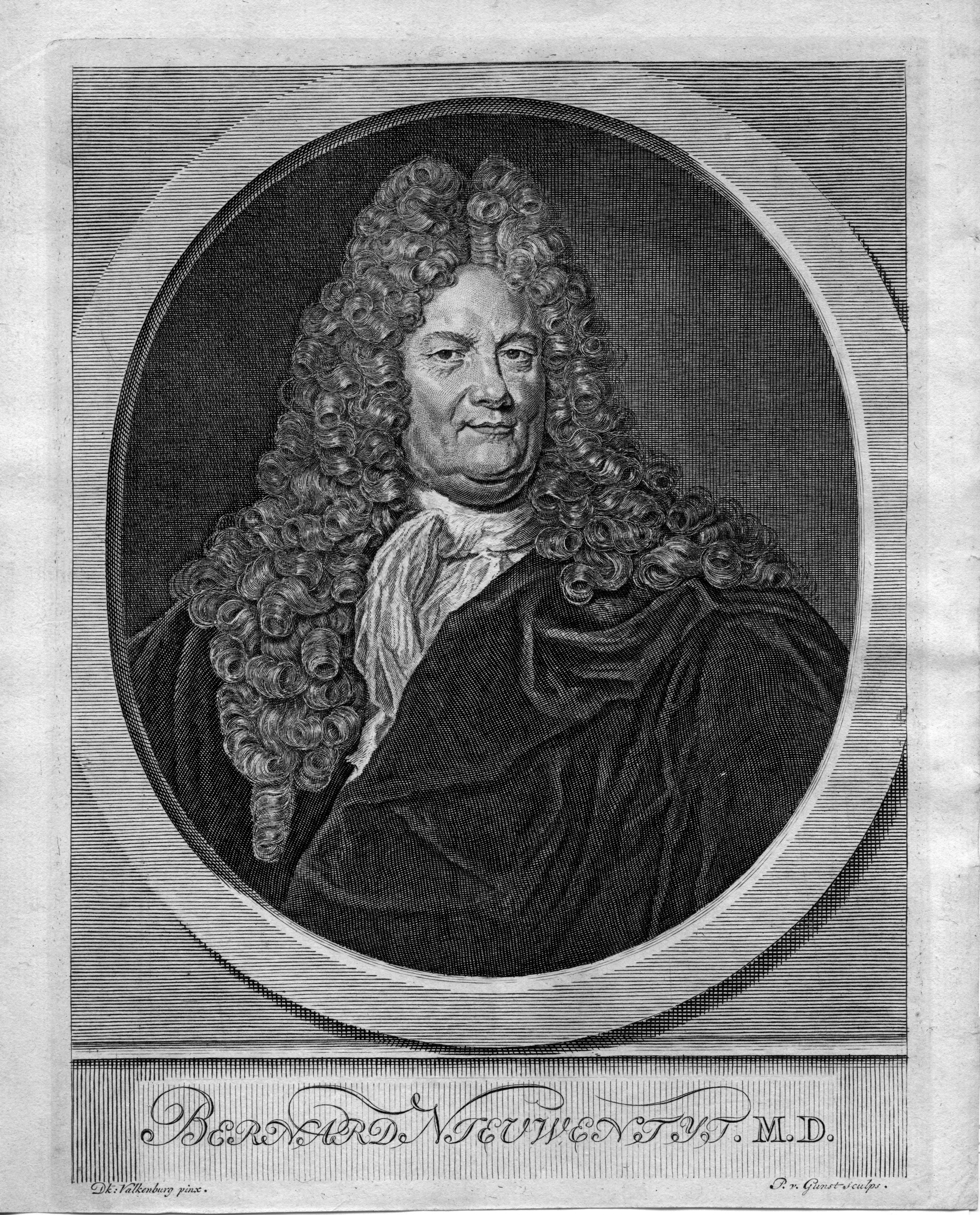
Bernard Nieuwentyt.

Bernard Nieuwentijt, Nieuwentijdt, or Nieuwentyt (10 August 1654, West-Graftdijk, North Holland – 30 May 1718, Purmerend) was a Dutch philosopher, mathematician, physician, magistrate, mayor (of Purmerend), and theologian.

== Career ==
As a philosopher, Nieuwentyt was a follower of Descartes and an opponent of Spinoza. In 1695 he was involved in a controversy over the foundations of infinitesimal calculus with Leibniz. Nieuwentijt advocated 'nilsquare' infinitesimals (which have higher powers of zero), whereas Leibniz was uncertain about explicitly adopting such a rule - they did however come to be used throughout physics from then on.

He wrote several books (in Dutch) including his chief work Het regt gebruik der werelt beschouwingen, ter overtuiginge van ongodisten en ongelovigen [The True Use of Contemplating the World] (1715), which argued for the existence of God and attacked Spinoza. It went through several editions (1715, 1717, 1720, 1725, 1730, 1740) published by Joannes Pauli, and was translated into English as The religious philosopher, or the right use of contemplating the works of the Creator (1718) and into French as De l'existence de Dieu démontrée par les merveilles de la nature, ou traité téléologique dirigé contre la doctrine de Spinoza par un médecin hollandais. Voltaire owned a copy of this book, and it was an influence on William Paley, to the extent that in 1859 Robert Blakey could make "a detailed argument for plagiarism" by Paley. To the English version was added a letter to the translator by John Theophilus Desaguliers. Nieuwentyt's posthumously published Gronden van zekerheid [Fundaments of Certitude, or the Right Method of Mathematicians in the Ideal as well as the Real] (1720) argued Spinoza's 'geometrical method' was not the proper 'experimental method' of science. The work also contains a critique of the ontological argument similar to a later critique by Kant.

== Works ==
- Het regt gebruik der werelt beschouwingen, ter overtuiginge van ongodisten en ongelovigen, Amsterdam, 1715
- The Religious Philosopher, 1718
- Gronden van zekerheid, 1720

== See also ==
- Continuum (theory)
