= Philippe Avril =

- Born: September 16, 1654
- Died: (presumed) 1698 (aged 43–44)
- Occupation: Professor
- Known for: Exploration

Philippe Avril (French pronunciation: [filip avʁil]; 1654 – 1698 (presumed)) was a Jesuit explorer of the Far East. He was born at Angoulême, France on 16 September 1654.

Avril was a professor of philosophy and mathematics at Paris when he was dispatched to the Jesuit missions of China. Following the instructions of Ferdinand Verbiest, another Jesuit, then at Peking, he attempted an overland journey, and traveled for six years through Kurdistan, Armenia, Astrakhan, Persia, and other countries of eastern Asia.

Arriving at Moscow, Avril was refused permission to pass through Tatary, and was sent by the Government to Poland, whence he made his way to Istanbul and from there went back to France. Though exhausted by disease, he set out again on a vessel, which was lost at sea. Avril presumably died in a 1698 shipwreck.

Avril's journal and writings provide a significant amount of useful material for modern historians and demographers.
