= Kruhlaye =

Town in Mogilev Region, Belarus

Kruhlaye: Круглае (Belarusian); Круглое (Russian)
- Town
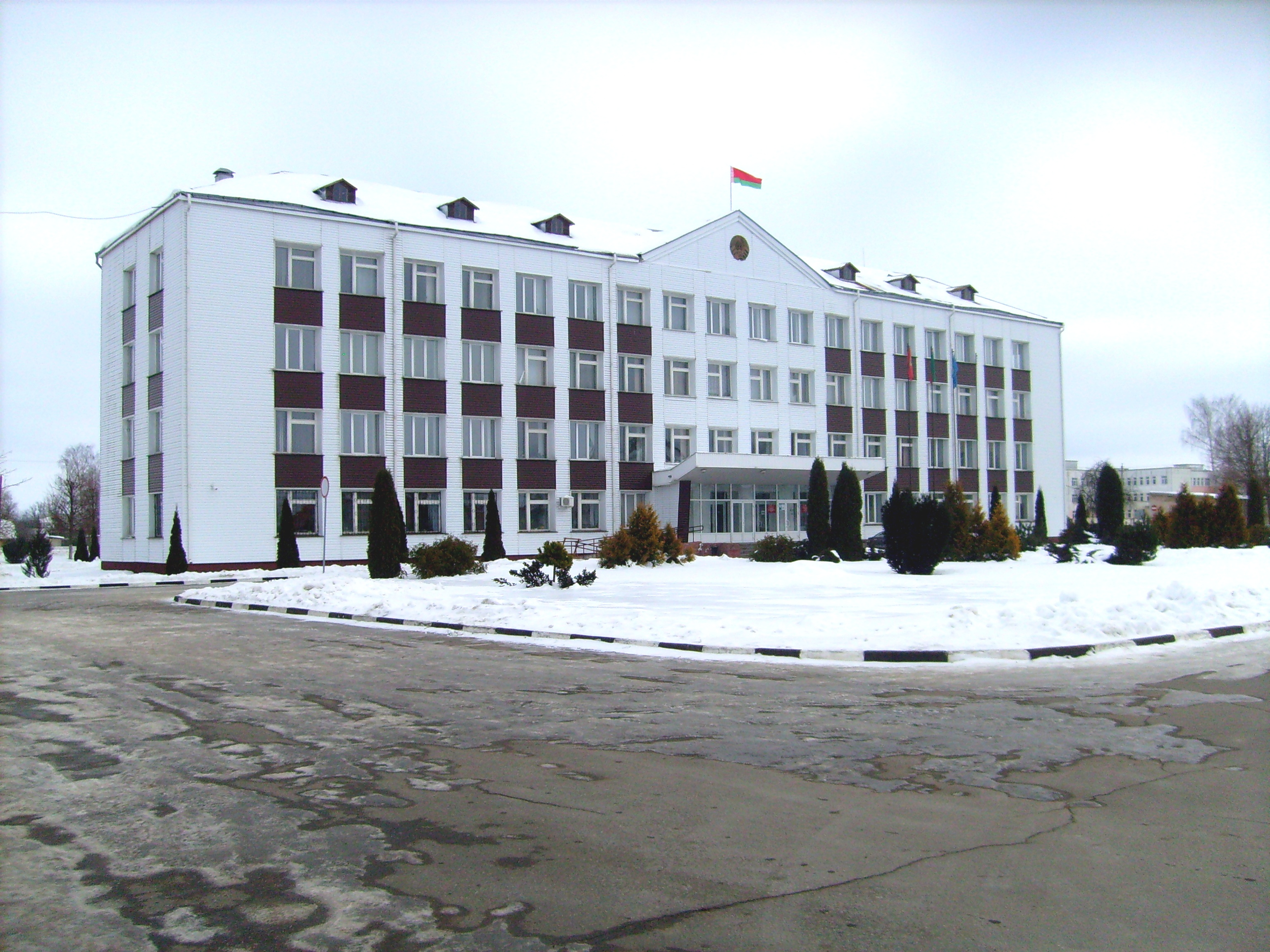

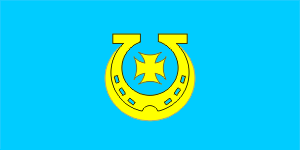
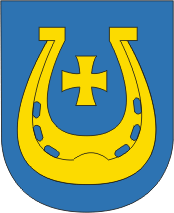
- Flag Coat of arms

- Location within Belarus
- Coordinates: 54°14′52″N 29°47′47″E
- Country: Belarus
- Region: Mogilev Region
- District: Kruhlaye District
- First mentioned: 1524
- Elevation: 166 m (545 ft)

Population (2025)
  - Total: 7,031
- Time zone: UTC+3 (MSK)
- Postal code: 213188
- Area code: +375 2234
- License plate: 6

Kruhlaye or Krugloe (Belarusian: Круглае, romanized: Kruhlaje; Russian: Круглое, romanized: Krugloye) is a town in Mogilev Region, Belarus. It serves as the administrative center of Kruhlaye District. In 2020, its population was 7,600. As of 2025, it has a population of 7,031.

== History ==
The map Magni Dvcatvs Litvaniae in svos Palatinatvs et Districtvs Divisvs (Palatinates of Grand Duchy of Lithuania and its Division of Districts) by Jan Nieprzecki from 1749 shows it as Kruhla.
