= Solar eclipse of August 12, 1654 =

Total eclipse

- Total eclipse
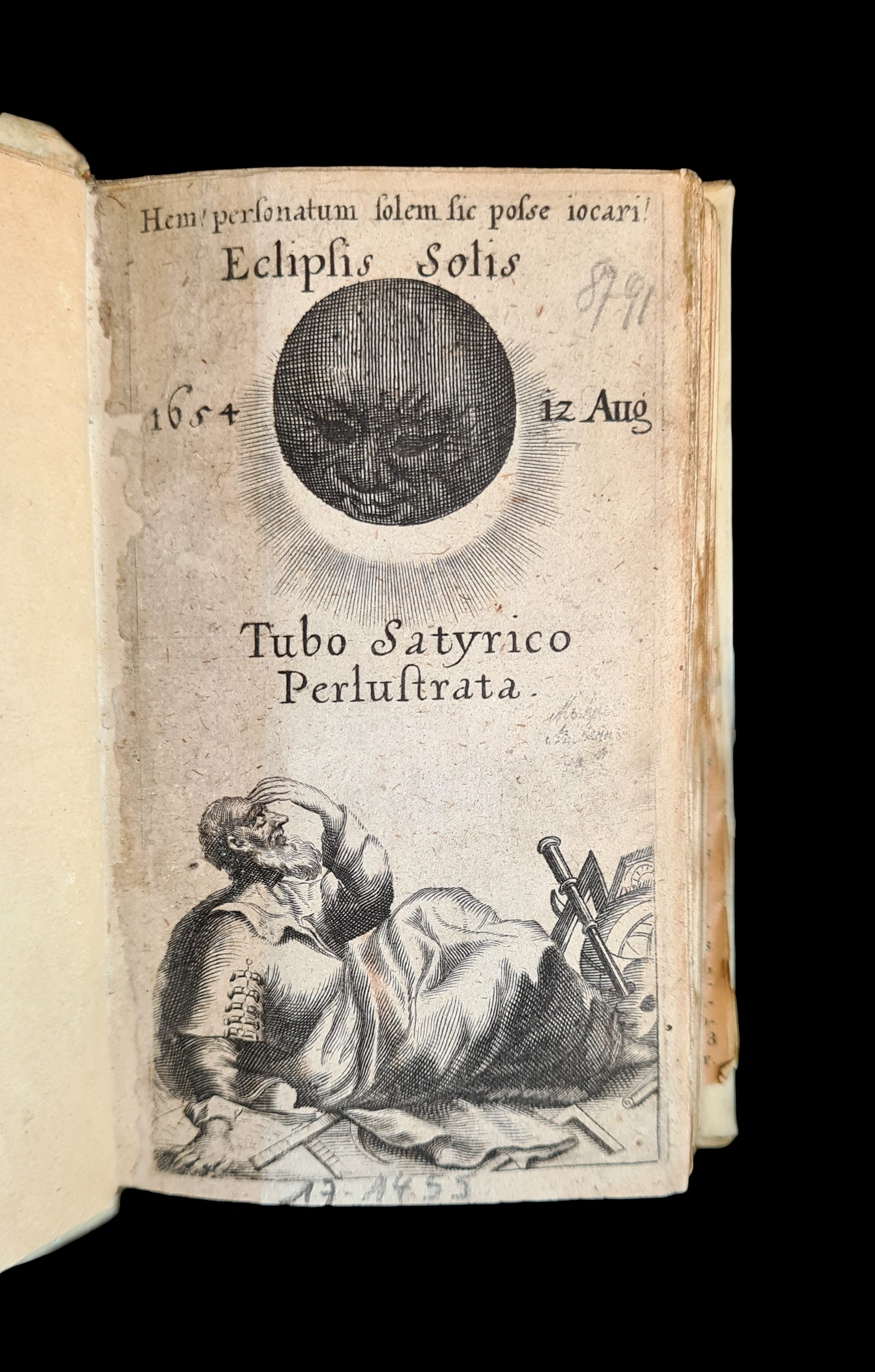

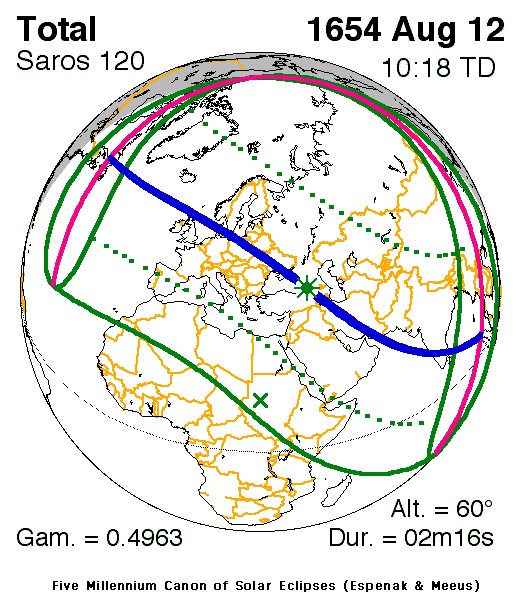
- Map
- Gamma: 0.4962
- Magnitude: 1.0285

Maximum eclipse
- Duration: 136 s (2 min 16 s)
- Coordinates: 41.7°N 42.5°E
- Max. width of band: 110 km (68 mi)

Times (UTC)
- Greatest eclipse: 10:17:43

References
- Saros: 120 (41 of 71)
- Catalog # (SE5000): 8673

A total solar eclipse occurred on August 12, 1654. A solar eclipse occurs when the Moon passes between Earth and the Sun, thereby totally or partly obscuring the image of the Sun for a viewer on Earth. A total solar eclipse occurs when the Moon's apparent diameter is larger than the Sun's, blocking all direct sunlight, turning day into darkness. Totality occurs in a narrow path across Earth's surface, with the partial solar eclipse visible over a surrounding region thousands of kilometres wide.

== Observations and history ==
The eclipse occurred during the Battle of Shklow (1654).

== Related eclipses ==
It is a part of solar Saros 120.

== Eclipse in art ==
- De Eclipsi solari anno M. DC. LIV., die XII. augusti, in Europa a pluribus spectata tubo optico, satirical writing by Jakob Balde (1662).
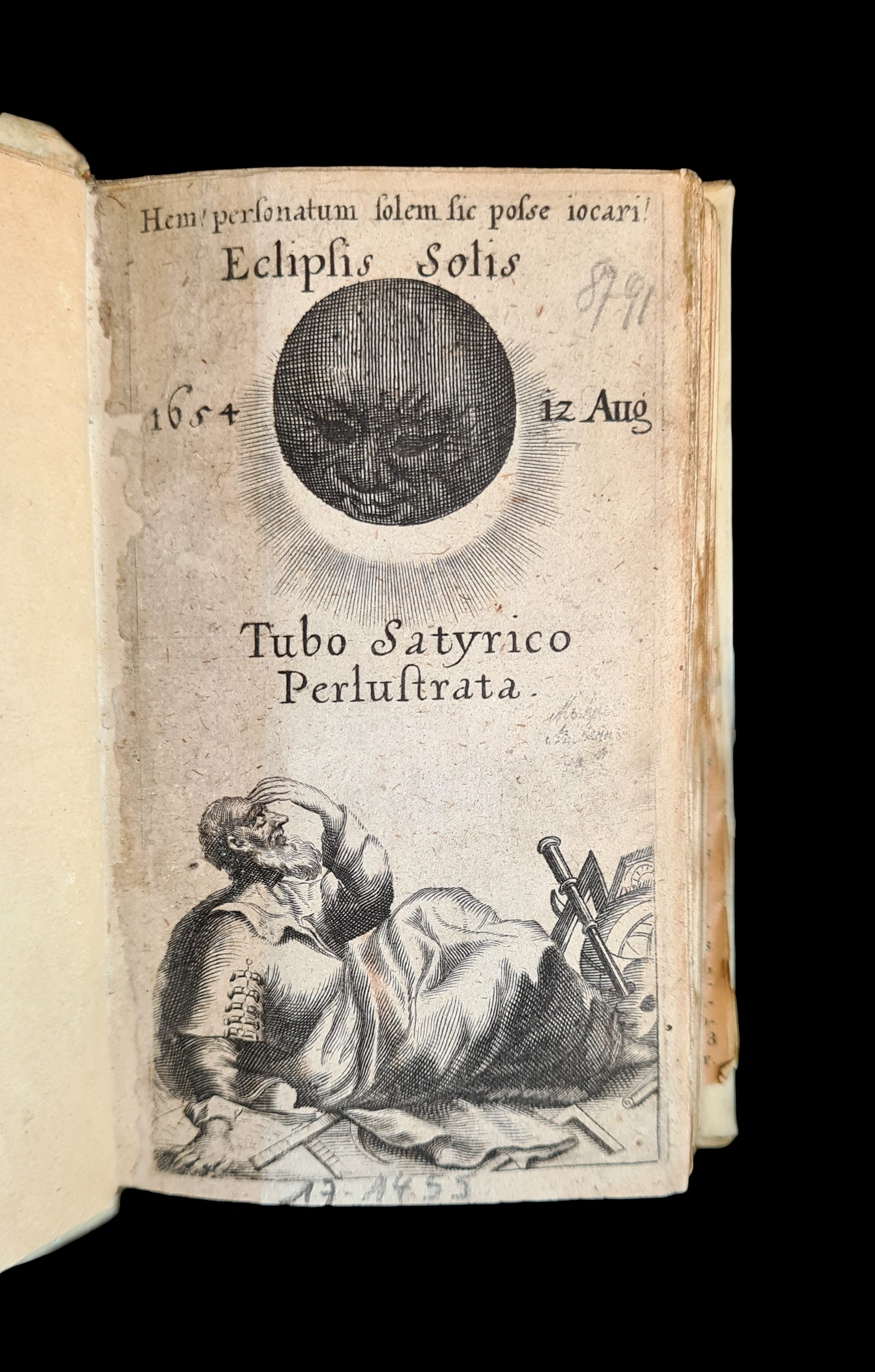

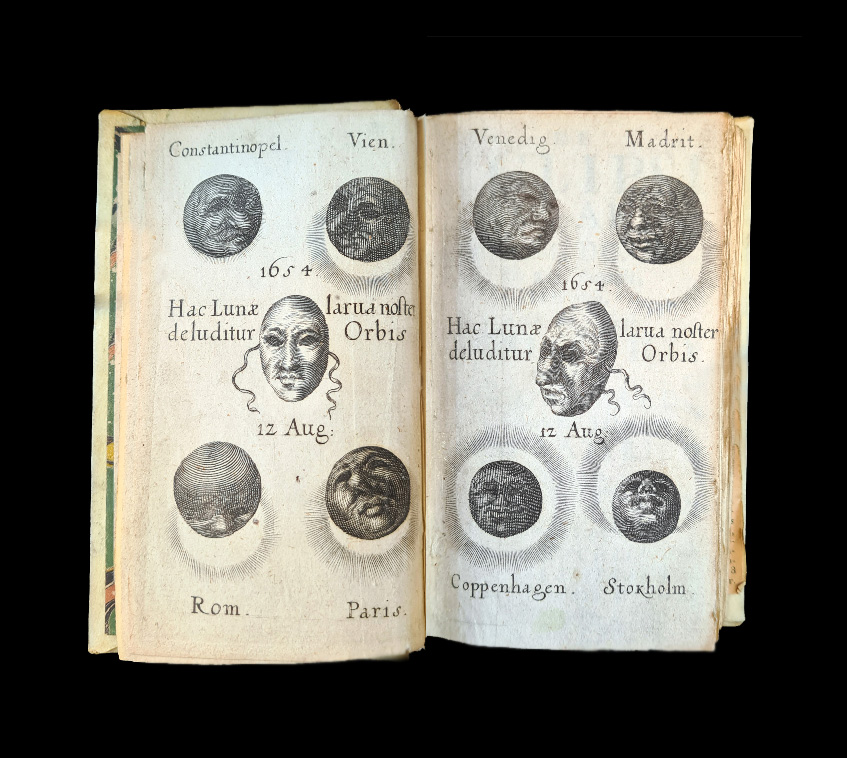

== See also ==
- List of solar eclipses visible from the United Kingdom 1000–2090 AD
