= Kruhlaye district =

District of Mogilev region, Belarus

Coordinates: 54°14′53″N 29°47′48″E

Kruhlaye district Круглянскі раён (Belarusian) Круглянский район (Russian)
- District
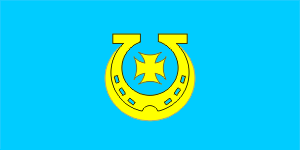
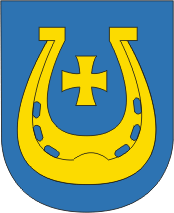
- Flag Coat of arms

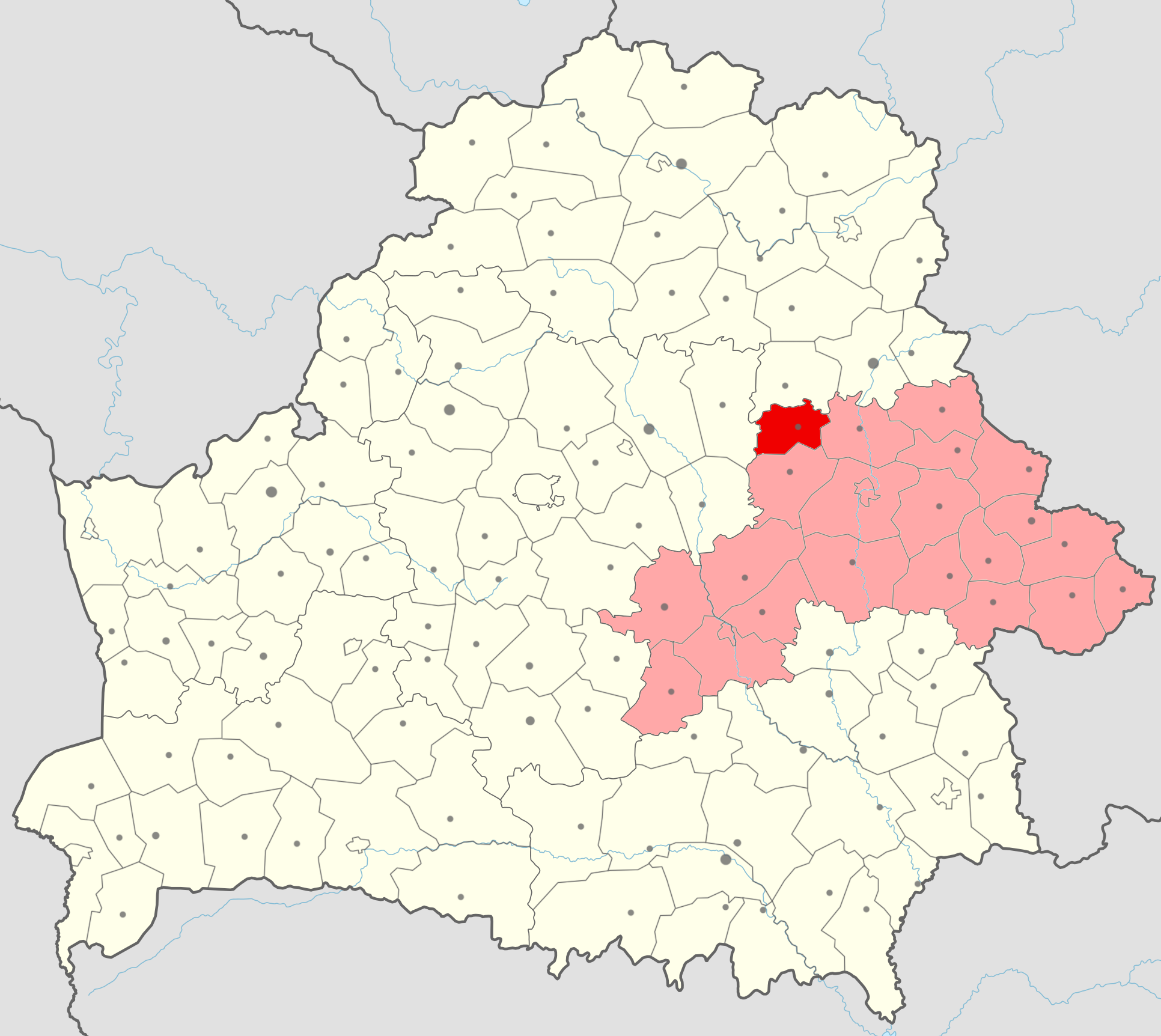
- Country: Belarus
- Region: Mogilev region
- Administrative center: Kruhlaye

Area
  - Total: 881.81 km^{2} (340.47 sq mi)

Population (2023)
  - Total: 12,848
  - Density: 14.570/km^{2} (37.736/sq mi)
- Time zone: UTC+3 (MSK)

Kruhlaye district or Kruhlaje district (Belarusian: Круглянскі раён; Russian: Круглянский район, romanized: Kruglyansky rayon) is a district (raion) of Mogilev region in Belarus. The administrative center is the urban-type settlement of Kruhlaye. As of 2009, its population was 15,761. The population of Kruhlaye accounts for 47.8% of the district's population.
