= John Joseph of the Cross =

Italian Catholic saint

Saint John Joseph of the Cross O.F.M.
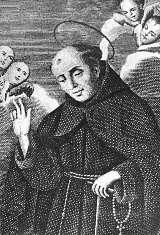
- Picture.

Priest
- Born: Ischia, Kingdom of Naples
- Died: Ischia, Kingdom of Naples
- Venerated in: Catholic Church
- Beatified: 24 May 1789, Saint Peter's Basilica, Papal States by Pope Pius VI
- Canonized: 26 May 1839, Saint Peter's Basilica, Papal States by Pope Gregory XVI
- Feast: 5 March
- Attributes: Franciscan habit
- Patronage: Ischia

John Joseph of the Cross, OFM (born Carlo Gaetano Calosinto; 15 August 1654 – 5 March 1739) was an Italian Catholic priest and professed member of the Order of Friars Minor who hailed from the island of Ischia. He had a reputation for austerity and for the gift of miracles and served as a novice master.

He was beatified in 1789 and later canonized in 1839.

== Life ==
Carlo Gaetano Calosirto was born on 15 August 1654 on the island of Ischia off the coast of Naples.

He entered the Order of Friars Minor in Naples before he turned sixteen and assumed the religious name of "John Joseph of the Cross". He was the first Italian to follow the reform movement of Peter of Alcantara. In 1674 he was sent to found a convent for the order at Afila in Piedmont and assisted in the actual construction itself. He was ordained to the priesthood – much against his will – and as the superior performed the lowliest tasks.

In 1702 the Italian convents were no longer dependent on the Spanish houses but were formed into a separate province. He was appointed as the Vicar Provincial of the Alcantarine Reform in the Italian peninsula as a result of this. As the superior he ordered that no beggar should be dismissed from the convent gate without some form of relief: in times of need he devoted to their necessities his own portions and even that of the convent he lived at. When he trekked across the mainland as the provincial he would not make himself known at the inns where he lodged because he disliked distinction and did not believe such should be paid to him.

He desired those whom he restored to health to take some certain medicine that the cure might be attributed to a mere natural source and with regard to his own prophecies - which were numerous - he affected to judge from analogies and experiences.

== Sainthood ==
He was beatified under Pope Pius VI on 24 May 1789 and was later canonized as a saint of the Catholic Church on 26 May 1839 under Pope Gregory XVI. At the Aragonese Castle (Il Castello Aragonese) on Ischia there is a small chapel consecrated to the late friar.
