= The Rehearsal (play) =

17th-century play by George Villiers, 2nd Duke of Buckingham

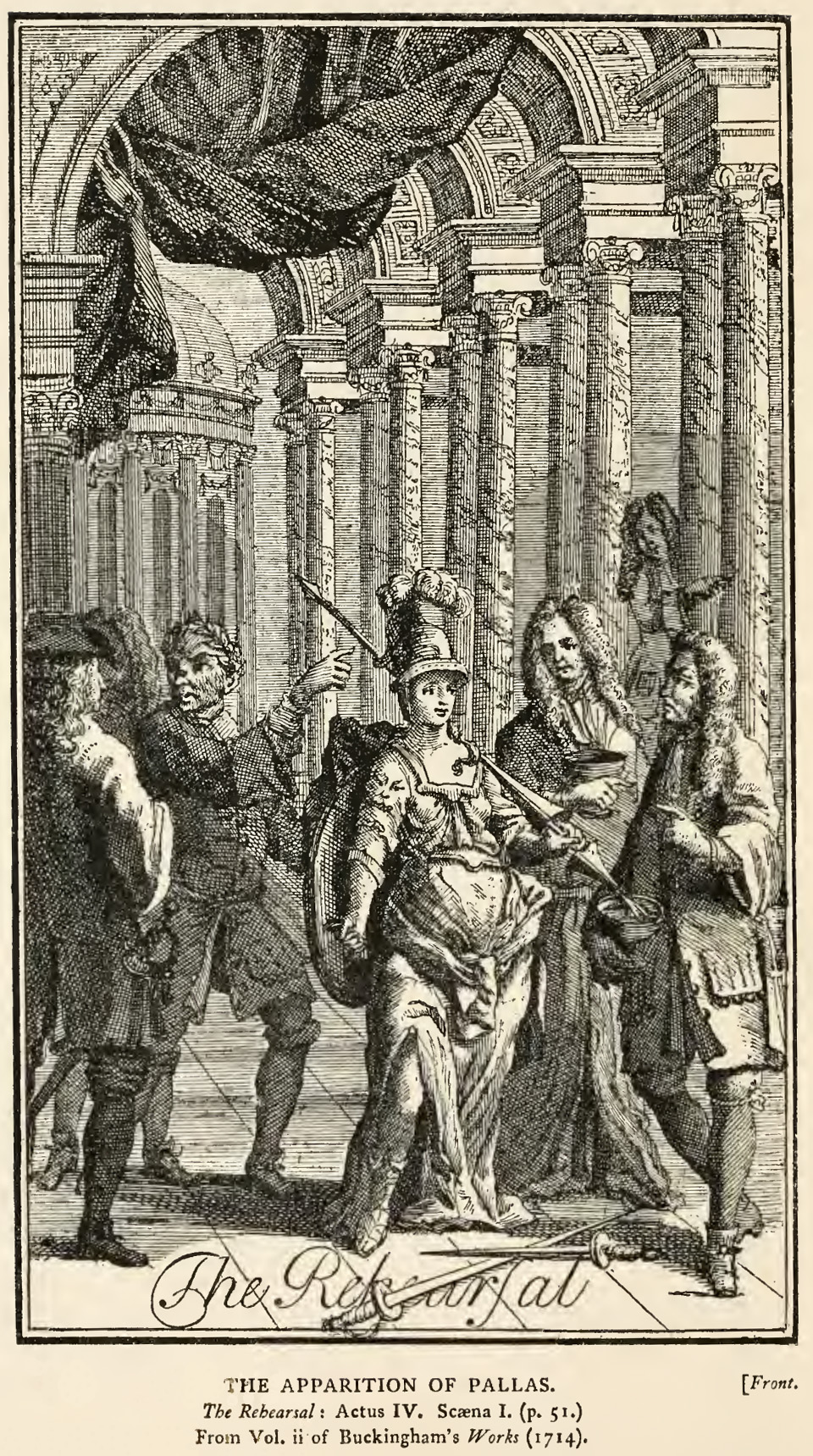
Frontispiece of The Rehearsal by Buckingham (1714 edition of Buckingham's Works, vol 2), showing the apparition of Pallas (Acte IV scene 1).

The Rehearsal was a satirical play aimed specifically at John Dryden and generally at the sententious and overly ambitious theatre of the Restoration tragedy. The play was first staged on 7 December 1671 at the Theatre Royal, and published anonymously in 1672, but it is certainly by George Villiers, 2nd Duke of Buckingham and others. Several people have been suggested as collaborators, including Samuel Butler of Hudibras fame, Martin Clifford, and Thomas Sprat, a Royal Society founder and later Bishop of Rochester.

The play concerns a playwright named Bayes attempting to stage a play. The play he is going to put on is made up almost entirely of excerpts of existing heroic dramas. The name "Bayes" indicates the poet laureate. The previous poet laureate had been William Davenant, and Davenant did stage spectacles and plays with exceptionally bombastic speeches from the heroes (e.g. The Siege of Rhodes). However, the poet laureate at the time of the play was Dryden, and most of the excerpts in the play-within-a-play are liftings from Dryden. In particular, Dryden's The Conquest of Granada, which had been his most popular play (and the one whose preface had defined "heroic drama"), is the play Buckingham parodies. Dryden had written other heroic drama aside from The Conquest of Granada. In fact, he had been so prolific in that vein that Martin Clifford accused him of "stealing from himself." The reason that The Conquest of Granada was such a target, however, is the Preface to the printed version of The Conquest of Granada. There, Dryden scolds his fellow dramatists for having immoral heroes and low sentiments, and he proposes a new type of theatre, the heroic drama. Buckingham's play is, in a sense, the old theatre biting him back. In The Rehearsal, a director/author attempts to put on a new play, and he lectures his actors and critics with impossible and absurd instructions on the importance of what they are doing.

The Rehearsal infuriated Dryden, and it is not possible to see the satire without some political cause or effect. (Dryden would not forget the satire, and he made Buckingham into the figure of Zimri in his Absalom and Achitophel.) However, for readers and viewers what was most delightful was the way that Buckingham effectively punctures the puffed up bombast of Dryden's plays. By taking Dryden's own words out of context and pasting them together, Buckingham disrupts whatever emotions that might have gone with them originally and exposes their inherent absurdity.

The play is credited with putting an end to heroic drama, but, in the long run, it did not. If "heroic drama" is understood only as the writings of Dryden in an heroic vein, then perhaps The Rehearsal was a success. Dryden was unable or unwilling to pursue heroic drama for long after The Rehearsal came out. Whether The Rehearsal or the she-tragedy made popular by the acting of Elizabeth Barry did it, there was a turn away from the Classical heroes of Dryden's heroic drama. However, new plays with exaggerated heroes who mouth impossibly high-sounding moral sentiments and accomplish impossibly extravagant actions continued to be written through to the 1740s (see, for example, Henry Carey's Chrononhotonthologos). In fact, the trend toward absurdly lofty bombast and sentiment was so strong that Richard Brinsley Sheridan reworked The Rehearsal for his play, The Critic (1779), where the target was the inflated importance and prose of theatre criticism. To some degree, the parodic form of a play-within-a-play goes back to Shakespeare's satire of pantomime plays in A Midsummer Night's Dream and forward to the contemporary Mel Brooks film (and later stage musical) The Producers.

Eighteenth-century editions of The Rehearsal contained a Key that identified the Restoration plays to which Buckingham and his collaborators allude in their work. The Key was originally attributed to Buckingham himself, but is actually the work of Morphew Briscoe. Briscoe's Key contains some accurate information, but also has deficiencies. Later commentators have worked to improve upon it.

== Character list ==
Reproduced from the first edition, but adjusted to modern spelling.

=== Men ===
- Bayes
- Johnson
- Smith
- Two Kings of Brentford
- Prince Pretty-man
- Prince Volscius
- Gentleman Usher
- Physician
- Drawcansir
- General
- Lieutenant General
- Cordelio
- Tom Thimble
- Fisherman
- Sun
- Thunder
- Players
- Soldiers
- Two Heralds
- Four Cardinals
- Mayor
- Judges
- Sergeants at Arms

=== Women ===
- Amaryllis
- Cloris
- Parthenope
- Pallas
- Lightning
- Moon
- Earth
- Attendants of Men and Women

== Plot synopsis ==
=== Act I, Scene I ===
Johnson and Smith, who has just come to the city from the country, meet by chance and begin talking about the new plays that are currently being shown. The author and director of a new play, Bayes, appears and introduces his production to the two men, boasting about the greatness of his work. Lacking inspiration for original material, Bayes steals all of his ideas from different epics and plays of the time, as well as classical authors such as Seneca and Pliny. Wanting to show off his play, he offers to bring Johnson and Smith to a rehearsal.

When the three men arrive at the rehearsal stage, the actors are seen struggling to understand how they should portray their roles. Bayes continually intervenes to explain what's going on in the play to Smith and Johnson and also to direct the players.

Because it lacks logic or continuity, Smith constantly asks Bayes about the plot of the play. However, Bayes asserts that Smith doesn't understand because he's been in the country for too long. Johnson spurs Bayes on, because he wants to see the foolishness of the play and to irritate his close friend Smith.

One proposed prologue or perhaps epilogue of Bayes’ play features the characters Thunder and Lightning, who threaten the audience. The prologue is ludicrous and Smith once again questions Bayes about what's happening. Bayes defends himself and the play by stating that it is a "new way of writing." Because at first he doesn't understand that Smith is criticising, Bayes just answers all the questions as if they were purely academic queries and not patronising questions.

=== Act II, Scene I ===
Bayes introduces his play, and claims that it will begin with two men whispering to one another. The egotistical playwright justifies the whispering on the grounds that they're politicians and not supposed to talk about matters of state. We later discover the two men are plotting against the two kings of Brentford, and Bayes wants to foreshadow the future overthrowing of the kings.

=== Act II, Scene II ===
Two kings enter the stage, hand in hand. They begin speaking of the whispering between the usher and the physician which Smith once again questions, as the kings were not present in the previous scene. Bayes faults the actors by saying they should have entered earlier.

=== Act II, Scene III ===
Yet another new actor comes out as Prince Pretty-man and immediately falls asleep, allegedly as a symptom of his love for Cloris. A woman actress enters, supposedly Prince Pretty-man's love interest, whom he describes as "a blazing comet." Prince Pretty-man falls asleep again, then suddenly awakes, declaring "it" is resolved. No one is sure, other than Bayes, what "it" is. When questioned, Bayes declares that this is the new style of writing, where one doesn't need to explain oneself.

=== Act II, Scene IV ===
The whispering conspirators return, apprehensive that their whispers from the opening scene were overheard. This scene, according to Bayes, is meant to show the audience how businessmen ought to discuss business. In light of their predicament, the two actors pull out their swords and claim the two thrones; somehow this indicates that these two men have overthrown the kings and are now the new kings. They exit triumphantly.

=== Act II, Scene V ===
Four actor-soldiers enter and kill one another. Despite their deaths, they are expected to stand up and perform a difficult dance. Bayes offers abusive criticism on their dancing. The actors complain that they are unable to dance to this music, since it begins fast and ends slow. Bayes attempts to show them how it's done, but falls on his face, breaking his nose.

=== Act III, Scene I ===
Act III begins after Bayes's injury from his previous fall, whereupon he tells Johnson and Smith he plans to end every act with a dance. Bayes then continues to describe his style of writing, adding that some scenes of his play might be entirely unnecessary to the plot, but are full of "Wit" and are very popular in the "new style" of writing. In fact, the further the play continues, the less sense it makes, and the more Bayes defends it. Discussion continues to include Bayes' approval of such devices as "songs, ghosts, and dances," as a way of filling the theatre seats. Finally, Bayes calls his play a "Touch-stone," and says he will be able to judge the character of any man by observing his reaction to the play.

=== Act III, Scene II ===
Scene 2 of the play includes 3 major plot developments: the mysterious death, the fisherman/prince conundrum, and the boots/love affair.

The scene begins with the revelation that someone has died; however, exactly who has died is a rather obscure matter. Cordelio enters with a message that is difficult to grasp because all the audience can understand is that someone has died based on one person's words from one kingdom through another's words, incomprehensible. Smith questions Bayes on the identity of who has died, and Bayes still refuses to reveal the character, even suggesting that "she" may still not be dead.

The supposed killer is a fisherman, whom Prince Pretty-Man had believed was his father. Bayes expects his audience to already know that the Prince was a foundling raised as a son by the fisherman, information that was not given during the earlier scenes of the play. The prince then finds out that he is not actually the fisherman's son. He is disturbed by this because he would rather be the son of a fisherman than a bastard.

Prince Volscius falls in love with a barmaid's daughter, who ignores his advances. He is putting on his boots while talking about his love and how he feels love sick. He is giving the boot-putting-on process a second meaning. Boot-putting-on process = indecision. Bayes, Johnson, and Smith talk about this dilemma as if it were a real struggle. The scene concludes with a dance to top off the act – Bayes's signature.

=== Act IV, Scene I ===
This scene is centred around a funeral. The funeral is for a new made-up character, Lardella, who drowned at sea. Bayes has created her brother as well, Drawcansir, a fierce warrior-hero in the play who "frights his mistress, snubs up kings, baffles Armies, and does what he will, without regard to good manners, justice or numbers." (4.1)

Act IV Scene I begins with Bayes’ reading of a letter that he wrote from Lardella as her final words, to be written to her cousin, the King. This final note is a ridiculous metaphor comparing herself to a "humble bee" forever to buzz around in the after-life, essentially haunting the king for the rest of his life. The two usurpers both loved Lardella, and are determined to stab themselves rather than live without her. However, Pallas intervenes and informs them that Lardella is actually alive and they should have a banquet in place of the funeral. To add to the ridiculous scene, Pallas presents a lance full of wine, a pie in her helmet, and a buckler made of cheese. This "nuptial banquet" is then interrupted by Drawcansir's arrival. He snatches the usurper's bowls of wine, threatening anyone who would try to prevent him: "Who e'er to gulp one drop of this dares think I'l stare away his very pow'r to drink. I drink, I huff, I strut, look big and stare, And all this I can do, because I dare."

=== Act IV Scene II ===
Bayes introduces the next scene in which Prince Pretty-Man and Prince Volscius argue because they love two different women. They are arguing over whose woman is better. Bayes keeps interjecting comments about how excellent the lines are. Pretty-Man starts out saying how he wants to talk to Volscius about something. Volscius response that he will listen but there is no way that Pretty-Man's love is greater than his. Pretty-Man and Volscius begin to go back and forth arguing about how great their loves are. They declare their loves are so divine that even gods cannot compare. Their comparisons are very extreme and outlandish. Parthenope is the woman that Prince Volscius loves and Cloris is she whom Prince Pretty-Man loves. At the end of the scene the argument is not actually resolved, because Bayes drops his wig. Johnson wonders why the scene is suddenly all in verse in comparison to the rest of the play and Bayes's responds that the subject is too lofty for prose. Bayes continues to congratulate himself on the magnificence of his writing.

=== Act V ===
At the very beginning of Act V Bayes introduces a scene with many characters including the two usurper kings, four cardinals, and two princes, as well as many of the lovers and the two usurper kings. Two cardinals are dressed differently from the others but Bayes won't tell them why this is important. Then the scene changes with Bayes bragging about Amaryllis speaking very well about the situation. Amaryllis speaks two words and is then cut off by music. The usurpers that are on the thrones perceive that the real kings are coming, and decide to leave. Then the rightful kings descend on clouds singing, symbolising their divine right to rule. Bayes tries to emphasise the kings’ importance by having them speak in rhyme. However the kings’ speech is garbled nonsense. At the end of the speech, fiddlers come out and the kings say they are going to play a coranto. Meanwhile, the fiddlers play a totally irrelevant song. Smith points out that the way the kings are speaking is just confusing. Bayes defends himself by explaining they need to speak in rhyme because they came down from the clouds. The kings call for a dance before they discuss "serious counsel." The kings’ army then arrives to warn thekings that war approaches. The kings pay them, and while Amaryllis is trying to speak again a fight breaks out over the money sent to the army. The kings flee.

At this point Bayes is trying to defend his play from Johnson and Smith. This happens in an interim in acts between the play. They talk about having a fight scene, and Bayes says that there is one coming up. The fight scene is a mockery of fighting because the two actors meant to fight the war each have a lute in one hand and a sword in the other. They carry out their battle in the form of a recitative, each singing of the battle to be fought by huge armies. Bayes says the battle is interrupted by a double eclipse in the form of a dance. Luna is concealed by her veil, like an eclipse, and calls for earth to appear. The sun soon joins them. They dance. Bayes calls an end to the eclipse and another battle ensues. Bayes calls out commands for the battle. The soldiers, some on hobby horses, fight, and one man, Drawcansir, comes in and kills everyone on both sides. Drawcansir then has a brief monologue about how good a fighter he is. He has apparently killed thousands of people and he thinks he stronger than other heroes of literature. He exits.

Johnson and Smith suggest that the dead characters cannot be carried offstage, since there is no one to carry them. Bayes finds this ridiculous because they are not actually dead, so he commands the soldiers to just walk off stage because the audiences knows that they are not actually dead, then he steps out to speak to "Mr. Ivory." Johnson and Smith leave before he returns. Bayes and the players return and Bayes wonders where the men went and goes to find them. One of the actors reads a paper that Bayes left behind that is another bit of "plot." These actors leave for dinner. Bayes enters again; he couldn't find the gentlemen. He then ridicules them for leaving his play early. The stage manager enters, and says that all of the other players have left. Bayes is insulted and starts ranting about how horrible the players are. He says he wants to sell the play to another theatre. He leaves, resolving to take his play with him. Then the remaining players all go to dinner after a short dance.

The epilogue says that there has been no plot to this play. There is also no wit. The remainder is to deplore that plays in that time are ridiculous and nonsensical. The epilogue hopes no more such plays will be written.

== See also ==
- Drawcansir
