= Rigdum Funnidos =

Rigdum Funnidos is a character in Henry Carey's Chrononhotonthologos (1734). Rigdum Funnidos is the comically plain-spoken contrast to the bombastic Aldiborontiphoscophornio. Both are courtiers, but whereas Aldiborontiphoscophornio might explain, when asked who Somnus is,

"The Son of Chaos and of Erebus,
Incestuous Pair! Brother of Mors relentless,
Whose speckled Robe and Wings of blackest Hue,
Astonish all Mankind with hedeous Glare;
Himself with sable Plumes to Men benevolent
Brings downy Slumbers and refreshing Sleep,"

Rigdum Funnidos responds,

"This Gentleman may come of a very good Family, for aught I know; but I would not be in his Place for all the World." (I i, 47-54).

Rigdum is both a Sancho Panza to the absurd Aldiborontiphoscophornio and a figure of the "Plain Dealer" (see The Plain Dealer by William Wycherly).

It is also Sir Walter Scott's nickname for John Ballantyne. Scott's epithet was a compliment. Conversely Aldiborontiphoscophornio was Scott's name for James Ballantyne in allusion to his pompous manner.
