= 1725 in poetry =

Nationality words link to articles with information on the nation's poetry or literature (for instance, Irish or France).

== Events ==
- Scottish poet James Thomson moves to London, where he continues writing verse and becomes a playwright, living first in East Barnet and later Richmond in 1736.
- Edward Taylor, a puritan minister in Westfield, a small settlement in Western Massachusetts, concludes his private spiritual verse diary, begun in 1682. He forbids his family from publishing the work after his death, and none of it sees publication for two centuries. When it is finally published, according to Robert Hass, many are surprised by its quality, although "the assessments of how good he was were quite mixed".

== Works published ==
=== United Kingdom ===
- Joseph Addison, Miscellanies, in Verse and Prose, posthumously published
- Henry Baker, Original Poems; Serious and Humorous (see also, The Second Part of Original Poems 1726)
- Henry Carey, Namby Pamby: or, a panegyrick on the new versification address'd to A[mbrose] P[hilips]
- Thomas Cooke, The Battle of the Poets, published anonymously
- George Bubb Dodington, An Epistle to Sir Robert Walpole, published anonymously this year, although the book states "1726"
- John Dyer and others, A New Miscellany, including the first version of Dyer's Grongar Hill, which appears in a second version in Richard Savage's Miscellaneous Poems and Translations 1726, and in a final version that year in Miscellaneous Poems by Several Hands)
- Peter Folger (also spelled "Foulger"), "A Looking-Glass for the Times", a plea for religious freedom written in 1676 in rough ballad stanzas, English Colonial America
- John Glanvill, Poems
- Christopher Pitt, translator, Vida's Art of Poetry, translated from Marco Girolamo Vida
- Alexander Pope's translation of Homer's Odyssey, Volumes I-III (with William Broome and Elijah Fenton), Volumess IV-V to follow in 1726
- James Thomson, first part of The Seasons, poem in blank verse
- Allan Ramsay, The Gentle Shepherd: A Scots pastoral comedy
- Richard Savage, The Authors of the Town, published anonymously
- William Thomson, compiler, Orpheus Caledonius: or a Collection of the Best Scotch Songs
- Roger Wolcott, Poetical Meditations, including "A Brief Account of the Agency of the Honorable John Winthrop", about the efforts of John Winthrop the Younger to get the Connecticut Charter, English Colonial America
- Edward Young, The Universal Passion: Satire, published anonymously, Parts 1, 2 (April), 3 (To Mr. Dodington, April), 4 (To Sir Spencer Compton, June) each published this year (Part 5, On Women, February 1727; Part 6, On Women, February 1728; Satire the Last. To Sir Robert Walpole, 1726; published together as Love of Fame: The Universal Passion, in Seven Characteristical Satires. The second edition 1728)

== Births ==
Death years link to the corresponding "[year] in poetry" article:

- February 12 – William Mason (died 1797), English poet and gardener
- February 25 – Karl Wilhelm Ramler (died 1798), German
- July 24 – John Newton (died 1807), English clergyman, former slave-ship captain and author of many hymns, including Amazing Grace
- October – Giulio Variboba (died 1788), Arbëresh
- November 27 – Johanna Charlotte Unzer (died 1782), German
- December 5 – Susanna Duncombe (died 1812), English poet and artist
- Also – Gottfried Kleiner (died 1767), German

== Deaths ==
Birth years link to the corresponding "[year] in poetry" article:

- June 29 – Arai Hakuseki (born 1657), Japanese poet, writer and politician
- July 19 (bur.) – Alicia D'Anvers (born 1668), English
- Also – Thomas Walker (born 1696), English Colonial American clergyman and poet

== See also ==
- Poetry
- List of years in poetry
- List of years in literature
- 18th century in poetry
- 18th century in literature
- Augustan poetry
- Scriblerus Club

== Notes ==
- "A Timeline of English Poetry" Web page of the Representative Poetry Online Web site, University of Toronto
