= 1726 in poetry =

This article covers 1726 in poetry. Nationality words link to articles with information on the nation's poetry or literature (for instance, Irish or France).

== Works published ==
=== United Kingdom ===
- Henry Baker, The Second Part of Original Poems: Serious and Humorous (see also Original Poems 1725)
- Ebenezer Cooke (attributed; also spelled "Cook"), "An ELOGY on the Death of Thomas Bordley, Esq.", the first of four elegies attributed to Cooke; English Colonial America
- Henry Carey, Namby Pamby: or, a panegyrick on the new versification address'd to A----- P----, including fragments of many still-popular nursery rhymes, such as "London Bridge is broken down" (see "Namby-pamby" section, below); Dublin
- Alexander Pope, The Odyssey of Homer, Volumes 4 (Books 15–19) and 5 (Books 20–29); (see also Volumes 1–3 1725)
- William Pulteney and Alexander Pope, The Discovery; or, The Squire Turn'd Ferret, published anonymously; satirical ballad on the claim of Mary Toft that she had given birth to rabbits; published this year, although the book states "1727"
- Richard Savage, Miscellaneous Poems and Translations, an anthology including poems by Savage, Aaron Hill, John Dyer ("Grongar Hill", his first poem, written in Pindaric style, rewritten and published separately in 1727) and others, as well as Savage's prose sketch of his early life
- William Somervile, Occasional Poems, Translations, Fables, Tales, &c, published this year, although the book states "1727"
- Joseph Spence - An Essay on Pope's Odyssey, published anonymously; on Alexander Pope's translation of Homer's Odyssey (see above)
- Jonathan Swift, Cadenus and Vanessa, anonymously published; written in 1713 for Esther Vanhomrigh (died 1713), the "Vanessa" of the title (the name was created from the "Van" in her surname and "Esse", the pet form of "Esther")
- James Thomson, Winter, a popular poem first published in April, with five editions by March 1728; in 1730 the poem was expanded to 787 lines (see also Summer 1727, Spring 1728, The Seasons 1730)

==== "Namby–Pamby" first appears ====
Henry Carey's poem, Namby Pamby: or, a panegyrick on the new versification address'd to A----- P----, published this year (some sources give the publication year as 1725), satirizes the poetry of Ambrose Philips, with the name a play on the first three letters of "Ambrose". Carey and others, including John Gay, Alexander Pope and Jonathan Swift, used the term as a disparaging nickname for Philips, but this year Carey was the first to put it into print. Carey's poem, a reaction against the style of Philips' To the Honourable Miss Carteret of 1725, mimicked the cloying, overly sentimental reduplication in some verse Phillips had written for children or as elegies of dead children, such as these opening lines from Miss Charlotte Pulteney, in Her Mother’s Arms:

Timely blossom, infant fair,
Fondling of a happy pair,
Every morn and every night
Their solicitous delight

Compare with Carey's lampoon of this year:

All ye poets of the age,
All ye witlings of the stage ...
Namby-Pamby is your guide,
Albion's joy, Hibernia's pride.
Namby-Pamby, pilly-piss,
Rhimy-pim'd on Missy Miss
Tartaretta Tartaree
From the navel to the knee;
That her father's gracy grace
Might give him a placy place.

In The Dunciad (1733), Pope would also make fun of Philips: "Beneath his reign, shall [...] Namby Pamby be prefer'd for Wit!" Pope despised Philips for both political and professional reasons, in part because Whig critics such as Joseph Addison had compared Philips' rustic verse favorably to that of Pope, a Tory. Within a generation, "Namby Pamby" began to broaden its meaning, so that in William Ayres' Memoirs of the life and writings of Alexander Pope of 1745, Jonathan Swift was said to be referring to the "Namby Pamby Stile" of writing. By 1774, the meaning had broadened further, covering anything ineffectual or weak, so that The Westmoreland Magazine could refer to "A namby-pamby Duke". The hyphenated phrase now covers anything ineffectual or affectedly sentimental.

== Births ==
Death years link to the corresponding "[year] in poetry" article:

- January 28 – Christian Felix Weiße (died 1804), German
- May 1 – Justus Friedrich Wilhelm Zachariae (died 1777), German writer, translator, editor and composer
- August 2 – Lê Quý Đôn (died 1784), Vietnamese philosopher, poet, encyclopedist and government official
- date unknown – Zaharije Orfelin (died 1785), Serb educator, administrator, poet, engraver, lexicographer, herbalist, historian, winemaker, translator, editor, publisher, polemicist and traveler

== Deaths ==
Birth years link to the corresponding "[year] in poetry" article:

- May 20 – Nicholas Brady (born 1659), Anglo-Irish clergyman and poet
- date unknown:
  - Aogán Ó Rathaille (born c. 1670), Irish poet, creator of the Aisling poem
  - Sonome 斯波 園女 (born 1664), Japanese woman poet, friend and noted correspondent of Matsuo Bashō

== See also ==
- Poetry
- List of years in poetry
- List of years in literature
- 18th century in poetry
- 18th century in literature
- Augustan poetry
- Scriblerus Club

== Notes ==
- "A Timeline of English Poetry" Web page of the Representative Poetry Online Web site, University of Toronto
