= James Ballantyne =

British publisher

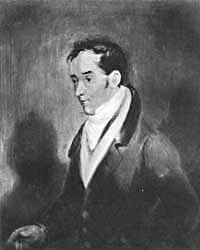
- Born: James Ballantyne; 15 January 1772; Kelso, Scottish Borders
- Died: 26 January 1833 (aged 61); Edinburgh, Scotland
- Occupations: Newspaper editor, book printer and theatre critic
- Years active: 1796–1833
- Relatives: John Ballantyne (brother); George Hogarth (brother-in-law); R. M. Ballantyne (nephew)

James Ballantyne (15 January 1772 – 26 January 1833) was a Scottish solicitor, editor and publisher who worked for his friend Sir Walter Scott. His brother John Ballantyne (1774–1821) was also with the publishing firm, which is noted for the publication of the Novelist's Library (1820), and many works edited or written by Scott.

== Early life ==
James was born in Kelso, Scottish Borders in 1772, the oldest son in a family of successful merchants. He attended Kelso Grammar School where he met Sir Walter Scott for the first time in 1783. Scott lived with his aunt briefly in Kelso when they met. They shared a love of literature. James went on to attend Edinburgh University to study law. He returned to Kelso in 1795 to become a solicitor.

== Publishing ==
Although James was not raised in a printing family, he opened a printing office in 1796. On 13 April 1797, the first edition of the pro-Tory newspaper, The Kelso Mail, was published in which James was also the editor. Due to the newspaper being only weekly, he desired to work with those in the literary field who could use his services on the days he wasn't printing the Mail. In 1799, he begged Scott to write a few paragraphs for the newspaper on legal questions of the day. Scott then persuaded James to publish books as well as newspapers. That same year, James secretly printed An Apology for Tales of Terror and The Eve of St John, which gave a start to Scott's writing career. This was the beginning of a partnership that would continue until Scott's death in 1832. Impressed with the typographical excellence of the first two published pamphlets, Scott offered James the rights to publish a collection of Border ballads that he had begun collecting. This collection was printed in 1802 as Minstrelsy of the Scottish Border, which garnered great acclaim across England. It brought amazement that such quality printing was being done in such a small town. After this success, Scott urged James to relocate to Edinburgh. After training his younger brother, Alexander, to run the Kelso Mail, James moved to Edinburgh in 1803 where he and Scott set up a publishing office that would publish Scott's works. Alexander would eventually purchase all the rights to the Kelso Mail in 1806. Scott loaned him £500 to help him get started and set up, which he did with two presses. These soon proved to be insufficient and the space too small with the amount of work coming in. He eventually settled his shop in Holyrood in 1805. Due to financial constraints despite the publisher's success, he joined into an ownership agreement with Scott who provided further capital. They had much success with the publishing of Scott's Lay of the Last Minstrel, Marmion and a number of other best sellers. Ballantyne also printed several of James Hogg's books, beginning with The Mountain Bard (1807).

In 1815, James married Christina Hogarth, with the condition from her father that he was debt free. Scott relieved James from his debts in return for complete ownership of James Ballantyne and Co. and James would work as a salaried manager. He became theatre critic of the Edinburgh Evening Courant.

In 1817, James, along with his brother-in-law George Hogarth, purchased the Edinburgh Weekly Journal where he acted as editor. His brother, John, was the musical and drama critic while George managed the finances.

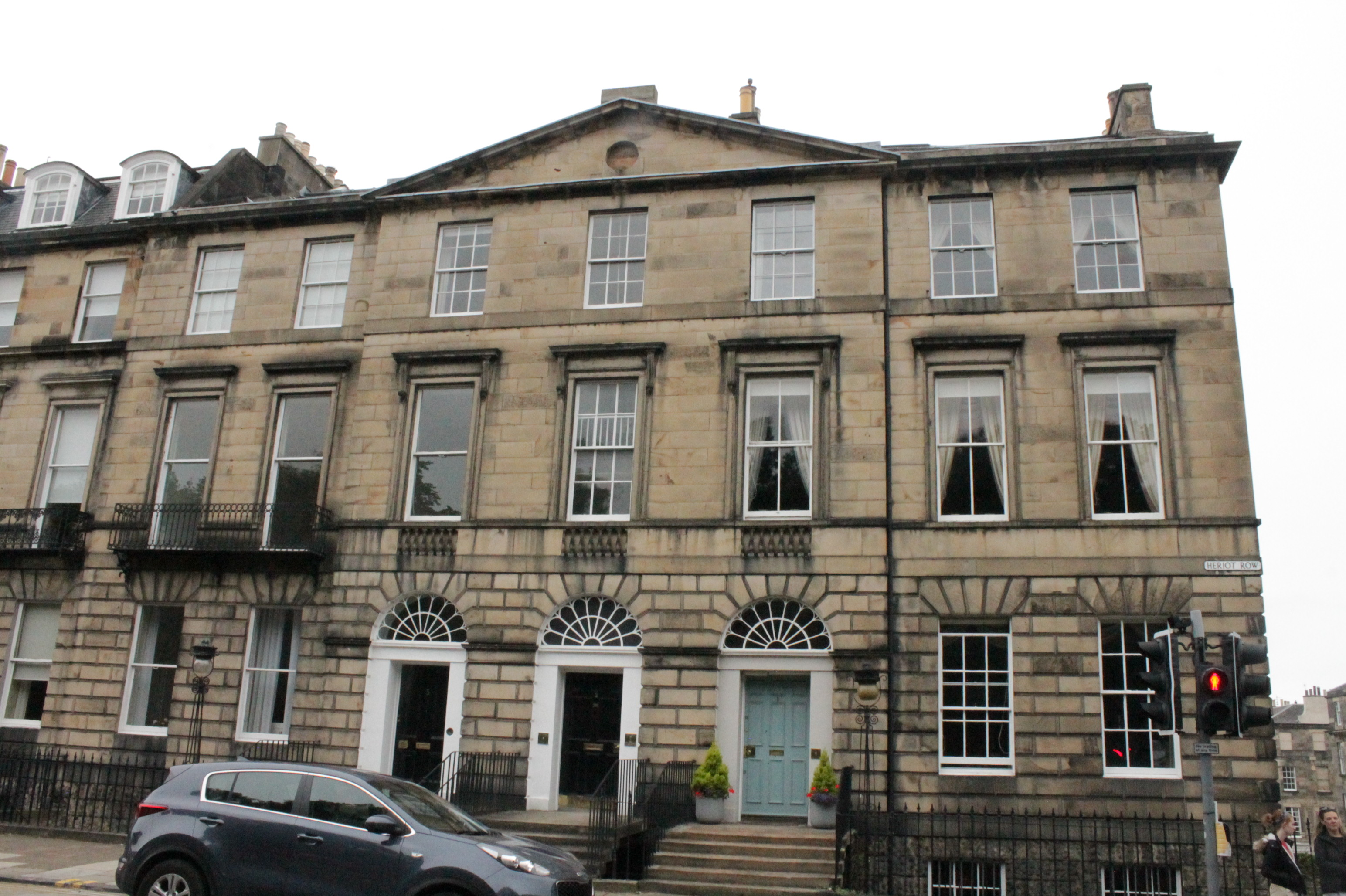
3, 2, 1 Heriot Row

In 1820 he was living at 10 St John Street off the Canongate in Edinburgh's Old Town.

Following the death of John Ballantyne in 1821, Scott promoted James from manager to personal agent and partner. This led to Alexander Ballantyne taking over the Weekly Journal as editor. While the company flourished, with business from both Scotland and England, and obtained a corner on printing legal stationery and official documents, debts continued to mount. Scott had been borrowing money to build Abbotsford House, his personal residence, instead of putting the money towards their debt. After this change in circumstance James moved to a new house at 3 Heriot Row: a ground floor and basement house within the end pavilion.

A collapse of the financial and publishing industries in 1825–26, led to the bankruptcy of Archibald Constable's publishing company, which published Scott's works, and also led to the failure of Ballantyne Press. This left James with responsibility for half of the company's debt, forcing him to sell his family valuables and new home. Scott publicly acknowledged his role in the business and used proceeds from his books to pay for the debts incurred. The debt was around £120,000.

Christina died in 1829 leaving James devastated. Scott died on 21 September 1832, followed shortly after by James on 26 January 1833. James's home address at the end of his life was 1 Hill Street in the centre of the city. Ballantyne Press was taken over by James's son, John Alexander Ballantyne, along with John Hughes. In December 1870, the press moved to Newington due to the growth of Waverley Edinburgh Station. The company's printing works ceased operations in 1916.

== Relationship with Sir Walter Scott ==
James and Scott worked together for over 30 years and had a close, yet complex relationship. James played a very big part in the success of Scott as a novelist. Not only did he print all of his works, he would also act as an editor. James would proofread, point out inconsistencies in the text details, fix grammatical and punctuation errors, give the whole work a scrubbing and offer advice on language and style. James was a personal agent and partner. Scott trusted James to make edits and amendments even throughout the production process.

Scott nicknamed both brothers, James and John, after characters in Henry Carey's burlesque Chrononhotonthologos. James was called Aldiborontiphoscophornio.

== Family ==
James is the brother of John Ballantyne, who was his business partner at times. His wife's brother, George Hogarth, was a well-known music critic and writer. He was the uncle, through his younger brother Alexander, of R. M. Ballantyne, Scottish author and artist. His niece, Catherine Hogarth, was the wife of Charles Dickens.

== In Fiction ==
The character Colbert (or 'Sleek Cobby') in John Paterson's Mare, James Hogg's allegorical satire on the Edinburgh publishing scene first published in the Newcastle Magazine in 1825, is based on James Ballantyne.
