= John Ballantyne (publisher) =

Scottish publisher (1774–1821)

- Born: 1774
- Died: 1821 (aged 46–47)
- Occupation: Publisher
- Relatives: James Ballantyne (brother); George Hogarth (brother-in-law); R. M. Ballantyne (nephew)

John Ballantyne (1774–1821) was a Scottish publisher notable for his work with Walter Scott, a pre-eminent author of the time.

== Biography ==
Ballantyne, younger brother of James Ballantyne the printer of Walter Scott's works, was born at Kelso in 1774. After spending a short time in the banking house of Currie & Co., London, he returned, in 1795, to Kelso, and became partner in his father's business as general merchant. On his marriage in 1797 the partnership was dissolved, one principal part of the business being resigned to him. Gradually he got into money difficulties, and, having disposed of his goods to pay his debts, went to Edinburgh in January 1806, to become clerk in his brother's printing establishment at a salary of £200 a year.

When Scott in 1808, on the ostensible ground of a misunderstanding with Messrs. Constable & Hunter, established the firm of John Ballantyne & Co., John Ballantyne was appointed manager at a salary of £300 a year and one-fourth of the profits. The private memorandum-book of Ballantyne records that already in 1809 the firm was getting into difficulties; and during the next three years their general speculations continued so uniformly unsuccessful, that in May 1813 Scott opened negotiations with Constable for pecuniary assistance in return for certain stock and copyright, including a share in some of Scott's own poems, and on a pledge of winding up the concerns of the firm as soon as possible.

Although Waverley was published by Constable in 1814, Scott, owing either, as stated by Lockhart, to the misrepresentations of John Ballantyne regarding Constable, or to the urgent necessity for more ready money than Constable was willing to advance, made arrangements in 1815 for the publication of Guy Mannering by Longman, and in the following year of the Tales of my Landlord by Murray. Lockhart states that Ballantyne, in negotiating with Constable in 1817 regarding a second series of Tales of my Landlord, so wrought on his jealousy by hinting at the possibility of dividing the series with Murray, that he 'agreed on the instant to do all that John shrank from asking, and at one sweep cleared the Augean stable in Hanover Street of unsaleable rubbish to the amount of £5,270'; but from a passage in the Life of Archibald Constable it would appear that this was not effected till a later period.

John Ballantyne, whom Scott continued to employ in all the negotiations regarding the publication of his works, had in 1813, on the advice of Constable, started as an auctioneer chiefly of books and works of art, an occupation well suited to his peculiar idiosyncrasies. As he had also made a stipulation with Constable that he was to have a third share in the profits of the Waverley Novels, he suffered no pecuniary loss by the dissolution of the old publishing firm. In addition to this, Scott, in 1820, gratuitously offered his services as editor of a Novelist's Library, to be published for his sole benefit. His easily won gains were devoted to the gratification of somewhat expensive tastes. At his villa on the Firth of Forth, which he had named ‘Harmony Hall’, and had 'invested with an air of dainty, voluptuous finery', he gave frequent elaborate Parisian dinners, among the guests at which was sure to be found 'whatever actor or singer of eminence visited Edinburgh'. He frequented foxhunts and race-meetings, and even at his auction 'appeared uniformly, hammer in hand, in the half-dress of some sporting club'. His imprudent pursuit of pleasure told gradually on his constitution, and after several years of shattered health he died at his brother's house in Edinburgh 16 June 1821.

Ballantyne is the author of a novel — The Widow's Lodgings — which, though stated by Lockhart to be 'wretched trash', reached a second edition. In his will he bequeathed to Sir Walter Scott a legacy of £2,000; but after his death it was found that his affairs were hopelessly bankrupt. In the antics and eccentricities of Ballantyne Scott discovered an inexhaustible fund of amusement; but he also cherished towards him a deep and sincere attachment. Standing beside his newly closed grave in Canongate churchyard, he whispered to Lockhart, 'I feel as if there would be less sunshine for me from this day forth'.
