= Drawcansir =

Fictional character in The Rehearsal

Drawcansir is a fictional character in George Villiers, 2nd Duke of Buckingham's farce The Rehearsal. He kills every one of the combatants, "sparing neither friend nor foe."
