= The Harmonicon =

Influential 19th-century English music journal

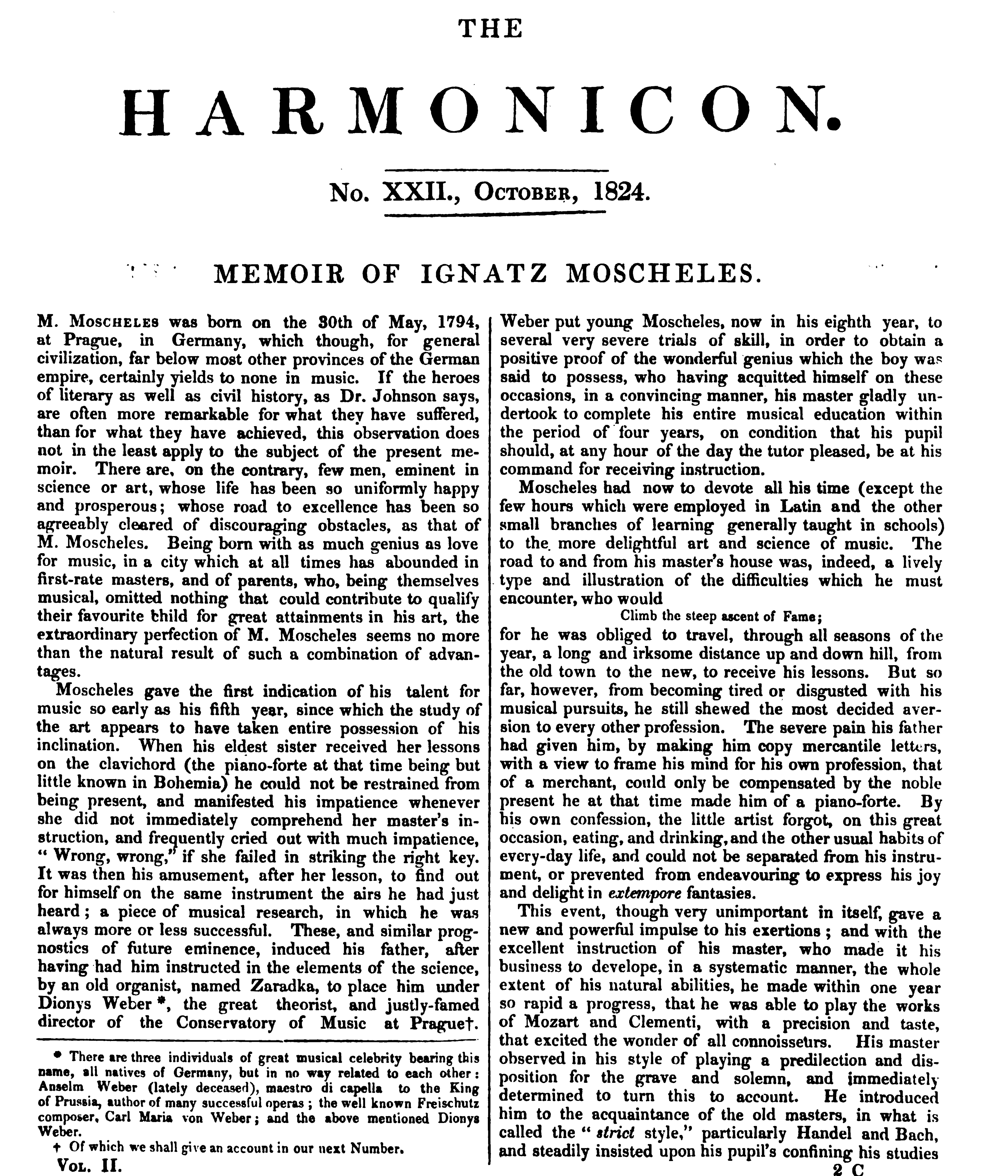
1824 The Harmonicon front page

The Harmonicon was an influential monthly journal of music published in London from 1823 to 1833. It was edited at one period by William Ayrton (1777–1858.) Issues contained articles on diverse topics, including reviews of musical compositions, reviews of concert and opera performances, news of contemporary musicians and composers, features on music theory and the physics of sound, and biographical sketches of important musical figures. George Hogarth was a regular contributor.
