= Hanging and Marriage =

Play by Henry Carey

- Written by: Henry Carey
- Original language: English
- Genre: Comedy

Premiere
- Date premiered: 15 March 1722
- Place premiered: Lincoln's Inn Fields Theatre

Hanging and Marriage is a 1722 farce by the British writer Henry Carey. Written as an afterpiece it premiered at Lincoln's Inn Fields Theatre accompanying a revival of Dryden's The Spanish Friar.

The original cast included William Bullock as Goodman Gizzard, James Spiller as Richard Stubble, John Egleton as Jerry and Jane Egleton as Mother Stubble.

== Bibliography ==
- Burling, William J. A Checklist of New Plays and Entertainments on the London Stage, 1700-1737. Fairleigh Dickinson Univ Press, 1992.
- Nicoll, Allardyce. A History of Early Eighteenth Century Drama: 1700-1750. CUP Archive, 1927.
