= Aldiborontiphoskyphorniostikos =

Aldiborontiphoskyphorniostikos: A round game for merry parties; with rules for playing the game
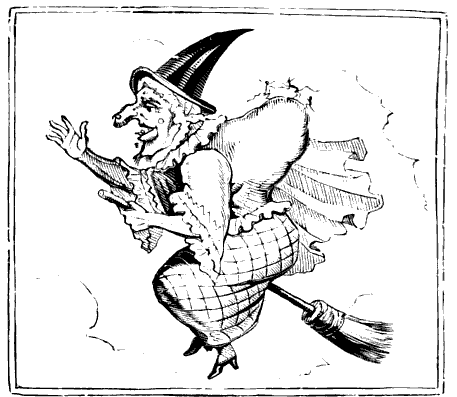
- ODDS NIPPERKINS! cried Mother Bunch on her broomstick
- Author: R Stennet
- Illustrator: Anonymous
- Language: English
- Subject: Alphabet
- Genre: Toy book/literary nonsense
- Publisher: Dean and Munday, Threadneedle Street; A. K. Newman and Co., Leadenhall Street
- Publication date: 1825
- Publication place: London, Britain
- Pages: 35

Aldiborontiphoskyphorniostikos was a book that contained a game in which players had to read the snippet for each letter of the alphabet as fast as they could without making a mistake. Alternatively, several players could read the snippets in a staggered manner. The snippets for each letter contain tongue-twisting mock-Latin names whose content is cumulatively appended at the end of each new letter snippet.

The book is based on Chrononhotonthologos, which in turn was based on Henry Fielding's Tom Thumb. The book was embellished with sixteen elegantly coloured engravings and sold for 1 shilling.

== Excerpt ==
The following is the entry for the letter O:

Odds Nipperkins! cried Mother Bunch on her broomstick, here’s a to do! as Nicholas Hotch-Potch said, Never were such Times, when Muley Hassan, Mufti of Moldavia, put on his Barnacles to see little Tweedle gobble them up, when Kia Khan Kreuse transmogrified them into Pippins, because Snip’s wife said, Illikipilliky, lass a-day! ’tis too bad to titter at a body, when Hamet el Mammet, the bottle-nosed Barber of Balsora, laug[h]ed ha! ha! ha! on beholding the Elephant spout mud over the ’Prentice, who pricked his trunk with a needle, while Dicky Snip the Taylor read the Proclamation of Chrononhotonthologos, offering a thousand sequins for taking Bombardinian, Bashaw of three tails, who killed Aldiborontiphoskyphorniostikos.
