= Martin Clifford =

Martin Clifford (c. 1624–1677) was an English writer, poet, and educator who served as master of the Charterhouse School. A prominent Restoration wit and freethinker, Clifford is most noteworthy for his influential 1674 book 'A Treatise of Humane Reason.'

== Life ==
He was educated at Westminster School, and in 1640 went to Trinity College, Cambridge, taking his bachelor's degree three years later (Cole MS. xlv. f. 265). After the Restoration of 1660 he was a man about town, with support from noblemen and courtiers. He was employed by George Villiers, 2nd Duke of Buckingham, along with Samuel Butler and Thomas Sprat, in producing The Rehearsal, a satirical play aimed specifically at John Dryden.

Clifford further attacked John Dryden, butt of The Rehearsal, in a series of letters; an edition of which was issued in 1687 long after the author's death. Dryden made no reply.

In 1671, Clifford was elected master of the Charterhouse, a post which he presumably owed to the influence of Buckingham. He died on 10 December 1677, and was buried on the 13th in the chancel of St. Margaret's, Westminster.

== Works ==
During the time of his mastership Clifford published anonymously ‘A Treatise of Humane Reason,’ London, 1674, which was reprinted the following year, and again in 1691 with the author's name on the title-page. It was answered the year following its issue by ‘Observations upon a Treatise,’ attributed to the Rev. Edward Stephens, and by ‘Plain-Dealing. … By A. M., a Countrey Gentleman.’ The last-named tract was in turn dealt with by Albertus Warren, who, at the end of his ‘Apology,’ 1680, left description of Clifford's person and habits. To Clifford, Sprat addressed his ‘Life of Cowley.’

== Notes ==
Attribution

This article incorporates text from a publication now in the public domain: "Clifford, Martin". Dictionary of National Biography. London: Smith, Elder & Co. 1885–1900.
