= Punt nua =

Irish parody currency

Punt Nua (English: 'new pound'; sign: PN£) was a parody currency and internet meme devised by Irish graphic designer, Con Kennedy. First published on Twitter in early December 2011, within hours of publishing, the images became a viral phenomenon. Articles featuring the proposed designs for Punt Nua appeared in the Irish Independent and in the Carlow People. In the following days, several other Irish and international media outlets covered the proposed designs.

== Origins and concept ==
Kennedy developed the concept of 'Punt Nua' after hearing numerous reports in the Irish media of a possible return to the Irish Pound after a possible exit from the Euro. Kennedy, who was a lecturer in IT Carlow at the time, devised his own interpretation of what the new currency may look like.

The designs for the parody notes featured those who Kennedy believed to be responsible for Ireland's economic problems, the post-2008 banking crisis and a possible exit from the single currency. This figures from Irish political life and the banking sector, used in the designs, included:

- Bertie Ahern
- Brian Lenihan Jnr
- Charlie McCreevy
- Brian Cowen
- David Drumm
- Seán FitzPatrick

The half uncial typeface used on the proposed designs for Punt Nua was designed by Kennedy in the 1990s.

== Media coverage ==
The notes were covered on several Irish current affairs and light entertainment programmes, including RTÉ's Saturday Night Show, The Daily Show and current affairs programmes, such as Radio 1's Liveline, TV3's Tonight with Vincent Browne, 98FM News and Inside Ireland.

Coverage of Punt Nua extended to international media such as Forbes.com and Finnish television station Yle. Punt Nua was also included, by the WorldIrish.com diaspora website, in a list of viral events from 2011.

An exhibition, titled Punt Nua: Creative Economics, was held in Dublin in June 2012.
