= Chrononhotonthologos =

1734 play by Henry Carey

Chrononhotonthologos is a satirical play by the English poet and songwriter Henry Carey from 1734. Although the play has been seen as nonsense verse, it was also seen and celebrated at the time as a satire on Robert Walpole and Queen Caroline, wife of George II.

The play is relatively short on the page, as it relies heavily upon its songs and theatrical effects for stage time. It concerns King Chrononhotonthologos and Queen Fadladinida of Queerummania who face an invasion by the Antipodeans (who are inverted people from the other side of the world). The king defeats the entire Antipodean army, leaving behind only the Antipodean king, who is taken to prison. The Queen sees the captive king, falls deeply in love, and mourns her virginity (for the king had never consummated their marriage). She prays to Cupid and Venus, and she gets her wish to lose her virginity and her husband. Chrononhotonthologos, in camp, takes offence at a piece of pork, slaps his general, and is killed by the raging general. The general creates a bloodbath before killing himself. The Queen is thus a widow maid and is free to marry the king's courtiers. The two courtiers take offense at her preference, and so she decides merely to pay them each night for their sexual services. The play ends thereupon with all well.

An 1818 playbill from Nova Scotia for a performance of Chrononhotonthologos and other "old" plays

== Parody ==
The play is a parody of opera and of theatrical spectacle at the same time that it is itself a spectacular. The Antipodeans, who have their heads where their midsections should be, who walk upon their hands, etc., advance in columns (literally standing upon each other) rather than ranks, and the performance has a great dumbshow with them. The captured Antipodean king in his cell (the only Antipodean who would need to be in the stage foreground) was most likely a special effect himself, as he has no lines. The dances that are indicated throughout, several of which without apparent motivation, are similarly present simply for the effect on the senses.

In general, the play burlesques the absurdity of operatic plots, as well as the most inexplicable habits of contemporary tragedy. Carey consistently undercuts the lofty expectations of the kingdom-in-crisis plot by having the feared enemy be the Antipodean (or Acrostic) and by having the characters travesty the repetitive verse of tragedy. When King Chrononhotonthologos visits General Bombardinian in his tent after single-handedly destroying the Antipodean army with a glare, the general orders,

Traverse from Pole to Pole; sail round the World,
Bring every Eatable that can be eat:
The King shall eat, tho' all Mankind be starv'd.

— I. v, 11–14

and then backtracks to announce that they only have pork. The King takes deadly offense at being offered pork, and so he slaps the general, and the general's heroic pride forces him to stab the king in return. When the general regrets his regicide, he calls out, in a parody of Richard III,

Go, call a Coach, and let a Coach be call'd,
And let the Man that calls it be the Caller;
And, in his calling, let him nothing call,
But Coach! Coach! Coach! O for a Coach ye Gods!

When the doctor confirms the king's death, Bombardinian tells him to go to the next world and fetch the king's soul back (and stabs him), only to say to the air, in mock tragic grief, "Call'st thou Chrononhotonthologos?/ I come! your Faithful Bombardinian comes" and kills himself. If this arbitrary bloodbath (motivated by the king's hyperbolic vanity and the general's hyperbolic pride) is not enough of a deflation, when the Queen comes in to bewail her virginity, her lady simply says,

"I'll fit you with a Husband in a Trice;
Here's Rigdum Funnidos, a proper Man,
If anyone can please a Queen, he can

— I. v 61–4)

When Rigdum Funnidos's fellow courtier Aldiborontiphoscofornio declares that he must be king or die, the queen replies,

Well, Gentlemen, to make the Matter easy,
I'll have you both, and that, I hope will please ye.

Deciding at last that marriage is complicated (after her lady offers a formulaic complaint about marriage), the Queen concludes the play:

Gentlemen! I'm not for Marriage,
But, according to your Carriage,
As you both behave to Night,
You shall be paid to Morrow.

The parody of bad tragedy and inflated spectacular also occurs in the names involved. These tongue twisters are nonsense, but they are also parodies of the ignorantly contrived exotic names used by contemporary opera and tragedy. Where William Shakespeare and Thomas Otway had chosen foreign locations for their plays to mask the fact that they were commenting upon England, by the 1730s a strange-sounding foreign location was a generic expectation of tragedy. More important than the linguistic parody, however, is the parody in the characterization. King Chrononhotonthologos begins the play offended by sleeplessness, declaring,

These Royal Eyes thou (Somnus) never more shall close.
Henceforth let no Man sleep, on Pain of Death:
Instead of Sleep, let pompous Pageantry,
And solemn Show, with sonorous Solemnity,
Keep all Mankind eternally awake.
Bid Harlequino decorate the Stage
With all Magnificence of Decoration....

— I. i. 63–7

The king's overblown greatness is such that those royal eyes are enough to destroy the entire enemy army. The queen orders about the sky and stars. The general demands that the entire earth be conquered so that the king might have a meal. This repeated hyperbole is pushed to the point of absurdity to create a burlesque of opera's impossible characters. On the one hand, these parodies are superficially delightful and satirically a relief from the bombast of hack-written and alloyed tragedy, but, on the other hand, they are part of a darker political satire taking place in the play.

== Political satire ==
Henry Carey was a Tory, or an anti-Walpolean, and he identified with Alexander Pope, in particular, in his stance on the 18th century's cultural polemic (see Augustan poetry for the issues behind Ambrose Philips and Alexander Pope's poison pen battle). Pope had been a consistent enemy of Ambrose Philips's, and Philips was a stand-in for an entire slate of Whig political views. Attacking Philips was attacking what Philips stood for, and Carey achieved fame first by satirizing Philips's second set of odes (which had been dedicated to Robert Walpole) with his Namby Pamby. Namby Pamby had made Carey one of the darlings of the Tory opposition to Walpole.

In 1728, John Gay's The Beggar's Opera had satirized Robert Walpole and opera, both, and it had proven enormously successful. However, Walpole had Gay's follow up, Polly, suppressed. Walpole's direct intervention in the stage prompted a new round of satires, including Chrononhotonthologos. However, Chrononhotonthologos is a far more dangerously political satire than Gay's The Beggar's Opera or Henry Fielding's Tom Thumb had been. Tom Thumb (1732) had introduced a parody of operatic plots and Walpole by focusing on a mythical kingdom where the queen would fall in love with an absurd character, but Carey goes much further by having the Queen fall in love with an absurd character and then walk away with two unrelated and unmotivated characters while, at the same time, having the king die due to vanity.

The real life political events that are partially encoded in the play concern Caroline of Ansbach and George II. In the 1720s, George II, then Prince of Wales, had opposed his father bitterly and aligned himself with the Tory party, while his father fostered Robert Walpole (thanks to Walpole's playing up of suggestions that the Tories disapproved of the Hanoverian succession). Because of his fears of Jacobites, George I kept Walpole in power, while George II favored anyone else. George II's mistress, Mrs Howard, was a strong Tory and a woman who favored John Gay and others of the Tory wits. Toward the end of George I's life, Caroline of Ansbach attempted a reconciliation of father with son, and when George II came to the throne, she was the one who pushed for Robert Walpole. Mrs. Howard's influence was diminished to nothing, and George II, although still disliking his wife, did not involve himself in politics, leaving the field clear for her to continue to give power to Robert Walpole.

John Gay had been promised patronage by Mrs. Howard, and that doomed his chances when George II became king, for it earned him the enmity of Queen Caroline. The friends and admirers of Gay (including Alexander Pope and Henry Carey) regarded this political game as a personal and moral betrayal. Chrononhotonthologos, therefore, is not innocent in its depiction of a queen who never makes love with her husband, a husband who has no idea about politics but only wishes to be flattered, and, most particularly, of a queen who falls in love with contrariness and takes two minor ministers as her competing gigolos.

These political and topical allusions are not necessary for contemporary readers and viewers of the play. The nonsense verse and the immediate parody of opera are entertaining, but the political satire hidden beneath the frivolity was one component of the play's success.

== Context ==
Chrononhotonthologos occupies a central position in the development of English nonsense verse. Carey's word play appears to exist for its own sake, and the sounds of words are one source of amusement. Additionally, like other nonsense verse, the writing plays with and parodies a well identified genre of high seriousness. The nonsense achieves part of its humor by fulfilling the structural and phonetic requirements of an extant form, but substituting silly syllables for meaningful ones, thereby allowing the listener or reader to enjoy the suggestion that the usual words are empty placeholders (e.g. when Jonathan Swift's King of Lilliput has a royal title ending in "Ully Mully Goo," the nonsense sounds and weighs the same as the titles of real kings and, implicitly, is just as meaningful). Later authors, like Edward Lear, would cite Carey as a precursor. The characters' names in particular construct or perform an identity and build an expectation of character Performativity and an ongoing usage, thus Aldiborontiphoscofornio became Aldiborontiphoskyphorniostikos in an 1820s parlor game or referenced as Aldobrantifoscofornio in Norman Lindsay's The Magic Pudding (1910).

The play is also one of the first examples of a parodic opera. Although The Dragon of Wantley would be more fully an opera, Chrononhotonthologos is a spectacular that is also an exaggeration of spectaculars. There had been farce spectacles before. In the era of the competing playhouses and the Restoration spectacular, the playhouses that had no capacity for special effects put on farces of the plays they could not stage. However, those plays had concentrated more specifically on effects than on the total experience of bombast, unmotivated dance, pompous music, and special effects, and Carey's play attacks not a specific rival, but an entire genre.

Finally, in the context of Augustan drama, Carey's play contributed to the sentiment that led to the establishment of the Licensing Act 1737, when the theaters would be subject to official censorship. After the successes of Tom Thumb and Chrononhotonthologos, theaters staged increasingly vicious attacks on the ministry. These satires were progressively more dangerously near an attack on the crown.

== See also ==
- Augustan drama
- Augustan literature
