= Namby-pamby =

Poem written by Henry Carey

Namby-pamby is a term for affected, weak, and maudlin speech/verse. It originates from the poem Namby Pamby (1725) by Henry Carey.

Carey wrote his poem as a satire of Ambrose Philips and published it in his Poems on Several Occasions. Its first publication was Namby Pamby: or, a panegyrick on the new versification address'd to A----- P----, where the A-- P-- implicated Ambrose Philips. Philips had written a series of odes in a new prosody of seven-syllable catalectic trochaic tetrameter and dedicated it to "all ages and characters, from Walpole steerer of the realm, to Miss Pulteney in the nursery." Though once used by Shakespeare in A Midsummer Night's Dream, this 3.5' line became a matter of consternation for more conservative poets, and a matter of mirth for Carey. Carey adopts Philips's choppy line-form for his parody and latches onto the dedication to nurseries to create an apparent nursery rhyme that is, in fact, a grand bit of nonsense and satire mixed.

Philips was a figure who had become politically active and was a darling of the Whig party. He was also a target of the Tory satirists. Alexander Pope had criticized Philips repeatedly (in The Guardian and in his Peri Bathos, among other places), and praising or condemning Philips was a political as much as poetic matter in the 1720s, with the nickname also employed by John Gay and Jonathan Swift.

The poem begins with a mock-epic opening (as had Pope's Rape of the Lock and as had Dryden's MacFlecknoe), calling all the muses to witness the glory of Philips's prosodic reform:

"All ye Poets of the Age!
All ye Witlings of the Stage!
Learn your Jingles to reform!
Crop your Numbers and Conform:
Let your little Verses flow
Gently, Sweetly, Row by Row:
Let the Verse the Subject fit;
Little Subject, Little Wit.
Namby-Pamby is your Guide;
Albion's Joy, Hibernia's Pride."

Carey's Namby Pamby had enormous success. It became so successful that people began to call Philips himself "Namby Pamby" (as, for example, in The Dunciad in 1727), as he had been renamed by the poem, and Carey was referred to as "Namby Pamby Carey". The poem sold well and he used this style in various other short poems.

== See also ==
- 1725 in poetry
