= George Hogarth =

Scottish lawyer, newspaper editor, musicologist (1783–1870)

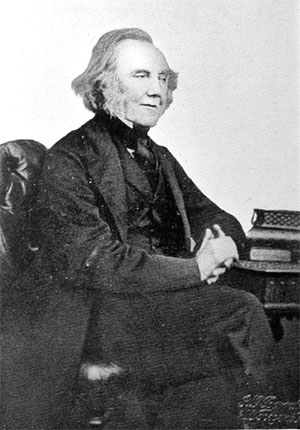
- Born: George Hogarth; 6 September 1783; Carfraemill, near Lauder, Berwickshire, Scotland
- Died: 12 February 1870 (aged 86); London, England
- Burial place: Kensal Green Cemetery
- Education: University of Edinburgh
- Occupations: Lawyer, newspaper editor, music critic, musicologist
- Spouse: Georgina Thomson (m. 1814)
- Children: 10, including Catherine and Georgina
- Relatives: James Ballantyne (brother-in-law)

George Hogarth WS (6 September 1783 – 12 February 1870) was a Scottish lawyer, newspaper editor, music critic, and musicologist. He authored several books on opera and Victorian musical life in addition to contributing articles to various publications.

== Life ==
Born in Carfraemill near Lauder in Berwickshire, George Hogarth was the eldest son of Robert Hogarth, a farmer, and his wife, Mary Hogarth (née Scott).

Hogarth studied law and music at the University of Edinburgh and became a violoncellist and a composer, and acted as joint secretary to the Edinburgh Music Festival. He practised law during the first two decades of the 19th century; counting among his clients Sir Walter Scott. On 30 May 1814, Hogarth married Georgina Thomson, the daughter of music publisher and editor George Thomson, their marriage producing 10 children. In 1817, Hogarth, his brother-in-law James Ballantyne and Walter Scott bought the Edinburgh Weekly Journal. He lived then at 2 Nelson Street in Edinburgh's Second New Town. He moved to 19 Albany street in the late 1820s.

He first worked as a music critic for The Harmonicon and the Edinburgh Courant magazine during the 1820s, continuing with The Harmonicon in the early 1830s, after moving his family to London. In 1831, Hogarth was editor of a pro-Tory newspaper the Western Luminary, then in 1832 moved to Halifax becoming the first editor of the Halifax Guardian. In 1834, he became a music critic for The Morning Chronicle newspaper in London, and in 1835 he became editor-in-chief of The Evening Chronicle, a post he held for twenty years.

From 1846 to 1866 he worked as a music critic for The Daily News, a paper that was founded by novelist Charles Dickens. Hogarth had previously met Dickens in 1834 while they were both working for the Morning Chronicle. In 1836, Dickens married Hogarth's eldest daughter Catherine. One of his younger daughters, Georgina, was Dickens' housekeeper, adviser, and, after Dickens' death, the editor of The Letters Of Charles Dickens from 1833 to 1870. From 1850 to 1864, Hogarth served as the Royal Philharmonic Society's Secretary. During the last years of his life, he worked as an editor for the Evening Chronicle.

Hogarth died in London in 1870, at the age of 86. He is buried in Kensal Green Cemetery.

== Children ==
1. Catherine Thomson Hogarth (19 May 1815 – 22 November 1879), who married Charles Dickens and had ten children.
2. Robert Hogarth (10 September 1816 – 1843), died aged 26 in Jamaica.
3. Mary Scott Hogarth (26 October 1819 – 7 May 1837), lived at the Dickens residence, where she died aged 17.
4. George Thomson Hogarth (26 April 1821 – 1841), died aged 19 in India.
5. William Thomson Hogarth (11 January 1823), died in Australia.
6. James Ballantyne Hogarth (1825 – 1872), died in Australia.
7. Georgina Hogarth (22 January 1827 – 19 April 1917),
8. Helen Isabella Hogarth (28 October 1833 – 1 December 1890), who married Richard Cusack Roney and had a son.
9. Edward Norris Hogarth (1834 – 20 March 1879)

== Works ==
- Lives of celebrated musicians : Beethoven (1800, London: R. Cocks & Co.)
- Musical history, biography, and criticism: being a general survey of music, from the earliest period to the present time (1835, London: J.W. Parker)
- Memoirs of the musical drama, Vol. 1 (1838, London: R. Bentley)
- Memoirs of the musical drama, Vol. 2 (1838, London: R. Bentley)
- Musical history, biography, and criticism, Vol. 1 (1838, New York: Da Capo Press)
- Musical history, biography, and criticism, Vol. 2 (1838, New York: Da Capo Press)
- Memoirs of the opera in Italy, France, Germany, and England, Vol. 1 (1851, London: R. Bentley)
- Memoirs of the opera in Italy, France, Germany, and England, Vol. 2 (1851, London: R. Bentley)

== Sources ==
- John Warrack, "Hogarth, George (1783–1870)", Oxford Dictionary of National Biography, 2004
