= Johanna Charlotte Unzer =

German philosopher and writer (1724–1782)

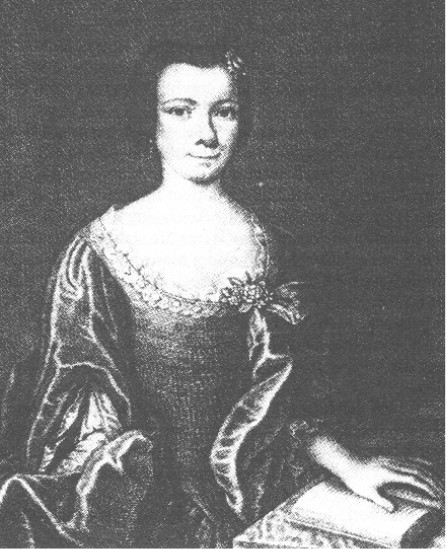
- Born: Johanna Charlotte Ziegler; 17 November 1724 Halle an der Saale
- Died: 29 January 1782 (aged 57) Altona, Hamburg
- Occupation: Philosopher, poet
- Genre: Anacreontic poetry

Johanna Charlotte Unzer (née Ziegler) (17 November 1724 in Halle an der Saale — 29 January 1782 in Altona, Hamburg), was a German writer and philosopher, famed for her progressive views on women's education. She was awarded the imperial Dichterkrone in 1753. She is known for her anacreontic poetry.

== Biography ==
Johanna Charlotte Ziegler was born in Halle an der Saale, a university town and center for pietism. Her father was an organist, composer, and music teacher who studied with Johann Sebastian Bach. Her mother was from a line of clock makers.

She was educated at home with a series of tutors, mainly students of her father or her uncle, Johann Gottlob Krüger, a professor of medicine. In 1751, one of these tutors—the medical student Johann August Unzer—asked for her hand in marriage. He moved to Altona shortly after and they corresponded about philosophy. Based on these letters, she wrote the groundbreaking treatise Grundriß einer Weltweißheit für das Frauenzimmer (Fundamentals of Philosophy for Women), a work intended to be read by women who were interested in philosophy but did not know where to start. In 1753, she was contributing poetry to two periodicals, and she was crowned poet laureate of the University of Helmstedt. Unzer became an honorary member of two literary societies, the Deutsche Gesellschaften of Göttingen and Helmstedt. Unzer published a new volume of poetry in 1754. After a long silence, she published three more books in 1766, and in 1767 Unzer published a revised edition of her Grundriß, including an expanded section on natural history. Unzer died at the age of 57.

== Writings and philosophy ==
=== Anacreontics ===
Unzer was a significant German woman writer of "anacreontic" poetry. She wrote drinking songs "laden with pastoral allusions, songs of cheerful flirtation, rationalist odes and nature poems."

== Published works ==
Johanna Charlotte Unzer's published works as cited by An Encyclopedia of Continental Women Writers.

- Grundriß einer Weltweißheit für das Frauenzimmer [Fundamentals of Comprehensive Knowledge for Ladies], 1751.
- Grundriß einer natürlichen Historie und eigentlichen Naturlehre für das Frauenzimmer [Fundamentals of Natural History and of Nature Study Itself for Ladies], 1751.
- Versuch in Scherzgedichten [Experiment in Witty Poems], 1751.
- Versuch in sittlichen und zärtlichen Gedichten [Experiment in moral and tender poems], 1754.
- Fortgesetzte Versuche in sittlichen und zärtlichen Gedichten [Continued Experiments in moral and tender poems], 1766.

As cited in the Sophie German women's database (published posthumously):

- Nachricht, Frankfurt am Main, 1991
- Der Sieg der Liebe, Frankfurt am Main, 1991.
- Die Sommernacht, Frankfurt am Main, 1991.
