= Parody =

Imitative work created humorously from original work

A parody is a creative work designed to imitate, comment on, and/or mock its subject by means of satirical or ironic imitation. A parody may also be known as a spoof, a satire, a send-up, a take-off, a lampoon, a play on (something), or a caricature. Often a parody's subject is an original work or some aspect of it (theme/content, author, style, etc.), but a parody can also be about a real-life person (e.g. a politician), event, or movement (e.g. the French Revolution or 1960s counterculture). Literary scholar Professor Simon Dentith defines parody as "any cultural practice which provides a relatively polemical allusive imitation of another cultural production or practice". The literary theorist Linda Hutcheon said "parody ... is imitation, not always at the expense of the parodied text." Parody may be found in art or culture, including literature, music, theater, television and film, animation, and gaming.

The writer and critic John Gross observes in his Oxford Book of Parodies, that parody seems to flourish on territory somewhere between pastiche ("a composition in another artist's manner, without satirical intent") and burlesque (which "fools around with the material of high literature and adapts it to low ends"). Meanwhile, the Encyclopédie of Denis Diderot distinguishes between the parody and the burlesque, "A good parody is a fine amusement, capable of amusing and instructing the most sensible and polished minds; the burlesque is a miserable buffoonery which can only please the populace." Historically, when a formula grows tired, as in the case of the moralistic melodramas in the 1910s, it retains value only as a parody, as demonstrated by the Buster Keaton shorts that mocked that genre.

== Origins ==
According to Aristotle (Poetics, ii. 5), Hegemon of Thasos was the inventor of a kind of parody; by slightly altering the wording in well-known poems he transformed the sublime into the ridiculous. In ancient Greek literature, a parodia was a narrative poem imitating the style and prosody of epics "but treating light, satirical or mock-heroic subjects". Indeed, the components of the Greek word are παρά para "beside, counter, against" and ᾠδή oide "song". Thus, the original Greek word παρῳδία parodia has sometimes been taken to mean "counter-song", an imitation that is set against the original. The Oxford English Dictionary, for example, defines parody as imitation "turned as to produce a ridiculous effect". Because par- also has the non-antagonistic meaning of beside, "there is nothing in parodia to necessitate the inclusion of a concept of ridicule."

In Greek Old Comedy even the gods could be made fun of. The Frogs portrays the hero-turned-god Heracles as a glutton and the God of Drama Dionysus as cowardly and unintelligent. The traditional trip to the Underworld story is parodied as Dionysus dresses as Heracles to go to the Underworld, in an attempt to bring back a poet to save Athens. The Ancient Greeks created satyr plays which parodied tragic plays, often with performers dressed like satyrs.

Parody was used in early Greek philosophical texts to make philosophical points. Such texts are known as spoudaiogeloion, a famous example of which is the Silloi by Pyrrhonist philosopher Timon of Phlius which parodied philosophers living and dead. The style was a rhetorical mainstay of the Cynics and was the most common tone of the works made by Menippus and Meleager of Gadara.

In the 2nd century CE, Lucian of Samosata created a parody of travel texts such as Indica and The Odyssey. He described the authors of such accounts as liars who had never traveled, nor ever talked to any credible person who had. In his ironically named book True History Lucian delivers a story which exaggerates the hyperbole and improbable claims of those stories. Sometimes described as the first science fiction, the characters travel to the Moon, engage in interplanetary war with the help of aliens they meet there, and then return to Earth to experience civilization inside a 200-mile-long creature generally interpreted as being a whale. This is a parody of Ctesias' claims that India has a one-legged race of humans with a single foot so huge it can be used as an umbrella, Homer's stories of one-eyed giants, and so on.

== Related terms ==
Parody exists in the following related genres: satire, travesty, pastiche, skit, burlesque.

=== Satire ===
Satires and parodies are both derivative works that exaggerate their source material(s) in humorous ways. However, a satire is meant to make fun of the real world, whereas a parody is a derivative of a specific work ("specific parody") or a general genre ("general parody" or "spoof"). Furthermore, satires are provocative and critical as they point to a specific vice associated with an individual or a group of people to mock them into correction or as a form of punishment. In contrast, parodies are more focused on producing playful humor and do not always attack or criticize its targeted work and/or genre. Of course, it is possible for a parody to maintain satiric elements without crossing into satire itself, as long as its "light verse with modest aspirations" ultimately dominates the work.

=== Travesty ===
A travesty imitates and transforms a work, but focuses more on the satirization of it. Because satire is meant to attack someone or something, the harmless playfulness of parody is lost.

=== Pastiche ===
A pastiche imitates a work as a parody does, but unlike a parody, pastiche is neither transformative of the original work, nor is it humorous. Literary critic Fredric Jameson has referred to the pastiche as a "blank parody", or "parody that has lost its sense of humor".

=== Skit ===
Skits imitate works "in a satirical regime". But unlike travesties, skits do not transform the source material.

=== Burlesque ===
The burlesque primarily targets heroic poems and theater to degrade popular heroes and gods, as well as mock the common tropes within the genre. Simon Dentith has described this type of parody as "parodic anti-heroic drama".

=== Spoof ===
A parody imitates and mocks a specific, recognizable work (e.g. a book, movie, etc.) or the characteristic style of a particular author. A spoof mocks an entire genre by exaggerating its conventions and cliches for humorous effect.

== Music ==
In classical music, as a technical term, parody refers to a reworking of one kind of composition into another (for example, a motet into a keyboard work as Girolamo Cavazzoni, Antonio de Cabezón, and Alonso Mudarra all did to Josquin des Prez motets). More commonly, a parody mass (missa parodia) or an oratorio used extensive quotation from other vocal works such as motets or cantatas; Victoria, Palestrina, Lassus, and other composers of the 16th century used this technique. The term is also sometimes applied to procedures common in the Baroque period, such as when Bach reworks music from cantatas in his Christmas Oratorio.

The musicological definition of the term parody has now generally been supplanted by a more general meaning of the word. In its more contemporary usage, musical parody usually has humorous, even satirical intent, in which familiar musical ideas or lyrics are lifted into a different, often incongruous, context. Musical parodies may imitate or refer to the peculiar style of a composer or artist, or even a general style of music. For example, "The Ritz Roll and Rock", a song and dance number performed by Fred Astaire in the movie Silk Stockings, parodies the rock and roll genre. Conversely, while the best-known work of "Weird Al" Yankovic is based on particular popular songs, it also often utilises wildly incongruous elements of pop culture for comedic effect.

== English term ==
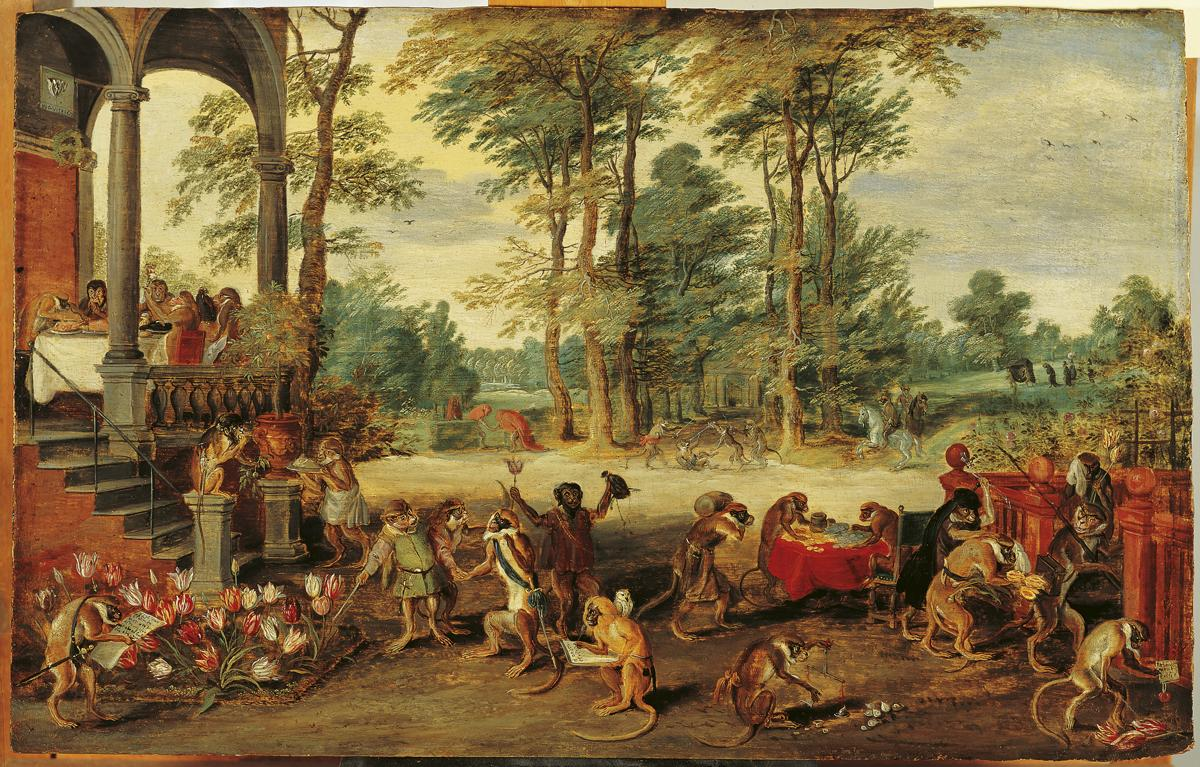
Allegory of the Tulipomania , persiflage on the tulip mania, by Jan Brueghel the Younger (1640s)

The first usage of the word parody in English cited in the Oxford English Dictionary is in Ben Jonson, in Every Man in His Humour in 1598: "A Parodie, a parodie! to make it absurder than it was." The next citation comes from John Dryden in 1693, who also appended an explanation, suggesting that the word was in common use, meaning to make fun of or re-create what you are doing.

== Modernist and post-modernist parody ==
Since the 20th century, parody has been heightened as the central and most representative artistic device, the catalysing agent of artistic creation and innovation. This most prominently happened in the second half of the century with postmodernism, but earlier modernism and Russian formalism had anticipated this perspective. For the Russian formalists, parody was a way of liberation from the background text that enables to produce new and autonomous artistic forms.

Historian Christopher Rea writes that "In the 1910s and 1920s, writers in China's entertainment market parodied anything and everything. ... They parodied speeches, advertisements, confessions, petitions, orders, handbills, notices, policies, regulations, resolutions, discourses, explications, sutras, memorials to the throne, and conference minutes. We have an exchange of letters between the Queue and the Beard and Eyebrows. We have a eulogy for a chamber pot. We have 'Research on Why Men Have Beards and Women Don't,' 'A Telegram from the Thunder God to His Mother Resigning His Post,' and 'A Public Notice from the King of Whoring Prohibiting Playboys from Skipping Debts.'"

Jorge Luis Borges's (1939) short story "Pierre Menard, Author of the Quixote", is often regarded as predicting postmodernism and conceiving the ideal of the ultimate parody. In the broader sense of Greek parodia, parody can occur when whole elements of one work are lifted out of their context and reused, not necessarily to be ridiculed. Traditional definitions of parody usually only discuss parody in the stricter sense of something intended to ridicule the text it parodies. There is also a broader, extended sense of parody that may not include ridicule, and may be based on many other uses and intentions. The broader sense of parody, parody done with intent other than ridicule, has become prevalent in the modern parody of the 20th century. In the extended sense, the modern parody does not target the parodied text, but instead uses it as a weapon to target something else. The reason for the prevalence of the extended, recontextualizing type of parody in the 20th century is that artists have sought to connect with the past while registering differences brought by modernity. Major modernist examples of this recontextualizing parody include James Joyce's Ulysses, which incorporates elements of Homer's Odyssey in a 20th-century Irish context, and T. S. Eliot's The Waste Land, which incorporates and recontextualizes elements of a vast range of prior texts, including Dante's The Inferno. The work of Andy Warhol is another prominent example of the modern "recontextualizing" parody. According to French literary theorist Gérard Genette, the most rigorous and elegant form of parody is also the most economical, that is a minimal parody, the one that literally reprises a known text and gives it a new meaning.

Blank parody, in which an artist takes the skeletal form of an art work and places it in a new context without ridiculing it, is common. Pastiche is a closely related genre, and parody can also occur when characters or settings belonging to one work are used in a humorous or ironic way in another, such as the transformation of minor characters Rosencrantz and Guildenstern from Shakespeare's drama Hamlet into the principal characters in a comedic perspective on the same events in the play (and film) Rosencrantz and Guildenstern Are Dead. Similarly, Mishu Hilmy's Trapped in the Netflix uses parody to deconstruct contemporary Netflix shows like Mad Men providing commentary through popular characters. Don Draper mansplaining about mansplaining, Luke Danes monologizing about a lack of independence while embracing codependency. In Flann O'Brien's novel At Swim-Two-Birds, for example, mad King Sweeney, Finn MacCool, a pookah, and an assortment of cowboys all assemble in an inn in Dublin: the mixture of mythic characters, characters from genre fiction, and a quotidian setting combine for a humor that is not directed at any of the characters or their authors. This combination of established and identifiable characters in a new setting is not the same as the post-modernist trope of using historical characters in fiction out of context to provide a metaphoric element.

== Reputation ==
Sometimes the reputation of a parody outlasts the reputation of what is being parodied. For example, Don Quixote, which mocks the traditional knight errant tales, is much better known than the novel that inspired it, Amadis de Gaula (although Amadis is mentioned in the book). Another case is the novel Shamela by Henry Fielding (1742), which was a parody of the gloomy epistolary novel Pamela, or Virtue Rewarded (1740) by Samuel Richardson. Many of Lewis Carroll's parodies of Victorian didactic verse for children, such as "You Are Old, Father William", are much better known than the (largely forgotten) originals. Stella Gibbons's comic novel Cold Comfort Farm has eclipsed the pastoral novels of Mary Webb which largely inspired it.

In more recent times, the television sitcom 'Allo 'Allo! is perhaps better known than the drama Secret Army which it parodies.

Some artists carve out careers by making parodies. One of the best-known examples is that of "Weird Al" Yankovic. His career of parodying other musical acts and their songs has outlasted many of the artists or bands he has parodied. Yankovic is not required under law to get permission to parody; as a personal rule, however, he does seek permission to parody a person's song before recording it. Several artists, such as rapper Chamillionaire and Seattle-based grunge band Nirvana stated that Yankovic's parodies of their respective songs were excellent, and many artists have considered being parodied by him to be a badge of honor.

In the US legal system the point that in most cases a parody of a work constitutes fair use was upheld in the case of Rick Dees, who decided to use 29 seconds of the music from the song When Sonny Gets Blue to parody Johnny Mathis' singing style even after being refused permission. An appeals court upheld the trial court's decision that this type of parody represents fair use. Fisher v. Dees 794 F.2d 432 (9th Cir. 1986)

== Film parodies ==
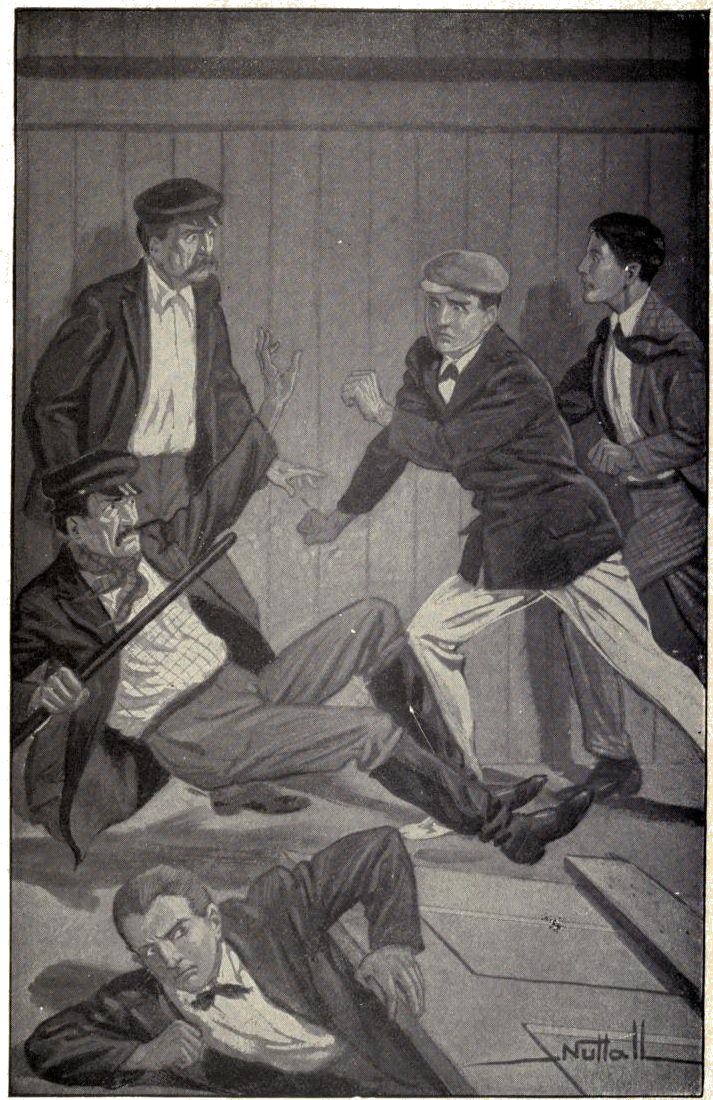
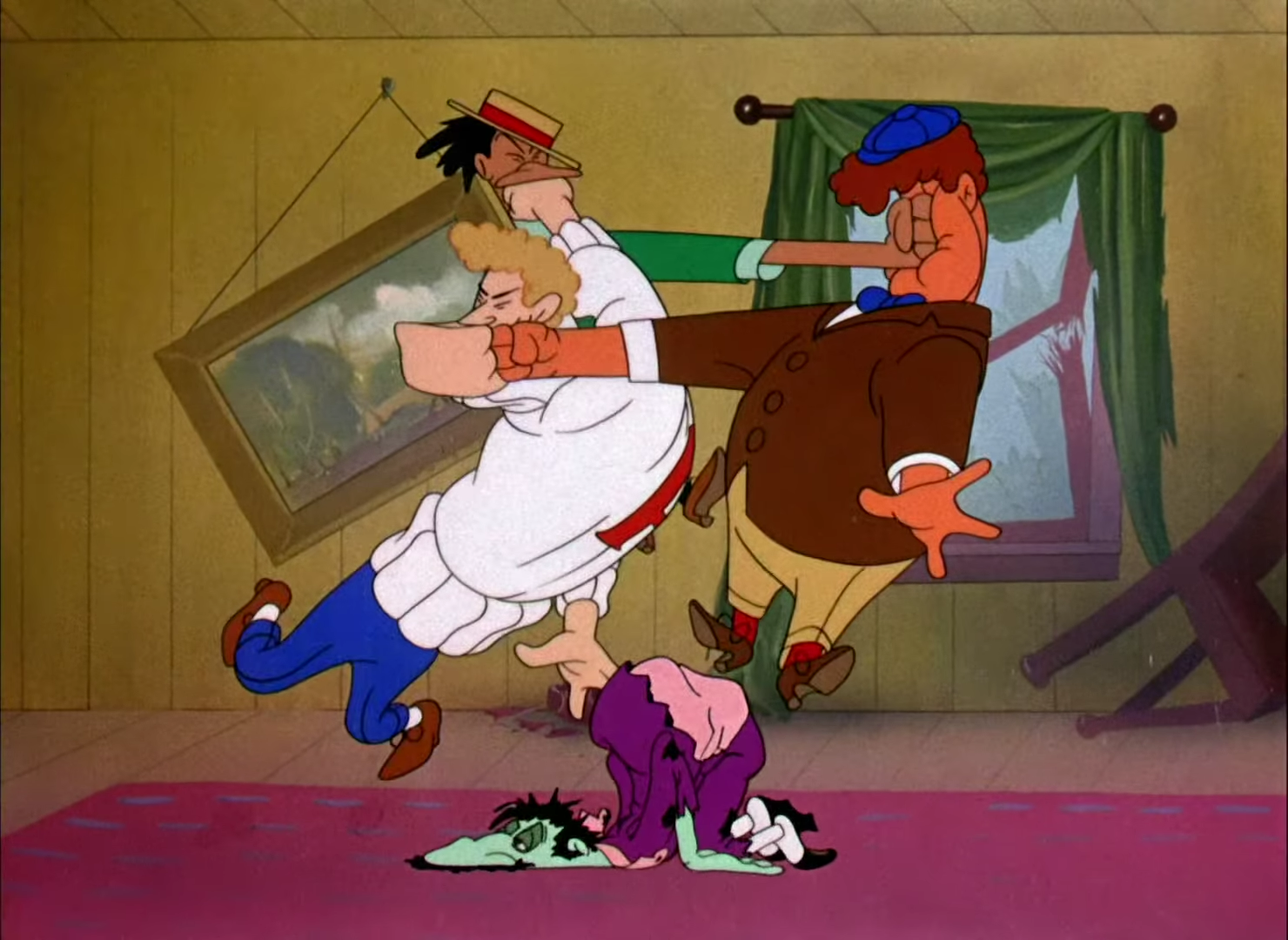
The Rover Boys books (left) were parodied in the Merrie Melodies film The Dover Boys at Pimento University (right).

Some genre theorists, following Bakhtin, see parody as a natural development in the life cycle of any genre; this idea has proven especially fruitful for genre film theorists. Such theorists note that Western movies, for example, after the classic stage defined the conventions of the genre, underwent a parody stage, in which those same conventions were ridiculed and critiqued. Because audiences had seen these classic Westerns, they had expectations for any new Westerns, and when these expectations were inverted, the audience laughed.

An early parody film was the 1922 movie Mud and Sand, a Stan Laurel film that made fun of Rudolph Valentino's film Blood and Sand. Laurel specialized in parodies in the mid-1920s, writing and acting in a number of them. Some were send-ups of popular films, such as Dr. Jekyll and Mr. Hyde—parodied in the comic Dr. Pyckle and Mr. Pryde (1926). Others were spoofs of Broadway plays, such as No, No, Nanette (1925), parodied as Yes, Yes, Nanette (1925). In 1940 Charlie Chaplin created a satirical comedy about Adolf Hitler with the film The Great Dictator, following the first-ever Hollywood parody of the Nazis, the Three Stooges' short subject You Nazty Spy!.

About 20 years later Mel Brooks started his career with a Hitler parody as well. After his 1967 film The Producers won both an Academy Award and a Writers Guild of America Award for Best Original Screenplay, Brooks became one of the most famous film parodists and created spoofs in multiple film genres. Blazing Saddles (1974) is a parody of western films, History of the World, Part I (1981) is a historical parody, Robin Hood Men in Tights (1993) is Brooks' take on the classic Robin Hood tale, and his spoofs in the horror, sci-fi and adventure genres include Young Frankenstein (1974), and Spaceballs (1987, a Star Wars spoof).

The British comedy group Monty Python is also famous for its parodies, for example, the King Arthur spoof Monty Python and the Holy Grail (1974), and the religious satire Life of Brian (1979). In the 1980s the team of David Zucker, Jim Abrahams and Jerry Zucker parodied well-established genres such as disaster, war and police movies with the Airplane!, Hot Shots! and Naked Gun series respectively. There is a 1989 film parody from Spain of the TV series The A-Team called El equipo Aahhgg directed by José Truchado.

More recently, parodies have taken on whole film genres at once. One of the first was Don't Be a Menace to South Central While Drinking Your Juice in the Hood and the Scary Movie franchise. Other recent genre parodies include Shriek If You Know What I Did Last Friday the 13th, Not Another Teen Movie, Date Movie, Epic Movie, Meet the Spartans, Superhero Movie, Disaster Movie, Vampires Suck, and The 41-Year-Old Virgin Who Knocked Up Sarah Marshall and Felt Superbad About It, all of which have been critically panned.

=== Copyright ===
Many parody films have as their target out-of-copyright or non-copyrighted subjects (such as Frankenstein or Robin Hood) whilst others settle for imitation which does not infringe copyright, but is clearly aimed at a popular (and usually lucrative) subject. The spy film craze of the 1960s, fuelled by the popularity of James Bond is such an example. In this genre a rare, and possibly unique, example of a parody film taking aim at a non-comedic subject over which it actually holds copyright is the 1967 James Bond spoof Casino Royale. In this case, producer Charles K. Feldman initially intended to make a serious film, but decided that it would not be able to compete with the established series of Bond films. Hence, he decided to parody the series.

== Poetic parodies ==
Kenneth Baker considered poetic parody to take five main forms.

1. The first was to use parody to attack the author parodied, as in J K Stephen's mimicry of Wordsworth, "Two voices are there: one is of the deep....And one is of an old half-witted sheep."
2. The second was to pastiche the author's style, as with Henry Reed's parody of T. S. Eliot, Chard Whitlow: "As we get older we do not get any younger...."
3. The third type reversed (and so undercut) the sentiments of the poem parodied, as with Monty Python's All Things Dull and Ugly.
4. A fourth approach was to use the target poem as a matrix for inserting unrelated (generally humorous) material – "To have it out or not? That is the question....Thus dentists do make cowards of us all."
5. Finally, parody may be used to attack contemporary/topical targets by utilizing the format of a well-known piece of verse: "O Rushdie, Rushdie, it's a vile world" (Cat Stevens).

A further, more constructive form of poetic parody is one that links the contemporary poet with past forms and past masters through affectionate parodying – thus sharing poetic codes while avoiding some of the anxiety of influence.

More aggressive in tone are playground poetry parodies, often attacking authority, values and culture itself in a carnivalesque rebellion: "Twinkle, Twinkle little star,/ Who the hell do you think you are?"

== Self-parody ==
A subset of parody is self-parody in which artists parody their own work (as in Ricky Gervais's Extras).

== Copyright issues and other legal issues ==
Although a parody can be considered a derivative work of a pre-existing, copyrighted work, some countries have ruled that parodies can fall under copyright limitations such as fair dealing, or otherwise have fair dealing laws that include parody in their scope.

=== United States ===
Parodies are protected under the fair use doctrine of United States copyright law, but the defense is more successful if the usage of an existing copyrighted work is transformative in nature, such as being a critique or commentary upon it.

In Campbell v. Acuff-Rose Music, Inc., the Supreme Court ruled that a rap parody of "Oh, Pretty Woman" by 2 Live Crew was fair use, as the parody was a distinctive, transformative work designed to ridicule the original song, and that "even if 2 Live Crew's copying of the original's first line of lyrics and characteristic opening bass riff may be said to go to the original's 'heart,' that heart is what most readily conjures up the song for parody, and it is the heart at which parody takes aim."

In 2001, the Eleventh Circuit Court of Appeals, in Suntrust v. Houghton Mifflin, upheld the right of Alice Randall to publish a parody of Gone with the Wind called The Wind Done Gone, which told the same story from the point of view of Scarlett O'Hara's slaves, who were glad to be rid of her.

In 2007, the Ninth Circuit Court of Appeals denied a fair use defense in the Dr. Seuss Enterprises v. Penguin Books case. Citing the Campbell v. Acuff-Rose decision, they found that a satire of the O.J. Simpson murder trial and parody of The Cat in the Hat had infringed upon the children's book because it did not provide a commentary function upon that work.

=== Canada ===
Under Canadian law, although there is protection for Fair Dealing, there is no explicit protection for parody and satire. In Canwest v. Horizon, the publisher of the Vancouver Sun launched a lawsuit against a group which had published a pro-Palestinian parody of the paper. Alan Donaldson, the judge in the case, ruled that parody is not a defence to a copyright claim.

As of the implementation of the Copyright Modernization Act 2012, "Fair dealing for the purpose of research, private study, education, parody or satire does not infringe copyright."

=== United Kingdom ===
In 2006 the Gowers Review of Intellectual Property recommended that the UK should "create an exception to copyright for the purpose of caricature, parody or pastiche by 2008". Following the first stage of a two-part public consultation, the Intellectual Property Office reported that the information received "was not sufficient to persuade us that the advantages of a new parody exception were sufficient to override the disadvantages to the creators and owners of the underlying work. There is therefore no proposal to change the current approach to parody, caricature and pastiche in the UK."

However, following the Hargreaves Review in May 2011 (which made similar proposals to the Gowers Review) the Government broadly accepted these proposals. The current law (effective from 1 October 2014), namely Section 30A of the Copyright, Designs and Patents Act 1988, now provides an exception to infringement where there is fair dealing of the original work for the purpose of parody (or alternatively for the purpose of caricature or pastiche). The legislation does not define what is meant by "parody", but the UK IPO – the Intellectual Property Office (United Kingdom) – suggests that a "parody" is something that imitates a work for humorous or satirical effect. See also Fair dealing in United Kingdom law.

=== Other ===
Some countries do not like parodies and the parodies can even be considered insulting. The person who makes the parody can be fined or even jailed. For instance in the UAE and North Korea, parodies are not allowed.

== Internet culture ==
A cartoon from Cold Ones Clips shows grotesque versions of Scooby-Doo, Where Are You! characters participating in tax evasion and being brutally killed by a character from Breaking Bad.

Parody is a prominent genre in online culture, thanks in part to the ease with which digital texts may be altered, appropriated, and shared. Japanese kuso and Chinese e'gao are emblematic of the importance of parody in online cultures in Asia. Video mash-ups and other parodic memes, such as humorously altered Chinese characters, have been particularly popular as a tool for political protest in the People's Republic of China, the government of which maintains an extensive censorship apparatus. Chinese internet slang makes extensive use of puns and parodies on how Chinese characters are pronounced or written, as illustrated in the Grass-Mud Horse Lexicon.

=== Computer-generated parodies ===
Parody generators are computer programs which generate text that is syntactically correct, but usually meaningless, often in the style of a technical paper or a particular writer. They are also called travesty generators and random text generators.

Their purpose is often satirical, intending to show that there is little difference between the generated text and real examples.

Many work by using techniques such as Markov chains to reprocess real text examples; alternatively, they may be hand-coded. Generated texts can vary from essay length to paragraphs and tweets. (The term "quote generator" can also be used for software that randomly selects real quotations.)

== Social and political uses ==
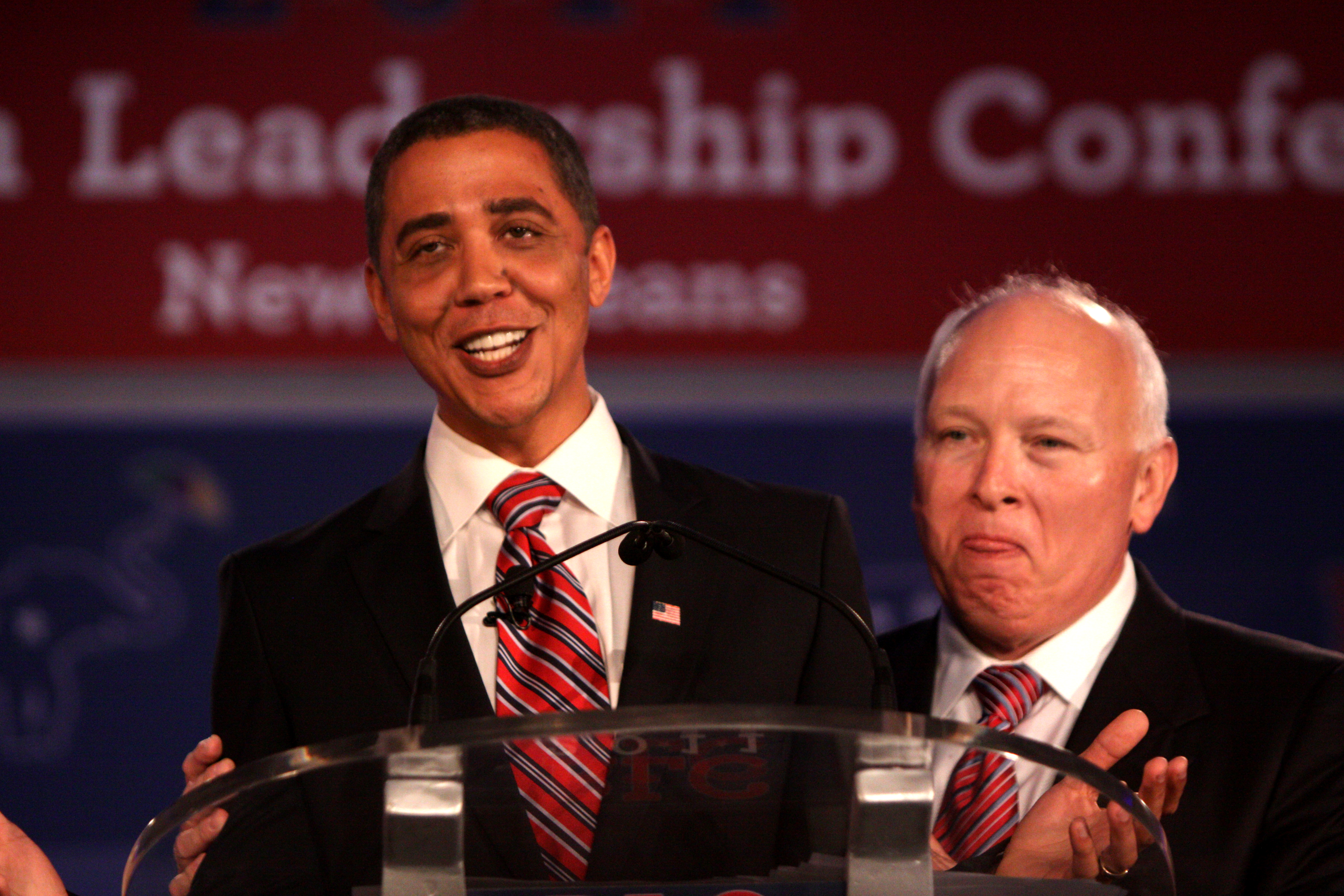
Reggie Brown, a voice actor and Barack Obama impersonator

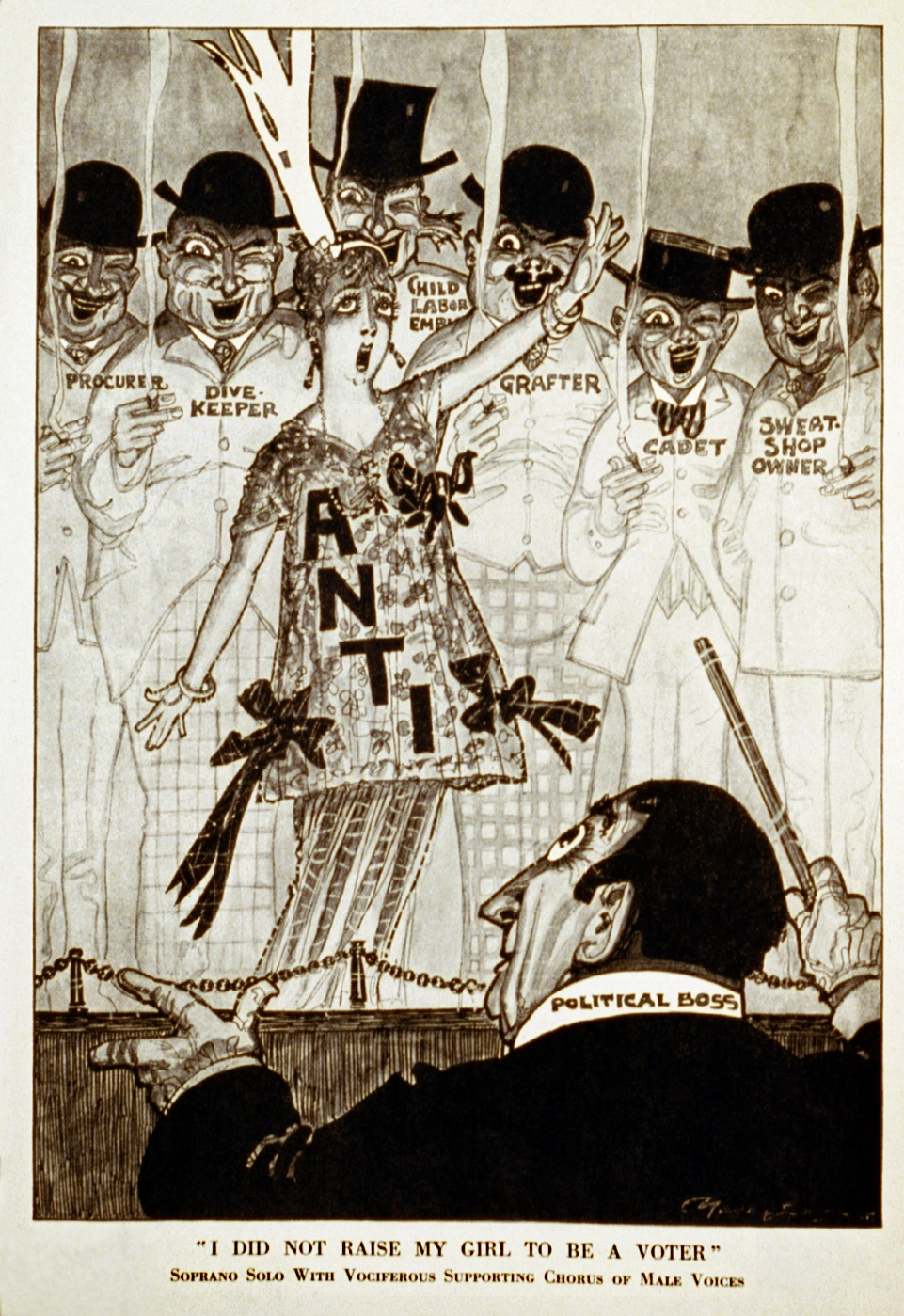
Satirical political cartoon that appeared in Puck magazine, October 9, 1915. Caption "I did not raise my girl to be a voter" parodies the anti-World War I song "I Didn't Raise My Boy To Be A Soldier". A chorus of disreputable men support a lone anti-suffrage woman.

Parody is often used to make a social or political statement. Examples include Swift's "A Modest Proposal", which satirized English neglect of Ireland by parodying emotionally disengaged political tracts; and, recently, The Daily Show, The Larry Sanders Show and The Colbert Report, which parody a news broadcast and a talk show to satirize political and social trends and events.

On the other hand, the writer and frequent parodist Vladimir Nabokov made a distinction: "Satire is a lesson, parody is a game."

The use of parody on shows like Saturday Night Live (SNL) can reshape how people view political figures and even the media itself. SNL tends to exaggerate certain traits of politicians, making jokes that allow the viewers to compare this to the real thing. Using this type of humor also makes the audience pay closer attention to the conflicts in the entertainment rather than the more serious political issues. Parody encourages viewers to see the political communication more tediously than they might have before.

Some events, such as a national tragedy, can be difficult to handle. Chet Clem, Editorial Manager of the news parody publication The Onion, told Wikinews in an interview the questions that are raised when addressing difficult topics:

I know the September 11 issue was an obviously very large challenge to approach. Do we even put out an issue? What is funny at this time in American history? Where are the jokes? Do people want jokes right now? Is the nation ready to laugh again? Who knows. There will always be some level of division in the back room. It's also what keeps us on our toes.

Parody is by no means necessarily satirical, and may sometimes be done with respect and appreciation of the subject involved, without being a heedless sarcastic attack.

Parody has also been used to facilitate dialogue between cultures or subcultures. Sociolinguist Mary Louise Pratt identifies parody as one of the "arts of the contact zone", through which marginalized or oppressed groups "selectively appropriate", or imitate and take over, aspects of more empowered cultures.

Shakespeare often uses a series of parodies to convey his meaning. In the social context of his era, an example can be seen in King Lear where the fool is introduced with his coxcomb to be a parody of the king.

== Examples ==
=== Historic examples ===
- Sir Thopas in Canterbury Tales, by Geoffrey Chaucer
- Morgante by Luigi Pulci
- The Nymph's Reply to the Shepherd by Sir Walter Raleigh
- La secchia rapita by Alessandro Tassoni
- Don Quixote by Miguel de Cervantes
- Beware the Cat by William Baldwin
- The Knight of the Burning Pestle by Francis Beaumont and John Fletcher
- Dragon of Wantley, an anonymous 17th century ballad
- Hudibras by Samuel Butler
- "MacFlecknoe", by John Dryden
- A Tale of a Tub by Jonathan Swift
- The Rape of the Lock by Alexander Pope
- Namby Pamby by Henry Carey
- Northanger Abbey by Jane Austen
- Gulliver's Travels by Jonathan Swift
- The Dunciad by Alexander Pope
- Memoirs of Martinus Scriblerus by John Gay, Alexander Pope, John Arbuthnot, et al.
- Mozart's A Musical Joke (Ein musikalischer Spaß), K.522 (1787) – parody of incompetent contemporaries of Mozart, as assumed by some theorists
- Sartor Resartus by Thomas Carlyle
- Ways and Means, or The aged, aged man, by Lewis Carroll. Much of Alice in Wonderland and Through the Looking-Glass is parodic of Victorian schooling.
- Batrachomyomachia (battle between frogs and mice), an Iliad parody by an unknown ancient Greek author
- A Century of Parody and Imitation by Walter Jerrold and R. Maynard Leonard

=== Internet examples ===
- Punt nua, a parody currency and internet meme (2011)
- "After Ever After" a capella series by YouTube personality Jon Cozart, parody of various Disney songs
- SMG4, a sketch comedy machinima and parody web series of Super Mario Bros., various video games, and pop culture

=== Modern television examples ===
- Saturday Night Live parodies of Sarah Palin
- Saturday Night Live parodies of Donald Trump
- Square One TV parodies of Dragnet
- Southpaw Regional Wrestling, WWE's parody of 80s territory-style professional wrestling
- On Cinema and spin-off Decker parody film review shows and political action thrillers, respectively.
- "Handyman Corner" and "Handyman Tip" segments on The Red Green Show by Steve Smith and Rick Green, parodying home improvement and do-it-yourself shows
- The "Get the Belt" sketch on A Black Lady Sketch Show parodies the genre of dance movies like Step Up and Save the Last Dance.
- Yonderland, parody of the medieval European fantasy genre.

=== Anime and manga ===
- The 100 Girlfriends Who Really, Really, Really, Really, Really Love You, parody of the harem genre
- Attack on Titan: Junior High and Spoof on Titan, official parodies of the Attack on Titan series
- Bobobo-bo Bo-bobo, parody of shōnen manga
- Cromartie High School, parody of the yankī genre
- Detroit Metal City, parody of the death metal scene and the music industry
- Excel Saga, parody of various anime genres and tropes
- Gintama, parody of shōnen manga and Japanese pop culture
- KonoSuba, parody of the isekai genre
- Monthly Girls' Nozaki-kun, parody of shōjo manga
- Mr. Osomatsu, parody of modern Japanese society and anime clichés
- One-Punch Man, parody of the superhero genre
- Pani Poni, parody of school-life anime and pop culture
- Panty & Stocking with Garterbelt, parody of American cartoons and magical girl tropes
- Pop Team Epic, parody of otaku culture, anime conventions, and internet memes

=== Western animation ===
- Animaniacs – parody of Hollywood, history, and pop culture
- BoJack Horseman – parody of Hollywood and celebrity culture
- Drawn Together – parody of reality TV and animation archetypes
- Family Guy – parody of films, celebrities, and other TV shows
- Futurama – parody of science fiction and futurism tropes
- Looney Tunes and Merrie Melodies – parody of fairy tales, Hollywood, and popular culture
- The Rocky and Bullwinkle Show – parody of Cold War politics, serialized dramas, and advertising
- Robot Chicken – parody of films, cartoons, video games, and toys
- Rick and Morty – parody of science fiction, especially Back to the Future and multiverse concepts
- South Park – parody of politics, celebrities, and current events
- The Simpsons – parody of American family life and popular culture

== See also ==
- Abridgement
- Anti-Barney humor
- Détournement
- Internet meme
- Intertextuality
- Joke
- Literary technique
- Metaparody
- Parody advertisement
- Parody in popular music
- Parody film
- Parody music
- Parody religion
- Parody science
- Persiflage
- P. D. Q. Bach
- Satire
- Subvertising
- Tom Lehrer
- "Weird Al" Yankovic
