= Dr. Seuss Enters., L.P. v. Penguin Books USA, Inc. =

US lawsuit

- Court: United States Court of Appeals for the Ninth Circuit
- Full case name: Dr. Seuss Enterprises, L.P. v. Penguin Books USA, Inc., Dove Audio Inc.
- Argued: October 10, 1996
- Decided: March 27, 1997
- Citation: 109 F.3d 1394

Case history
- Prior history: Dr. Seuss Enters., L.P. v. Penguin Book USA, Inc.924 F. Supp. 1559 (1996) Penguin Books USA v. Dr. Seuss Enters., L.P. 521 U.S. 1146 (1997)

Holding
- affirmed order granting plaintiff's preliminary injunction.

Court membership
- Judges sitting: Diarmuid F. O'Scannlain, Thomas G. Nelson, Michael Daly Hawkins

Laws applied
- Lanham Act 15 U.S.C.S. § 1125(a)

Dr. Seuss Enters., L.P. v. Penguin Books USA, Inc. 109 F.3d 1394 (9th Cir. 1997) was a copyright lawsuit where the court determined if a copy of an original work's artistic style, plot, themes, and certain key character elements qualified as fair use. Penguin Books published a book titled The Cat NOT in the Hat! A Parody by Dr. Juice that use the artistic style, themes and characteristics of Dr. Seuss books to tell the story of the O. J. Simpson murder case. Dr. Seuss Enterprises accused the publisher of copyright and trademark infringement.

== Background ==
Dr. Seuss Enterprises owns the trademarks and copyrights author Dr. Seuss' publications. Dr. Seuss authored and published 47 books that are widely distributed and contains characteristics such as simple rhyming and repetitive language, with characters that are recognizable to children. This includes the book The Cat in the Hat, first published in 1957 with the main character being "the Cat" who wears a red and white striped stovepipe hat, which Seuss owns the trademark to. Dr. Seuss also owns copyright registrations for several books containing the Cat.

Alan Katz and Chris Wrinn wrote and illustrated The Cat NOT in the Hat! A Parody by Dr. Juice satirizing the O. J. Simpson murder case in the style of Dr. Seuss' publications. Penguin Books USA, Inc. and Dove Audio, Inc., publishers of the work, were not licensed or authorized to use the work from Dr. Seuss and did not request permission. Dr. Seuss Enterprises filed a complaint for copyright and trademark infringement, an application for a temporary restraining order and a preliminary injunction, after seeing advertising promoting the satirical work.

In the complaint Seuss alleged that Katz and Wrinn misappropriated substantial protected elements of its copyrighted works and violations of the Copyright Code, 17 U.S.C. §§ 501-02; the Federal Trademark Dilution Act of 1995, 15 U.S.C. § 1125(c)(1); the Lanham Act, 15 U.S.C. § 1125(a); and the California Unfair Competition Statute, § 17200 et seq. and § 14330. The district court denied the temporary restraining order and set the preliminary injunction for trial. Seuss incorporated infringement claims for publications Horton Hatches the Egg and One Fish Two Fish Red Fish Blue Fish in the request for injunctive relief, which was granted on March 21, 1996.

Penguin and Dove printed 12,000 books of the satirical work at the cost of $35,500, which the court refrained from being distributed. Penguin and Dove filed a motion for reconsideration, which cause the court to modify the order but failed to dissolve the preliminary injunction. The court found that defendants took substantial protected expression from The Cat in the Hat but not from Horton or One Fish Two Fish, a strong likelihood on success on the parody as fair use issue, serious questions for litigation and a balance of hardships favoring Seuss on the trademark violations, a strong likelihood that a copyright claim raising a presumption of irreparable harm, and a low success on the federal dilution claim.

Penguin and Dove appealed the district court's decision of a preliminary injunction prohibiting the distribution of The Cat NOT in the Hat! A Parody by Dr. Juice.

== Opinion of the Court ==
Judge Diarmuid F. O'Scannlain wrote the majority opinion where the court affirmed the preliminary injunction against Penguin Books.

For proving a case of copyright infringement Seuss proved that he held a valid copyright to The Cat in the Hat by owning copyright registration certificates and demonstrated substantial similarity in a two-part test where a subjective and objective analysis of expression was performed. The court determined that substantial similarity exists where the Cat was a central character to Seuss’ work, Alan Katz admitting that the illustrations were inspired by the cat, and Penguin appropriated the Cat's image, copying the hat and using the image 13 times.

The court addressed Penguin's fair use defense under parody by analyzing the four factor test in 17 U.S.C. § 107 and concluded that the District Court's ruling against fair use was not erroneous. For the first factor analyzing the purpose and commercial use of the work, the court determined it to be against fair use based on the commercial use of the work and that the work merely mimics the characteristic style of Dr. Seuss, it does not hold the style up to ridicule and there was no effort to create transformative work. For the second factor analyzing the nature of the work, the court determined it to be against fair use due to the use of the Cat, the central character in Seuss’ work. For the third factor looking at the amount and substantiality of the portion of the work used, the court determined, the court sided with the district court decision against fair use, because Penguin appropriated the cat's character a central character in Seuss’ work. For the fourth factor analyzing the effect on the commercial market, the court ruled against fair use concluding that Penguin's work can be considered market substitution and citing Penguin's failure of bringing forth relevant markets.

For the trademark infringement, the court examined the likelihood of confusion in the market place and sided with the district court, based on proximity and similarities between infringement items such as the Cat's hat, the narrator name, the title.
