= William Thomson (musicologist) =

Scottish folk song collector and singer

William Thomson (fl. 1695–1753) was a Scottish folk song collector and singer.

He is said to have been the son of Daniel Thomson, one of the king's trumpeters for Scotland. As a boy singer, he sang at a concert – The Feast of St. Cecillia – in 1695. Before 1722, he had settled in London, and according to Charles Burney had a benefit concert that year. He appears to have become a fashionable singer, as his volume, dedicated to Caroline of Ansbach, Princess of Wales, contains a lengthy list of notable persons as subscribers.

He was the editor of the first collection of Scottish folk songs published together with their melodies. This is a folio named Orpheus Caledonius, a collection of the best Scotch songs set to Musick, entered at Stationers' Hall on 5 January 1725. The book consists of 50 songs with their airs, along with a simple accompaniment. A second volume, in two volumes octavo, had another 50 added.

The two editions are interesting and valuable, although Sir John Hawkins described him as "a tradesman" and said that his collection was injudicious and incorrect. The words of the songs were largely taken from Allan Ramsay's Tea-Table Miscellany, published in 1724.
