= Sonome =

Japanese poet

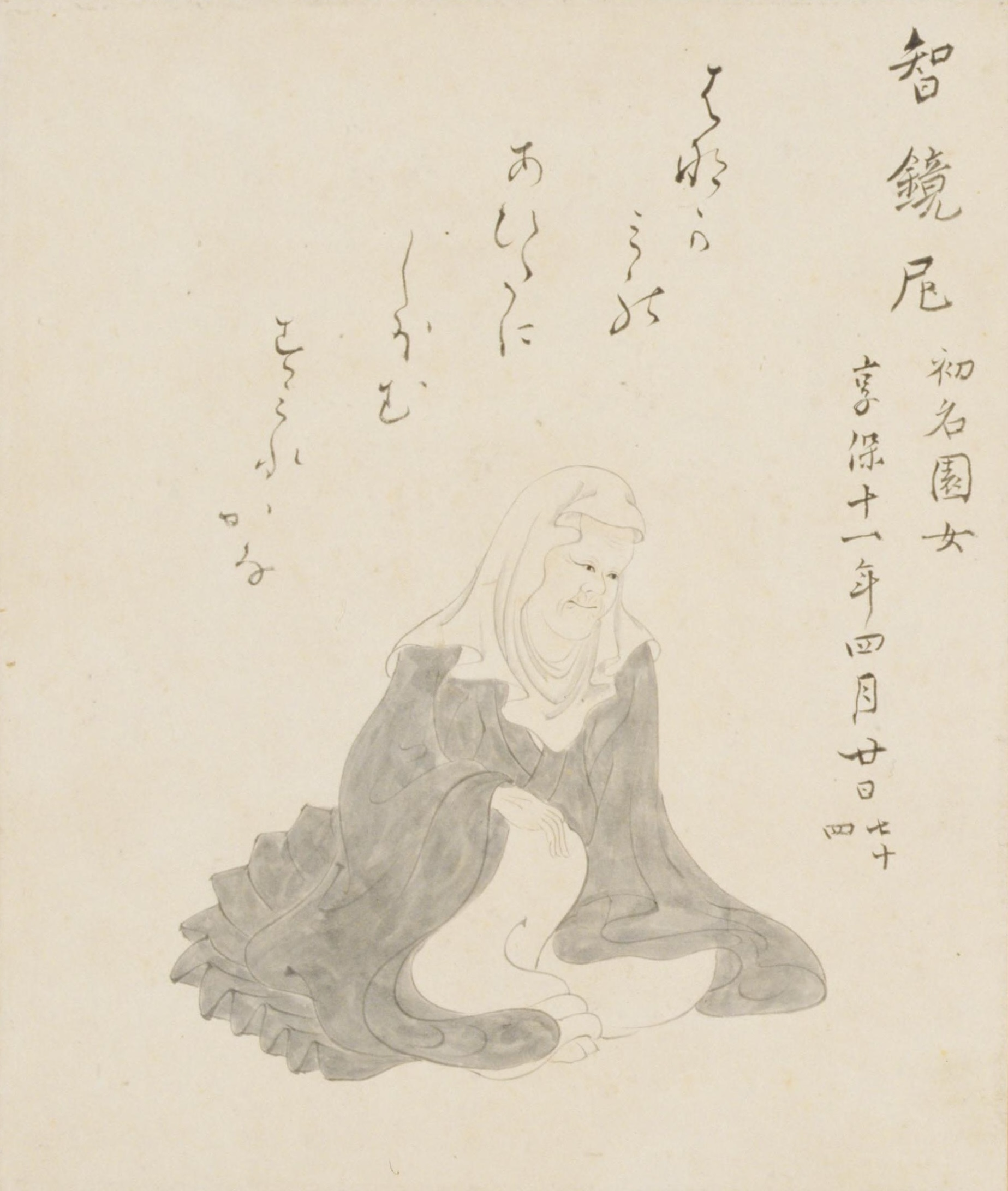
portrait by Kurihara Nobumitsu

Shiba Sonome (1664–1726, 斯波 園女) was a Japanese zen poet. She was an acquaintance and friend of Matsuo Bashō, and their correspondence is a treasure of zen and haiku history. On a final visit in 1694, Bashō paid homage to her in a haiku, hiragiku no me ni tatete miru chiri mo nashi, 白菊の目に立てゝ見る塵もなし, in the eye of a white chrysanthemum, there is not a speck of dust.

Sonome was known for the purity of her spirit and her poetry, which possessed a frank and immediate sense of purpose. Her published works include, Kiku no Chiri, 菊の塵, Dust on Chrysanthemums.
