= Henry Carey (writer) =

English poet, dramatist and songwriter

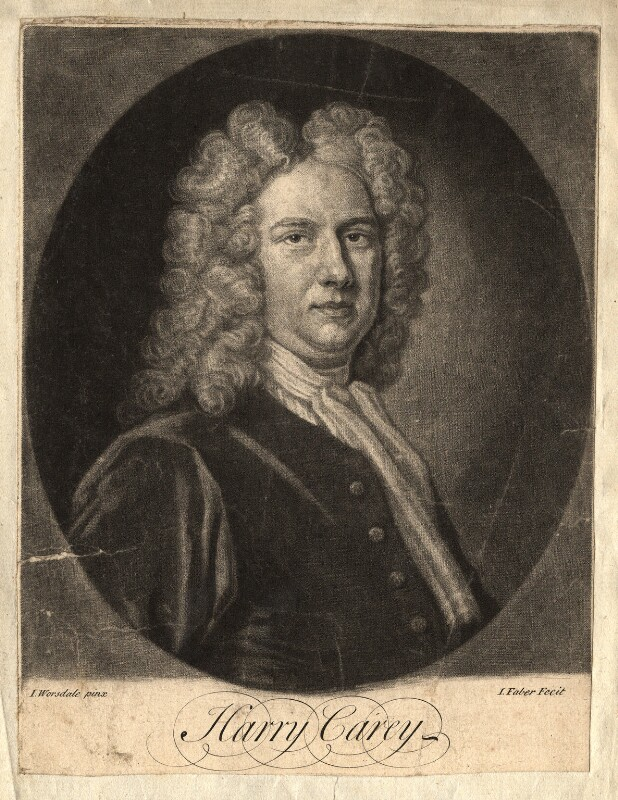
Henry Carey, by John Faber the Younger 1729

Henry Carey (c. 26 August 1687 – 5 October 1743) was an English poet, dramatist and composer. He is remembered as an anti-Walpolean satirist and also as a patriot. Several of his melodies continue to be sung today, and he was widely praised in the generation after his death. Because he worked in anonymity, selling his own compositions to others to pass off as their own, contemporary scholarship can only be certain of some of his poetry, and a great deal of the music he composed was written for theatrical incidental music. However, under his own name and hand, he was a prolific songwriter and balladeer, and he wrote the lyrics for almost all of these songs. Further, he wrote numerous operas and plays. His life is illustrative of the professional author in the early 18th century. Without inheritance or title or governmental position, he wrote for all of the remunerative venues, and yet he also kept his own political point of view and was able to score significant points against the ministry of the day. Further, he was one of the leading lights of the new "Patriotic" movement in drama.

Carey is famous for his satirical play Chrononhotonthologos.

== Early life ==
Henry Carey was born in London and was the illegitimate son of George Savile, 1st Marquess of Halifax. Carey did not make the claim himself, but he did use "Savile" as the name of three of his male children, and these corresponded to the births of Halifax's own three sons. Furthermore, he dedicated all of his major works to Halifax (Gillespie 127). His biography in The Gentleman's Magazine also stated that Carey received a "generous annuity" from the Savile family, but that seems less likely and remains unconfirmed. The fact that, even when his most popular plays were on the boards, Carey would write for pay argues against such an annuity.

Aside from rumor, it is impossible to be sure of Carey's parents. It is possible that a Henry and a Mary Carey, both school teachers, were his parents. Indeed, his first profession, according to Richard Hawkins, was as a music teacher in a boarding school for the middle gentry, a position he held while also working as an author, so these two Careys are the most likely candidates for at least his surrogate, if not his biological, parents.

== Early musical and literary work ==
Scholars have trouble identifying Carey's first works, because he was probably writing anonymously. According to Laetitia Pilkington, friend of Jonathan Swift's and other Tory wits, Carey worked as a "subaltern" to James Worsdale later in his life, in 1734, when he was best paid and most famous. Since he was writing for pay when he had theatrical successes, it seems reasonable that he had been hiring his pen for quite some time. In the 18th century, he did hack work for the periodicals of the day. His first accredited work was a weekly publication of a serialized romance fictions entitled Records of Love in January through March 1710. This work was aimed at a female readership and was written with a clear expectation of an intelligent, educated, and populous set of readers. He also appears as a singer of Italian and English entre-acte songs at Theatre Royal, Drury Lane around 1710 (Gillespie 127). His first poetry publication came in 1713, the year of the height of the Tory ministry under Queen Anne with Poems on Several Occasions.

In 1714, Carey had a job as a psalmist at Lincoln's Inn church and also at Drury Lane. He performed there with his music students. The Tory ministry fell with the death of Anne, and Robert Walpole's Whigs were on the rise. The leaders of the former government, Robert Harley and Henry St. John, were accused of treason over the coming months, and, while St. John fled, Harley was imprisoned in the Tower of London. In 1715, Carey wrote his first play, an afterpiece entitled The Contrivances. On 13 July 1717, Carey lost both of his posts, at Drury Lane and at Lincoln's Inn, for a singular political statement: Harley had just been freed from the Tower and had attended Lincoln's Inn Church, and Carey set Psalm 124 to a jaunty, celebratory tune and sang it. The Psalm concerns the Exodus of the Israelites, announcing that

"If it had not been the Lord who was on our side, when men rose up against us:
Then they had swallowed us up quick, when their wrath was kindled against us:
Then the waters had overwhelmed us, the stream had gone over our soul."

It concludes with "Our soul is escaped as a bird out of the snare of the fowlers: the snare is broken, and we are escaped."

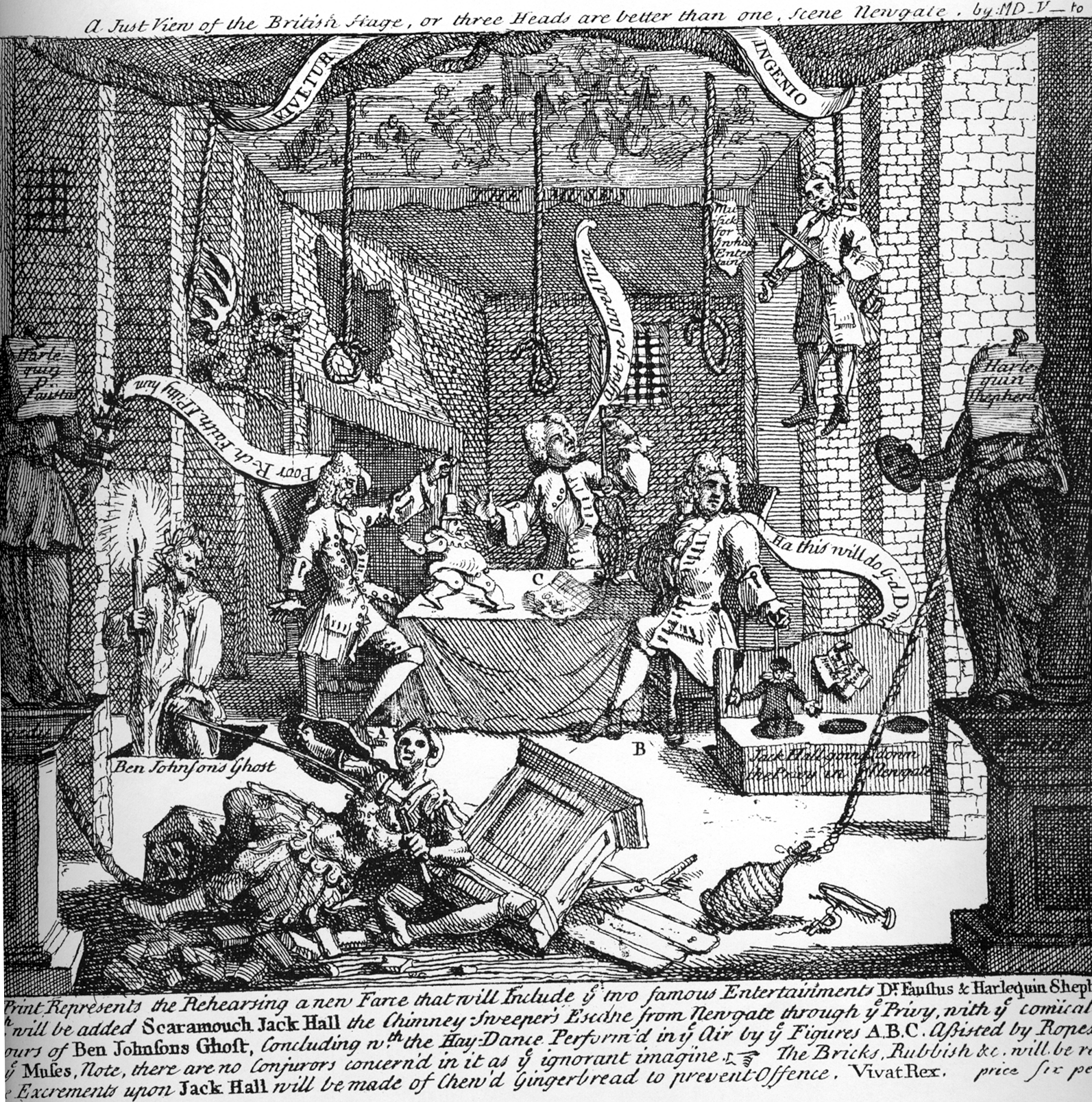
William Hogarth's satire of pantomime and puppet theatricals, 1724.

Even though Carey lost those two positions, he was soon back at Drury Lane, and he married Elizabeth Pearks in September. He produced his second play, Hanging and Marriage, in 1722. The theatrical seasons of 1723 and 1724 were dominated by pantomime and spectacle plays in London (inducing a young William Hogarth to satirize the abandonment of drama for puppets), and Carey provided the music to some of these productions. In 1723, he wrote the music for Harlequin Dr. Faustus (text, such as it was, by Barton Booth) at Drury Lane. From 1723 to 1733, Carey was the "unofficial composer in residence" for Drury Lane, and he wrote and performed much of the music between acts, preludes, and epilogue music, as well as the music called for by dances and other entertainments in the plays (Gillespie 127).

Henry Carey never ceased to be a composer nor to work as a singer and musician. Even as he began to have greater success as a poet and playwright, he continued to work in music. He worked in a theatre that was associated with the Whig party. Colley Cibber, Robert Wilks, and Barton Booth were patronized first by Joseph Addison and his circle and then by Robert Walpole and his circle, and yet Carey appears to have been an unambiguous supporter of the Tory ministry of Henry St. John and Harley and the literary circle of Alexander Pope. When, therefore, Pope satirized the theatrical vacuity of the pantomime stage in The Dunciad, he was aiming not at the musicians and composers, but rather at the replacement of drama with spectacle.

== Namby Pamby and anti-Walpolean satire ==
Of all the girls that are so smart
There's none like pretty Sally;
She is the darling of my heart,
And she lives in our alley.
There is no lady in the land
Is half so sweet as Sally;
She is the darling of my heart,
And she lives in our alley.

Of all the days that's in the week
I dearly love but one day,
And that's the day that comes betwixt
The Saturday and Monday;
For then I'm drest all in my best
To walk abroad with Sally;
She is the darling of my heart,
And she lives in our alley.

When Christmas comes about again,
O, then I shall have money!
I'll hoard it up, and, box and all,
I'll give it to my honey;
O, would it were ten thousand pound!
I'd give it all to Sally;
For she's the darling of my heart,
And she lives in our alley.

My master and the neighbors all
Make game of me and Sally,
And but for her I'd better be
A slave, and row a galley;
But when my seven long years are out,
O, then I'll marry Sally!
O, then we'll wed, and then we'll bed, -
But not in our alley!

— From the "Sally In Our Alley" poem by Henry Carey

His poem, Namby Pamby (1725), satirized Ambrose Philips, a frequent and famous target of Alexander Pope's wrath. Philips had written a series of odes to "all persons", from Robert Walpole to the mother in the nursery, and the latter provided the occasion for Carey to exaggerate. Philips had employed a 2.5' iambic line, and Carey devastatingly claimed that the half-line matched Philips's halfwitted conception. The poem was so successful that Carey himself began to be known as "Namby Pamby Carey" (while Philips became known as "Namby Pamby"), and the poem even came to be used as children's literature. Furthermore, the term "namby pamby" came into widespread usage to describe any nonsensical frippery. "Sally in Our Alley", one of Carey's songs, was also exceptionally successful, and it has been performed by many singers through to the modern era.

Carey was, after Namby Pamby, a well-known figure among those opposed to Robert Walpole, and the poem had been praised by Alexander Pope (as "Sally in our Alley" had been by Joseph Addison). Carey was an admirer and subscriber to the operas of Handel, but, like John Gay and Alexander Pope, thought that the operatic stars were absurd. Therefore, he began to satirize opera in 1726 and in that year he produced Faustina, or, the Roman Songstress, a satire of Faustina Bordoni. Faustina was at that time in a hissing fight with Francesca Cuzzoni and actually came to blows the next year during a performance of Handel. In the next year, he wrote Mocking is Catching to satirize Senesino, the Italian castrati opera star.

In 1730, he added music and introduced ballads for his previous play, Hanging and Marriage, and put the play on as The Clown's Stratagem. He used the basic text of the play again, with new music, for Betty, or, The Country Bumpkins in 1732. These two characteristics—a love of opera and frustration at its abuses and a love of patriotism and frustration at Walpole's policies—would show up in all of Carey's professional works.

In the same year, Carey may have been the first to sing "God Save the King" at a Patriot Whig meeting, and there is some reason to attribute the song to him. The Bath Chronicle of 13 August 1795 recounted:

The uncertainty concerning the author of the words and music of "God save the King", has been removed by the testimony of Mr. [John Christopher] Smith, of Bath, who says that Mr. Henry Carey... came to him with the words and melody of the song in question, desiring him to correct the bass, which Mr. Smith told him was not proper; and at Mr. Carey’s request, Mr. Smith wrote down another in correct harmony.

The earliest published version of God Save the King (for two voices) seems to date from the early 1740s.

== Carey as dramatic satirist ==
An 1818 playbill for Chrononhotonthologos.

As a playwright, Carey was a significant figure in the re-emergence of satirical drama in the 1730s. After the success of Namby Pamby, Carey was favored by the older generation of Tory wits and the Scriblerus Club. After John Gay's invention of the ballad opera with The Beggar's Opera, Carey turned to writing musical burlesques. He wrote a great deal of music and some librettos for other playwrights during this period.

In 1732, John Frederick Lampe, Thomas Arne, John Christopher Smith and Henry Carey formed the English Opera project. Their goal was to revive serious opera in English. Together, they formed the English Opera Company, and Carey wrote two librettos, for Amelia (set by Lampe and acted at the Little Theatre at The Haymarket (an opposition playhouse favored by Henry Fielding)) and Teraminta (set by Smith and performed at Lincoln's Inn Fields). Amelia was a great popular success, but the opera company failed, and the project came to nought (Gillespie 128).

Having satirized the foreignness of opera, in 1734 Carey turned his attention to the poorly written, mass-produced tragedy. Chrononhotonthologos was a parody of bombastic tragedy and, particularly, the very hack-written spectacle plays he had collaborated on at Drury Lane. The play was daring, for it was a satire of Caroline of Ansbach and George II of Great Britain. The Queen was attacked for her alliance with Robert Walpole and her general caprice. It also had a generous amount of music by Carey. If contemporary allies understood the criticisms inherent in the play, it was also possible to see it as a burlesque with nonsense verse. He followed that up with the ballad farce of The Honest Yorkshire-Man.

Although Carey's attempt to revive serious, patriotic English opera did not work, his attempts at parody and satire in opera did. He had previously satirized the exoticism and emptiness of the English public's love of prima donna singers and castrati, but in 1737, he adapted The Dragon of Wantley from a Lincolnshire folk ballad into a full mock-opera. This literary adaptation was a step beyond adapting literary plays into ballads (as John Gay had done), for it began with a folk ballad and transformed it into opera. The play, with music by John Frederick Lampe, punctured the vacuous operatic conventions and pointed a satirical barb at Robert Walpole and his taxation policies. The play was a huge success. Its initial run was sixty-nine performances in the first season, which exceeded even The Beggar's Opera. The play debuted at the Haymarket, where its coded attack on Walpole would have been clear, but its long run occurred after it moved to Covent Garden, which had a much greater capacity for staging. Part of its satire of opera was that it had all of the words sung, including the recitatives and da capo arias (Gillespie 128). The play itself is very brief on the page, as it relied extensively on absurd theatrics, dances, and other non-textual entertainments. The Musical Entertainer from 1739 contains engravings showing how the staging was performed (Gillespie 128).

From 1737 to 1740, he wrote The Musical Century in one Hundred English Ballads in two volumes. Although Carey complained that his enemies were calling him "Ballad-maker," the work was praised later by Charles Burney, and in the 19th century opinion of Carey's clear, simple, and memorable ballad tunes went even higher. Also in 1738, he helped found the Fund for Decayed Musicians, and he produced Margery, or, a Worse Plague than the Dragon, a sequel to The Dragon of Wantley.

He had another popular success in 1739 with Nancy, or, The Parting Lovers, a patriotic play about a sailor leaving his beloved to fight against the Spanish. As with other works, Carey's point was primarily patriotic. Patriotic plays at the time were often demurrals of official policy and England's foreign entanglements. Nancy was set as well as written by Carey, and its main characters are a sailor, Nancy, and a Press Gang officer. The play broke new ground in explicitly treating a contemporary matter of social concern in song (Gillespie 128).

== Death ==
Carey's son, Charles, died in 1743, and Carey hanged himself at his home in London later that year. He was buried in St James Churchyard, Clerkenwell.

While the anonymous account in The Gentleman's Magazine says that Carey had an annuity, he left a pregnant second wife (Sarah, whom he married between 1729 and 1733) and three dependent children, and both Hawkins and The London Stage say that he was despondent over financial difficulties. Grief over the death of his son is another possible explanation of his suicide, and Suzanne Aspden speculates that Carey suffered from paranoia, while others have suspected that he had depression or other maladies. His daughter Anne became an actress and bore an illegitimate son, Edmund Carey, who later was known as the actor Edmund Kean.

== Literary significance ==
Henry Carey's work has been tarred with allegations of triviality since his own day. He had an extraordinary gift with melody and wordplay, and later authors, such as Edward Lear, would cite Carey as a predecessor for his tongue twisters and nonsense verse in Namby Pamby and Chrononhotonthologos. At the same time, Carey's productions were noted in his own day for their political acuity and bravery (if not foolhardiness). He was willing to offend and suffer the consequences of his convictions, but he made his political statements in a diverting and apparently frivolous manner, thereby allowing his friends to respond to his politics and his enemies to dismiss his levity. In the Macaulay-dominated view of literary history of the early 20th-century, Carey was represented as a balladeer whose fundamental moroseness was proven by his shameful suicide, and his plays, now devoid of topicality, were set as broad entertainments.

Musicologists have recognized, however, the subtle gifts necessary for Carey's music, and theater historians are beginning to recognize the context of his plays. He was the most prolific English song composer of 1715–1740, and he wrote his own lyrics to all but twelve of his two hundred and fifty songs (Gillespie 128). He was responsible for linking the vocal style of Henry Purcell to the later style of Arne by combining popular English folks song and tavern song with Italian flourishes.

One of his tunes 'Surrey' survives as the accompaniment to the hymn 'The Lord my pasture shall prepare', a paraphrase of Psalm 23 by Joseph Addison 1672-1719 (New English Hymnal #458).

== References and sources ==
Sources

- Aspden, Suzanne. "Henry Carey," in Matthew, H.C.G. and Brian Harrison, eds. The Oxford Dictionary of National Biography. vol. 10, 80–81. London: OUP, 2004.
- "Boz" (Ed.) (Charles Dickens), Memoirs of Joseph Grimaldi, from Internet Archive (scanned books original editions color illustrated)
- Gillespie, Norman. "Henry Carey," in The New Grove Dictionary of Music and Musicians. vol. 15, 127–128.
- Stephen, Leslie (1887). "Carey, Henry (d.1743)" . In Stephen, Leslie (ed.). Dictionary of National Biography. Vol. 9. London: Smith, Elder & Co.
- Chisholm, Hugh, ed. (1911). "Carey, Henry" . Encyclopædia Britannica. Vol. 5 (11th ed.). Cambridge University Press.
