= Dramatic theory =

Formation of theories about theatre and drama

Dramatic theory attempts to form theories about theatre and drama. Drama is defined as a form of art in which a written play is used as basis for a performance. Dramatic theory is studied as part of theatre studies.

Drama creates a sensory impression in its viewers during the performance. This is the main difference from both poetry and epics, which evoke imagination in the reader.

Dramatic theory was already discussed in the Antiquities p.e. by Aristotle (Poetics) in Ancient Greek and Bharata Muni (Natyasastra) in Ancient India. Some tried to systematize existent plays based on common traits or to justify them compared to other types of plays. Others created schemes for future plays for them to accomplish political or ethical aims or simply as a guide to create good plays.

Modern dramatic theory is based on the idea that drama is a plurimedial form of art. Therefore, a drama cannot be completely comprehended from the text alone. Understanding requires the combination of the text as a substrate and the specific performance of the play. Older theories saw the performance as limited to the interpretation of the text.

== Term ==
In the Antiquities and again from the Renaissance to 1900 drama was the most prestigious form of literature. It was then replaced by epics based on the commercial success of novels. There was constant discussion about the reasons of this prestige and about the differences for drama and other forms of literature. Dramatic theory tried to connect the literary quality of a play with its social standing, especially when it comes to the traditional difference between tragedies and comedies. In the 18th century, the commercial success started to be the reason for a positive or negative assessment of a specific drama. In this context, popular theater, which was privately organized for commercial purposes, started to diverge from the state theaters.

Rivalry between opera and acting also played a role in dramatic theory from the 17th to the 19th century. Depending on the author, opera or acting was coined the real drama. From the 19th century on, movies were included in dramatic theory as a contemporary alternative to live acting (see Film theory).

In the dramatic theory of the last decades, it was popular to see theater as more than just drama (see Performative utterance, Postdramatic theatre). At the end of the 20th century, dramatic theory lost its political and social importance to media theory.

At the beginning of the 20th century, dramatic theory turned from a prescriptive doctrine to a descriptive discipline, analyzing the regularities of dramas.

== Antiquities ==
=== Aristotle ===
The Greek philosopher Plato rejected all types of fictional literature as dangerous for the state in his work Politeia. As drama was politically and religiously important in Athene, his pupil Aristotle (384–322 BC) tried to justify drama in his Poetics. The surviving part of his work deals with tragedies, which according to him brought the better people to the stage than comedies. His thoughts on comedies are not known.

Unlike epics, tragedies should emulate real actions ("mimesis") in direct speech while the action itself is acted out. It is not limited to describing the characters. It should not be something static or purely narrating but dynamically showing the plot. The scenic performance of a tragic plot should provoke lamenting ("eleos") and shuddering ("phobos") in the viewer. Aristotle sees this as desirable, as the discharge of pent-up tensions results in a cleansing from strong affects ("catharsis") leading to inner welfare ("eudamonia"). Thus, theater is helping to maintain public morals instead of destroying them as Plato claimed.

He postulated the unity of time (ends within 24 hours) and plot (not many side stories as in epics). It should feature a finished plot, comprising a beginning, a main part and an end. Later scholars added the unity of space which is not based on Aristotle (Classical unities).

Further terms that are derived from Aristotle's Poetics are the recognition in the climax (anagnorisis) and peripety, the sudden change from fortune to the catastrophe following the climax.

Until the 20th century, many authors tried to legitimize their plays with it being in accordance with the criteria postulated by Aristotle. Even today, most dramatic theories are based on the thoughts of Aristotle. Nonetheless, there are various types of drama which do not conform to Aristotle's theory nor any other dramatic theory.

=== Horace ===
The Roman poet Horace (65–8 BC) writes about drama in his Ars poetica in a time when drama lost the religious dimension the Greeks gave it. Horace wrote that drama needs to connect entertainment and its purpose. Comedies were a common form of entertainment in Rome, while tragedies were somewhat more restricted to events of the upper classes. Therefore, Horace postulated that tragedies had a higher social and artistic value than comedies. This contrasts Aristotle's view that there are only good and bad characters and plots. Horace' view is much discussed in modern times.

== Middle Ages and Humanism ==
The work De spectaculis by Tertullian (ca. 150–220 AD) propagated the abolition of theater due to it being a symptom of the decadence of antique cultures. During the Loss of books in late antiquity, many antique plays and treatises on theater were lost. Until Hrosvitha (10th century), drama was rejected, especially by the Western Church. In the High Middle Ages, popular theater developed in the cities based on liturgical drama. There was no parallel development of dramatic theory.

This theater tradition was again disciplined during the time of Reformation and Counter-Reformation. This is in line with the humanistic theory that contrasts popular theater without rules with theater at the courts that is in accordance with public morals and oriented towards the antique standards. Julius Caesar Scaliger tried to reconcile Platonic and Aristotelian poetics with English Renaissance theatre and Jesuit drama, leading to the 17th-century French drama.

=== Zeami Motokiyo ===
Zeami Motokiyo (c. 1363–1443) was a Japanese actor and author. He wrote several treatise on Noh in order to secure its acceptance as equivalent to other arts. His theory is centered in the concept of 道 michi ('way'). Actors should specialize in a certain role and keep learning about it as a way of achieving artistic perfection. Actions are mostly expressed through singing and dancing and not through mimetic acting (物真似 monomane). Zeami stressed the importance of interaction between the play and the audience.

== Classicism ==
=== Boileau ===
The most important dramatic theorist of the French Classicism was Nicolas Boileau (1636–1711) with his L’art poétique (1669–1674), which is entirely written in verse. He formulates the demands of the Court during Absolutism on drama. The result is the baroque Doctrine classique. It served the Court Nobility as a role model and as a basis for discussing politics. Although Boileau claims to have based his theory on Aristotle and Horace, he diverges a lot from them. Boileau rejects Shakespeare's and Calderón's works as irrational. He saw them as concurrence for his idea of theater and viewed their success as a threat.

To serve the Court, drama should not be overly emotional or educative. There was a much discussion about the estates-clause (the idea that bourgeois characters are not apt to be tragic figures) or the Bienséance (the idea that nothing creational, such as fighting, erotics, eating or older age, should be shown on stage).

Johann Christoph Gottsched tried to establish his theory based on Boileau in the German speaking theater.

=== Corneille ===
Pierre Corneille (1606–1684) formulated his theory in Trois discours sur le poème dramatique (1660). In regard of christian criticism of antique drama, mostly concerning its lack of mercy, Corneille tried to include christian ethics into his theory in order to show, that there is no contradiction between the two.

He based his dramatic theory on baroque martyr-plays, which exhibit an extremely polarized set of characters: The heroes, who are entirely certain of their salvation, and the villains, who are that evil, that they are immediately recognized as such by the spectators.

This polarization led Corneille to the idea, that Aristotle's catharsis means the cleansing of desires, which were regarded as bad. The affects displayed serve as warning for the viewers. The hero can be a villain, which whom the audience will not have compassion, but whom they can fear, or a saint/martyr, whom they have compassion with and adore at the same time. He enriches the classical pair of affects (eleos and phobos) with a third one, adoration. Based on this religious dramatic theory, no suspense or merriness is needed for a good drama.

=== Diderot ===
Denis Diderot (1713–1784) published his dramatic theory in Entretiens sur le fils naturel (1757) and De la poésie dramatique (1758). He justified the need for a renewal with the political situation of the years preceding the French Revolution. He wrote that the privileges of the nobility in drama have to be revised. Tragedies should no longer be limited to noble characters, while lower classes should no longer be laughed at in comedies. He proposed a bourgeois tragedy (he himself called it genre sérieux) which he conceptualized as an intermediary between comedy and tragedy.

=== Lessing ===
Gotthold Ephraim Lessing (1729–1781) was less concerned with defending drama against christian morality than Corneille. He demanded a bourgeois drama and stressed the importance of positive affects on stage and in the audience. Lessing published his theory in regularly appearing magazine, the Hamburgische Dramaturgie (1767).

He defended the emancipation of popular theater to court drama. He wanted to abolish the estate-clause and criticized most dramatic characters of the time as flat. He demanded that characters be not stereotypical or polar but show the entire range of human emotions and thoughts. This makes the motives of a character psychologically understandable. Instead of the former focus on the relation of humans, their estates and god, he postulated that drama should focus on the psychological processes guiding the plot.

Lessing saw the purpose of tragedies in making the spectator a better person by allowing him to feel compassion. Compassion has become socially accepted by that time due to it passing as a christian posture. Lessing wanted to use compassion to revolt against the behavioral rules in the courts.

Lessing thought that the purpose of comedy is to help the audience perceive the ridiculous and therewith help them to become morally better people. This contrasts comedies played in the courts, as they portrayed the ridiculous not as a human attribute, but as a social one.

Gustav Freytag wrote, that Lessing had a national interpretation of the beauty of drama. The term national was meant to bridge the difference in between the drama of the courts and popular theater, and thereby concealing the dimension of social criticism in Lessings work. Furthermore, Freytag tried to position Lessing's theory against French drama, which he saw as a rival to German drama.

=== Goethe ===
The bourgeois theater became a reality for Johann Wolfgang von Goethe (1749–1832). There were some noteworthy authors writing drama in German. He did not have to defend theater against the nobility and the church or against the Italian opera and French drama. Instead, he tried to reconcile them. His Weimar Classicism used antique characters and court behavioral rules and remodeled them to fit his ideal. Characters should be natural, without any societal differentiation, to bring bourgeois and nobility together.

He rejected the idea that drama has to follow a strict formal scheme. Goethe wanted to overcome the shackles of a formal scheme and follow the example of William Shakespeare, whom he described as a naïve dramatician (Shakespeare und kein Ende, 1813). When he started to bring his antique characters to the stage, the theatrical world had already moved on from classicist plays.

=== Schiller ===
Friedrich Schiller (1759–1805), alike Goethe, wanted that Classicism move closer to antique ideals then the French one. Characters speaking in verse, in order for them not to be too close to the common and be closer to poetry, were rather important for him. It is controversial, whether or not he saw the educational as important in drama.

In his letter to Goethe from the 24th November 1797, he stated that he found speaking in verse had more dignity than prose. He also defends the use of choirs in modern theater and criticized the French drama not using choirs or the classical unities (Über den Gebrauch des Chores in der Tragödie, 1803).

== 19th century ==
=== Freytag ===
Gustav Freytag (1816–1895) understood dramatic theory as a manual for drama. His ideal was a uniformly built, closed drama. He connected this to the idea of a unified Germany.

His work Die Technik des Dramas (1863) is a textbook for dramaturges and authors which had an enormous impact as his scheme of drama as rigid and easy to understand. He tried to reconnect to antique and classicist dramatic theory in line with historicism. Especially his pyramidal structure of the plot proofed to be popular. He described the plot as consisting of five acts, which he said was the result of the suspense in the play: 'I. Exposure, II. Climactic plot with thrilling momentum, III. Climax and Peripety, IV. Falling plot with retardant momentum, V. Catastrophe.

Whether Freytag's description is in deed a role model and whether or not it is applicable to antique or contemporary drama is disputed.

=== Wagner ===
In the Italian tradition from the 15th century on, opera was equivalent to drama. It also became a popular concurrence for acting in other parts of Europe. In the early 19th century, it started to lose ground. This is the basis for Richard Wagners (1813–1883) dramatic theory, which he published in Oper und Drama (1852) and Das Kunstwerk der Zukunft. Wagner, unlike Freytag, saw himself as a revolutionary, who, after the failure of the German Revolution (1848/49), was troubled with the political hardship. He postulated his concept of a uniform artwork as a model for the society itself, as a cooperatives of people holding the same opinions fighting against the feudal society.

Wagner saw opera and acting as misshapen revitalization of antique dramas. He presented his own operas as the future of drama, in which music and the choir are thought to assume the role it had in Greek drama. He used the choir as a melodramatic commenting orchestra. The concept of theater should also reconnect to the concept of a festival, as it did in Ancient Greek, where drama were performed for religious reasons. Friedrich Nietzsche supported this in his work Die Geburt der Tragödie aus dem Geiste der Musik (1872). Wagner was heavily criticized for his attempt to include the religious dimension of drama form the Athenian original into his opera.

== 20th century ==
=== Brecht ===
Bertolt Brecht (1898–1956) positioned himself against naturalism, which he saw as bourgeois theater closing its eyes before the social and political reality. He read the Aristotelian dramatic theory as close to the dramatic theory of his time, therefore, he wanted to develop a non-Aristotelian theater. Nonetheless, his theory is not opposed to Aristotle but mostly to the reception thereof in the 19th century.

Brecht's Epic Theater is a contradiction in itself, because its epics are the opposite of drama. It makes sense for him to combine them, because he forbids to imitate the actions displayed in order to create a distance to the audience. The audience should constantly think about whether or not the acting of the character does conform tho their (social) feeling of responsibility. Brecht wanted to encourage this through distancing effects.

=== Dürrenmatt ===
Friedrich Dürrenmatt (1921–1990) was influenced by the experience of World War II and the atomic bomb. In his work Theaterprobleme (1955), he discusses the difference between tragedy and comedy and comments on Brecht's Epic Theater. While he supports the distance of the audience from the plot, he disagrees on the ideal of educative drama.

Dürrenmatt meant that there is no more tragedy, as noblemen and military figures are no longer representative, "the tragic hero is without name". The contemporary world can only be described with the characters of comedy, the common people. In addition, the classical blame of the tragedy does no longer work: „Alle können nichts dafür und haben es nicht gewollt“ (No one is to blame and no one wanted it). He concludes that the future of drama is comedy. Tragic elements can be included in comedy, the way to go is grotesque.

=== Esslin ===
Martin Esslin (1918–2002) categorized the schools of modern dramatics that developed from the avant garde after 1900 under the term Theatre of the Absurde. They rejected naturalism as well as what they perceived as authoritarian theater, any demand that theater should educate or make sense. Esslin's theory is a scientific description of those philosophical and artistic schools of thought which encompass authors such as Eugène Ionesco or Samuel Beckett.

=== Structuralistic approaches ===
Structuralistic approaches had a lot of influence on literature science and linguistics until the 1970's, but was largely ignored in dramatic theory. Nonetheless, some dramaturges included structuralistic analyses into their work and some literature scientists, such as Herta Schmid, tried to develop a structuralistic dramatic theory. This meant to study the structure of the dramatic text. It shows aspects that are neglected when focusing on the content only, p.e. they compare different editions and ask for their differences in meaning as well as the analysis of paratexts.

== See also ==
- Dramaturgy
- Hyperdrama
- Literary theory
