= Belustigungen des Verstandes und des Witzes =

German journal

Belustigungen des Verstandes und des Witzes (German: Amusements of the Mind and of Wit) was an important literary magazine from the circle around Johann Christoph Gottsched (1700–1766). Its editor, Johann Joachim Schwabe (1714–1784), is considered one of the most energetic and versatile publicists of the German Enlightenment, who also emerged as the editor of the most extensive and significant German-language collection of travel accounts of the 18th century (under the title Allgemeine Historie der Reisen zu Wasser und zu Lande).

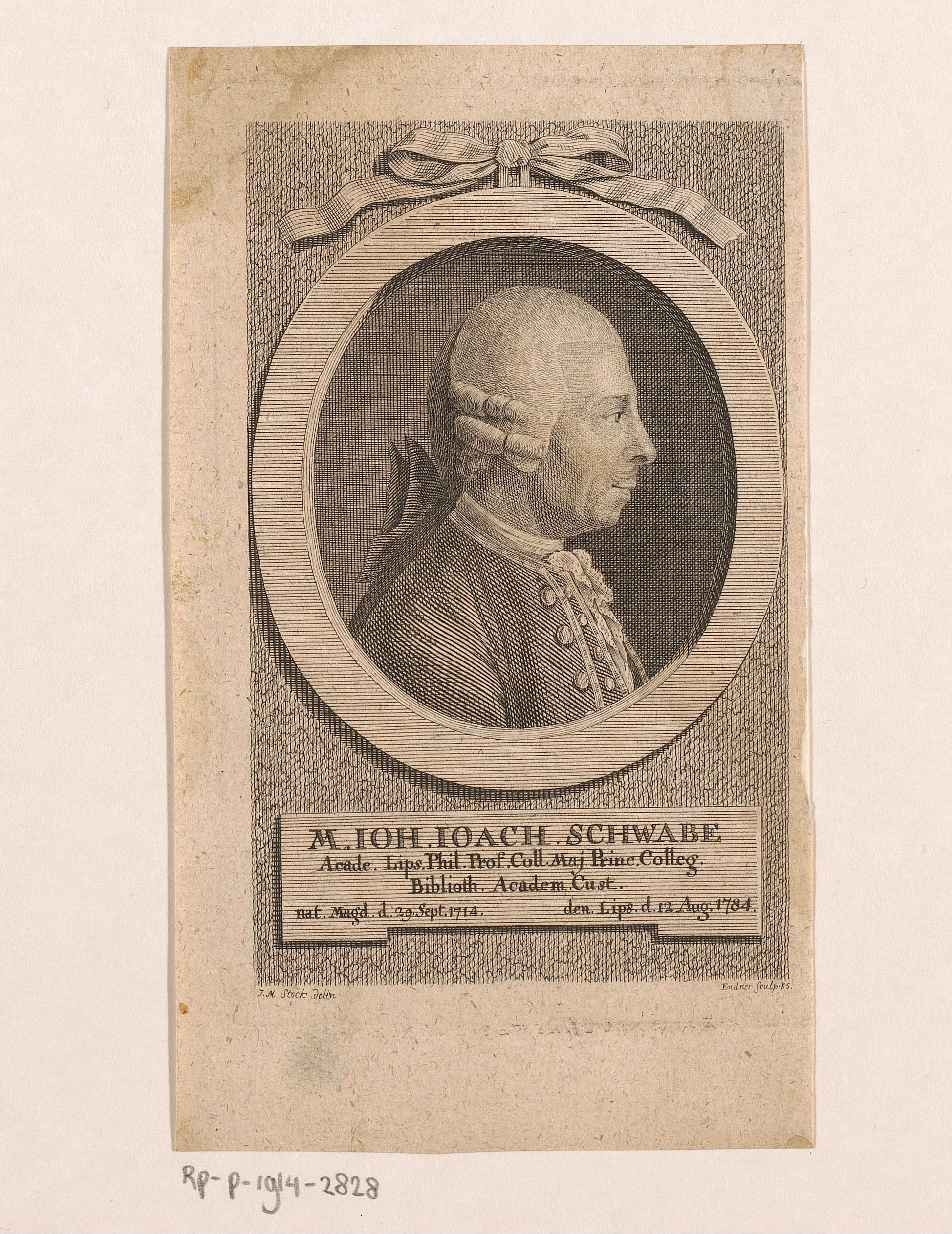
Johann Joachim Schwabe (1714–1784), editor of the journal

== History ==
The founding of the journal occurred at a time when the literary dispute with the Swiss writers Johann Jakob Bodmer and Johann Jakob Breitinger, which had been emerging since 1738, intensified. Gottsched considered it expedient “to launch a seemingly independent magazine and to create in it a platform for himself and his followers, partly for defense and partly for open attack”. (Franz Ulbrich).

Apart from its significance in the German–Swiss literary dispute, the journal is important in several other respects: it represents the first notable example of a belletristic, “poetisch-productives” organ, as Robert Prutz typologically distinguished it from the literary-critical journal. It is also memorable because a number of influential authors of the period contributed to Belustigungen and published their first literary creations there, which “either not reprinted or partly altered later by their author.”

The journal was published from 1741 to 1745 in a total of eight semiannual volumes. Contributors included Christian Fürchtegott Gellert, Abraham Gotthelf Kästner, Johann Michael Herbart, Johann Jacob Schilling, Johann Christoph Gottsched, Johann Joachim Schwabe among others, with many contributions appearing anonymously. Following the French model, the journal offered a collection of prose and poetry, but without translations, “for the German spirit should finally free itself and reveal itself in its creative power”.

Johann Joachim Schwabe (1714–1784), editor of the journal, was one of the most energetic and versatile publicists of the German Enlightenment. As a close student and friend of Gottsched, he attempted with the journal to disseminate and defend Gottsched’s ideas.

According to the judgment of the literary historian Gustav Waniek (ADB), the Belustigungen are „the most important literary-historical monument of the first emergence of freed forces from the spell of crude sobriety, and of the beginning struggle of imagination for the privileged position in poetry that had been denied to it”.

== Bibliography ==
- Franz Ulbrich: Die Belustigungen des Verstandes und des Witzes : ein Beitrag zur Journalistik des 18. Jahrhunderts. 1911
- Jürgen Wilke: Literarische Zeitschriften des 18. Jahrhunderts (1688-1789). Teil II: Repertorium. Sammlung Metzler, 175. 2017
- Andreas Herzog: "Belustigungen des Verstandes und des Witzes". Die Zeitschriften der Aufklärung - Beginn einer literarischen Öffentlichkeit. In: Leipziger Blätter 1998, H. 32, S. 31-33 - Online
