= Johann Kaspar Lavater =

Swiss poet (1741–1801)

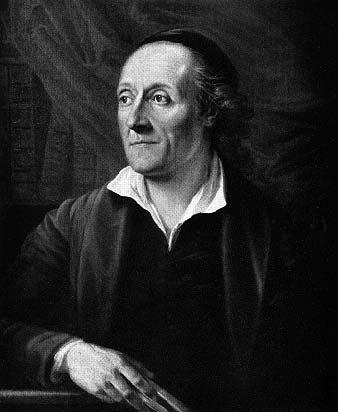
Johann Kaspar Lavater, by August Friedrich Oelenhainz

Johann Kaspar (or Caspar) Lavater (Swiss Standard German: [ˈlaːvaːtər]; 15 November 1741 – 2 January 1801) was a Swiss poet, writer, philosopher, physiognomist and Reformed theologian.

== Early life ==
Lavater was born in Zürich, and was educated at the Gymnasium there, where J. J. Bodmer and J. J. Breitinger were amongst his teachers.

== Corruption fighter ==
At barely twenty-one years of age, Lavater greatly distinguished himself by denouncing, in conjunction with his friend Henry Fuseli the painter, an iniquitous magistrate, who was compelled to make restitution of his ill-gotten gains.

== Zwinglian ==
In 1769 Lavater took Holy Orders in Zurich's Zwinglian Church, and officiated until his death as deacon or pastor in churches in his native city. His oratorical fervor and genuine depth of conviction gave him great personal influence; he was extensively consulted as a casuist, and was welcomed with enthusiasm on his journeys throughout Germany. His writings on mysticism were widely popular as well.

In the same year (1769), Lavater tried to convert Moses Mendelssohn to Christianity, by sending him a translation of Charles Bonnet's Palingénésie philosophique, and demanding that he either publicly refute Bonnet's arguments or convert. Mendelssohn refused to do either, and many prominent intellectuals took Mendelssohn's side, including Lichtenberg and Herder.

== Physiognomy ==
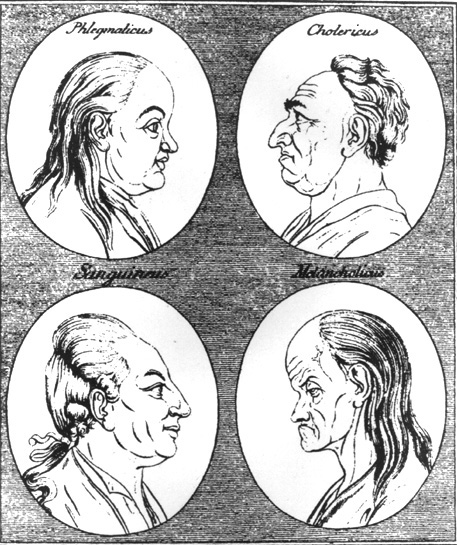
Image of woodcut from Physiognomische Fragmente zur Beförderung der Menschenkenntnis und Menschenliebe (1775-1778)

Lavater became best known for his work in the field of physiognomy, Physiognomische Fragmente zur Beförderung der Menschenkenntnis und Menschenliebe, published between 1775 and 1778. He introduced the idea that physiognomy related to the specific character-traits of individuals, rather than to general types.

Lavater is attributed with catalysing a golden age for silhouettes through this work in physiognomy. According to him, the character of a person could be elucidated through examining their "lines of countenance". The most accurate of readings were facilitated by the tracing of a profile outline portrait. This contour line could be filled with black or cut from the white paper and placed over a black backing. More often, the silhouette was simply cut from black paper. In his chapter "On Shades", Lavater wrote: “What can less the image of a living man be than a shade? Yet how full of speech! Little gold, but the purest."

The fame of Lavater's book, which found admirers in France and England as well as in Germany, rested largely upon the handsome style of publication and the accompanying illustrations.

The two principal sources from which Lavater developed his physiognomical studies were the writings of the Italian polymath Giambattista della Porta (1535-1615), and the observations made by Sir Thomas Browne in his Religio Medici (1642; translated into German in 1748 and praised by Lavater).

Lavater's studies have also been related to the work of Franz Xaver Messerschmidt (1736-1783) as a sculptor. Ernst Gombrich characterised Lavater's influence as a "physiognomic fallacy".

== Poet ==
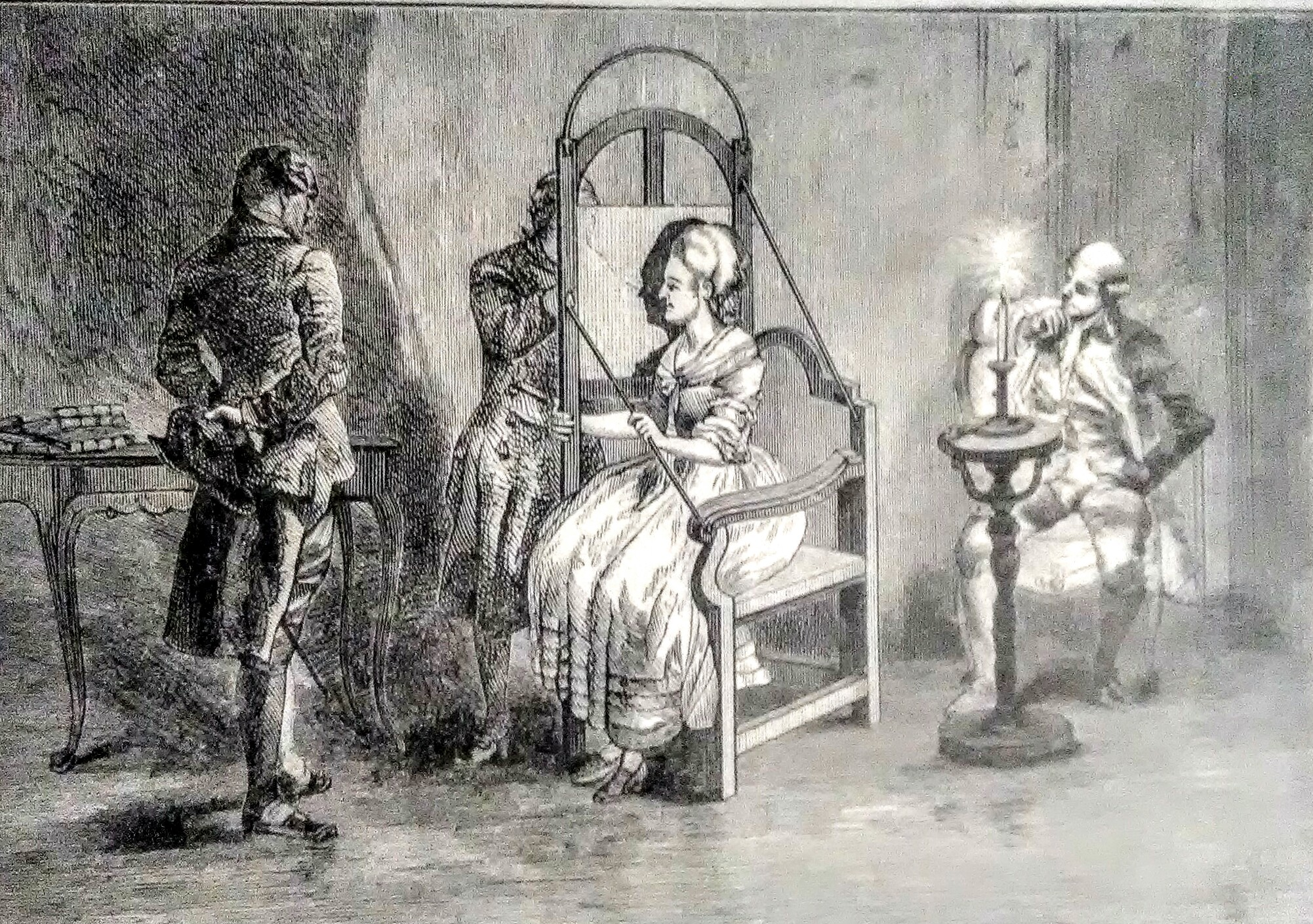
Lavater's Apparatus for Taking Silhouettes. --(From an ancient engraving of 1783)

As a poet, Lavater published Christliche Lieder (1776–1780) and two epics, Jesus Messias (1780) and Joseph von Arimathia (1794), in the style of Klopstock. More relevant to the religious temperament of Lavater's times are his introspective Aussichten in die Ewigkeit (4 volumes 1768-1778), Geheimes Tagebuch von einem Beobachter seiner selbst (2 volumes, 1772–1773), and Pontius Pilatus, oder der Mensch in allen Gestalten (4 volumes, 1782–1785).

== Goethe ==
From 1774 on, Goethe was intimately acquainted with Lavater, but later had a falling out with him, accusing him of superstition and hypocrisy.

== Blake ==
In 1788 William Blake annotated Lavater's Aphorisms on Man. Lavater published 632 aphorisms in all. Blake considered the following aphorism to be an excellent example of an aphorism. "40. Who, under pressing temptations to lie, adheres to truth, nor to the profane betrays aught of a sacred trust, is near the summit of wisdom and virtue."

== Last days ==
During his later years, Lavater's influence waned, and he incurred considerable ridicule due to his vanity. His conduct during the French occupation of Switzerland brought about his death. On the taking of Zürich by the French in 1799, Lavater, while trying to appease the aggressors, was shot by an infuriated grenadier; he died over a year later in Zürich.

The Swiss artist and illustrator, Warja Honegger-Lavater, was a direct descendant of Johann Kaspar Lavater.

== Publications ==
- Vermischte Schriften (2 volumes, 1774–1781)
- Kleinere prosaische Schriften (3 volumes, 1784–1785)
- Nachgelassene Schriften (5 volumes, 1801–1802)
- Sämtliche Werke (poems only; 6 volumes, 1836–1838)
- Ausgewählte Schriften (8 volumes, 1841–1844).
- Physiognomische Fragmente zur Beförderung der Menschenkenntnis und Menschenliebe

== Sources ==
- The Faces of physiognomy : interdisciplinary approaches to Johann Caspar Lavater. Edited by Ellis Shookman. Columbia, SC : Camden House, 1993. (ISBN 1879751518)
