= Édouard Hocquart =

French artist

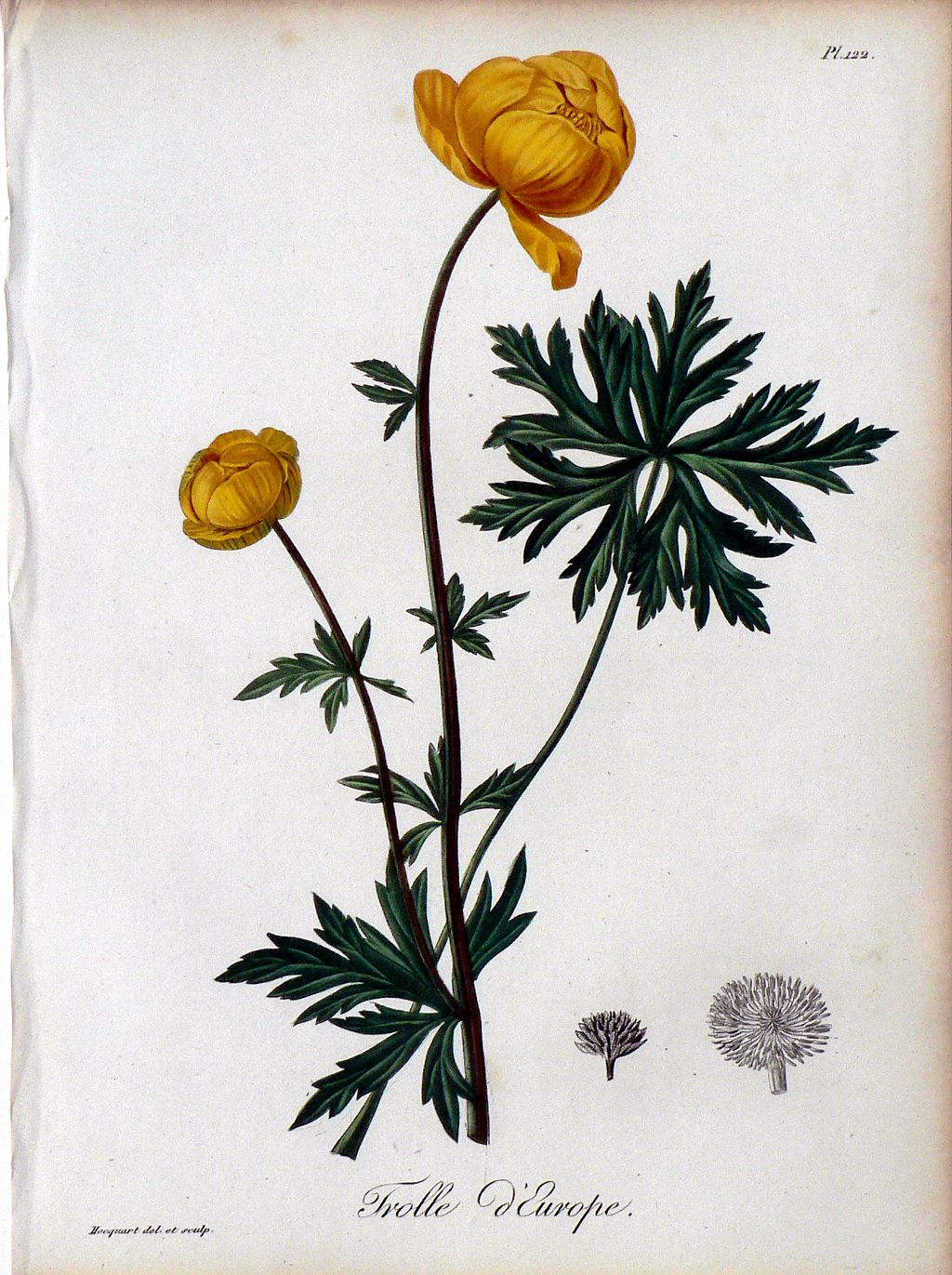
Trollius europaeus

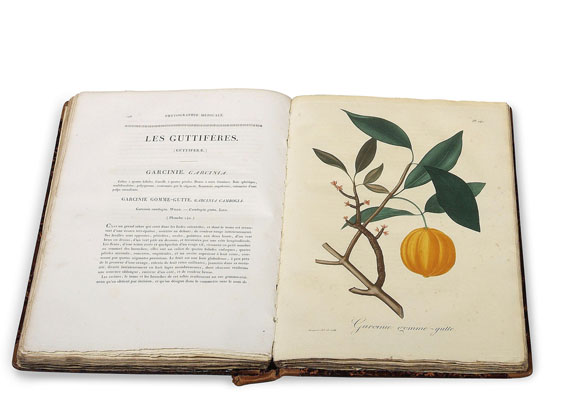
Phytographie médicale

Édouard Auguste Patrice Hocquart (1789–1870), frequently cited as L. F. J. Hoquart, was a French publisher, writer, artist and engraver, noted for his colour plates illustrating Joseph R. Roques's (1772–1850) materia medica publication Phytographie médicale of 1821–1824.

In addition Hocquart wrote many useful guides for the common man, such as Le secrétaire de tout le monde : ou, La correspondance usuelle (1881), detailing "the principles of the art of letter writing, the instructions of the French Department of Posts and Telegraphs, models of family letters, requests, trading, petitions for all positions and circumstances, the procedures followed for common actions, such as purchasing, sales, deposits, leases, powers of attorney, contracts, acts for mayors and rural police, and finishing with a course of instruction on compatibility and some State laws". Another was his 1842 work Alphabet des métiers, an alphabetic list of professions, illustrated with woodcuts. According to WorldCat Identities there are "230 of his works in 367 publications in 4 languages and 479 library holdings".

== Selected works ==
- L’art de juger du caractère des hommes sur leur écriture with Johann Caspar Lavater, (Paris 1816)
- Petit dictionnaire de la langue française, suivant l'orthographe de l'Académie (6 editions published between 1819 and 1842)
- Dictionnaire classique des hommes célèbres de toutes les nations, depuis les temps les plus reculés jusqu'à ce jour (Auguste Delalain, Paris, 1822) ISBN 0543831426
- La morale en action ou Choix de faits mémorables et instructifs, propres a faire aimer la religion, la sagesse, a former le coeur par l'exemple de toutes les vertus microforme : a l'usage de toutes les écoles (1825) ASIN: B007MNZAZ8
- La Morale en Action ou Choix de Faits Mémorables et Instructifs... (1825)
- Le Duc De Berry, Ou, Vertus Et Belles Actions D'un Bourbon ISBN 1174227362
- Alphabet des petits fabulistes (Moronval, Paris, 1843)
- Physiognomies des hommes politiques du jour, jugés d'apres̀ le système de Lavater, avec un précis de la science physiognomonique with Johann Caspar Lavater (1741–1801) (Paris, A. Royer, 1843)
