= Love and Politics =

Love and Politics can refer to several creative works:

- Love and Politics (play), or Kabale und Liebe, a 1784 play by Friedrich Schiller
