= Joseph Roques =

Joseph Roques may refer to:

- Guillaume-Joseph Roques (1757–1847), French neoclassical and romantic painter
- Joseph R. Roques (1772–1850), French botanist and physician
