= Ständeklausel =

The Ständeklausel (estates-clause) was a principle in poetic theatre, by which attempts were made to transfer the principles of Classicist French drama into German theatre. It is often connected with Johann Christoph Gottsched. It stated that only kings, princes and other people of high rank were to be shown in tragedies and that those of the middle classes could only be shown onstage in comedies. It also demarcated audiences in theatre concessions granted by ancien regime princes - only theatres in courts were allowed to put on tragedies (including ballets and serious operas), while the rapidly proliferating Volkstheaters were only allowed to put on comedies, including comic operas and pantomimes. It was broken by the onset of Bourgeois tragedy such as Love and Intrigue.
