= Intrigue and Love =

1784 five-act play by Friedrich Schiller

Kabale und Liebe Intrigue and Love
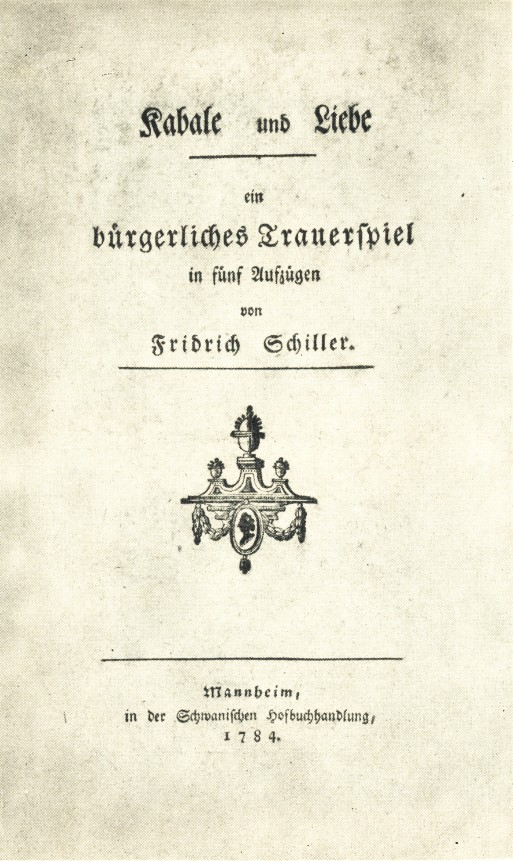
- Title page to the first edition, 1784
- Original language: German
- Genre: Bourgeois tragedy

Premiere
- Date premiered: 13 April 1784
- Place premiered: Schauspiel Frankfurt

Intrigue and Love, sometimes Love and Intrigue, Love and Politics, or Luise Miller (German: Kabale und Liebe, pronounced [kaˈbaːlə ʔʊnt ˈliːbə]; literally "Cabal and Love") is a five-act play written by the German dramatist Friedrich Schiller. His third play, it was first performed on 13 April 1784 at Schauspiel Frankfurt. The play shows how cabals and their intrigue destroy the love between Ferdinand von Walter, a nobleman's son, and Luise Miller, daughter of a middle-class musician.

== Characters ==
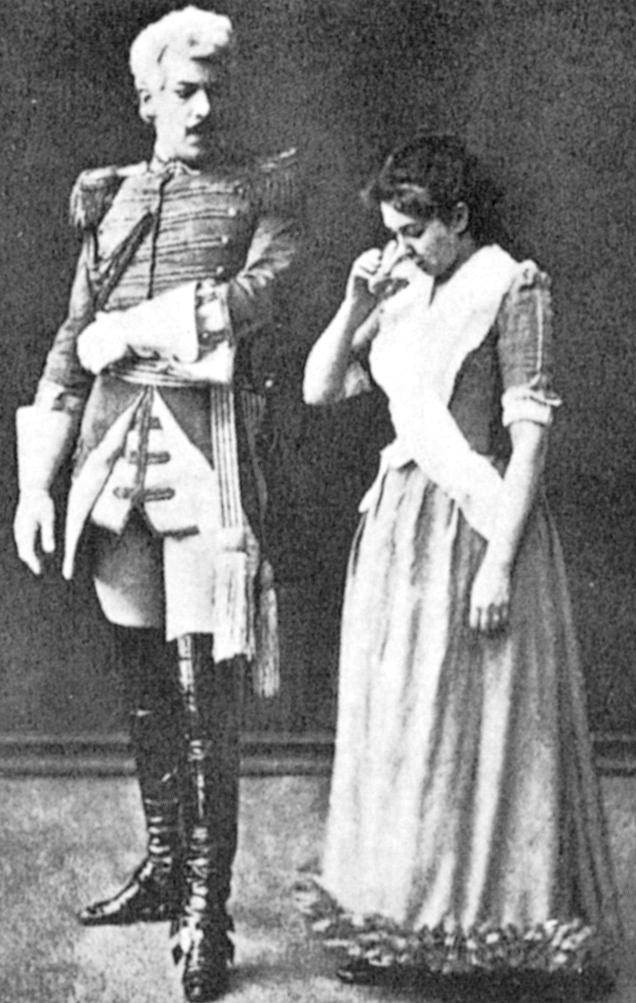
Konstantin Stanislavski with his soon-to-be wife Maria Lilina, playing Ferdinand and Louise in the Moscow Society of Art and Literature's production in 1889

- President von Walter, at a German prince's court
- Ferdinand, the president's son, an army major
- Hofmarschall von Kalb
- Lady (Emilie) Milford, favourite of the prince
- Wurm, the president's private secretary
- Miller, town musician or "Kunstpfeifer"
- Miller's wife
- Luise, Miller's daughter
- Sophie, maid to Lady Milford
- A valet to the prince
- Various minor characters

== Plot ==
Ferdinand is an army major and son of President von Walter, a high-ranking noble in a German duke's court, while Luise Miller is the daughter of a middle-class musician. The couple fall in love with each other, but both their fathers tell them to end their affair. The president instead wants to expand his own influence by marrying off his son Ferdinand to Lady Milford, the duke's mistress. However, Ferdinand rebels against his father's plan and tries to persuade Luise to elope with him. The president and his secretary Wurm (Ferdinand's rival) concoct an insidious plot, arresting Luise's parents for no reason. Luise declares, in a love letter to the Hofmarschall von Kalb, that only by death can she obtain her parents' release. Luise is also forced to swear an oath to God to state she wrote this letter (actually forced on her) of her own free will. This letter is leaked to Ferdinand and deliberately evokes jealousy and vengeful despair in him.

Luise tries to get released from her oath by suicide, dying before Ferdinand and restoring their love's innocence, but her father puts a stop to this by putting massive moral and religious pressure on the couple. This means she has only silence and the lie required by the oath to counter the charges against her. Luise is released from her secrecy by death, revealing the intrigue to Ferdinand and forgiving him, and Ferdinand reaches out his hand to his father at the moment of his death, which the President interprets as his son's forgiveness.

In a subplot, Lady Milford is shown in a position between the middle and upper classes, in love with Ferdinand. She is confronted with Luise's pure and simple love for Ferdinand. Despite Lady Milford's love for him, they are intent on marriage and withdrawing from the world of the court.

== Themes ==
In 1784 Schiller published his theoretical work The Theatre Considered as a Moral Institution, whose central idea was to present tragedy as a means of theodicy, with theatre's mission being to show the restoration of divine justice onstage. This righteousness is visible in Intrigue and Love, since ultimately, its final court of appeal is not secular justice but God himself. Schiller saw education as another function of theatre, to bring the audience to catharsis to complete their education and so make the theatre a "moral institution". He saw its most important function, however, as to mediate between freedom and necessity, showing an idealised version of the individual's struggle with and victory over social, moral and religious constraints onstage.

Intrigue and Love belongs to the era of Sturm und Drang and is categorised as a bourgeois tragedy, a genre attributable to Gotthold Ephraim Lessing – Lessing's own Emilia Galotti is a key influence on it. Tragedy had previously been limited to the nobility, through the Ständeklausel or "estates clause", but Lessing's genre opened it to the world of the German middle classes. Intrigue and Love has as its dominant motif the conflict between the middle-classes and the nobility in middle-class pride and aristocratic snobbery, with universal humanity at its centre, charged with open political grievances. In it, individual interests, subjective feelings and the demand for freedom from a class-ridden society's constraints are powerful drivers for the characters and ultimately lead to disaster. Schiller was personally aware of the pain of love across the classes, through his love for Charlotte von Wolzogen (sister in law of Caroline von Wolzogen – Caroline was sister of Charlotte von Lengefeld, who would later become Schiller's wife).

Charles Eugene, Duke of Württemberg had just arrested Schiller and banned his works, in punishment for his unauthorised departure to attend the premiere of his play The Robbers. Thus, in September 1782 Schiller fled the Duke's sphere of influence, moved to Mannheim and started work on Intrigue and Love as a response to this arbitrary injustice. This can be seen in some of the play's themes:

- The extravagance at the ducal court – Although Württemberg was a relatively poor country at the time of Schiller, Charles Eugene lived his life along the lines of the French royal court at the Palace of Versailles, financing expensive balls, hunts and festivals by exploiting his people and selling his population as mercenaries.
- Trade in soldiers – In Schiller's time one of Charles Eugene's ways of raising money was to 'sell off' farmers', craftsmen's and labourers' sons to serve abroad as mercenaries, such as in the American Revolutionary War, sometimes by violence, drugging or abduction.
- Mistresses – For a long time Charles Eugene ran a system of mistresses, including Franziska von Leutrum (later the Duke's official partner and wife, and the basis for the character Lady Milford, especially in her influence on the duke).
- Intrigues – In Schiller's time the acting minister of the Württemberg court, count Samuel Monmartin, had brought about the downfall of his rivals via forged letters and gained the exclusive confidence of the Prince.
- Despotism – How justified Schiller's critique of the duke's rule was can be seen in the treatment of the journalist and poet Christian Friedrich Daniel Schubart, who took offence at the appalling conditions in the duchy and was imprisoned without the verdict of a court.

=== Language ===
Schiller makes use of an elevated style, pathos and hyperboles in order to describe the cynical and cold world of the court. The integrated French passages serve the uncovering of the court with its empty conversations and inclination for glamorous appearances. The President's speech is polished, calculated and imperatively arrogant. Secretary Wurm can be understood as a smaller copy of him. Kalb's speech can be seen as parallel to Mrs. Miller's speech. Kalb talks stupidly, unnatural and affected, often using the wrong expression.

Schiller contrasts the unnatural speech of the court with the direct and often rough speech of the married couple Miller. Miller is characterized through his speech as the simple man. He emphasizes his opinions with common sayings. Mrs. Miller's speech is also associated with the middle class. Her wrong usage of foreign words, sayings and dialect reveals her middle-class origin.

The speech of the lovers Lady Milford, Luise and Ferdinand takes on a special position. Their use of language usually does not display their social standings.

=== Structure ===
The composition of the play follows a strict system which can be described with terms such as "symmetry" and "dialectic principle". Similarity and asimilarity characterize content and style of the play. This becomes especially clear in the sequence of the scenes which switches regularly between the world of the middle class and the absolutist court. The "small" world is contrasted with the "big world" dialectically and a symmetry in the sequence of scenes is attained. The composition of the plot is also regarded as principle of symmetry. Examples for this are the three scenes between Ferdinand and Luise at the beginning, the middle and the end. The first one shows the secret opposition of the two lovers, the second one makes it an urgent matter in the turning point, and the third one seals it in death.

=== Social groups ===
There are two opposing social groups in the play: the middle class and the nobility.

==== Middle class ====
Miller is a respectable, genuine musician who is deeply religious and has a fixed position in the guild order of the city: on the one hand, confident, fearless and honest, on the other hand, restricted by close limits and not free from the sovereignty. Miller strictly believes in corporative thinking and thus rejects the marriage of his middle-class-daughter with the noble Ferdinand. However, he gives Luise the freedom to choose a husband within corporative order because he regards the custom of the father to choose his daughter's husband as outdated. Towards his wife, he behaves as the commanding patriarch, while he shared a tender love with his daughter. His middle-class confidence is reflected clearly in his argument with the President: Despite his big respect, he contradicts the President and insists on his householder's rights. He makes it perfectly clear that in his eyes, the corrupt world of nobility is morally beneath the middle-class world. At the same time, he is not immune to the temptation of wealth. When Ferdinand offers him money for the "three months long happy dream of his daughter", Miller is overwhelmed by the opportunities this wealth offers and behaves very affable and friendly towards him.

Mrs. Miller holds hopes of social ascendency regarding Luise's relationship to Ferdinand and secretly encourages their love affair. Moreover, she feels flattered by the association of a noble man with her house. That is why she rejects Wurm in a conversation as son-in-law. Nevertheless, owing to her talkativeness and naivety, she passes information about the relationship of Ferdinand and Luise to him, which he knows how to use for his schemes. She can hardly hold her ground against her husband. She also takes on a timid and submissive attitude towards the President and embodies the typical servile spirit.

Luise, Mr. Miller's 16-year-old daughter, is introduced as the "most beautiful example of a blonde", who "would cut a fine figure next to the first beauty of court". She is deeply rooted in her family and shares an especially close relationship with her father. This relationship between father and daughter could be strengthened by the fact that she is an only child. Luise grew up protected and was brought up Christianly. Her thoughts and actions are shaped by her faith; the immoral life at court repels her. The encounter with Ferdiand creates a conflict between her love for Ferdinand and the expectations of her father, the social limits willed by God and her religious conviction. This way, the Immanuel Kant's opposition between duty and inclination becomes clear. Luise is very conscious of reality.

Wurm is the secretary and confidante of the President. Dramaturgically seen, he is a spineless schemer who would do anything for wealth and prestige. He is the source of the intrigue of which he also expects a marriage to his desired Luise. He climbed the social ladder through his unscrupulousness and steps down and grovels up. Another kind of interpretation would be that only his love for Luise and his desire to marry her compel him to carry on this intrigue.

==== Nobility ====
Invisible but still prominent in the background is the Prince as an absolutist ruler who does not care about his subjects' well-being. He does not appear personally, but his wedding plans, his life in court, and his governance influence the lives of all characters.

President von Walter, Ferdinand's father, obtained his position by murdering his predecessor. His whole behavior is adjusted in order to stabilize his position in court – and possibly to extend it – and to secure the duke's favor. He places this calculus of power above other people, values and feelings; he sees love as a foolish rave: a marriage should serve dynastic or political goals alone. Not until the dying Ferdinand forgives him does he recognize his mistakes as such. He realizes that people cannot be moved like chessmen, but follow feelings and values that are not simply subordinate to utilitarian considerations or the pursuit of power. Feeling remorse, he delivers himself up to justice, thus quitting his career.

Ferdinand is a typical representative of Sturm und Drang, as passionate, with a temper, unrealistic and self-absorbed. Usually, the middle-class Luise would be considered as an unsuitable bride for the President's son. However, Ferdinand cares less about social classes and more about personal qualities of people. In accordance with the tradition of the Enlightenment, he despises the schemes of the courtly world. He complains about injustice, inhumanity and immorality of the absolutist order. He tries to burst the order, and he appeals to "nature" and "God". His possessive mentality and his absolute love to Luise (rather self-absorbed), connected with his emotional actions, are distinctive of Jean-Jacques Rousseau's contemporary doctrines and lead, already early in the play, to his unfounded jealousy of Luise. Obsessed by the idea of absolute love, he takes on the role of the avenger and kills an innocent.

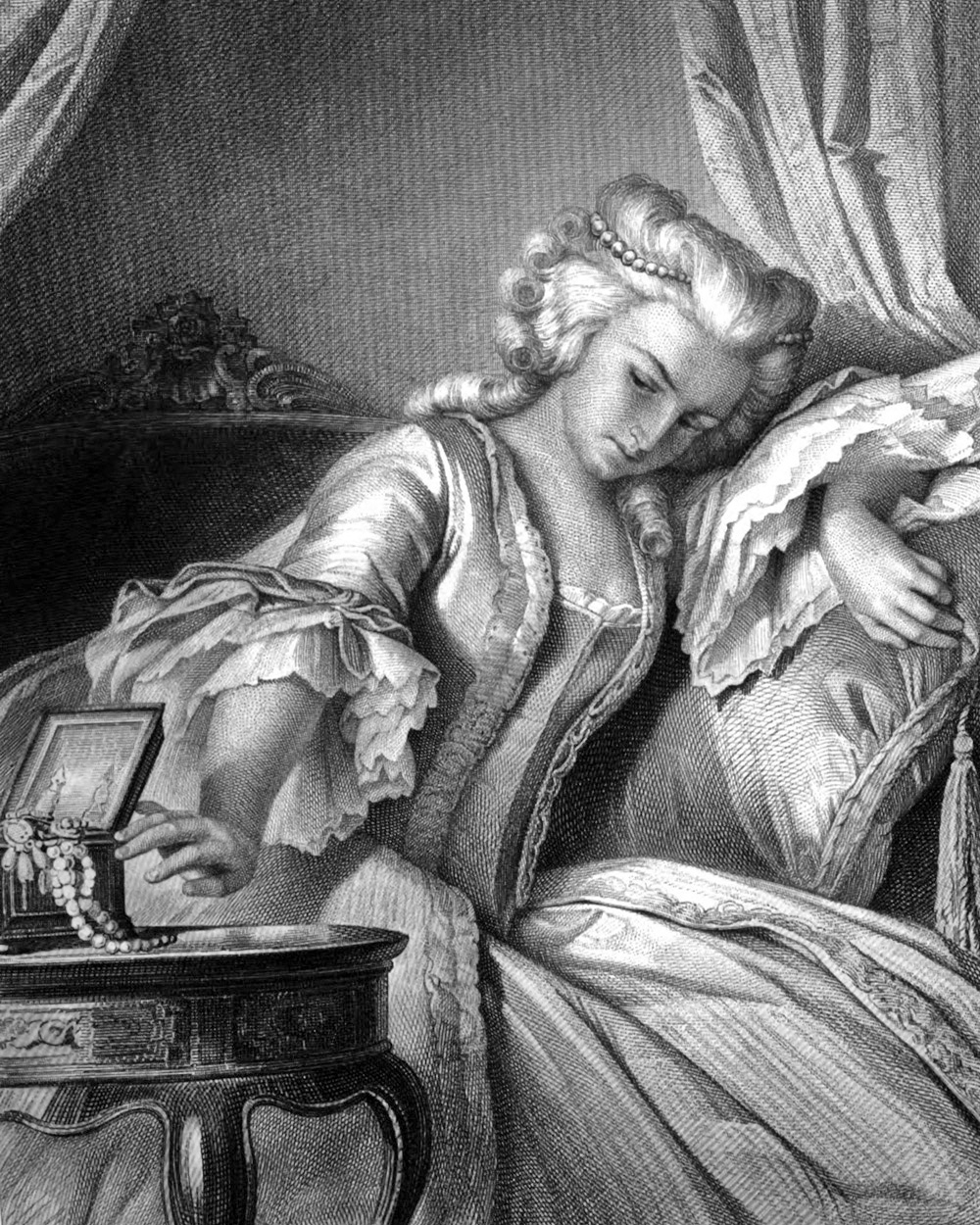
Lady Milford, 1859 engraving after Arthur von Ramberg

Lady Milford, aka Johanna von Norfolk, the Prince's mistress, takes on the middle position between courtly and middle-class value systems. An orphan who fled from England to German exile, she returns the Prince's love out of necessity and becomes his mistress. This position enables her to be a part of society and satisfies her ambition. She is also able to alleviate the injustices in the Principality and influence the Prince. The wedding plans with Ferdinand were also contrived by her, not the President. Lady Milford longs for true love; she wants to leave the country with Ferdinand and start a new chapter in life. When Ferdinand rejects her love, she tries to force him into marriage by all available means, knowing that she cannot win over his heart. Lady Milford fears possible humiliation and is not willed to revoke the publicly announced connection. Threatening and making promises, she tries to make Luise give up Ferdinand, but her pretentious mask shatters; struck by Luise's higher virtues, she quits her affair with the Prince and leaves the country. Overall, she appears as a woman who wanted good but got drawn into the wasteful and scheming goings-on of the court. The pursuit of honor and power throws a shadow on her humanity that shows in her behavior towards the people and her servants. In the end, she makes a clear decision, leaves the country and breaks away from the entanglement.

There is also the coward and chatty Hofmarschall von Kalb; dependent on President von Walter, he is a court cringer who personifies the court's lifestyle that is directed at outer appearance. He knows that, as a person without particular qualities, he has no option but to make himself a tool – wittingly or unwittingly.

== Production history ==
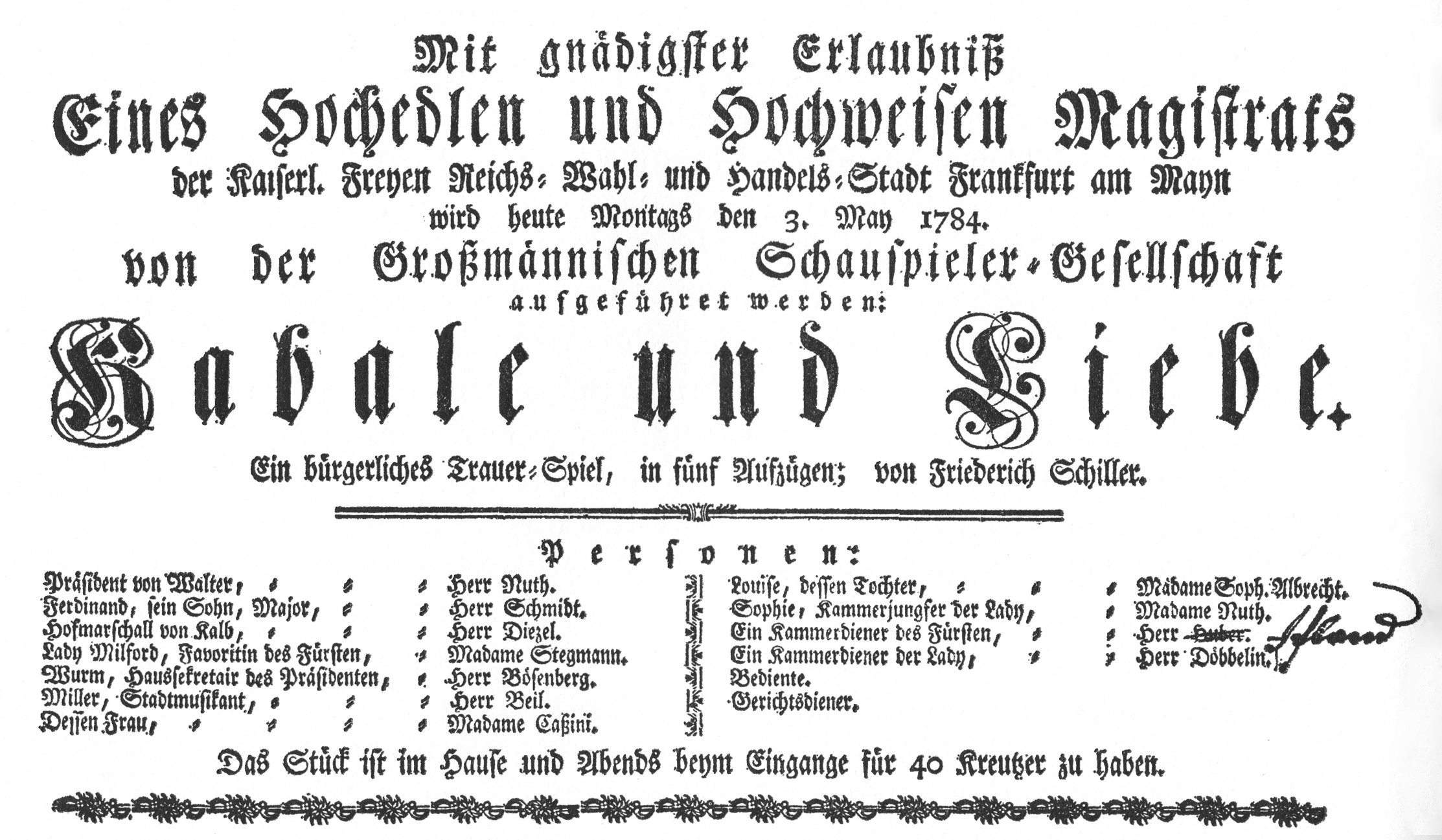
Playbill for the second performance on 3 May 1784 in Frankfurt, August Wilhelm Iffland in the role of the valet

Schiller began the play in 1782. It originally had the working title Luise Millerin, which was changed to Kabale und Liebe on the suggestion of the actor August Wilhelm Iffland. It was first performed on 13 April 1784 at the Schauspiel Frankfurt, and then two days later on 15 April 1784 in the Mannheim National Theatre in Schiller's presence. The play was a massive success, running in Berlin, and banned in Stuttgart. It appeared in print in 1784 in Mannheim. It was performed at the Donmar Warehouse theatre, London, in 2011. In 2018, the play was adapted by Russia's Maly Drama Theatre and performed at the Brooklyn Academy of Music.

== Adaptations ==
=== Translations ===
The first English translation was released in 1795, and a French version followed in 1799. Modern English translations include Love and Politics by Christopher Webber (London, Riverside Studios, 1989), Intrigue/Love by Daniel Millar and Mark Leipacher (London, Southwark Playhouse, 2010) and Luise Miller by Mike Poulton (London, Donmar Warehouse, 8 June to 30 July 2011)

=== Opera ===
Giuseppe Verdi's opera based on the play was entitled Luisa Miller. The librettist was Salvadore Cammarano, and the premiere took place in Naples on 8 December 1849. Another opera, Gottfried von Einem's Opus 44, used Schiller's original title Kabale und Liebe was set to a libretto by Boris Blacher and Lotte Ingrisch and premiered on 17 December 1976.

=== TV and film ===
Country	Year	Title	Director
Germany	1913	Kabale und Liebe	Friedrich Feher
Germany	1922	Luise Millerin / "Kabale und Liebe"	Carl Froelich
West Germany	1955	Kabale und Liebe	Curt Goetz-Pflug
West Germany	1959	Kabale und Liebe (TV)	Harald Braun
East Germany	1959	Kabale und Liebe	Martin Hellberg
Austria	1965	Kabale und Liebe (TV)	Erich Neuberg
West Germany	1967	Kabale und Liebe (TV)	Gerhard Klingenberg
West Germany	1980	Kabale und Liebe	Heinz Schirk
East Germany	1982	Kabale und Liebe (TV)	Piet Drescher
Germany	2001	Kabale und Liebe	Achim Scherf
Germany	2005	Kabale und Liebe (TV)	Leander Haußmann
Germany	2009	Kabale und Liebe (Film, TV)	Andreas Kriegenburg
