= Paul Landois =

French playwright

Paul Landois was an 18th-century French playwright.

There is no information on the life of this inventor of an intermediary theatrical genre which he called bourgeois tragedy and which was adopted by La Chaussée, Diderot, Beaumarchais, and finally by the playwrights of the 19th century.

He composed some plays, including one entitled Silvie, in one act and in prose, played by the comedians of the Comédie-Française in 1741.

He also is the author, under the signature "R", of more than 110 articles of the Encyclopédie by Diderot and D’Alembert, including those related to "peinture", "sculpture" and "gravure".

== Sources ==
- Pierre Larousse, Grand Dictionnaire universel du XIXe, vol. 10, Paris, Administration du grand Dictionnaire universel, (p. 140).

== Bibliography ==
- „Landois, Paul“, in Frank Arthur Kafker, The encyclopedists as individuals: a biographical dictionary of the authors of the Encyclopédie, Oxford 1988, ISBN 0-7294-0368-8, (p. 189).
- Henry Carrington Lancaster (ed.): The First French ‘tragédie bourgeoise’: Silvie, attributed to Paul Landois, Baltimore 1954 (edition with a short introduction by the publisher).
