= Versuch einer kritischen Dichtkunst für die Deutschen =

Versuch einer kritischen Dichtkunst für die Deutschen (English: Essay on a German Critical Poetic Theory) is a 1730 treatise by the German philosopher, author, and Age of Enlightenment figure Johann Christoph Gottsched. The treatise was the first effort to codify into German poetry the standards advocated for by Nicolas Boileau-Despréaux, who in turn was inspired by Horace. Boileau was an eminent force for classicism; Gottsched served a similar role for German verse.
