= Luise Gottsched =

German poet, playwright, essayist and translator

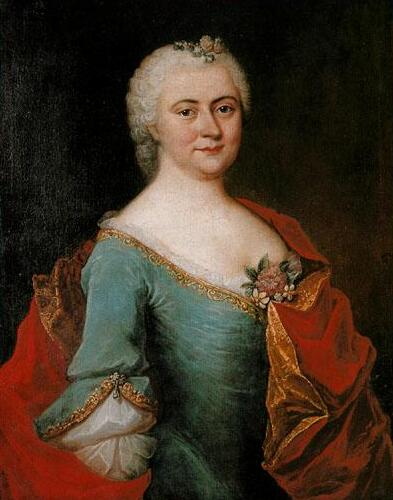
- Portrait by Elias Gottlob Haussmann, c. 1750
- Born: Luise Adelgunde Victorie Kulmus; 11 April 1713; Danzig (Gdańsk), Polish–Lithuanian Commonwealth
- Died: 26 June 1762 (aged 49); Leipzig, Electorate of Saxony, Holy Roman Empire
- Spouse: Johann Christoph Gottsched

Luise Adelgunde Victorie Gottsched (née Kulmus; 11 April 1713 – 26 June 1762) was a German poet, playwright, essayist, and translator, and is often considered one of the founders of modern German theatrical comedy.

== Biography ==
She was born in Danzig (modern-day Gdańsk) in the Polish–Lithuanian Commonwealth. She became acquainted with her husband, the poet and author Johann Christoph Gottsched, when she sent him some of her own works. He apparently was impressed, and a long correspondence eventually led to marriage. After marriage, Luise continued to write and publish, and was also her husband's faithful helper in his literary labours. Her uncle was the anatomist Johann Adam Kulmus.

== Works ==
She wrote several popular comedies, including Das Testament, and translated The Spectator (9 volumes, 1739–1743), Alexander Pope's Rape of the Lock (1744) and other English and French works. After her death her husband edited her Sämtliche kleinere Gedichte with a memoir (1763).

== Sources ==
- Gilman, D. C.; Peck, H. T.; Colby, F. M., eds. (1905). "Gottsched, Johann Christoph" . New International Encyclopedia (1st ed.). New York: Dodd, Mead.
