= Emilia Galotti =

1772 play by Gotthold Ephraim Lessing

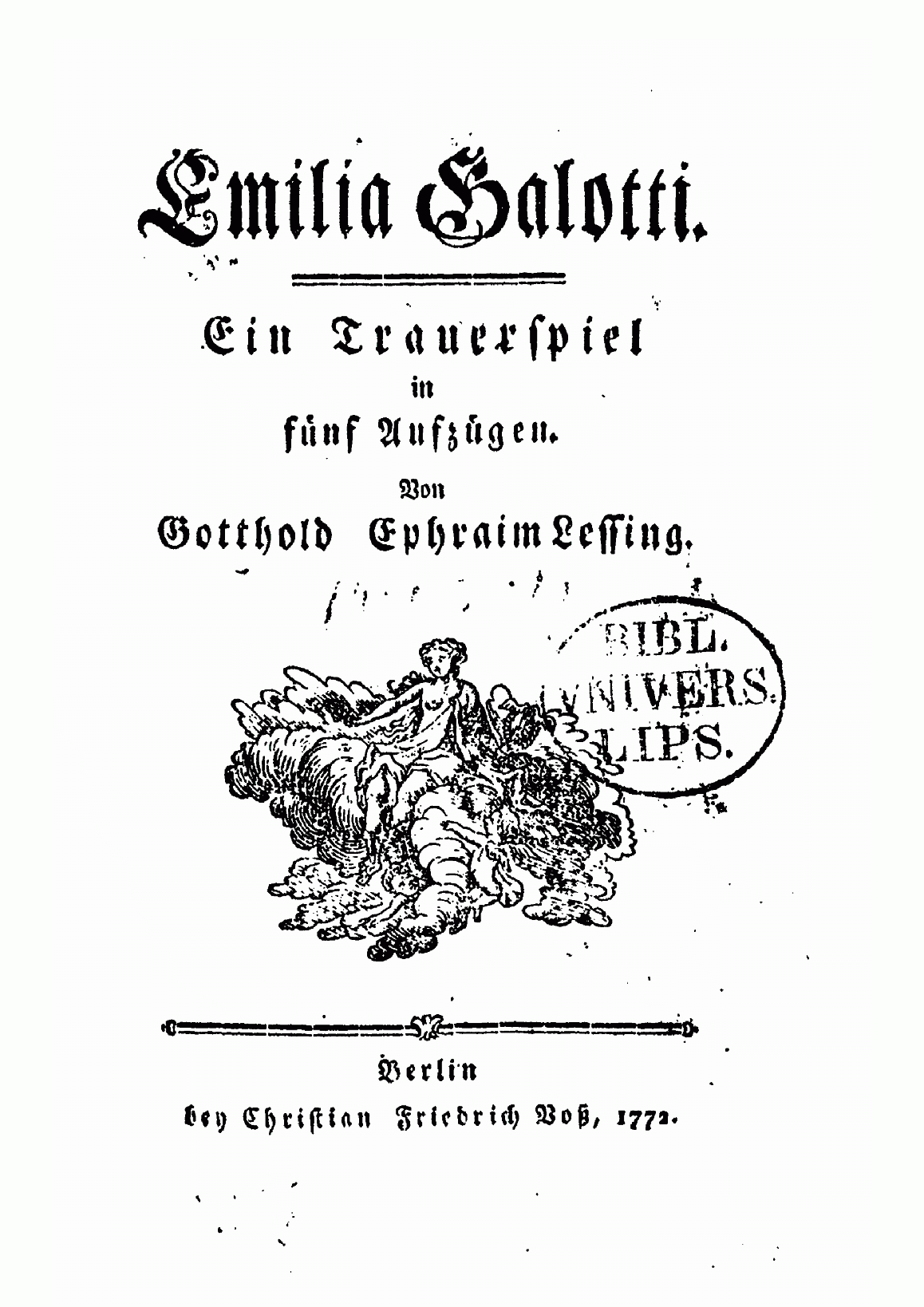
- Copy of the play from 1772
- Written by: Gotthold Ephraim Lessing
- Based on: The myth of Verginia by Livius
- Date premiered: 13 March 1772
- Original language: German
- Genre: Bourgeois tragedy

Emilia Galotti (German pronunciation: [eˈmiːli̯a ɡaˈlɔti]) is a play in five acts by Gotthold Ephraim Lessing (1729–1781), which premiered on 8 March 1772 in Brunswick (Braunschweig in German). The work is an example of German bürgerliches Trauerspiel (bourgeois tragedy).

The story concerns a virtuous young woman of the bourgeoisie; the arbitrary style of rule by the aristocracy is placed in stark contrast to the enlightened morality of her class. Feudal ideas of love and marriage thus come into conflict with the growing tendency to marry for love, rather than family tradition and power. It was made into a film in 1958.

== Characters ==
- Emilia Galotti
- Odoardo Galotti, father of Emilia Galotti
- Claudia Galotti, mother of Emilia Galotti
- Pirro, servant of the Galottis
- Hettore Gonzaga, prince of Guastalla
- Marinelli, chamberlain of the prince
- Camillo Rota, one of the prince's advisors
- Conti, a painter
- Count Appiani
- Countess Orsina
- Angelo, a robber
- Battista, servant of Gonzaga

== Plot ==
In Italy, The absolutist prince of Guastalla, Hettore Gonzaga, becomes obsessed with the idea of making Emilia, a young bourgeoise woman, his lover after their first meeting. He thus gives his conniving Chamberlain, Marinelli, the right to do anything in his power to delay the previously arranged marriage between Emilia and Count Appiani. Marinelli hires criminals who soon murder the count on his way to the wedding. Emilia is quickly brought to safety in the prince's nearby summer residence. Unlike her mother Claudia, Emilia does not recognise the true implications of the scheme. Countess Orsina, the prince's former mistress, then arrives at the residence. Out of frustration over her harsh rejection by the prince, she attempts to convince Odoardo, Emilia's father, to avenge Count Appiani by stabbing the prince to death. Odoardo hesitates to agree to this proposal and decides to leave revenge in the hands of God. Emilia, who remains under the protection of the prince due to another intrigue on Marinelli's behalf, asks her father to kill her in order to maintain her dignity in light of the prince's exertions to seduce her. The father agrees and stabs her but is immediately appalled by his deed. The prince decides that Marinelli is responsible for the catastrophe and bans him from his court. Emilia's father recognises God as the absolute authority.

== Reception ==
=== Contemporary and early criticism ===
Music historian Charles Burney attended a 1772 performance of Emilia Galotti in Vienna. "I should suppose this play to have been well acted; there were energy and passion, and many speeches were much applauded." But the Englishman was surprised by the "impious oaths and execrations" of the script: "The interlocutors curse, swear, and call names, in a gross and outrageous manner. I know not, perhaps, the exact ideas annexed by the Germans to the following expressions, of "Mein Gott," "Gott verdamm ihn," etc., but they shocked my ears very frequently." Still, Burney concluded: "There is an original wildness in the conduct and sentiments of this piece which renders it very interesting."

Arthur Schopenhauer, in his The Art of Literature, criticised Emilia Galotti as a play with a "positively revolting" end.

=== Later reception and recent productions ===
The Britannica describes the play as follows: "Written in intense and incisive prose, this brilliantly constructed play deals with a conflict of conscience at the court of an Italian prince."

In a review of a 2016 production, Michael Billington, writing for The Guardian, found: "Lessing’s play is normally classified as an early example of middle-class tragedy. In a way the label is misleading, since much of the focus is on the lust of an Italian prince who has fallen in love with a bourgeois beauty, and on the machinations of his chamberlain who stages a bungled abduction. While the play is clearly an attack on unfettered princely power, it also presents an intriguingly ambivalent heroine."

== In literature ==
Johann Wolfgang von Goethe refers to Emilia Galotti in his novel The Sorrows of Young Werther, which was published in 1774: "They had laid Werther on the bed ... his death was momently expected. ... Emilia Galotti lay open upon his bureau."

Friedrich Nietzsche refers to dialogue from Emilia Galotti in his book Beyond Good and Evil, published in 1886: "What if in the realm of genius, the 'Raphael without hands' (taking that phrase in the broadest sense) is not the exception but, perhaps, the rule?"
