= Elias Gottlob Haussmann =

German painter (1695–1774)

- Born: 1695; Gera, Imperial County of Reuss, Holy Roman Empire
- Died: 11 April 1774 (aged 78–79); Leipzig, Electorate of Saxony, Holy Roman Empire
- Known for: Portrait painting
- Movement: Baroque

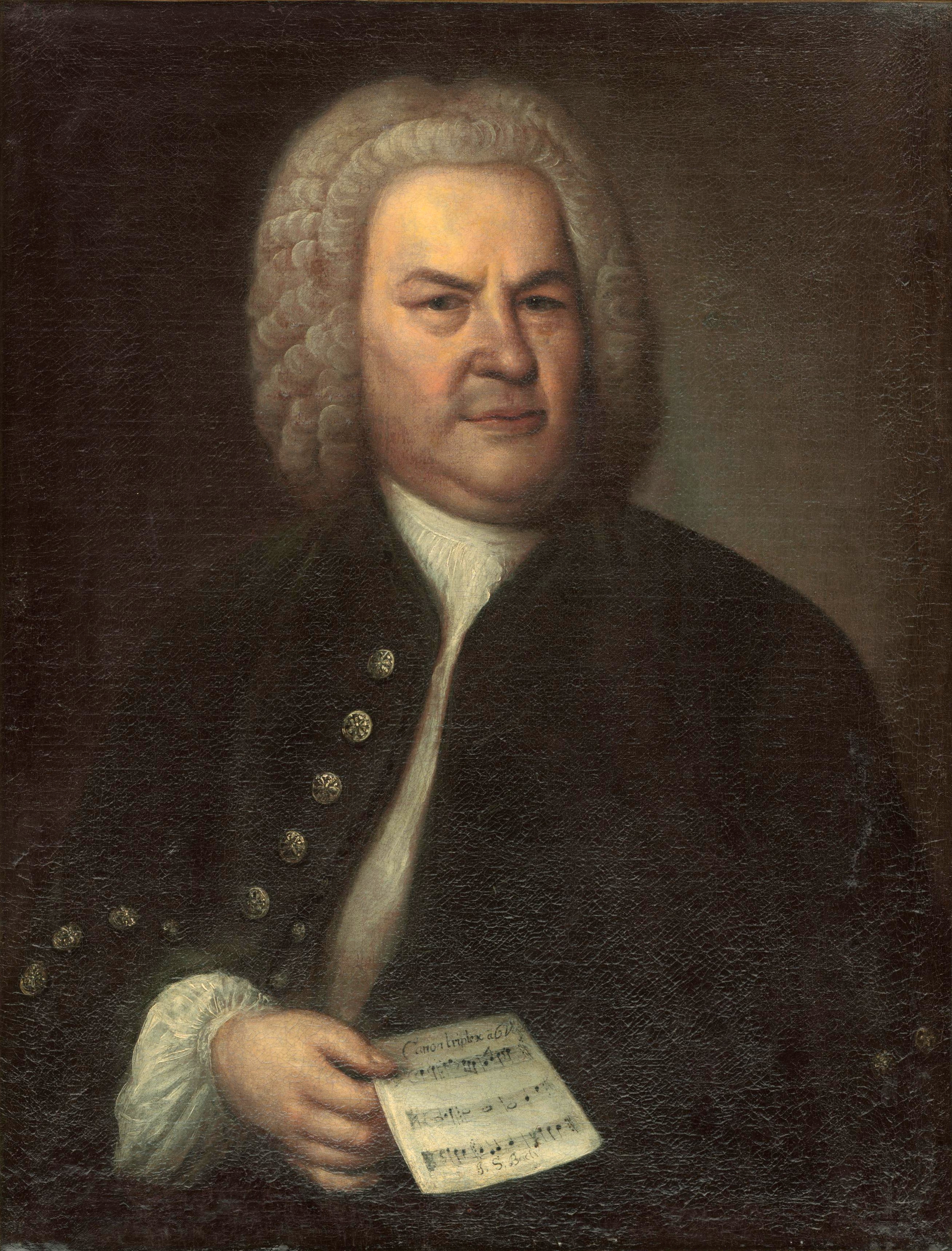
J. S. Bach holding his Riddle Canon, BWV 1076 (1746)

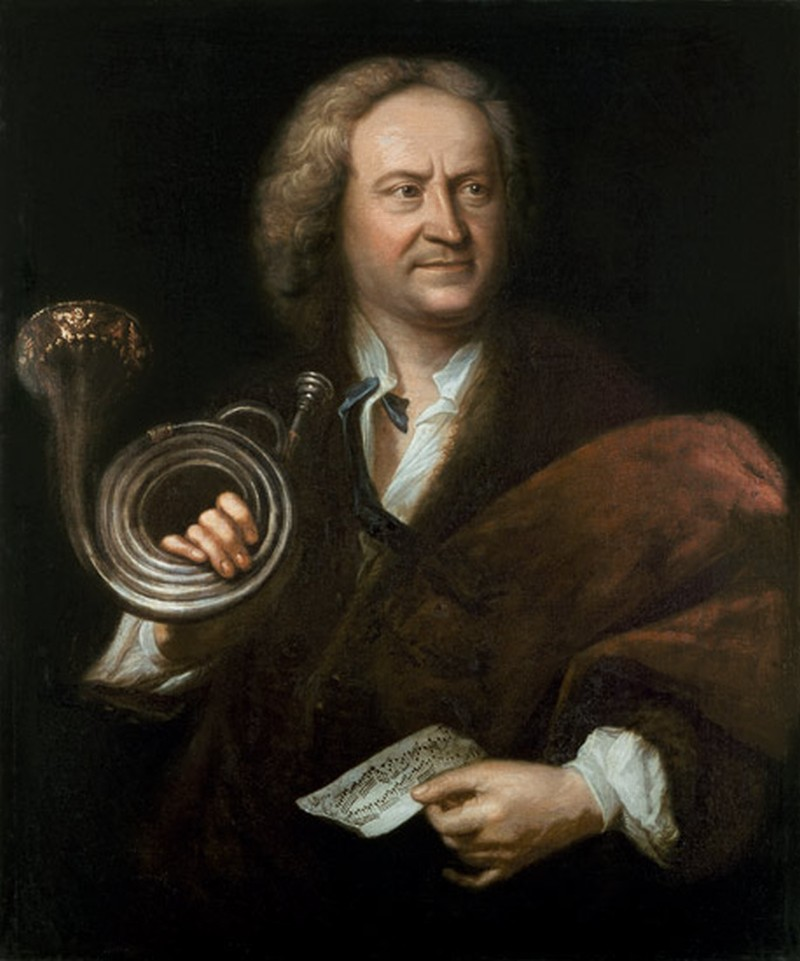
Gottfried Reiche, oil painting by Haussmann, 1726–27

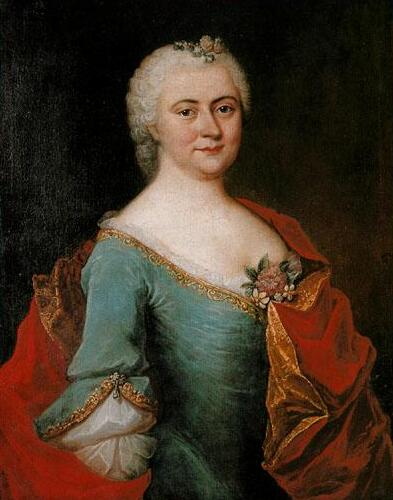
Luise Gottsched, oil painting by Haussmann c. 1750

Elias Gottlob Haussmann (also Haußmann or Hausmann) (1695 – 11 April 1774) was a German painter in the late Baroque era. Haussmann served as court painter at Dresden, and from 1720, as the official portraitist at Leipzig. He is mostly known for his portrait of Johann Sebastian Bach which was painted in 1746.

== Life ==
Haussmann was born in Gera. He was at first a pupil of his father, Elias Haußmann (1663–1733), who was the Landgrave of Hesse's court painter. Haussmann was in the royal Hessian service, as he was mentioned in a September 1717 letter of recommendation from Landgrave Ernst Ludwig of Hesse-Darmstadt as "Our court painter's son".

The Landgrave allowed him a study trip through Germany, where he met portraitist Francesco Carlo Rusca at Lugano. Haussmann also met the Dresden court painter Ádám Mányoki, who wrote favorably of him.

From 1720, Haussmann was the official portrait painter of the city of Leipzig, but left the city in 1722, probably because of differences with the Malerinnung (painters' guild) of Leipzig. Haussman and the guild quarrelled in 1729 and 1742 because he refused to become a burgher or to come to agreements with the guild. These disputes are also accepted as a reason that Mányoki revoked his recommendation.

In 1723, Haussmann was appointed court painter to Augustus II the Strong, King of Poland and Elector of Saxony. In 1725, he returned to Leipzig. In 1726, he took over the clientele of his predecessor, beginning with a portrait of the merchant Johann Heinrich Linke. In the 1760s, he and his school were replaced by Ernst Gottlob and Anton Graff. Haussmann was also a long-time painter of the Protestant clergy.

== Works ==
The City Historical Museum of Leipzig in the Old Town Hall, where the Bach portrait hangs, also has several other oil paintings by Haussmann and a variety of his copperplate engravings. Most Haussmann paintings can easily be attributed – he regularly signed his works on the back with his name and the date.

Haussmann's early portraits, like that of Gottfried Reiches, display individual composition, technical careful execution, a high level of detail, and realistic emotional expressions. Many later portraits on the other hand, possess typical characteristics of serial images. Especially in the years after 1760, they use the same measurements and often show the subjects in the same attitude. Often there are identical clothes in the same colors within a series of portraits of rather insignificant officials. Georg Müller writes of an "image factory".

Engravings made by others were enhanced with titles, career and personal data.

Haussmann's oil paintings and the larger number of etchings show a cross section of the leading layer of the bourgeoisie of Leipzig from the fields of politics, administration, judiciary, the church, business (especially trade and crafts), science and art. Examples include:

- Mayor Gottfried Wilhelm Küster
- Councillor and builder Kaspar Richter
- Councillor and city judge Johann Jacob Mascov
- Pastor Gottlieb Gauditz
- Archdeacon Christian Weiß
- Councillor and merchant Johann Zacharias Richter
- Merchant Johann Heinrich Linke
- Jurist Christian Gottfried Moerlin
- University professor August Friedrich Müller
- Kapellmeister and Thomaskantor Johann Sebastian Bach
- Senior municipal musician Gottfried Reiche
- Writer Luise Gottsched
