= Joseph R. Roques =

French botanist and physician (1772–1850)

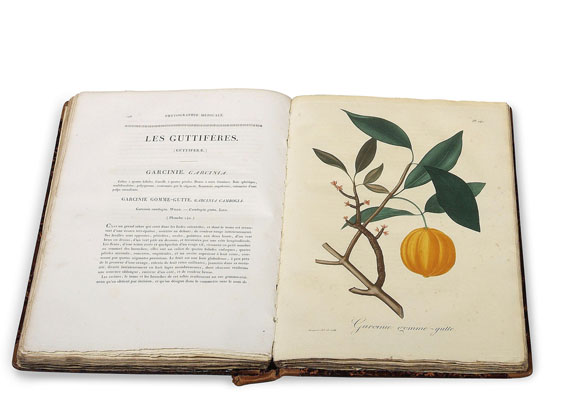
Phytographie médicale

Joseph R. Roques (1772–1850), was a French botanist and medical doctor noted for his materia medica work Phytographie médicale, histoire des substances héroiques et des poisons tirés du règne végétal ("Medical phytography, a history of powerful substances and poisons from the plant kingdom"). He was a student at the University of Montpellier, enrolling in the Faculty of Medicine. He subsequently moved to Paris, becoming eminent as a botanist. The plates of his Phytographie médicale were drawn and engraved by Edouard Hocquart.
