= Johann Joachim Schwabe =

German academic, poet and translator

Johann Joachim Schwabe (29 September 1714 – 12 April 1784) was a German academic, poet and translator.
