= Loss of books in late antiquity =

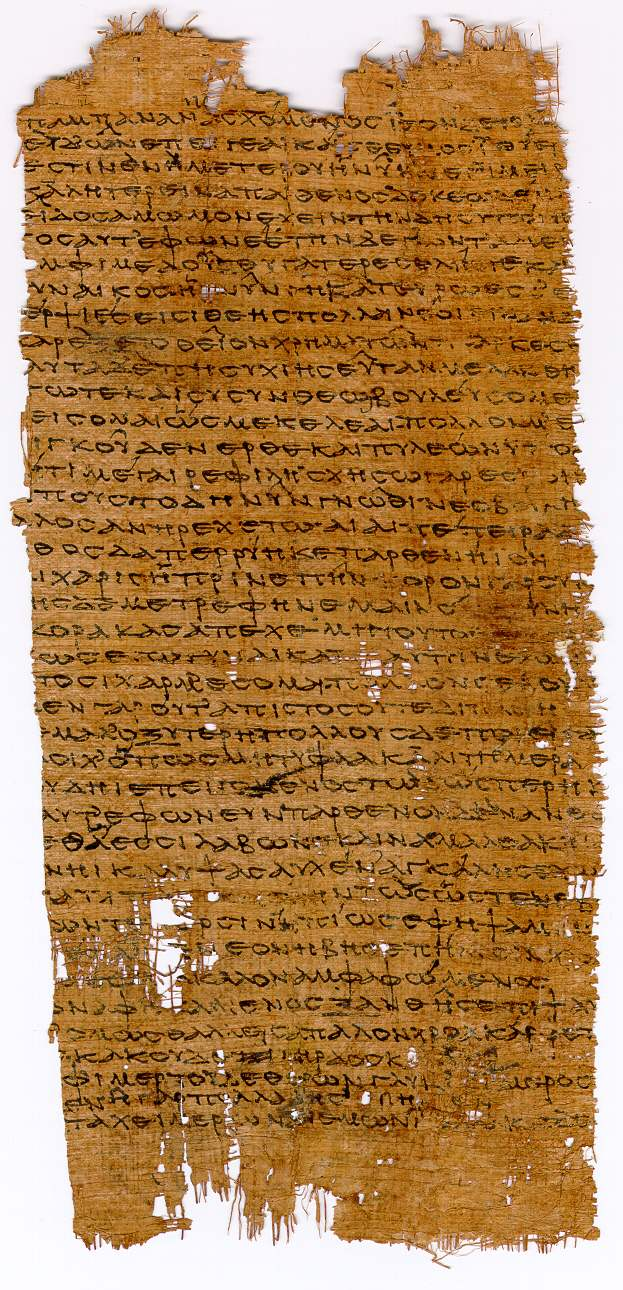
Fragment of Archilochus, Papyrus Collection Cologne 7511 recto (verso blank)

Much of the cultural heritage of classical antiquity was lost as a consequence of the loss of books in late antiquity, which in the west was the period from the late third to late sixth century CE. A major part of antique Greek and Latin literature was lost during this period, and only a small number of works remained extant to the Early Modern Age. Most of these works are available in Medieval copies, while very few original documents of antiquity were known preserved, until recent discoveries of papyri and parchments. Discoveries of palimpsest copies of significant classical texts have also been particularly studied since the 19th century.

Among the causes of the loss of books in late antiquity, there is evidence for systematic annihilation of Christian scriptures in the persecution of Christians, as well as pagan scriptures in the course of the Christianization of the Roman Empire. Changes in the media were a further barrier to the transmission of classical texts. The tradition of works came to an end when they were not transcribed onto the new media, and were thus dropped out of the canon.

In the Latin West, an elite of the wealthy and educated preserved a subset of the literary heritage of antiquity. This circle included Cassiodorus, who founded the monastic book production of the Middle Ages with Vivarium.
