= Bourgeois tragedy =

Form of tragedy

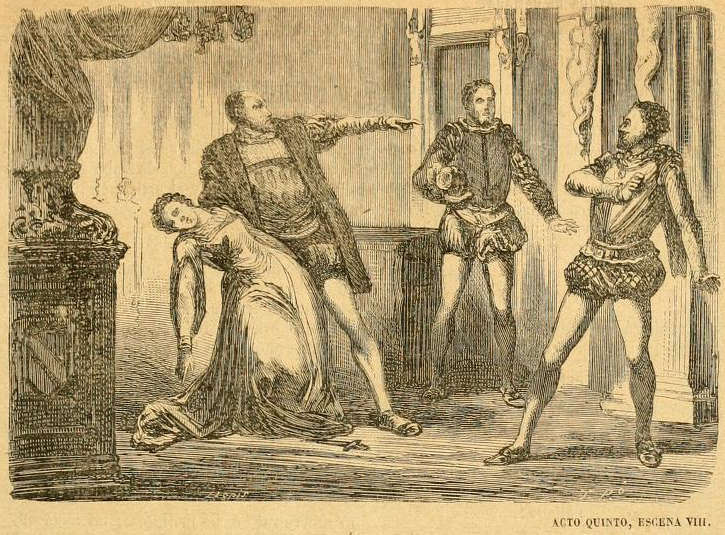
EmiliaGalotti

Bourgeois tragedy (German: Bürgerliches Trauerspiel) is a form of tragedy that developed in 18th-century Europe. It is a fruit of the enlightenment and the emergence of the bourgeois class and its ideals. It is characterized by the fact that its protagonists are ordinary citizens.

== In England and France ==
There are a few examples of tragic plays with middle-class protagonists from 17th century England (see domestic tragedy), but only in the 18th century did the general attitude change. The first true bourgeois tragedy was an English play: George Lillo's The London Merchant; or, the History of George Barnwell, which was first performed in 1731.

In France, the first tragédie bourgeoise was Sylvie by Paul Landois, which came out in 1741. Years later came two plays by Denis Diderot: Le fils naturel was first staged in 1757 and Le père de famille in the following year; while these plays were not strictly tragedies, they treat bourgeois lives in a serious manner atypical of contemporary comedy and provided models for more genuinely tragic works.

== Heroes in classical tragedy ==
While ordinary people had always been the subject of comedies, classical and neo-classical theorists asserted that tragic heroes should always be men of noble rank. Aristotle articulates this idea in The Poetics and it figures prominently in later ancient writings on drama and poetics.

Sixteenth- and seventeenth-century critics, including the influential German Martin Opitz, perpetuated the theory that only members of the higher classes were capable of suffering harm serious enough to deserve dramatic reenactment. This rule was followed throughout Europe for centuries: usually, princes and members of the nobility, such as Andreas Gryphius' Carolus Stuardus (i.e. King Charles I of England), Jean Racine's Phèdre (the wife of Theseus, a mythical king of Athens) or William Shakespeare's King Lear, serve as tragic protagonists.

== In Germany ==
In Germany, where the new genre was called Bürgerliches Trauerspiel, it was especially successful. Usually, Gotthold Ephraim Lessing's play Miss Sara Sampson, which was first produced in 1755, is said to be the earliest Bürgerliches Trauerspiel in Germany. However, Christian Leberecht Martini's drama Rhynsolt und Sapphira is slightly older.

Lessing's Emilia Galotti of 1771 is a classic example of the German Bürgerliches Trauerspiel. Lessing also offered a thorough theoretic justification for his disregard of the old rules in his Hamburgische Dramaturgie. Other important examples of German Bürgerliche Trauerspiele are Die Soldaten by Jakob Michael Reinhold Lenz (1776) and Friedrich Schiller's Kabale und Liebe (1784).

== General characteristics ==
Bourgeois tragedies tend to propagate the values of the bourgeois class to which their heroes belong. Their ideal is the virtuous citizen, who is excluded from state affairs and whose intentions are focused on his private life and the life of his family. Values like virtue, humanity, individuality and true feelings are cherished in bourgeois tragedies.
