= Johann Jakob Breitinger (philologist) =

Swiss philologist and author

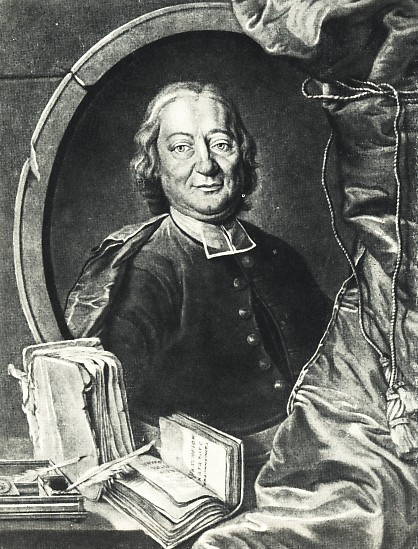
Johann Jakob Breitinger, in an engraving after Johann Kaspar Füssli

Johann Jakob Breitinger (1 March 1701, Zürich – 14 December 1776, Zürich) was a Swiss philologist and author.

== Life ==
Breitinger studied theology and philology and first earned recognition from 1730 through a new edition of the Septuaginta. From 1731 he worked as Professor of Hebrew and later of Greek in the gymnasium in Zürich. Breitinger was however best known for his collaborations with his friend Johann Jakob Bodmer. In their joint work it cannot always to be distinguished, from whom most of the suggestions came. The main part of the historical collection Thesaurus Historicae Helveticae (1735) may be attributed to Breitinger.

Breitinger's principal work Critische Dichtkunst (1740) was a rejection of the traditional poetic principle of imitation of nature in favor of the principle of creative imagination; it had a big influence on German literary theory and the burgeoning genius cult. In this context was also the literary-historically significant dispute of Bodmer and Breitinger with Johann Christoph Gottsched.

== Works ==
- Kritische Abhandlung von der Natur, den Absichten und dem Gebrauche der Gleichnisse, 1740
- Critische Dichtkunst, 1740
- Verteidigung der schweizerischen Muse Herrn D. A. Hallers, 1744
