= Johann Jakob Bodmer =

Swiss author, academic, critic and poet

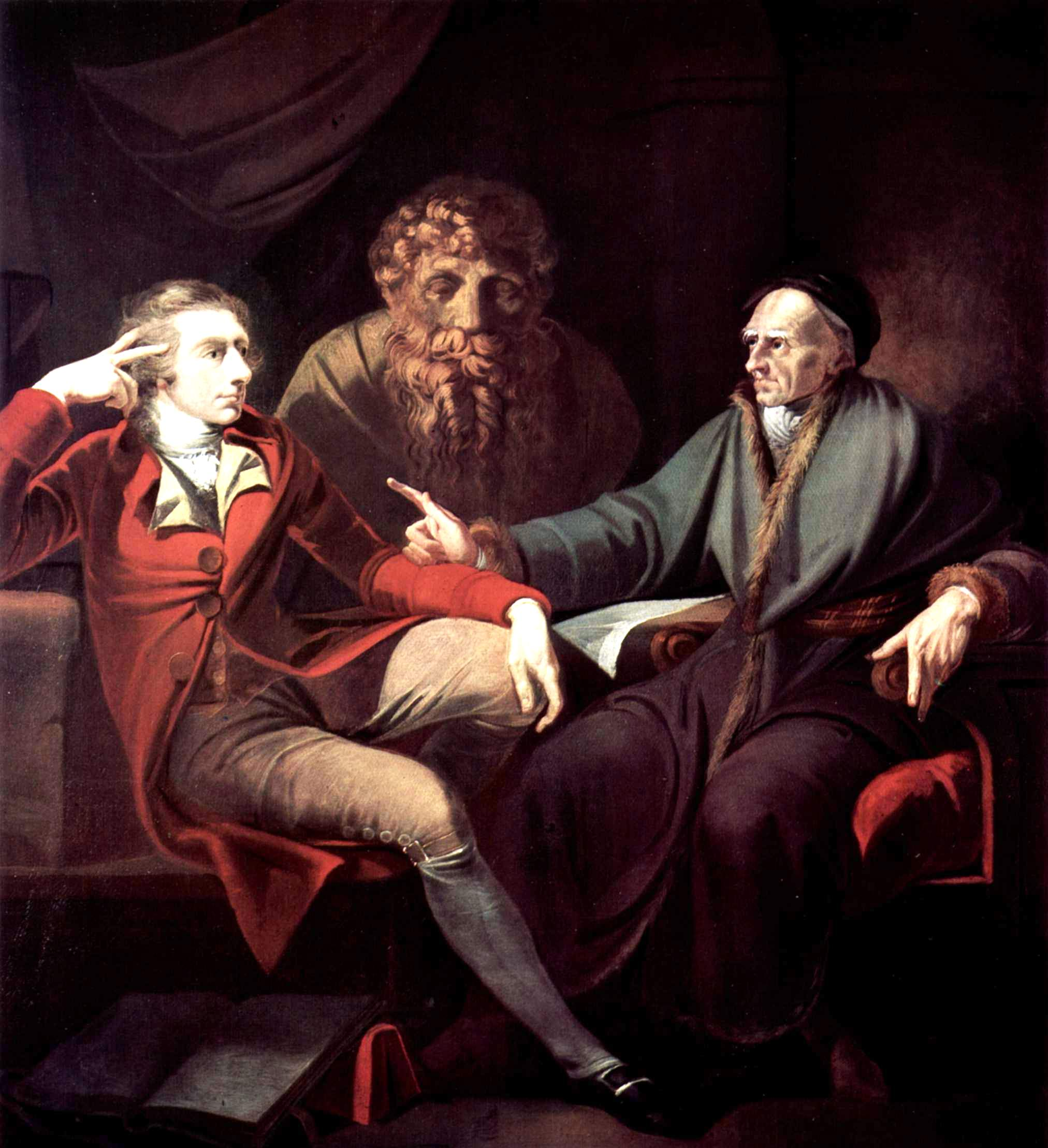
Henry Fuseli talking to Bodmer, 1778–1781.

Johann Jakob Bodmer (19 July 1698 – 2 January 1783) was a Swiss author, academic, critic and poet.

== Life ==
Born at Greifensee, near Zürich, and first studying theology and then trying a commercial career, he finally found his vocation in letters. In 1725 he was appointed professor of Helvetian history at the Carolinum academy in Zürich, a chair which he held for half a century, and in 1735 became a member of the Cantonal Council. He died at Zürich in 1783.

== Work ==
His major writings are the treatises Von dem Wunderbaren in der Poesie (1740; this and following years link to corresponding "[year] in poetry" articles) and Kritische Betrachtungen über die poetischen Gemählde der Dichter (1741), in which he pleaded for the freedom of the imagination from the restriction imposed upon it by French classicism. Bodmer's epics Die Sundflutz and Noah (both 1751) are imitations of Klopstock's Messias, and his plays are entirely deficient in dramatic qualities. He also issued editions of the Minnesingers and part of the Nibelungenlied.

He published (1721–1723), in conjunction with Johann Jakob Breitinger and others, Die Discourse der Mahlern, a weekly journal after the model of The Spectator. In it, German poetry was severely criticised for its servility to French models. Through his prose translation of Milton's Paradise Lost (Johann Miltons Episches Gedichte von dem Verlohrnen Paradiese, 1742), he tried to make English literature accessible in Germany.

He formed a German literary school in opposition to Johann Christoph Gottsched of Leipzig, with whom he carried on a prolonged controversy.
