= List of numismatic associations =

Numismatic associations bring together groups of numismatists. They may be commercial, hobby or professional. Membership is sometimes by election.

== List of international numismatic associations ==
- Federation of European Numismatic Associations (FENAP)
- Fédération Internationale de la Médaille d'Art (FIDEM)
- International Association of Professional Numismatists (IAPN)
- International Bank Note Society (IBNS)
- International Numismatic Council (INC)

== List of numismatic associations (by country) ==
=== Armenia ===
- Armenian Numismatic Society
- Armenian Numismatic Research Organization

=== Australia ===
- ACT and District Coin Club
- Australian Numismatic Society
- Australian Numismatic Society NSW
- Australian Numismatic Society Queensland Branch
- Australian Society for Ancient Numismatics
- Bairnsdale and District Stamp and Coin Club
- Bathurst Stamp, Coin, Collectables and Lapidary Club
- Bendigo Coin & Collectables Club Inc
- Coffs Harbour Stamp and Coin Club
- Geelong Numismatic Society
- Gold Coast Coin Club
- IBNS (Melbourne Chapter)
- IBNS (Perth Chapter)
- IBNS (Sydney Chapter)
- Illawarra Numismatic Association
- Maitland and District Coin Club
- Melbourne Numismatic Society Inc
- Metropolitan Coin Club of Sydney
- Morwell Numismatic Society
- Mudgee Coin, Note & Stamp Club Inc.
- Nambucca Heads Stamp and Coin Club
- Newcastle Numismatic Society
- Numismatic Association of Australia
- Orange Coin and Stamp Club Inc
- Numismatic Association of Victoria Inc
- Numismatic Society of South Australia Inc
- Queensland Numismatic Society Inc
- Perth Numismatic Society Inc
- Redcliffe Coin and Phonecard Club
- Redland Bay Coin and Stamp Club
- Rockhampton Coin Club
- Sale & District Stamp & Coin Club
- Sapphire Coast Stamp & Coin Club
- South-West Coin Club
- Tasmanian Numismatic Society Inc – NAA
- Western Australian Roman Coin Study Group
- Yorke Peninsula Collectables Club

=== Austria ===
- Verband Österreichischer Münzenhändler

=== Belgium ===
- Association Belgo-Luxembourgeoise de Numismates Professionnels
- Royal Numismatic Society of Belgium (Société Royale de Numismatique de Belgique)

=== Brazil ===
- Sociedade Numismática Brasileira (São Paulo-SP)
- Sociedade Numismática Paranaense (Curitiba-PR)
- Sociedade Numismática Amazonense (Manaus-AM)
- Sociedade Gaúcha de Numismática (Porto Alegre-RS)
- Sociedade Numismática de Joinville (Joinville-SC)
- Associação Mineira de Numismática (Belo Horizonte-MG)
- Associação Numismática de Brasília (Brasília-DF)
- Clube Numismático do Estado do Rio de Janeiro (Rio de Janeiro-RJ)
- Sociedade Goiana de Numismática (Goiânia-GO)

=== Canada ===
- Canadian Association of Numismatic Dealers (CAND)
- Canadian Association of Token Collectors (CATC)
- Canadian Association of Wooden Money Collectors (CAWMC)
- Canadian Errors and Varieties Numismatic Association (CEVNA)
- Canadian Paper Money Society (CPMS)
- Canadian Tire Coupon Collectors Club
- Classical & Medieval Numismatic Society (CMNS)
- Medallic Art Society of Canada (MASC)
- Newfoundland Numismatic Enthusiasts (NNE)
- North Shore Numismatic Society
- Numismatic Network Canada (NNC)
- Ontario Numismatic Association (ONA)
- Royal Canadian Numismatic Association (RCNA)
- Société Numismatique de Québec (SNQ)

=== China ===
- China Numismatic Society (CNA)
- Hong Kong Numismatic Society
- Hong Kong Stamp and Coin Dealers Association
- Shanghai Numismatic Society

=== Denmark ===
- Danish Numismatic Society
- Monthandler-Sammenslutningen af 1975

=== Finland ===
- Finnish Numismatic Society

=== France ===
- Société Française de Numismatique (French Numismatic Society)
- CGB Numismatique
- Groupe numismatique de Provence
- Société Française des Monnaies
- Société française de numismatique
- Syndicat National des Experts Numismates et Numismates Professionnels (SNENNP)

=== Germany ===
- Numismatische Gesellschaft zu Berlin (Berlin Numismatic Society)
- Berufsverband des Deutschen Münzenfachhandels (Professional Association of the German Coin Trade)
- Gesellschaft für Internationale Geldgeschichte (GIG) (Society for International Monetary History)
- Verband der Deutschen Münzenhändler (Association of German Coin Dealers)

=== Greece ===
- Hellenic Numismatic Society

=== India ===
- The Numismatic Society of India
- South Indian Numismatic Society

=== Israel ===
- Israel Numismatic Society

=== Italy ===
- Federazione Italiana dei Circoli Numismatici (FICN)
- umismatici Italiani Professionisti (NIP)
- Società Numismatica Italiana (SNI - Italian Numismatic Society)

=== Japan ===
- Japanese Numismatic Association (JNA)
- Japan Numismatic Dealers' Association (JNDA)

=== Kuwait ===
- KiSociety

=== Nepal ===
- Nepal Numismatic Society

=== Netherlands ===
- Nederlandse Vereniging van Munthandelaren (NVMH)

=== New Zealand ===
- Numismatic Society of Auckland Inc
- Royal Numismatic Society of New Zealand (RNSNZ)
- Tauranga Numismatic Society
- Waikato Numismatic Society
- Wanganui Numismatic Society

=== Poland ===
- Polish Numismatic Society

=== Slovakia ===
- Slovak numismatic association by Slovak academy of Sciences

=== Spain ===
- Asociacion Espanola de Numismaticos Profesionales

=== Sweden ===
- Sveriges Mynthandlares Förening

=== Switzerland ===
- Schweizerische Numismatische Gesellschaft/Société Suisse de Numismatique/Società Svizzera di Numismatica/Swiss Numismatic Society
- Verband Schweizer Berufsnumismatiker

=== Turkiye ===
- Turkish Numismatic Society

=== United Kingdom ===
The British Association of Numismatic Societies (BANS) maintains a list of affiliated societies.

- Banbury & District Numismatic Society
- Bathe & Bristol Numismatic Society
- Bexley Coin Club
- Birmingham Numismatic Society
- British Numismatic Society (BNS)
- British Numismatic Trade Association (BNTA)
- Cambridgeshire Numismatic Society
- Crawley Coin and Collectors Club
- Crewe and District Coin and Medal Society
- Devonshire Numismatic Society
- Devon & Exeter Numismatic Society
- Essex Numismatic Society
- Havering Numismatic Society
- Huddersfield Numismatic Society
- Ipswich Numismatic Society
- Lancashire & Cheshire Numismatic Society
- London Numismatic Club
- Norwich Coin & Medal Society
- Numismatic Society of Ireland (Northern Branch)
- Numismatic Society of Nottinghamshire
- Ormskirk & West Lancashire Numismatic Society
- Oxford Numismatic Society
- Oxford University Numismatic Society
- Postal Order Society
- Plymouth Numismatic Society
- Reading Coin Club
- Romsey Numismatic Society
- Royal Numismatic Society (RNS)
- Southampton & District Numismatic Society
- South Manchester Numismatic Society
- South Wales & Monmouthshire Numismatic Society
- Tyneside Numismatic Society
- Wessex Numismatic Society
- Wiltshire Numismatic Society
- Worthing and District Numismatic Society

=== United States ===
- American Israel Numismatic Association
- American Numismatic Association (ANA)
- American Numismatic Society (ANS)
- American Vecturist Association (AVA)
- Ancient Coin Collectors Guild (ACCG)
- Rochester Numismatic Association
