= Václav Špála Gallery =

- Galerie Václava Špály
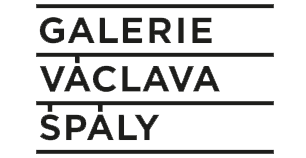

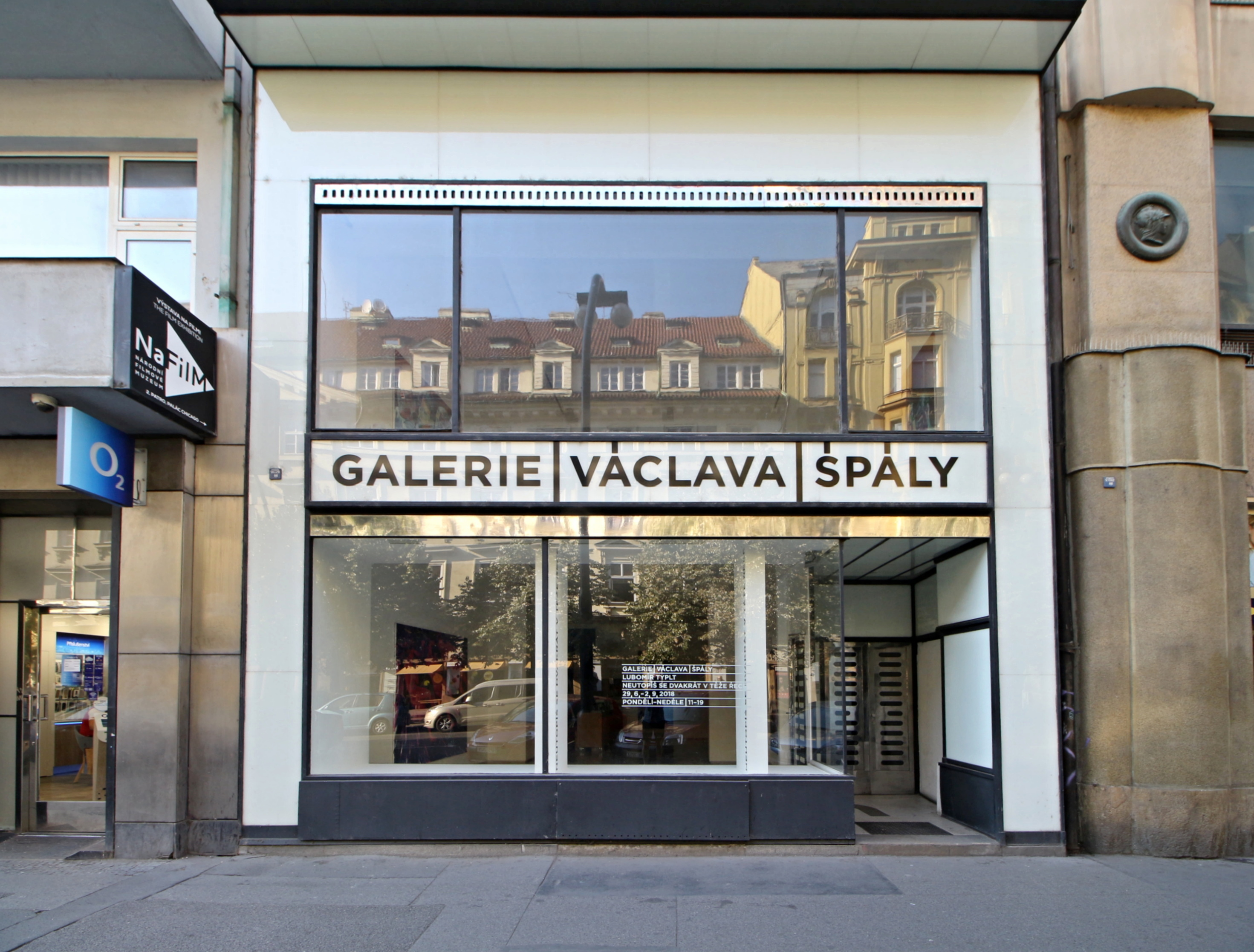
- Václav Špála Gallery, Prague
- Interactive fullscreen map
- Established: 1959; 67 years ago
- Location: Národní 30, Prague 1, Czech Republic, 110 00
- Coordinates: 50.0825°N 14.4203°E
- Website: https://www.galerievaclavaspaly.cz/en

The Václav Špála Gallery (Czech: Galerie Václava Špály) is a Prague gallery of mostly contemporary art. It is located at no. 59/30 Národní třída, in the New Town of Prague (Praha 1 – Nové Město). The gallery holds exhibitions particularly of works by living Czech professional artists of the middle generation who are among the best painters, photographers, and sculptors on the art scene today. The exhibitions regularly alternate between works of painting, photography, and sculpture.

== History ==
From 1916 to 1938, the Rubeš Gallery operated at this address. In the late 1930s, the building was thoroughly remodelled for the Vilímek publishing house and bookshop and the gallery was opened in 1941 as the Galerie Jos. R. Vilímek at no. 30 Viktoriastrasse (as Národní třída was called during the German occupation), Prague. The bookshop, designed by the architect František Zelenka, was built in 1938 on the ground floor and first floor of what had originally been an Art Nouveau building.

From 1949 to 1953 (in the early years of the Communist régime), the building housed the Galerie Práce (Work Gallery), then, from 1953 to 1954, it was the home of the Galerie Kniha (Book Gallery), and, until 1959, the Galerie Českého fondu výtvarných umění (Gallery of the Czech Council for Fine Art).

Beginning in 1959, when the gallery was named after the Czech painter, graphic artist, and illustrator Václav Špála, the exhibition programme was gradually influenced by writers on art such as Eva Petrová, Jiří Šetlík, Ludmila Vachtová, and František Dvořák.

Beginning with an exhibition of works by Zbyněk Sekal in 1965, the gallery flourished under the management of the respected writer on art Jindřich Chalupecký. Under his direction, a whole generation of Czech modern artists showed their works one after another in the gallery, but, in 1969, it also held the only Prague exhibition of works by Marcel Duchamp. The last exhibition organized by Chalupecký consisted of paintings by Vladimír Kopecký in May 1970.

In the 1970s and 1980s, after the defeat of the ‘Prague Spring’ reform movement, Chalupecký was under a state ban and could not publish or be employed in his field. The gallery programme at this time was determined by the Association of Czechoslovak Fine Artists (Svaz československých výtvarných umělců), which was subservient to the régime, and the importance of the gallery declined.

Since the Velvet Revolution of late 1989, the Václav Špála Gallery has again been holding exhibitions curated by respected scholars of art, including Mahulena Nešlehová, Jiří Valoch, Marie Klimešová, Eva Petrová, Josef Kroutvor, Jan Kříž, and Ivo Janoušek, showing works of art by young new artists as well as artists of the 1960s and 1970s generations.

In honour of the golden era of the Václav Špála Gallery, a Jindřich Chalupecký Prize (Cena Jindřicha Chalupeckého) for Czech fine artists aged 35 years or younger was established in 1990. The first winner was Vladimír Kokolia.

In the 1990s, under the direction of Jaroslav Krbůšek, the Václav Špála Gallery became generally known as a forward-looking exhibition space for contemporary Czech art.

Beginning in 2002, the gallery was run by the Czech Art Foundation (Nadace Český fond umění), which began to lease the gallery to anyone who was willing to pay. This resulted in public protests from a range of people in the art world. In 2007, the Borough of Prague 1 published a request for tender to find someone or some institution that would operate the gallery. Semma, an advertising and marketing agency, won the tender, but two years later ceased to rent it, allegedly because of a lack of finances.

In 2010, the Borough of Prague 1 published another request for tender to find someone to operate the Václav Špála Gallery. The winning project was presented by PPF Art, which thus took over the gallery for the next ten years. Together with the Václav Špála Gallery, PPF Art, part of the PPF Group, also manages the Josef Sudek Studio (Ateliér Josef Sudek) on Újezd street, Prague. PPF Art is also the curator of a unique collection of Czech and Slovak photography, the largest part of which is a collection of photographs by the renowned Josef Sudek. PPF Art is also the curator of a collection that constitutes a cross-section of Czech fine art from the late nineteenth century to the present.

== History of exhibitions (a selection) ==
- 1941–44 Jan Štursa, František Tichý, Jan Bauch, Josef Navrátil, František Gross, Karel Černý (drawings), Zdeněk Tůma, Vilém Plocek, Hugo Ullík, Jindřich Wielgus, Max Švabinský, Otakar Mrkvička, Antonín Mánes, František Malý, Ada Novák, Jiří Trnka, Miloslav Holý, Jan Preisler, Karel Svolinský, Josef Mařatka
- 1945 Václav Špála: Sixty Years
- 1945–48 Otakar Mrkvička, Ludmila Jiřincová, Alois Fišárek, Josef Liesler, Miloslav Holý, Cyril Bouda, Karel Svolinský, František Kaván, Czech Modern Sculpture from Gutfreund to Wagner, František Hudeček, František Tichý, Jan Zrzavý, František Gross, From an Excursion of Czech Artists to France, Paris in the Drawings of Karel Černý, Oils and Drawings by Alén Diviš, Zdeněk Sklenář, Vladimír Fuka
- 1949 With Czech Painters on the Threshold of the Five-year Plan
- 1949–53 Art for the Flats of Working People, Emil Filla: Landscapes from the Bohemian Uplands, Vilém Nowak: Paintings, Emil Filla, Otakar Kubín, Josef Liesler: Flowers and Still Lifes, Diệp Minh Châu: Paintings from Vietnam at War
- 1956 Jan Bauch, Jan Zrzavý, František Tichý
- 1957 Otakar Kubín
- 1958 Jan Bauch, Karel Černý, Ladislav Dydek, Pravoslav Kotík
- 1959 Alois Wachsman, František Ronovský
- 1960 Jaroslav Paur, Skupina M57
- 1961 Ladislav Zívr, Tvůrčí skupina Etapa
- 1962 Jan Kodet, Karel Souček, František Gross
- 1964 An Exhibition of Competition Entries for the Decoration of the New Czechoslovak Embassy in Brazil (Jiří John, Čestmír Kafka, Eva Kmentová, Jan Koblasa, Stanislav Kolíbal, Mikuláš Medek, Olbram Zoubek), Křižovatka, Trasa, Jiří Mrázek, Pravoslav Kotík, Vlastimil Beneš, Bohdan Lacina
- 1965 Zbyněk Sekal, Václav Tikal, Jiří Balcar, Václav Kiml, Eva Kmentová, František Pacík, Zdeněk Sklenář, Graphic Art 65, The Object, Austrian Sculptors, František Gross, Ladislav Novák, and Věra Janoušková
- 1966 Picture and Letter, Skupina 4, Jitka Válová, Květa Válová, Otto Herbert Hajek, Tvůrčí skupina Etapa, La figuration narrative: Continual Style, Time Juxtapositions, Cloisonnés and Polyptychs, Itineraries and Metamorphoses, Bohuslav Rynek, Jiří Seifert, Jaroslav Klápště, Radoslav Kutra, Current Trends in Czech Art. Paintings, Sculptures, Prints, Jiří Balcar, Glass, European Art: Twentieth-century Masters
- 1967 New Names, Fifteen Graphic Artists, Take It Out on Loan, Buy It, Thirteen from Slovakia, Fantasy Aspects in Contemporary Czech Art, František Foltýn, 7 + 7, Photography, Gutai, Five Sculptors, Eva Brýdlová, Otakar Slavík
- 1968 Jozef Jankovič: Sculptures, Jiří Načeradský: Paintings, Dagmar Hendrychová, Rudolf Němec, Adriena Šimotová, New Things, Barbara Gasch, The Beginnings of a Generation, Šmidrové, The West German and West Berlin Avant-garde for Lidice, The Concretists’ Club (Klub konkrétistů), Jiří Kolář, Vojtěch Preissig, Intersymposium ČSSR – Bechyně Pottery 68
- 1969 Zbyněk Sekal, Assembled Pictures and Sculptures, Jiří Balcar, Vladimír Boudník, Mira Haberernová, Ladislav Novák, Marcel Duchamp, Enrico Baj, Daisy Mrázková, Stanislav Podhrázský, Jiří Sever, Zorka Ságlová, Something Somewhere, Mikuláš Medek, Libor Fára, Karel Pauzer, Jan Kubíček, Jana Želibská
- 1970 Stanislav Kolíbal, Zdeněk Sýkora: Works, 1959–70; Eva Kmentová: Traces, Otakar Slavík: Paintings, Karel Nepraš: Please, Film!, Václav Cígler: Sculptures, Naděžda Plíšková: Graphic Art and Sculpture, 1968–70, Vladimír Kopecký: Paintings, František Hudeček: Works, 1930–70: A Selection; Artchemo, Adriena Šimotová
- 1990 The Hollar Association of Czech Graphic Artists: Member’s Anniversary Exhibition of Works from 1970 to 1990, The Hollar Association of Czech Graphic Artists after a Twenty-year Interruption
- 1991 Interpretation, Czech Art Informel. Structural Photography, the Circle of Bratislava Confrontations and Non-mainstream Artists, Rudolf Sikora, The Jindřich Chalupecký Prize for 1990: Vladimír Kokolia, Jan Ambrůz, František Skála Jr, Jan Ambrůz: Of Lightness and Heaviness, Vladimír Kokolia: Energy, Wortlaut/Word-Sound, Kateřina Černá: Paintings/Prints, New Names, Jaroslav Róna 1988–91, Václav Stratil: Monastic Patient, Jiří Kornatovský: Drawings, Victor Sanovec: Works, Eva Švankmajerová: Caesarean Section

=== 2006 ===
- Tomáš Bican – Prague: The City

=== 2010 ===
- Jiří Černický – Gagarin’s Thing and Things I Am Not Sorry For

=== 2011 ===
- Vladimír Kokolia – Power Transmission
- Pavel Baňka – On Photography
- Pictures from the History of Czech Photography
- Tono Stano – White Shadow
- Tomáš Císařovský – To the Point Where
- Petr Pastrňák – Burning Forest
- Jiří Skála – You Are the Object, I Am the Impulse

=== 2012 ===
- Mark Ther a Ludwig, Oskar und Thomas?
- František Skála – Shines/September
- Roman Trabura – Light Obsession
- Rudo Prekop – Two in One
- Jan Merta – To the People of Prague on My Sixtieth Birthday
- Twenty Years of Success of the B.K.S. Subcommittee for the Suppression of Publicity

=== 2013 ===
- The Reality Group, ACCORDING TO/KNAVISHLY
- Jaroslav Róna – Paintings and Sculptures

=== 2014 ===
- Wu Yi – Prague Summer
- Jan Hísek – River
- Petr Písařík – Who Here Really Means It ...
- Jiří David, Andy Hope 1930, Florian Meisenberg
- Otto Placht – Rainforest Metaforms
- Veronika Šrek Bromová – The Story of Chaos
- Kateřina Vincourová – By Heart

=== 2015 ===
- Milan Salák – Transformets
- Jiří Straka – Building Sites of Ink
- Jan Bačkovský – Paintings
- The OBR Art Group (2007–2015)
- Ivana Lomová – Emptiness
- Hynek Martinec – Intellectual Properties

== See also ==
- List of museums in Prague
