= Jiří Seifert =

Czech sculptor, medalist and restorer (1932–1999)

- Born: 5 September 1932; Prague, Czechoslovakia
- Died: 25 July 1999 (aged 66); Řevnice, Czech Republic
- Education: Academy of Applied Arts
- Occupations: Sculptor; medalist; restorer
- Spouse: Hana Seifertová (m. 1959)
- Children: 1

Jiří Seifert (5 September 1932 – 25 July 1999) was a Czech sculptor, medalist and restorer. Following the Soviet invasion in 1968 and during subsequent normalization, Seifert was persecuted and barred from exhibiting his work. Seifert was member of Fédération internationale de la médaille d'art (FIDEM) and in 1990s chairmen of the Mánes Union of Fine Arts and chairmen of the honorary committee of european sculptors in Sankt Margarethen im Burgenland.

== Life ==
Jiří Seifert was born on 5 September 1932 in Prague. He was the son of a high school professor and a teacher. After his birth, the family moved from Prague to Turnov, where his father got a job at the grammar school as a teacher of geography and gymnastics. He was forced to enlist for labor during the war, after the communist coup in February 1948 he lost his job and worked at a secondary school in Jablonec nad Nisou. Jiří spent the war years in Mělník with his grandparents, where he learned to swim in the Elbe River and then took up this sport competitively. In 1949, he became the Junior Czechoslovak swimming champion. In addition, he took up climbing in the sandstone rocks around Turnov and the direct physical contact with the stone strongly influenced his later sculptural work. He became friends with the sculptor and mountaineer Valerián Karoušek, the younger son of a Turnov merchant in whose house the Seiferts lived.

After graduating from the Real Gymnasium (1945–1947) in 1947–1951, he studied jewellery making at the Secondary School of Arts and Crafts in Jablonec nad Nisou (prof. V. Vorlíček, V. Pokorný). In 1951, he passed the entrance examination to the Academy of Applied Arts in Prague, but was rejected for political reasons and spent the next year working as a road construction worker. He was not admitted to the studio of Prof. Bedřich Stefan at the Academy of Applied Arts until the following year (1952). On the recommendation of his professor, during the holidays of 1956 he completed an apprenticeship with the stonemason and sculptor Otakar Velinský. The school was relatively independent during the period of the most rigid Stalinism, thanks to the rector Adolf Hoffmeister. The head of the studio, Bedřich Stefan, protected the students from political issues. Stefan belonged to the pre-war avant-garde and had unquestionable authority. He was open to the individual needs of his students, but at the same time consistently ensured perfect mastery of his craft. He commissioned his pupils to model animals or ancient elements and allowed them to collaborate with architects and participate in small commissions for utilitarian objects. The drawing of the nude from a live model was led by Prof. Jan Bauch.

During his studies and then during his stay in Řevnice, Jiří Seifert became friends with a number of artists, especially from the circle of Wagner's studio and the later UB 12 group ([Kmentová, Zoubek, Janoušek, Janoušková), and Adriena Šimotová, Jiří John, Václav Boštík, architect Otto Rothmayer and theologian Zdeněk Bonaventura Bouše. Since their joint exhibition in 1966, he also repeatedly visited Bohuslav Reynek.

After graduation in 1958, he started a one-year internship at the ZUKOV foundry. In 1959 he married art historian Hana Seifertová (née Korecká) and moved with her to Liberec, where Seifertová took up the post of director of the Regional Gallery. In 1962 their daughter Barbora was born. Jiří Seifert and his wife were active organizers of the local cultural scene and the founding members of Group 7 (1959), with which Seifert exhibited until 1969. His circle of friends in Liberec included the painter Vladimír Komárek, the photographer and art historian Čestmír Krátký, and the artist and founder of actor´s Studio Ypsilon Jan Schmid; he also had close contacts with architects from the SIAL studio.

In 1962 he travelled to Lebanon and visited the ancient monuments there. The following year he travelled to Holland, where he was strongly attracted by the sculptural work of Hans Arp. He took part in the Liberec exhibitions Sculpture 64, Sculpture in the Open Air (1966), and Sculpture and the City (1969), the Biennale internationale des jeunes artistes in Paris (1966), and the exhibition of Czech sculpture in the Musée Rodin, Paris (1968). With the arch. Miroslav Masák's team, he collaborated on the design of the relaxation spa Teplice-Šanov, which was presented at the Biennial of Youth in Mexico City (1968) and won the jury prize.

In 1969, he had the opportunity to work at a symposium of European sculptors in Sankt Margarethen im Burgenland. The Austrian sculptor Karl Prantl, who organized the symposium and was a recognized moral authority, became Seifert's friend. He influenced Seifert's further work and his way of working with stone towards simplicity and compactness of form, as well as his reflections on the spiritual message of the work and the space that the sculpture conquers.

After his personal commitment against the August occupation in 1968 and after he installed Calvary and the Plague Column at the exhibition Sculpture and the City (1969) in Liberec and created the monumental Bell Tower for Jan Palach in Sankt Margarethen im Burgenland, he lost the opportunity to exhibit for a long time. At the same time, Hana Seifert was dismissed from her job at the Regional Gallery in Liberec during the purges in senior positions, and in 1970 they both moved to the house of Seifert's grandparents in Řevnice.

In the following years, Seifert restored a collection of ancient casts for Charles University in the dissolved monastery in Hostinné, worked briefly as an assistant in modelling at the Czech Technical University in Prague (1972–1973) and won some commissions for architecture. He last travelled abroad in 1972 to Târgu Jiu, Romania, for a meeting of the informal association of European sculptors from Sankt Margarethen im Burgenland. In 1978 he had to surrender his passport as a "person hostile to the socialist establishment".

In 1985–1986 he worked on a copy of the Gothic reliefs from the tympanum of the Church of Our Lady before Týn in Prague, which replaced the original in the Lapidarium of the National Museum.

In 1986 he participated at the sculpture symposium in Přední Kopanina. It was not until 1987 that he received permission to travel to Switzerland and to the sculpture symposium in Triavno, Bulgaria. After 1989 he participated in the restoration of the Mánes Union of Fine Arts and, together with Olbram Zoubek, in the founding of a new art association, the Union of Visual Artists, where he was elected vice president. A trip to Greece and Crete, which he took with his wife in 1991, brought a number of impulses for his further work. He participated in sculpture symposia in Hořice (1991), Germany and Italy (1991–1992). His retrospective at the Museum in Bochum (1992) placed Seifert, after years of isolation, once again in the context of world sculpture. In Fanano, Italy, he won first prize for his sculptures made of local limestone (1992). In the 1990s, he participated in a number of sculpture symposia, even four in 1995 (Banská Štiavnica, Klenová, Milevsko and České Budějovice).

Since 1969, he was a member of the Fédération internationale de la médaille d'art (FIDEM) and was regularly invited to exhibitions of this association in Prague, Cologne, Kraków, Budapest, Lisbon, Florence, Stockholm and the United States. Since 1992, after the fall of the communist regime, he worked as an external teacher at the Academy of Fine Arts in Prague in the studio of restoration of sculptures. In 1995 and again in 1997 he was elected chairman of the Mánes Union of Fine Arts.

His last original sculpture came from a symposium in Klášter-Hradiště in 1997, where he was already seriously ill. At the end of the 1990s, due to deteriorating health, he was unable to work with sculptural material and Jaroslav Řehna participated in the realization of his larger projects. This collaboration resulted in a fountain in Kounic Palace in Prague (completed 2003) and a courtyard with water features in the Czech Centre in Paris (1995-1997).

Seifert has died on 25 July 1999 in Řevnice, at the age of 67.

== Work ==
Seifert's sculptural work has its antecedents in nature and draws inspiration from the ancient roots of human civilization. His relationship with the material was passionate and his bodily contact with stone and wood is sometimes recorded in relief as fingerprints or footprints (Bed, 1973, Footprints, 1984). The turn to very personal subjects in the early 1970s can be seen as a kind of defensive reaction in the context of the rapid decline of society after the Soviet occupation and during the period of normalization. The chamber works from this period humanise and populate the space of the home, giving it the hallmark of Seifert's personality and at the same time relieving people of fear and anxiety (Shelf with Curtain and Skull, 1976, Table with Hat and Package, 1979). The ban on exhibiting also meant the loss of the necessary corrective of professional criticism, and the sculptor himself later admitted that he had made some mistakes.

Restoration work in the collection of ancient casts at the Institute for Classical Archaeology of Charles University in Hostinné was reflected in his works through the need to enrich his own sculptures with tactility, sensuality of surface and more subtle modelling. The definitive transition from sandstone to the finer texture of harder marble allowed for a change in formal range and deepened the direct connection to classical sculpture. It is manifested, for example, in the many variations of drapery, or in the fluting, which survived as a stylized remnant of the depiction of movement but in Seifert's conception became an element of content and ethics.

=== 1958–1970 ===
Seifert's diploma work was a brass jewellery box with cut agate. At that time, he was mainly engaged in graphic art and drawing, and at the first exhibition of Group 7 he also presented oil paintings and jewellery. Seifert's figurative sculptures in polychrome plaster and wood from the late 1950s have not survived. At the same time he created several intimate bird sculptures in hornwork but soon began working in wood, sandstone and slate. He was introduced to slate right out of high school as a road construction worker and then used it throughout his life to create jewelry, plaquettes and medals. His sculptures in sandstone are at first softly modelled figures (Reclining, before 1963), whose generally metaphorical basis is related to the search for organic and natural form in stone and also represents Seifert's distinction from 1950s realism. Sculptures with symbolic content, such as Monument of Monuments (1965), referring to the fate of monuments removed by the communist regime, also have an abstract organic form (exhibited in Musée Rodin, Paris in 1968).

Seifert mainly presented drawings at his solo exhibitions in Prague in 1966 and 1971. He exhibited some stone sculptures at the open-air event Sculpture 64 in Liberec (Wave, Metamorphosis, Gate) and at the Sculpture Balance II in Olomouc (Landmark, 1967). He took part in an exhibition of North Bohemian artists in Mánes entitled A Land Defied (1967), to which official criticism reacted sharply. He also took part in the largest exhibition, Sculpture and the City (July-August 1969), which still managed to take place in Liberec thanks to the involvement of a number of important personalities, the international jury and the continuing chaotic situation in state institutions a year after the occupation.

In 1968-1969, Seifert created the major works The Plague Column (Cheb Triennial Prize, 1968, Liberec 1969) and the monumental Bell Tower for Jan Palach at the St. Margarethen Sculpture Symposium.

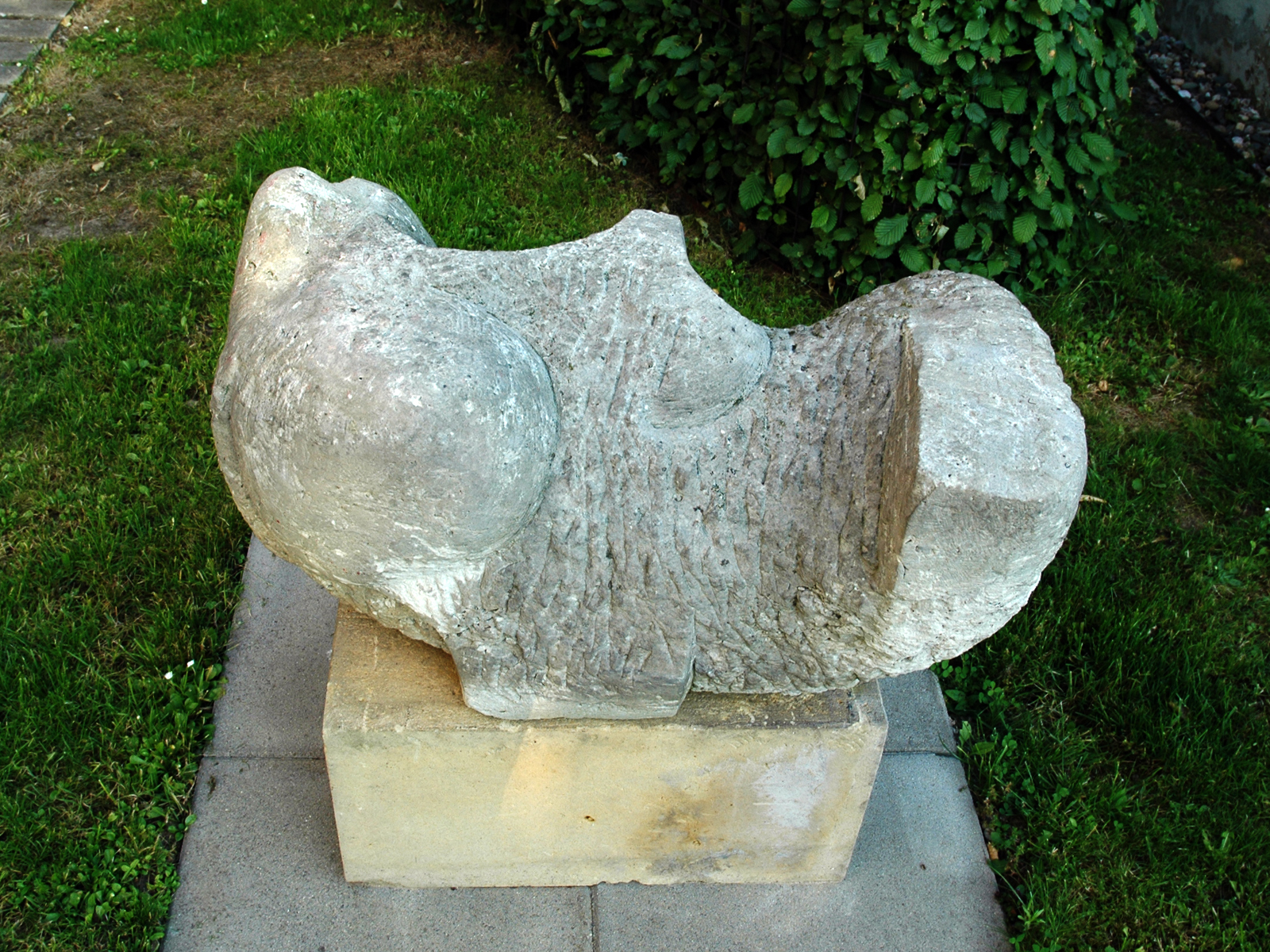
Reclining (Situation), sandstone, (1963)

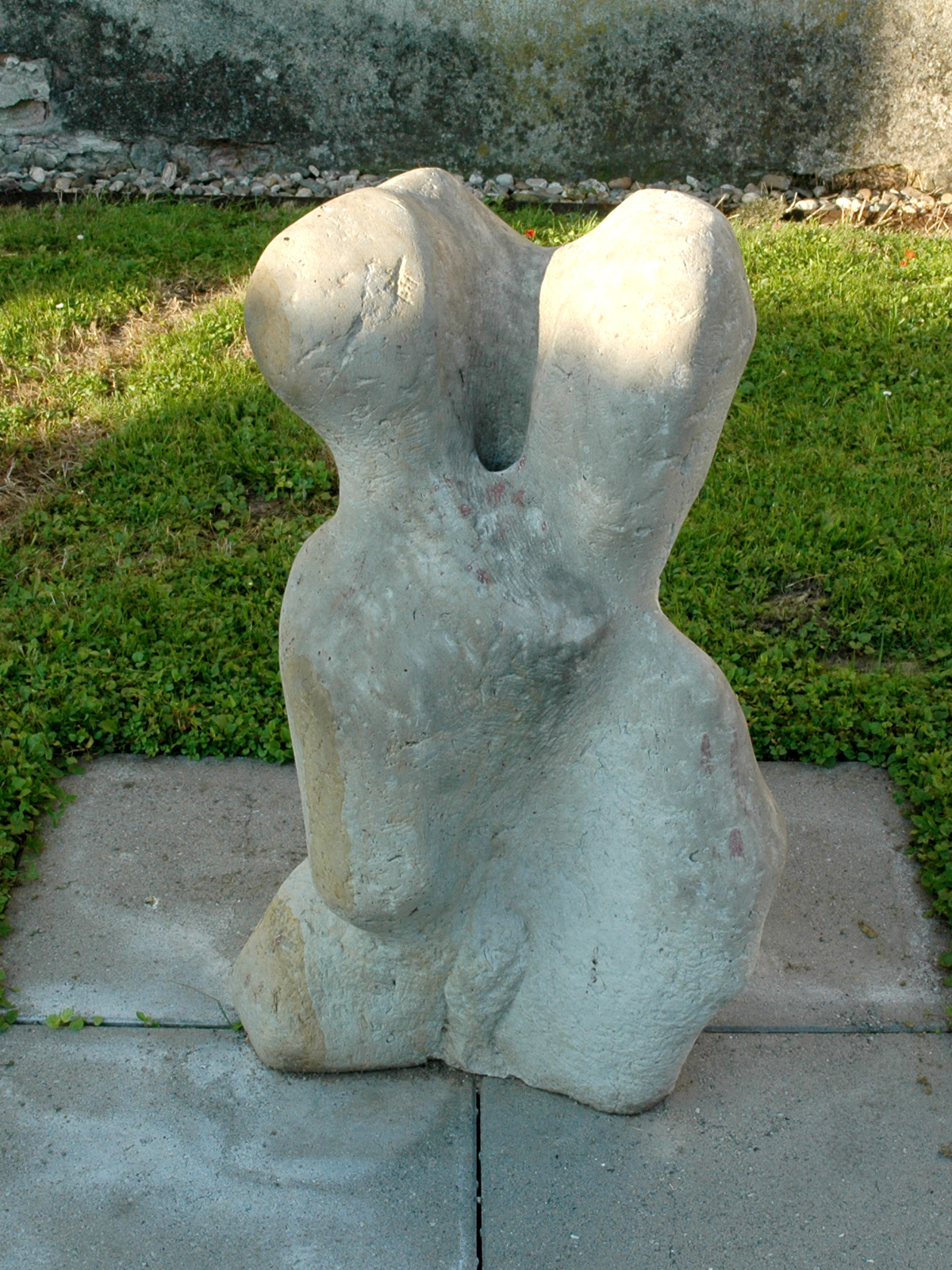
Metamorphosis, marlstone, (1964)

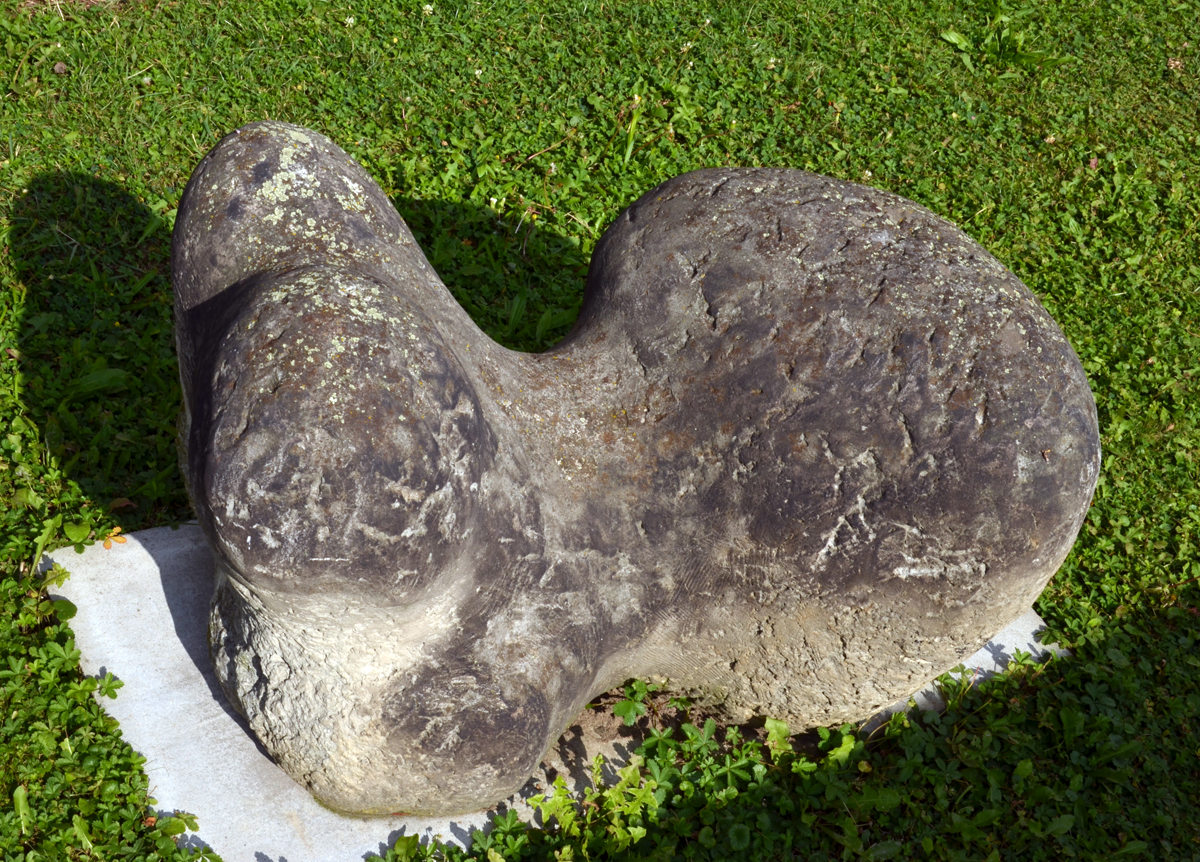
Lying torso, sandstone, (1965-1966)

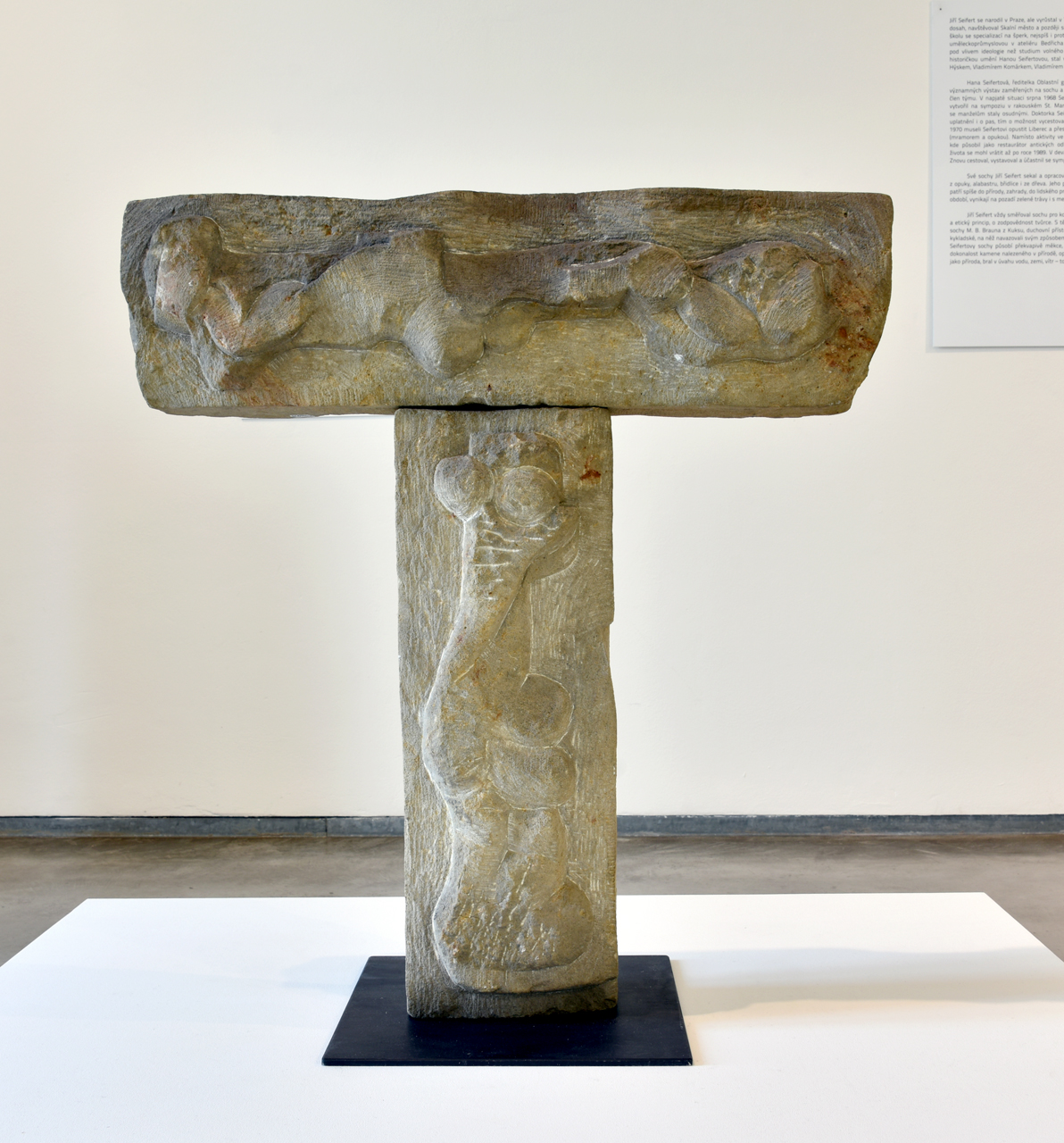
A Stop Along the Way of the Cross, sandstone, (1966), Museum of Art, Olomouc

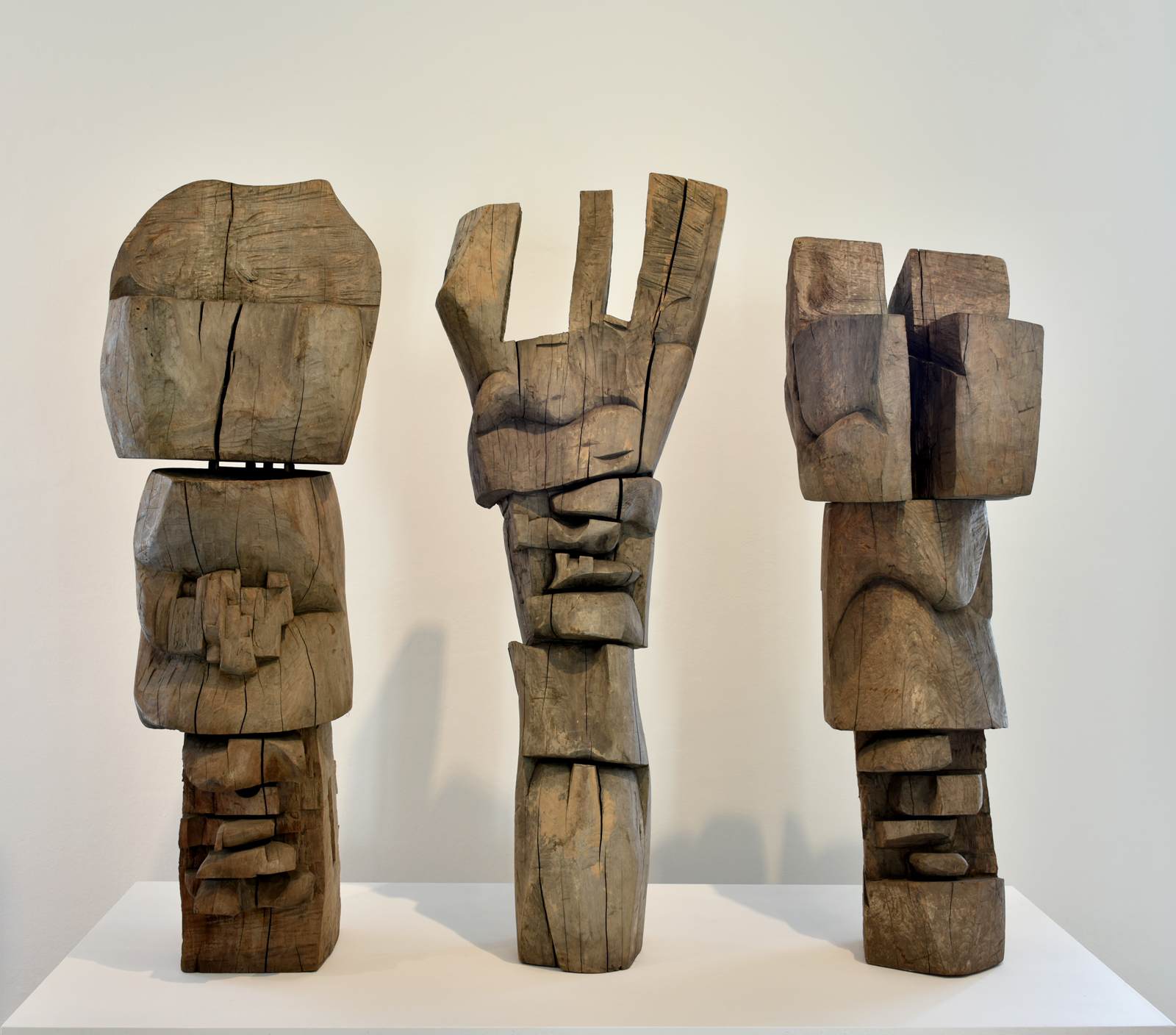
Calvary, wood, (1968)

=== 1970–1999 ===
Seifert's involuntary isolation at the beginning of the normalization period was also reflected in the themes of his work and his departure from monumental symbols to the creation of a private space in which he gradually installed sculptural representations of familiar objects. In the early 1970s, he worked mostly with wood (the Furniture series: Table with a Package, Mysterious Box, Bed) and marlstone (Lamp, 1971). In connection with the restoration of ancient sculptures, Seifert became more interested in their mythological meaning and the history of antiquity. The inspiration of antiquity was manifested in his work by the transition to working in marble, the adoption of some elements of modelling and the degree of idealisation that shifts the object into the form of a symbol.

At that time, he transferred into stone the form of things whose material essence is soft and shapeless (Pillow, 1976), taking advantage of the subtle modelling of the surface that marble makes possible (Easter, wood, 1982, marble). He creates the illusion of flowing fabric (Tablecloth, 1980), barefoot prints (Footprints, 1980) or movement fixed in stone (Movement, 1989, Attempted Movement, 1990, Wandering, 1993). His figurative sculptures are entirely abstract (Little Muse, 1975) or slender, lightweight shapes (Fluting, 1989), and are loosely related to the abstract sculpture of Bedřich Stefan from the 1920s (Torso).

Pillow, marble (1969-1976)

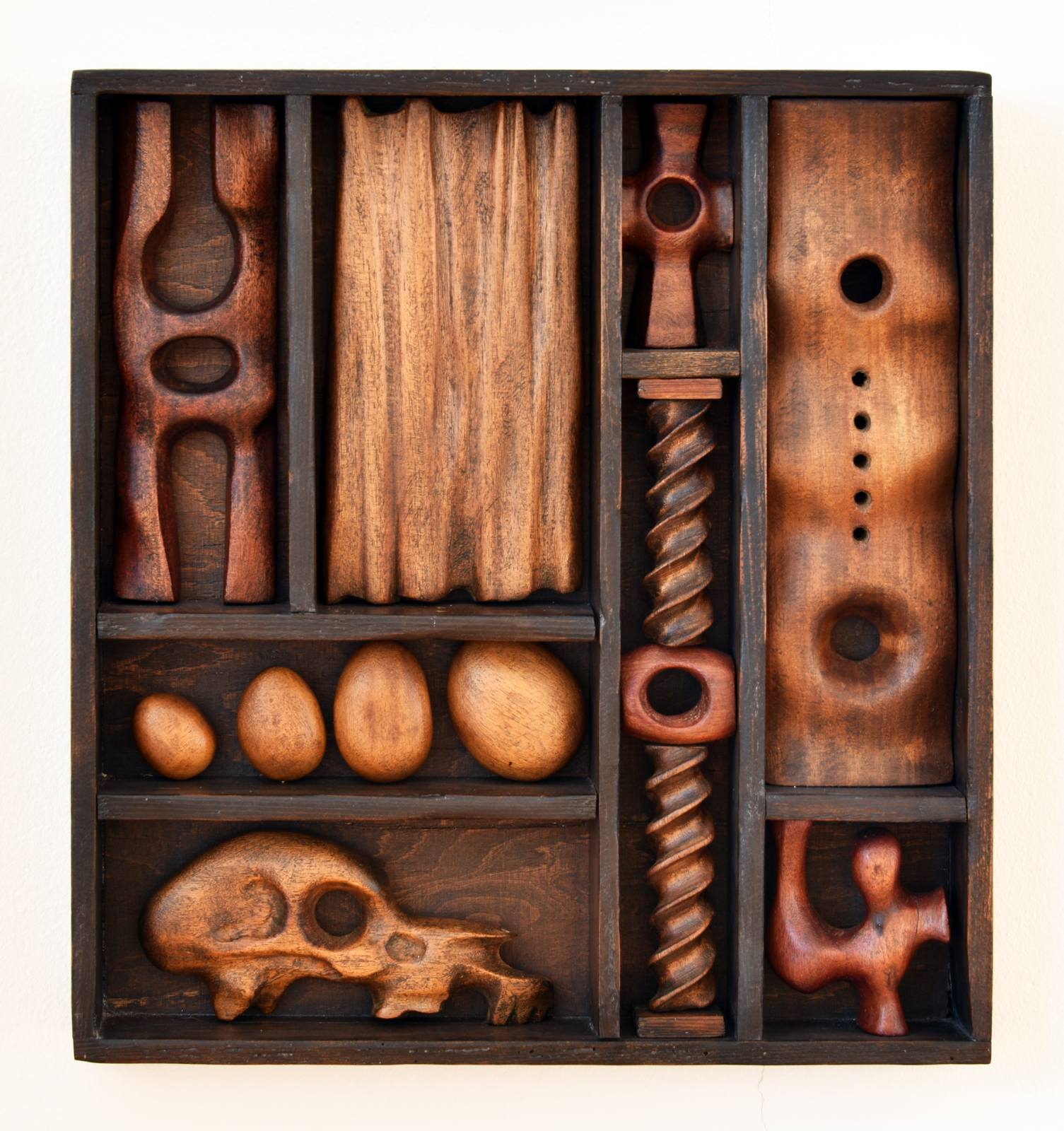
Shelf with a curtain and a skull, patinated wood (1976)

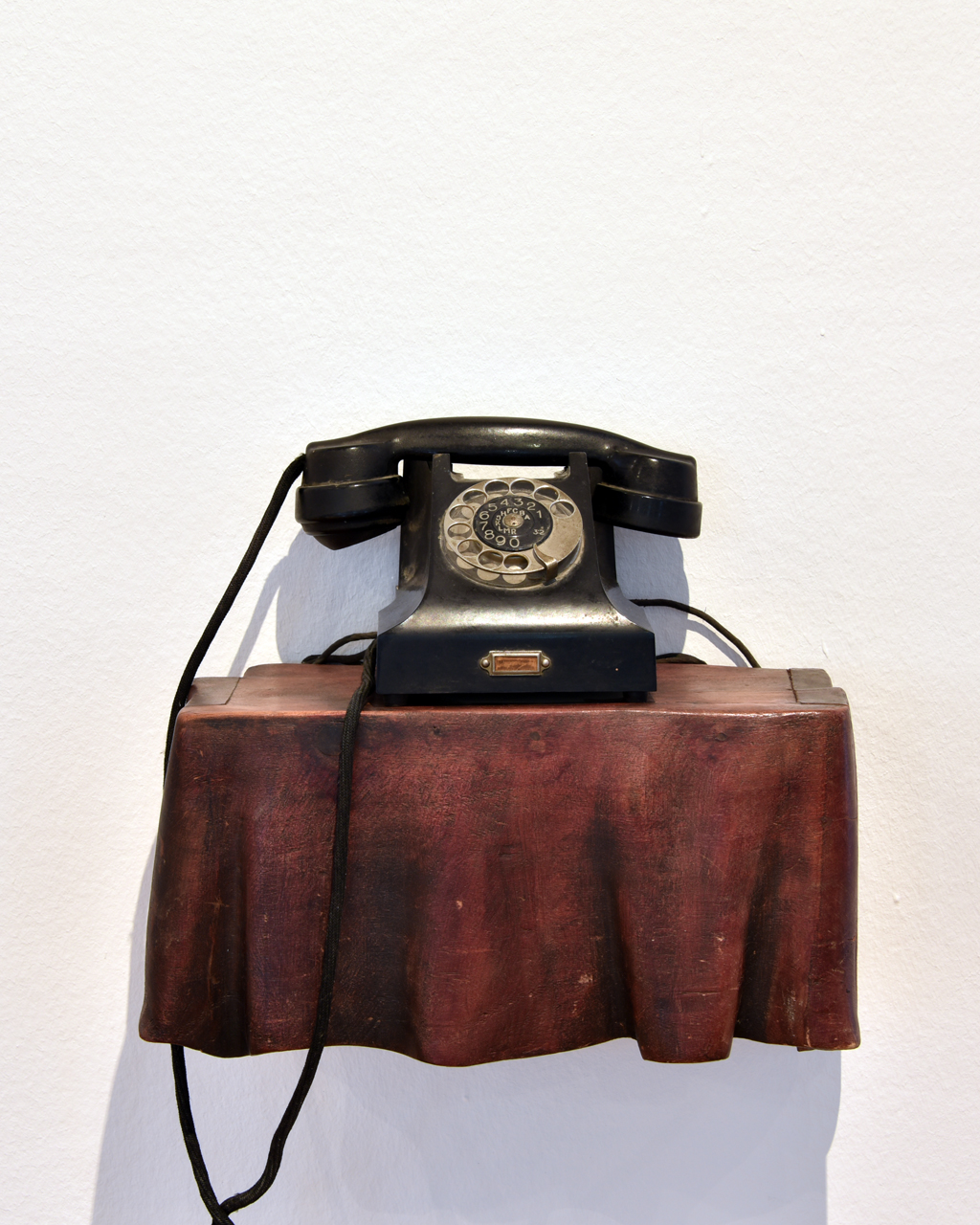
Shelf with telephone, patinated wood (1975)

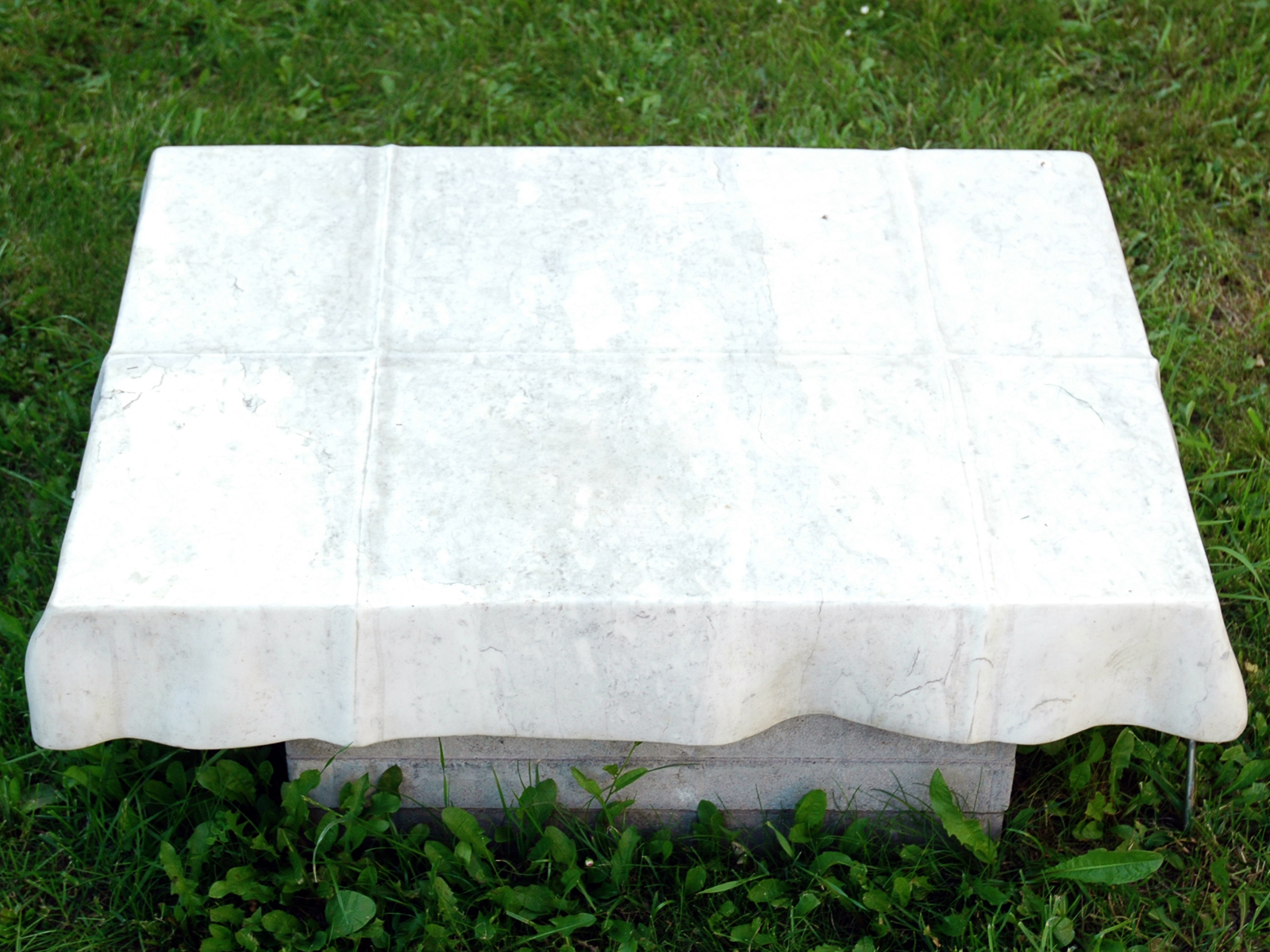
Tablecloth, marble (1980)

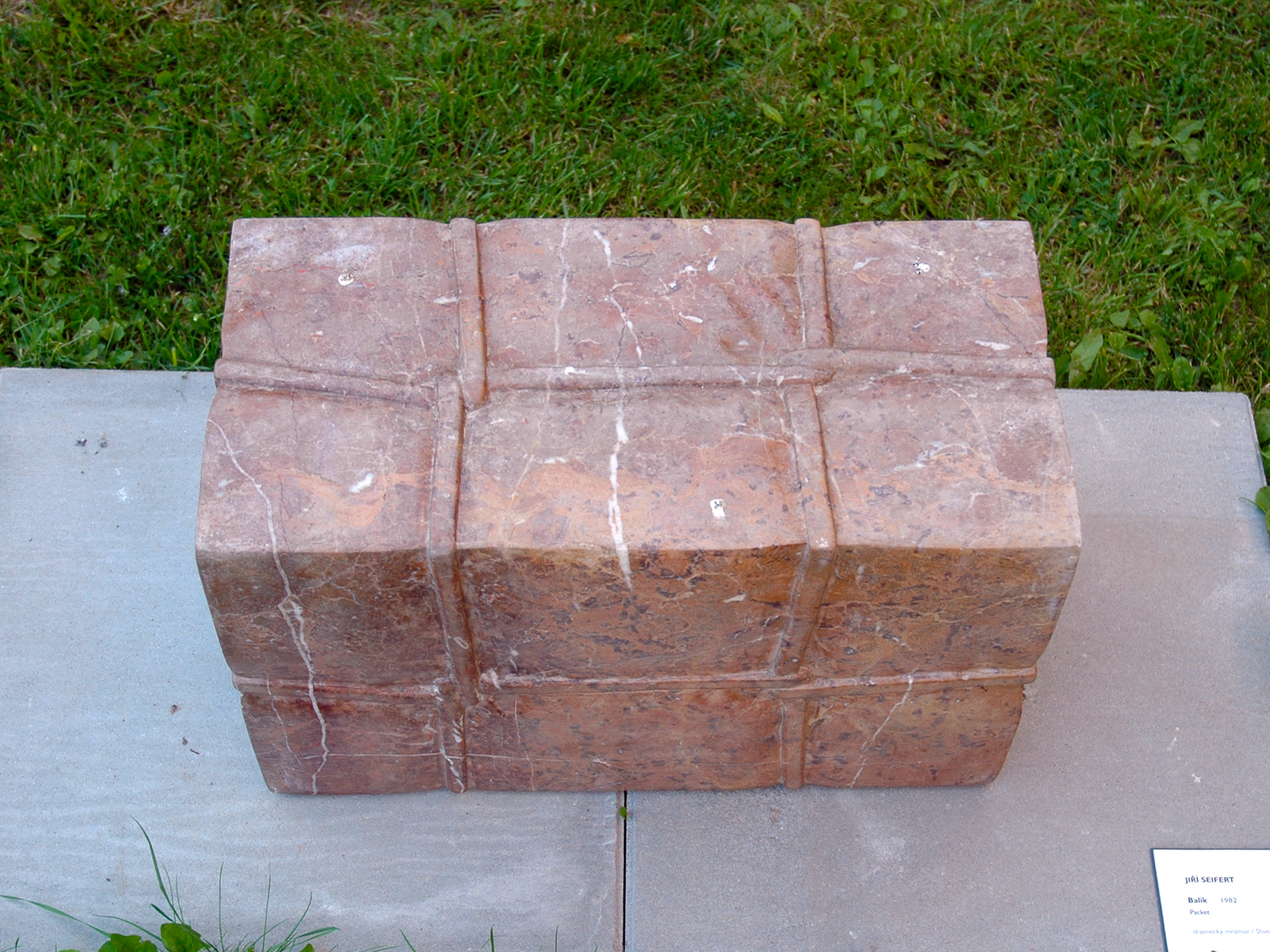
Package, slivenec marble (1982)

He has dealt with the theme of movement since the second half of the 1980s, using the play of light and shadow on a fluted surface. He suggests internal tension through dynamic relief (Tension) and the use of perforation (Body, 1990, Movement in the Circle, Duality). He also applied the theme of movement, expressed by the asymmetrical representation of a geometric fluted stone shape, at the sculpture symposium in Hořice (1991).

Seifert processes the relief of the surface to emphasize the haptic qualities of the stone (Stone for Joy, 1988, Stones for Hannah series). The optical qualities of the stone are most evident in several alabaster sculptures (Crete, 1993, 1995). At other times, he uses the material perfection of white marble to evoke the sensory experience of the purity and coldness of a snowdrift (Horizon-Snowdrift, 1991) or, conversely, he respects the changing colour of marble and adapts the modelling of the surface to it (Physicality 2, 1995, Body, 1996).

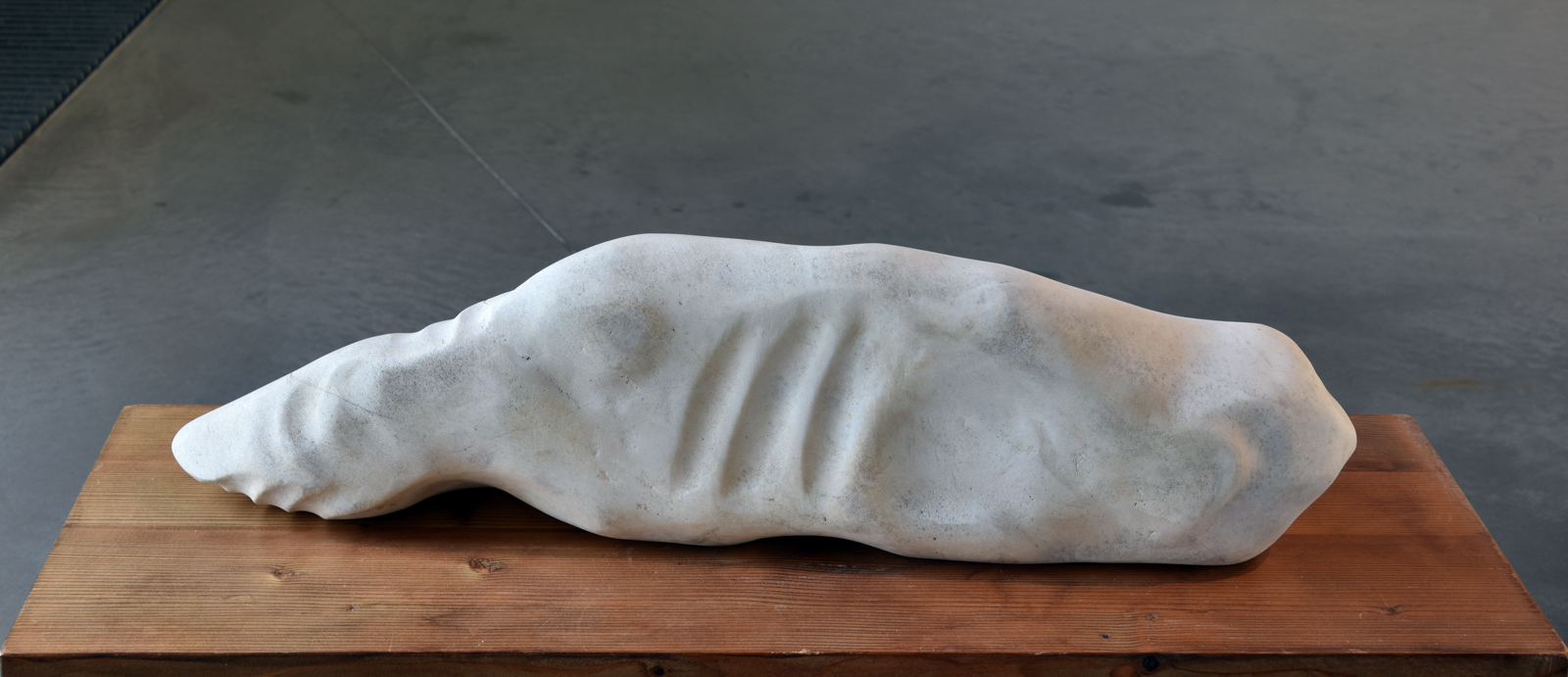
Cape Arkona, carrara marble (1979)

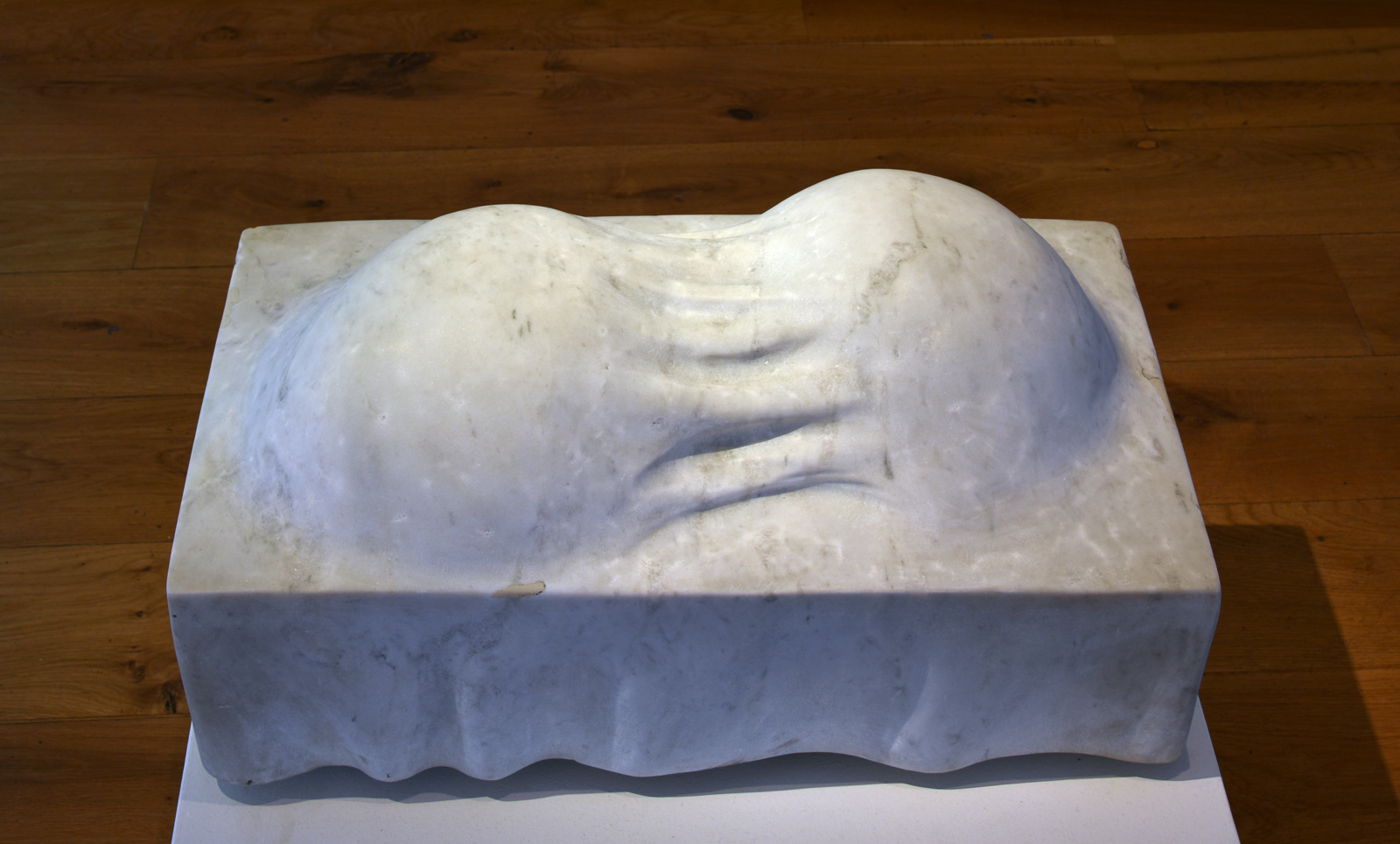
Easter, carrara marble (1983), Prague City Gallery

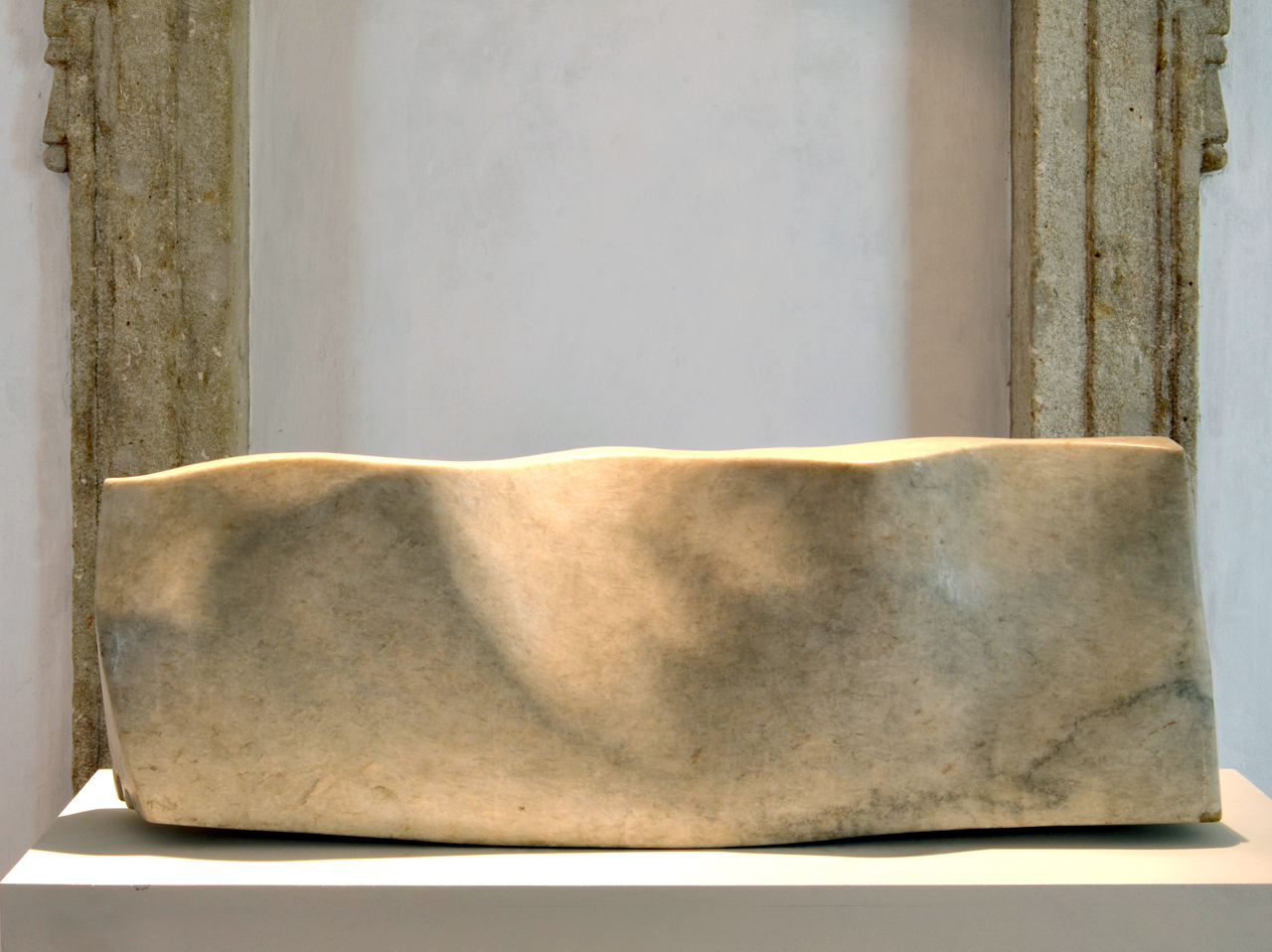
Wave, marble (1992), GASK

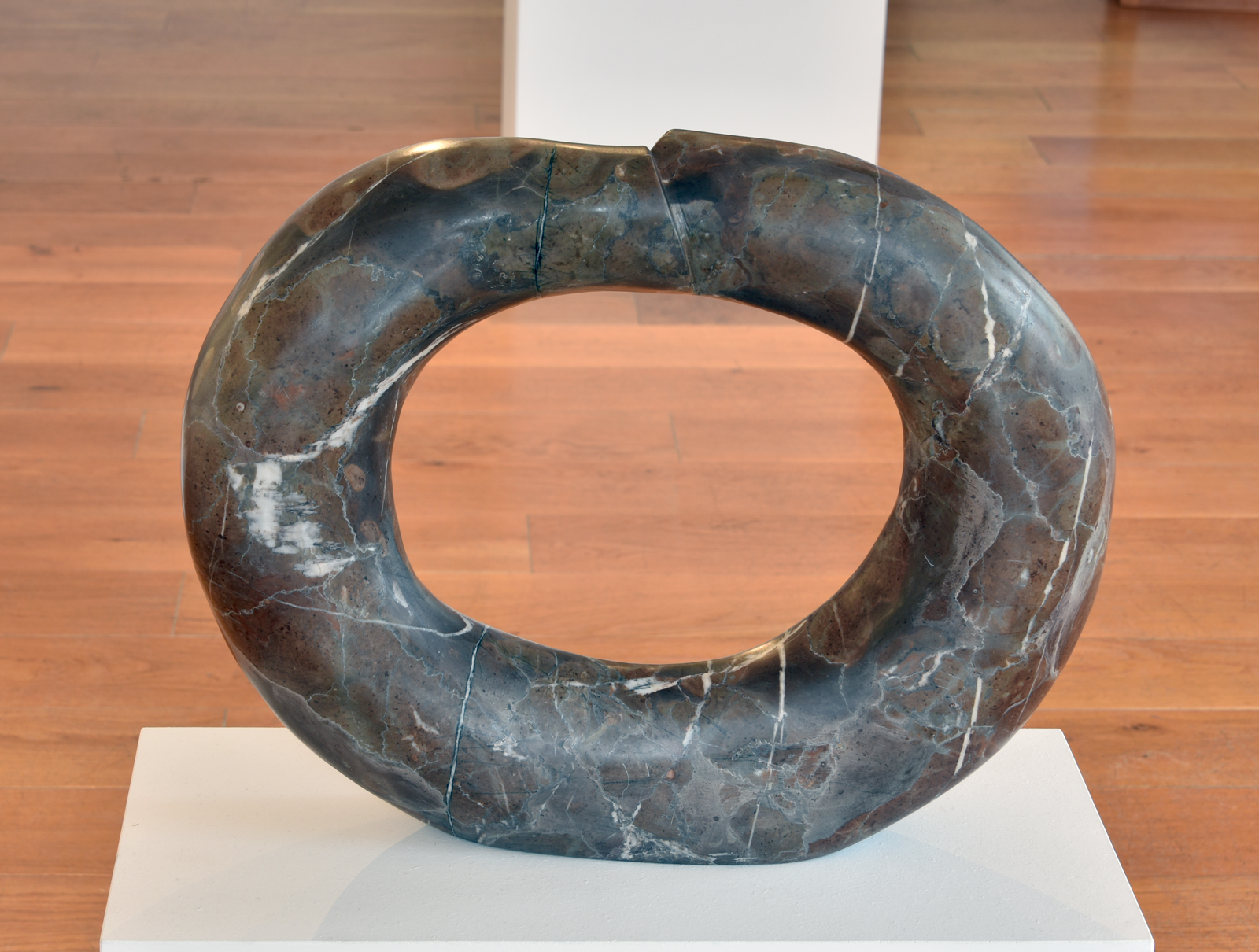
Desire, slivenec marble (1995)

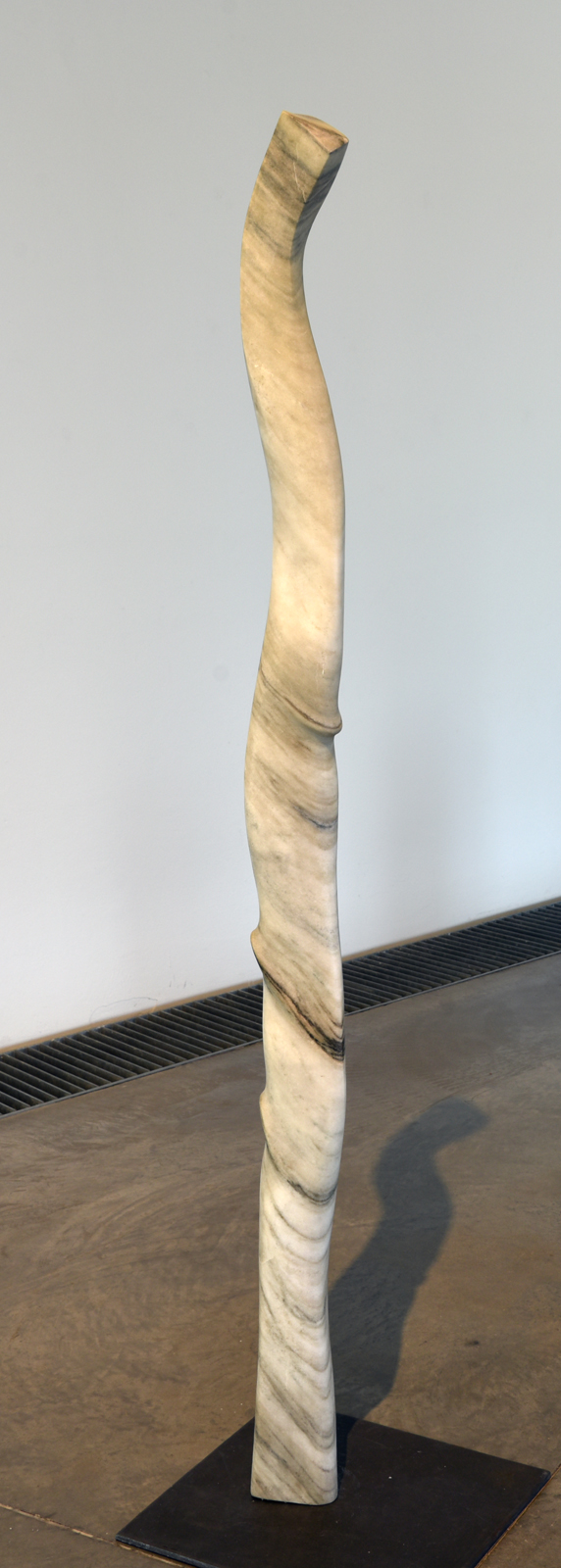
Column, marble (1998), Regional Gallery Liberec

The craftsmanship and sensitive processing of stone allows Seifert to go to the limit of the material's load-bearing capacity (Column for Hannah, 1992), especially in the sculpture Above the Morning II - Merging (1994), created from two undulating sheets of marble (39 x 43.5 x 4 cm, 39 x 44 x 1 cm).

In the abstract shapes, he admits his inspiration from Karl Prantl's sculptures and lets their harmonious solution of proportions act as a space that is meant to evoke a sense of sacredness in the viewer. Seifert had already considered the sculpture's outer and inner space earlier. A study on the subject of the sculpture's inner space is the almost constructivist spatial assemblage Labyrinth / Space (1969). His conception of sculpture often approaches an installation or object, as in the 1985 sculpture Small Symposium / Space, which he created in response to being banned from participating in the Portorož Sculpture Symposium.

The path to the formally refined and spiritual themes of his last period of work led through an exploration of all the possibilities of the noble stone. It can be characterized as a tendency to simplify shapes and abstract from objecthood and corporeality. His last works are private in nature (Cry of the Heart, The Big Red Cannelure, The Last Stone, 1999).

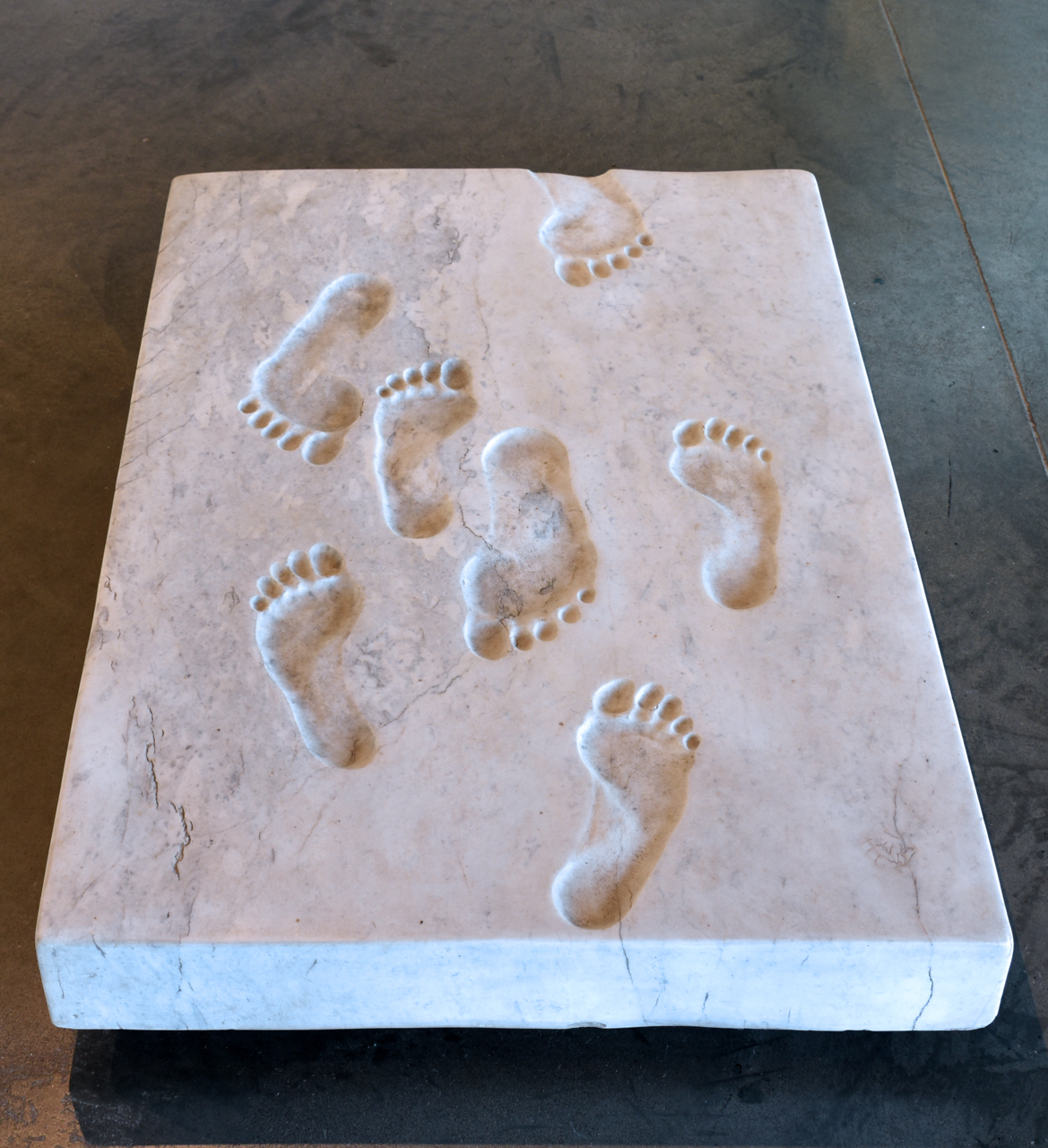
Footprints, carrara marble, (1984)

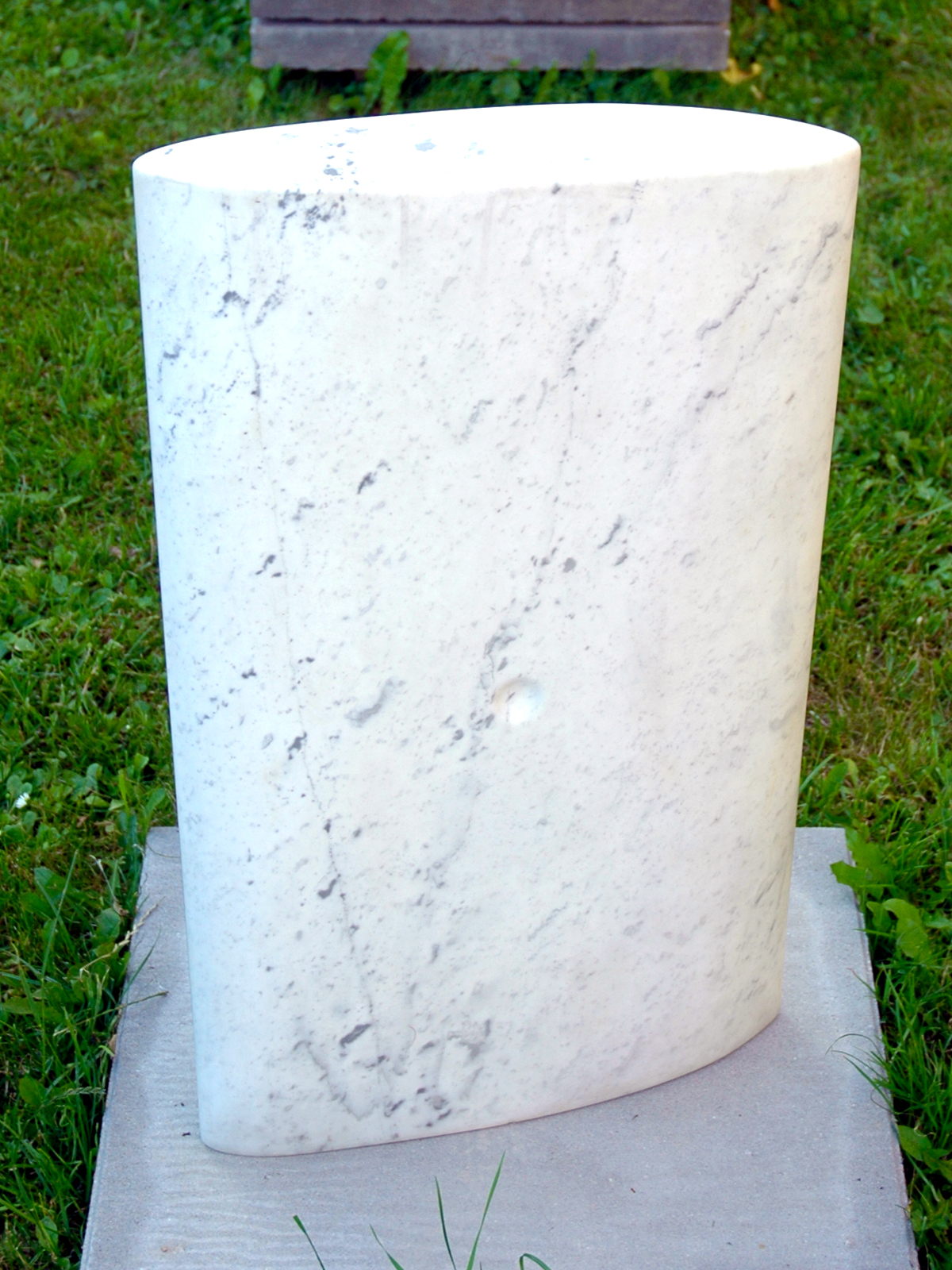
Body I, marble, (1991)

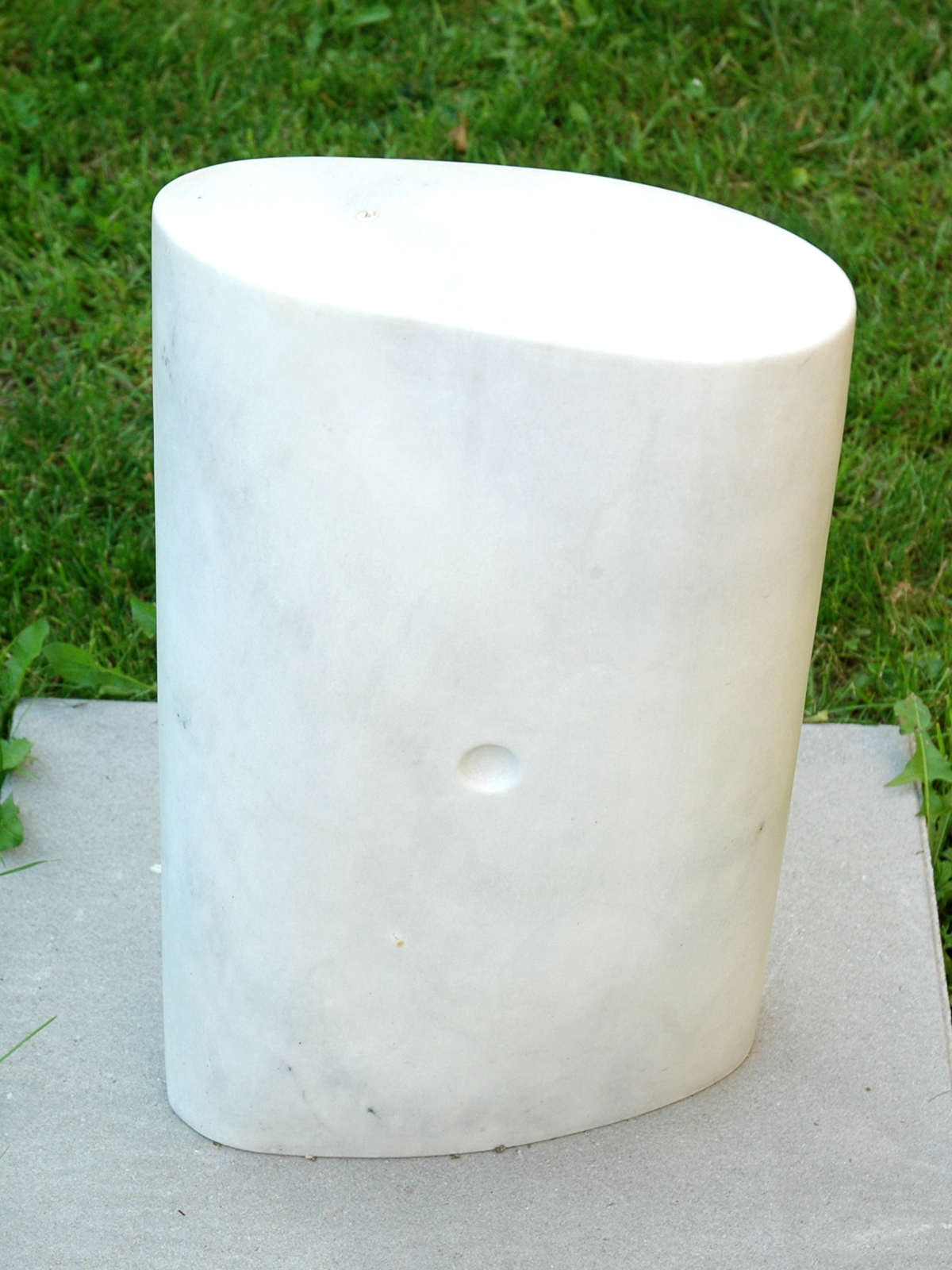
Body II, marble, (1995)

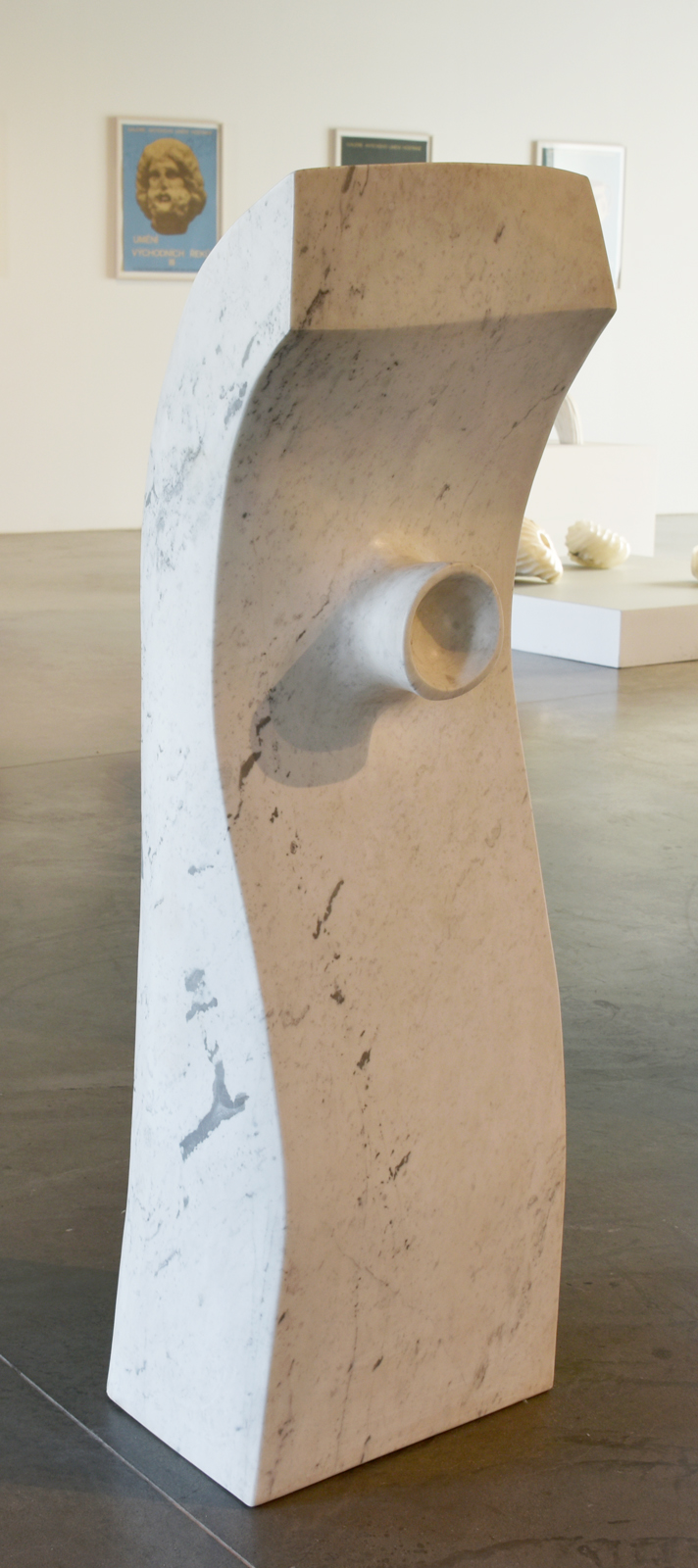
Cry of the Heart, carrara marble, (1999)

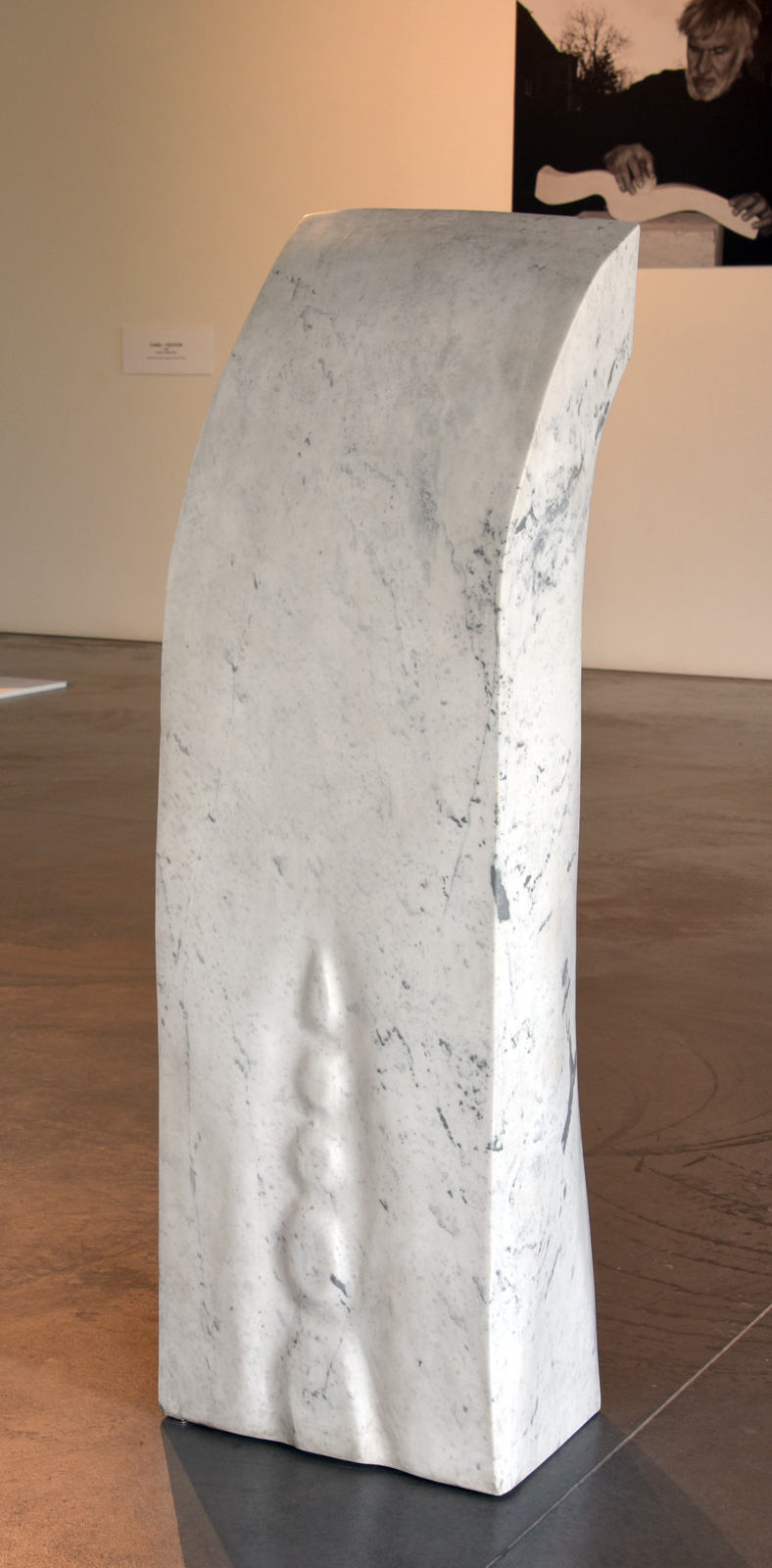
Cry of the Heart, carrara marble, (1999)

=== Realizations in architecture and sculptures in public space ===
Seifert had already established collaborations with local architects during his time in Liberec. He created the symbolic cornerstone for the television tower on Ještěd and collaborated with architect Miroslav Masák on the project of the Teplice-Šanov relaxation spa. He also participated in the design of the hall of the Botanical Institute of the Czechoslovak Academy of Sciences in Průhonice and the Libverda Spa House. In 1981, on the initiative of the SIAL studio, he designed and realized the Space in Honour of the Architect Adolf Loos in Liberec (removed under the pretext of reconstruction in 2008 and returned to its original location in 2020).

Seifert's late works are sculptures conceived for the interaction of stone with water. At the Czech Cultural Centre in Paris, he created two ramps where turbid water visually intensifies the effect of the natural veining of marble (1997). In the courtyard of the Kounic Palace in Prague there is a fountain in which water flows down the central marble column (1998–2003).

Stele, Liberec

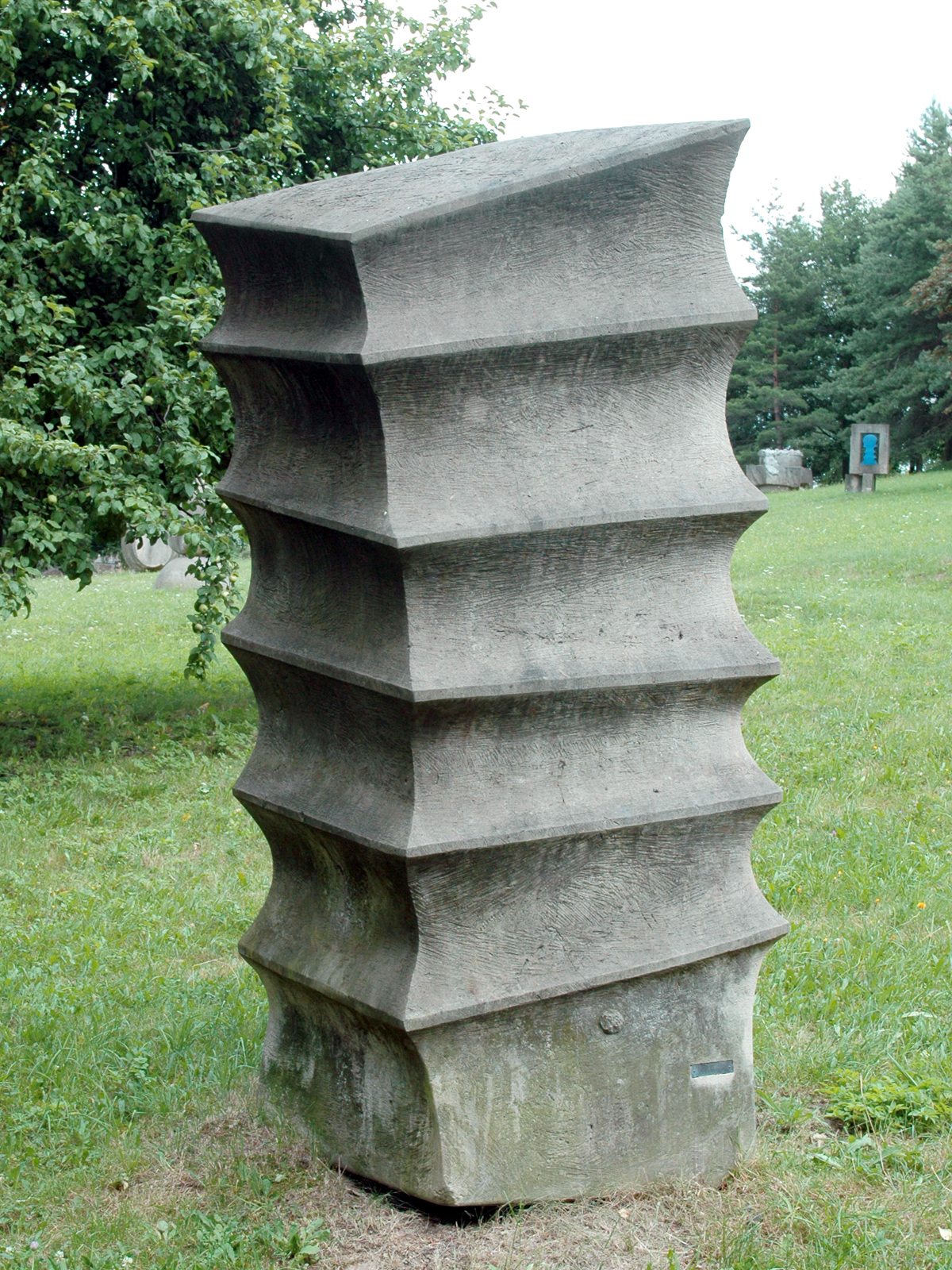
Viklan - Big canellure, pískovec, vrch Gothard, Hořice, (1991)

Balance, Stromovka České Budějovice

Guten Tag Syke, sculpture symposium Syke (1991)

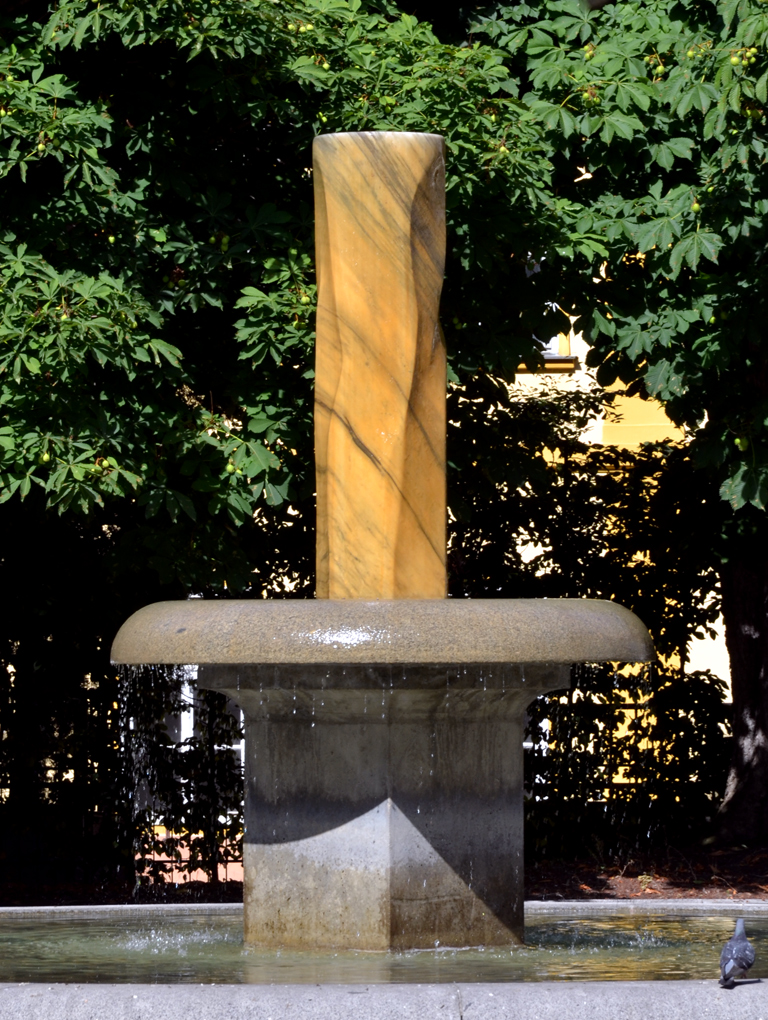
Fountain, Panská 7, Prague

=== Monuments and restoration ===
He is the creator of the reliefs depicting cities at the World War II Memorial in Ruprechtice (Liberec). Another type of work in public space is the symbolic Cemetery of Climbers under the Mariánská prospect near Hrubá Skála.

World War II Memorial in Ruprechtice (1966)

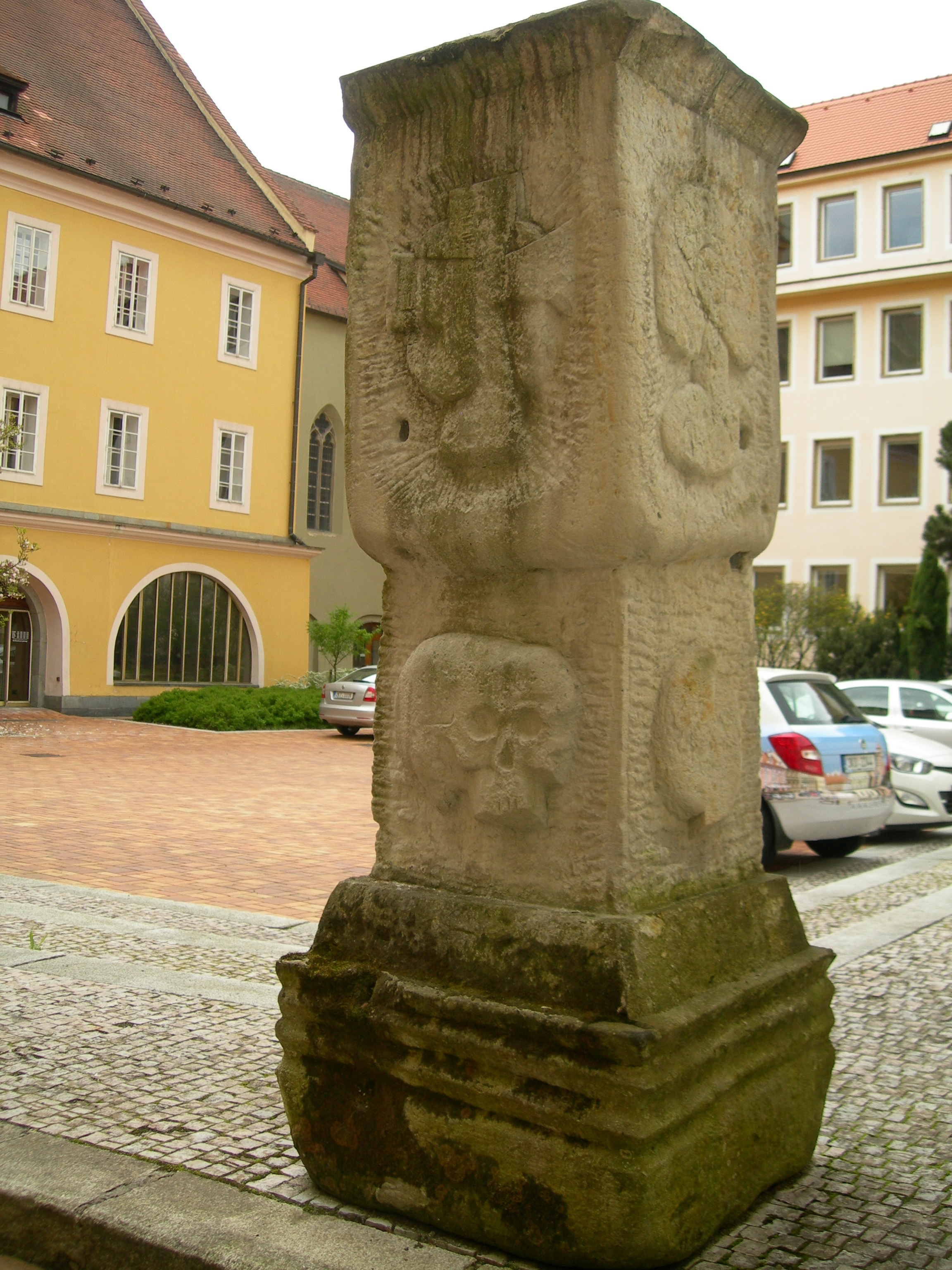
Plaque column, Cheb (1969)

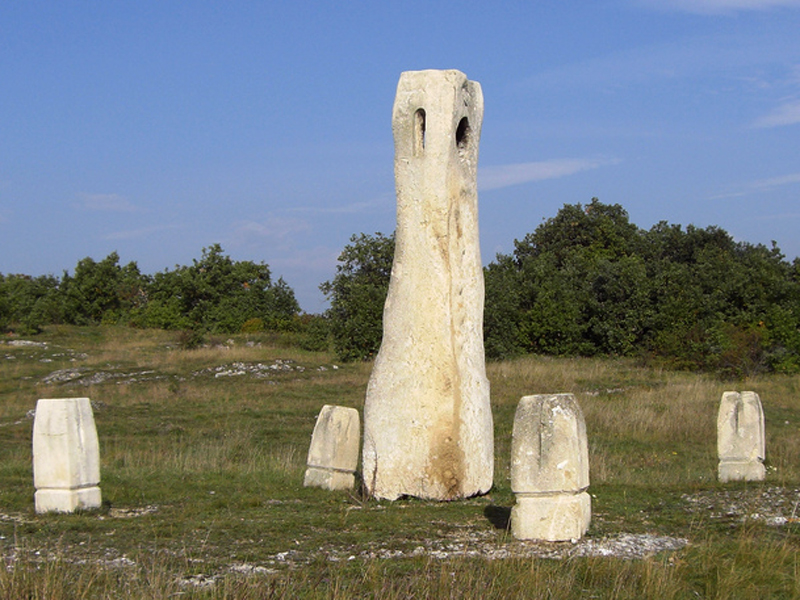
Bell Tower for Jan Palach, Sankt Margarethen im Burgenland (1969)

Symbolic cemetry of mountain climbers, Hrubá Skála

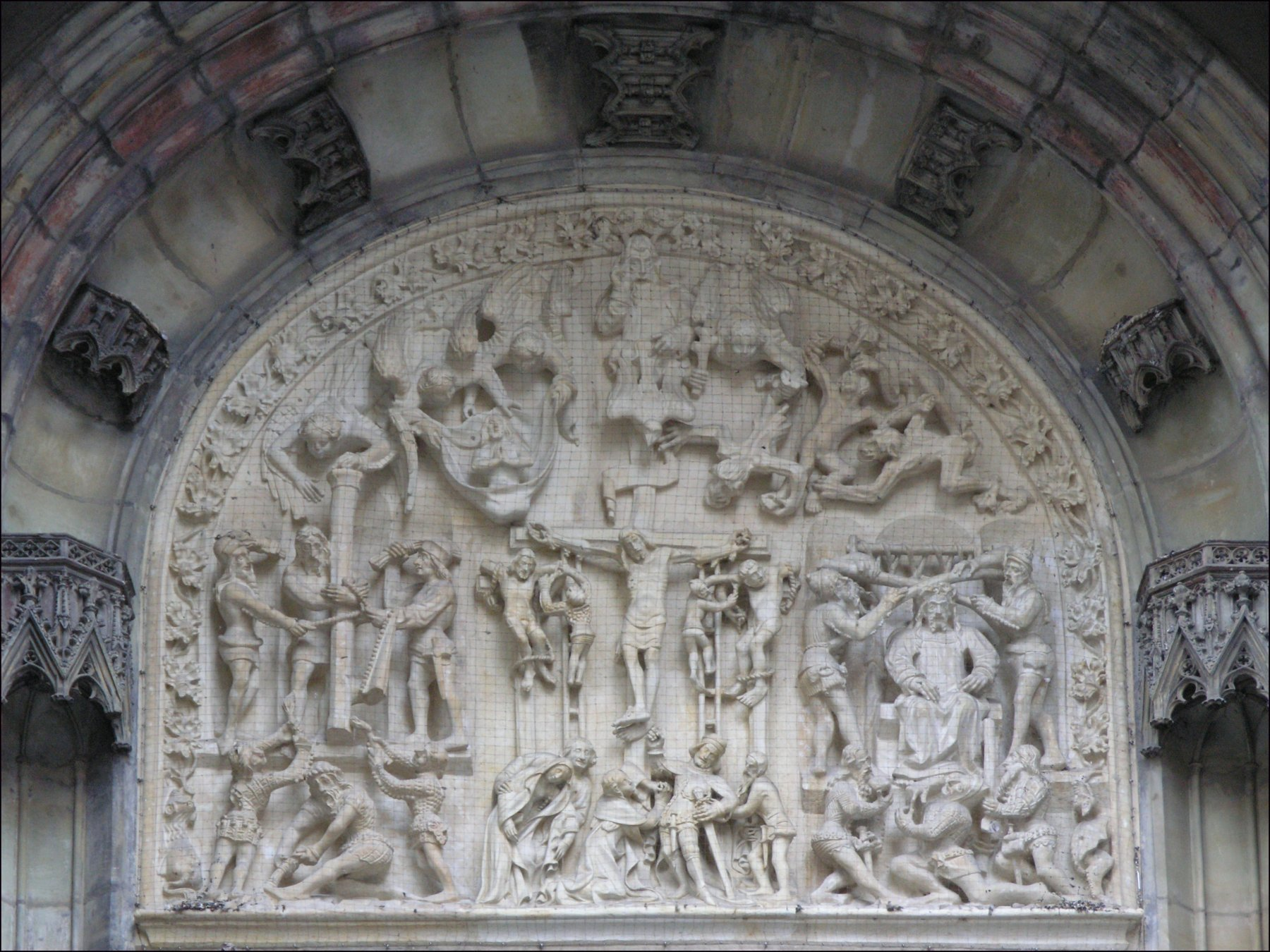
Copy of Gothic tympanon Passion of Jesus (1380), Church of Our Lady before Týn

=== Medallists' work ===
Seifert discovered a slate quarry while working as a labourer on a road construction site near Železný Brod. It is a fragile, non-sculptural material that requires very fine tools to work, but its colour and layering make it excellent for creating small relief objects such as plaquettes and medals. For Seifert they became part of his jewellery making and he made some of them as pendants. The first medals from the 1960s were a kind of analogue of slate writing plaques and contained mainly texts of proverbs. A series of abstractly erotic reliefs dates from the early 1970s, which then appear in variations in his later work.

Over time, working with slate became a daily necessity for Seifert, especially a kind of poetic diary entries (Poster of St. Margarethen, 1969, Autumn, 1979, Draining the Pond, 1983). They served as an alternative to sculptural drawings or were created as memorials (Mourning for Jaroslav Seifert, 1986). Many were created as gifts for family members, friends and acquaintances (Medal for Adriena, 1980s). He often made them during winter, when it was impossible to work outside. The frequent motifs were notes from poetry readings and thus represent a parallel between Seifert's sculpture and the works of his favourite poets. He is also the designer of a commemorative medal marking the 150th anniversary of the National Museum Journal.

=== Drawings ===
Seifert had been drawing since childhood and demonstrated his drawing skills while studying in Jan Bauch's drawing courses or copying French Renaissance drawings. Sculptural drawings became an integral part of his work and accompany Seifert's diary entries as small sketches. When they were created independently, they were not usually a search for a sculptural form, but usually a sketchy record of a finished work. They are executed in pencil, ink or sepia and washed-out with tea, and are characterised by a very plastic volume. Most of his drawings were made in the late 1990s, when his health severely limited his ability to work with stone. A large number of the drawings was destroyed or severely damaged during the catastrophic floods of Prague of 2002.

=== Awards ===
- 1966 Biennial of Youth in Paris 1st prize for teamwork
- 1969 Triennial of Sculpture in Cheb (Plague Column) 2nd prize in sculpture
- 1992 Fanano Sculpture Symposium (Modena), 1st Critics' Prize

=== Representation in collections ===
- National Gallery Prague
- Prague City Gallery
- Moravian Gallery in Brno
- Museum of Art Olomouc
- Regional Gallery in Liberec
- North Bohemian Gallery of Fine Arts in Litoměřice
- Gallery of the Central Bohemian Region (GASK), Kutná Hora
- Art Gallery Karlovy Vary
- Gallery Klatovy/Klenová
- Gallery of Fine Arts, Ostrava
- Regional Gallery of the Highlands in Jihlava
- Benedikt Rejt Gallery
- West Bohemia Gallery in Plzeň
- Museum Kampa
- British Museum
- Museum Bochum

=== Realizations ===
- 1969 Bell Tower for Jan Palach, Sankt Margarethen im Burgenland
- 1971 Mensa for the Church of the Brethren, Horní Jasenka near Vsetín
- 1973 PRIOR sign, department store, Národní třída in Prague
- 1981 Space in honour of architect Adolf Loos, Liberec
- 1986 copy of the Gothic tympanum, Church of Our Lady before Týn, Prague
- 1991 Formen für Europa, Carrara marble, Syke-Bremen, symposium
- 1993 Column, Carrara marble, private collection, Varallo, Italy
- 1997 Fountain, Czech Cultural Centre, Paris
- 1998–2003 Fountain, Kounic Palace, Prague

== Sources ==
=== Monographs ===
- Jiri Seifert: sochy,, text Olga Malá, 72 p., North Bohemian Gallery of Fine Arts in Litoměřice, 2013.
- Jitka Hlaváčková, Marie Kratochvílová (eds.), Sochař / Sculptor Jiří Seifert, 272 s., poblished by Arthouse Hejtmánek, Gallery and auction house, Prague 2019, ISBN 978-80-907493-0-6

=== Catalogues ===
- Jiří Seifert: Sochy a kresby / Sculptures and drawings, 1966, cat. 12 p., Galerie Václava Špály, Prague
- Jiří Seifert: Sochy, kameny / Sculptures, stones 1984, cat. 16 p., Atrium na Žižkově, Prague
- Jiří Seifert: Skulptura / Sculpture, 1989, texts Malá O, Mataré E, Seifert J, cat. 36 p., Old Town Hall, 2nd floor, Prague
- Jiří Seifert: Skulpturen, 1992, Spielmann P (ed.), cat. 94 p., cz., de., Museum Bochum, ISBN 3-8093-0173-6
- Jiří Seifert: Sochy / Sculptures, 1993, text Malá O, Lang Č, (interview with Jiří Seifert), cat. 74 p., North Bohemian Gallery of Fine Arts in Litoměřice ISBN 80-85090-14-7
- Jiří Seifert: Vertikála / Vertical, 1994, Raimanová I , cat. 24 p., Starý královský palác, Jižní dvorec, Praha
- Jiří Seifert: Sochy / Sculptures, 1997, cat. 24 p., FF UK, Praha
- Jiří Seifert: Sochy, kresby / Sculptures and Drawings, 1998, Bouzek J, Zemina J, cat. 28 p., Dům umění města Brna, ISBN 80-7009-107-X
- Jiří Seifert: Sochy, kresby / Sculptures and Drawings 1989 – 1999, 2000, Petrová E, cat. 16 p., cs., en., Gema Art – Gema gallery, Prague, ISBN 80-86087-29-8
- Jiří Seifert: Sochy / Sculpture, 2001, Neumann I, Hájek Miroslava, ČMVU Praha, ISBN 80-7056-089-4 (portrait B. Holomíček)
- Jiří Seifert: Kresby / Drawings, 2002, Horyna M, cat. 10+16 inserted leafs, Gallery of Fine Arts in Cheb
- Jiří Seifert: Medaile a kresby / Medals and drawings, 2002, Řeháková N, cat. 12 p., Regional Gallery Liberec, West bohemian Gallery in Plzeň, ISBN 80-85050-30-7
- Jiří Seifert: V kameni i v kresbě / In stone and drawing, 2007, Koval M, Seifert J, cat. 8 p., Jiří Jílek Gallery, Šumperk

=== Encyclopedia ===
- Československý biografický slovník / Czechoslovak biographical dictionary, Academia, Prague 1992
- Kdo je kdo v české republice 94/95 / Who is who in Czech Republic, Modrý jezdec, Prague 1994
- Horová A (ed.), Nová encyklopedie českého výtvarného umění N-Ž / The New Encyclopedia of Czech Fine Arts: N–Ž, text Olga Malá, pp. 726–727, Academia, Prague 1995, ISBN 80-200-0522-6
- Český biografický slovník XX. století / Czech Biographical Dictionary of the 20th Century, L. Horáček Paseka, P. Meissner Prague and Litomyšl, 1999
- Pavliňák P (ed.), Slovník českých a slovenských výtvarných umělců / Dictionary of Czech and Slovak Visual Artists VIII, pp. 316-317, Výtvarné centrum Chagall, Ostrava 2004, ISBN 80-86171-19-1

=== Collective publications ===
- Sculpture 1964, Vachtová L, 1964, Regional Gallery in Liberec
- Sculpture Balance 1955 - 65, Šetlík J, 1965, Regional Gallery of Fine Arts in Olomouc
- Sculpture tchècoslovaque de Myslbek à nos jours, Goldscheider Cécilie et al, 1968, fr., Musée Rodin (Hôtel Biron), Paris
- Sculpture and the City, Moulis J et al, 1969, Secretariat of the exhibition Sculpture and the City, Liberec
- Contemporary Czech Medal and Plaque, Exhibition of Works from 1979 - 1986, Procházka V, 1987, Czech Art Union, Prague
- Arte contemporanea ceca e slovacca 1950 - 1992, Bartošová Pinterová Z et al, 1992, no., it., Salone dell'arengo, Novara, ISBN 88-7737-145-5
- Geistes Gegenwart, Golinski H G et al., 1992, Museum Bochum, Germany, ISBN 3-8093-0158-2
- Labyrinth der Welt und Lusthaus des Herzens, Johann Amos Comenius 1592 - 1670, Brecht B et al., 1992, Museum Bochum, Germany, ISBN 3-8093-0172-8
- Česká architektura / Czech Architecture 1945-1995, Dušek K, Vrbová H (eds.), The Architects' Association, Prague, 1995
- Umění zastaveného čas / Art when time stood still, Czech art scene 1969 - 1985, Neumann I, (ed.), 1996, cat. 268 p., no., en., Czech Art University, Prague, ISBN 80-7056-050-9
- The Art of Accelerated Time, Czech Art Scene 1958-1968, Beran Z et al., 1999, cat. 147 p., no., en., ČMVU Praha
