= Joanna Troikowicz =

Polish-Swedish sculptor, designer and painter

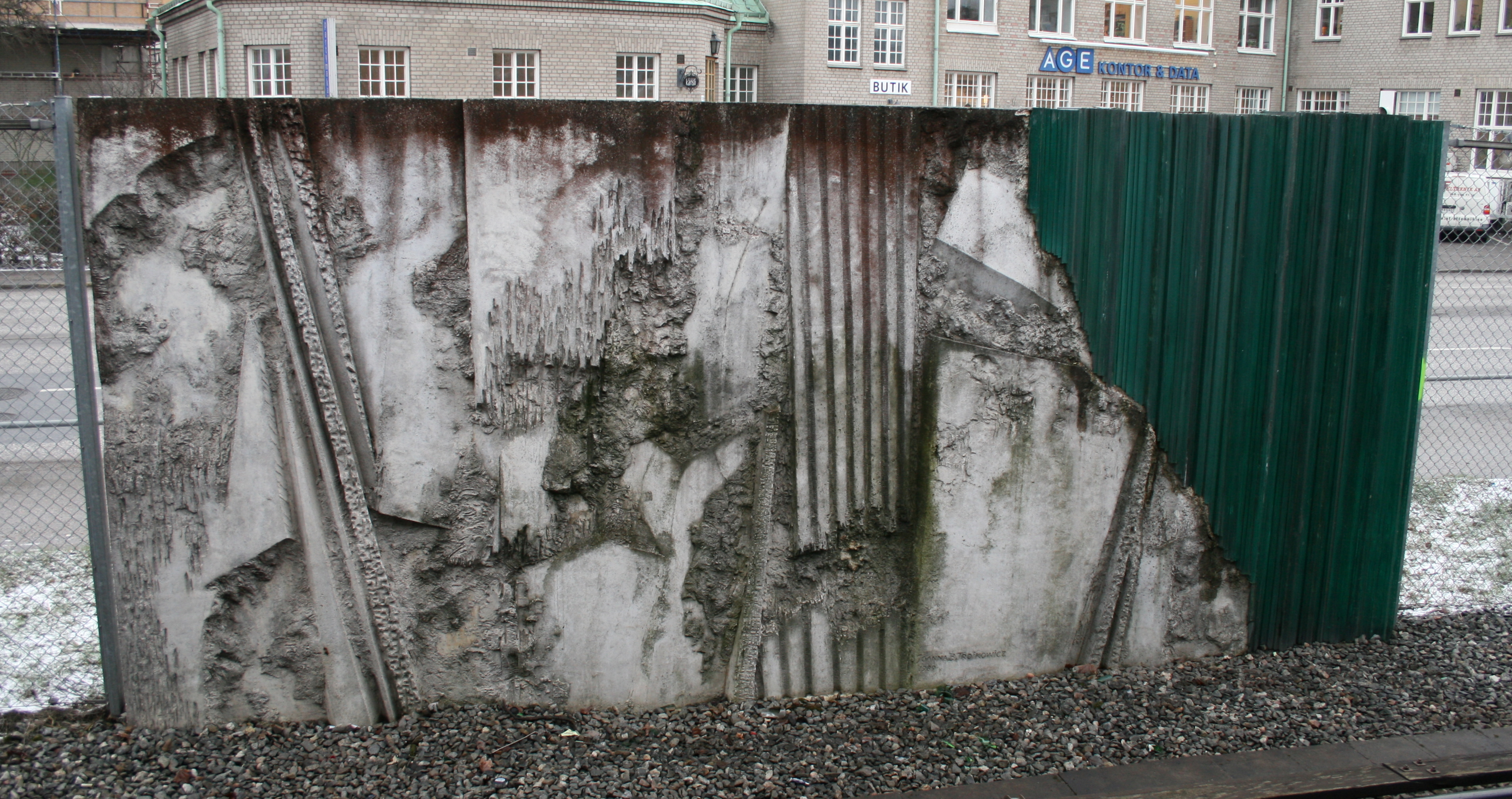
- Globen A
- Born: Joanna B. Troikowicz; 1952 (age 73–74); Kraków, Poland
- Known for: Sculpture; Design; Painting

Joanna (Balladyna) Troikowicz born 1952 in Kraków, is a Polish-Swedish sculptor, designer and painter. Since 1977 she has lived and worked in Sweden.

== Education ==
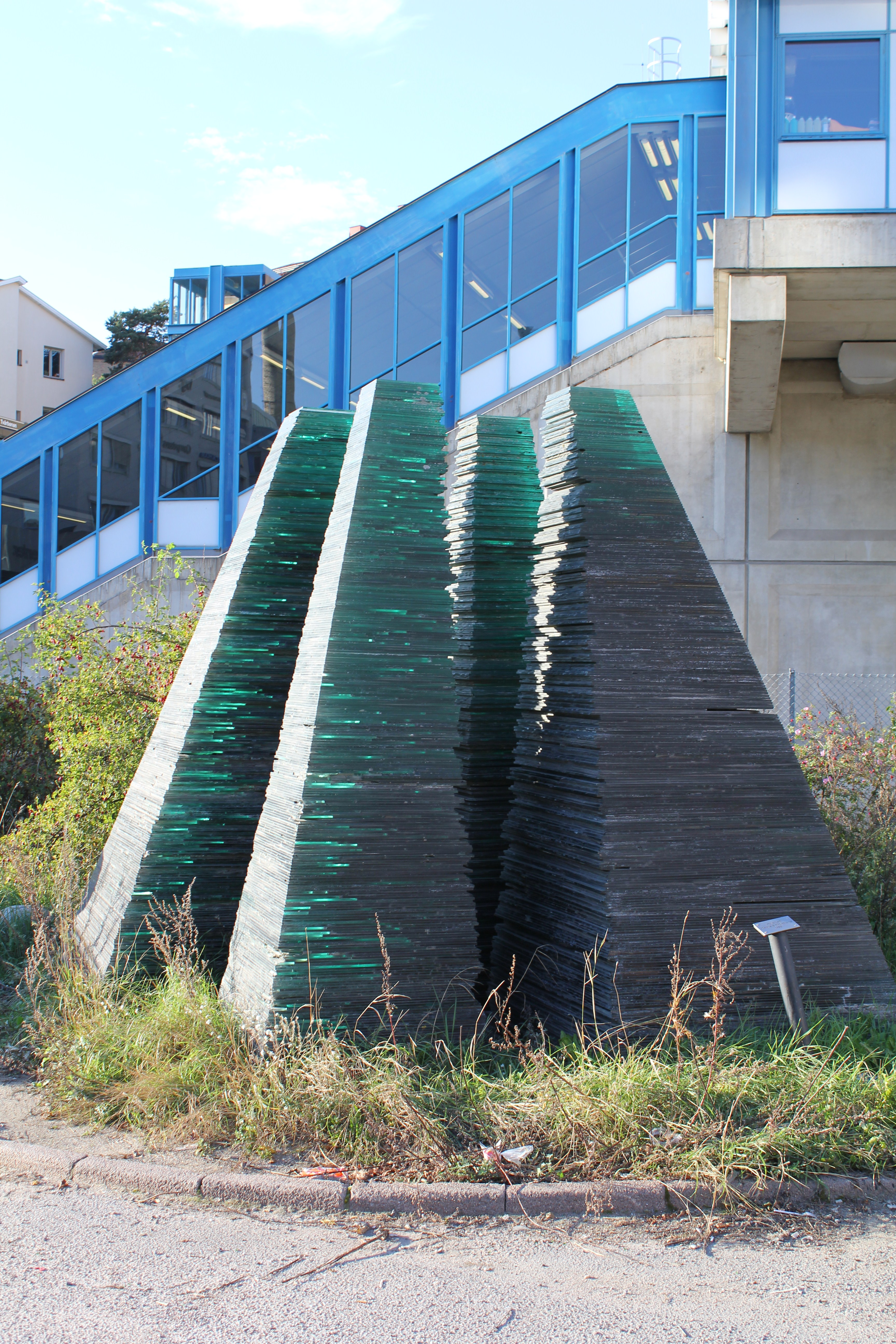
Isfantasi (Ice Fantasy), sculpture at Globen subway station i Stockholm, 1989.

- 1967 - 72 - LSP - College of Fine Arts, B.A, Cracow, -title technician decorator, extra diploma in Sculpture
- 1972 - 77 - Akademia Sztuk Pieknych - Academy of Fine Arts, Cracow, Sculpture, studio prof. M. Konieczny, Diploma- M.A
- 1975 - 77 - Studium pedagog. przy ASP, Teachers Training College for Artists, Cracow
- 1977 – 80 - Royal Academy of Fine Arts, Stockholm, Sculpture

== Awards ==
- Winner of the Grand Prix, of the Fédération Internationale de la Médaille d'Art (FIDEM), 1998, Haag, Holand,
- Innovation Prize- 1st International Biennale of Contemporary Medal of Seixal, Portugal, 1999,
- “Selezioni di Merito”- XIV Biennale Internatzionale Dantesca “Dante Europeo”, Ravenna, Italy, 2003,

== Teaching ==
- Royal Academy of Fine Arts, project assistant, research in concrete, manager of a stone cutting project at Broby, Skåne, plaster workshop -supply teacher 1981–83, curses in concrete, Employed at the Royal Academy of Fine Arts 1980 – 85
- Art School in Örebro, sculpture, drawing, April, May, 1985, Feb.1998, Sept.1999
- Art College- Konstfackskolan, course in concrete- Nov. 1986 course in patina plaster, and concrete March- Dec.1987
- Art School “Forum”, Malmö, 1987- 1991
- Teacher at the International Symposium of Medal Art- Kankaanpää, Finland, May 1999
- Teacher at the Royal Institute of Technology (KTH), architecture, construction- Feb. 2000
- Teacher at Art School (Folhögskolan), Åland, 2001, 2002

== Public Commissions ==
- Sculpture in the park, Ostrowiec, Poland 1974
- Sculpture for Military Hospital, Cracow 1975
- Entrance to Spånga Health Centre 1985
- Two entrances in buildings, Södermalm, Stockholm 1986, 1987
- Yard in Södermalm, Stockholm 1987
- Decoration –wall for the Metro Station “Globen”(competition) 1988, made 1989
- Entrance to Solna Health Centre 1990
- “Rydaholm’s Ell”, sculpture for Rydaholm, Värnamo Municipality 1991
- Five sculptures “Playing Cards” for Älvsjöbadet, Stockholm, 1991, made 1992
- Sculpture “The Anchor” for Hanninge Hospital 1994
- “The Realm of the See”, reliefs in marble of nine entrances at Hammarby's new housing estate, Stockholm, 1994, made 1995

== Represented ==
Sources:

- Muzeum Sztuki Medalierskiej, The Modern Museum of Medals, Wroclaw, Poland, 1979
- Stockholm Municipality, Stockholm's City Council
- Örebro City Council, The County Art Council's
- Kungl. Myntkabinettet, (The Royal Coin Cabinet), Stockholm
- The British Museum (Department of Coins and Medals), London, Great Britain
- Museum Minci a Medali, Kremnica, Slovakia, 2000

== Private Collections ==
Poland, Sweden, Finland, Japan, France, Italy, Slovakia, USA,
