= British Numismatic Trade Association =

Trade association

The British Numismatic Trade Association (BNTA) is an association formed by a majority of the leading United Kingdom coin dealers. Originally formed to represent the trade in discussions with UK Customs & Excise regarding value-added tax on coins, it has developed, becoming a part of the fight against forgery, theft and other criminal activities. This helped to establish a benchmark for the highest ethical standards in the domestic coin trade. Members adhere to a strict code of ethics which is a benchmark for the trade. Members receive early warning notices of counterfeit coins and stolen property. The BNTA organise the biggest International coin and medal bourse in the UK called COINEX which is held in late September or early October in Mayfair, London annually and it hosts up to 100 British and foreign dealers for a two-day show, this event promotes a range of auction in London during the preceding week and sales can top £10 million during that week..

The BNTA is a member of FENAP, the Federation of European Numismatic Associations.
