= Federation of European Numismatic Associations =

The Federation of European Numismatic Trade Associations (FENAP) is an organisation of national numismatic trade associations from multiple European countries. It was founded in 1991 and is a member of the International Numismatic Council (INC). The BNTA is the UK member.
