= Turkish Numismatic Society =

Organization in Turkey

Turkish Numismatic Association (TND) is the numismatics association founded on 9 May 1968 in Turkey.

== History ==
Its first president is Nuri Pere. In addition, Istanbul Archaeology Museums directors Cevriye Artuk and İbrahim Artuk also took part in the founding team. The association, which started to hold its first meetings in the Library of the Archeology Museum, soon started publishing and made a name for itself with the seminars and conferences it gave. He joined the International Numismatics Conference in 1973 and started to represent Turkey abroad. With the decision of the Council of Ministers on 8 July 1974, it was allowed to put the word "Turk" at the beginning of the association's name. On March 13, 1975, upon the request of the Istanbul Criminal Court of First Instance, he started to attend the courts as an expert in order to express his opinion on the numismatics issues in the cases.

TND, whose main purpose is to develop coin collecting in Turkey and to take initiative in all kinds of organizations and activities in this direction, has so far published 42 bulletins and 10 special bulletins and hosted many conferences and seminars. People such as Cüneyt Ölçer, Sevgi Gönül served as the chairman. As of 2023, its current president is Cem Mahruki.
