= Fédération internationale de la médaille d'art =

International Art Medal Federation
- Fédération Internationale de la Médaille d'Arte
- Formation: 1937; 89 years ago
- Type: Professional association
- President: Philip Attwood
- Website: www.fidem-medals.org

The Fédération internationale de la médaille d'art (English: International Art Medal Federation), also known by the acronym FIDEM, is a professional association of international scope dedicated to the practice and promotion of artistic medallic art.

The organization is chaired by the British numismatist Philip Attwood.

== History ==
FIDEM was founded in Paris in 1937 as an instrument for the promotion and dissemination of the art of medal engraving at the international level, ensuring its recognition and consideration among other artistic modalities, mainly through publications and through the organization of international events.

Its members range from medalist artists to institutions such as museums, mints, foundations, libraries, associations, sector companies, and universities worldwide.

== Operation ==
The International Art Medal Federation operates in around 40 countries, where it has the figure of a delegate and a vice-delegate who maintain regular contacts with affiliated artists and with other individuals and entities related in one way or another to medallic art.

Among its main events, FIDEM organizes a biennial international congress and exhibition on the art of the medal, during which contacts and exchanges of ideas among artists of this specialty take place. The XXXV congress, corresponding to 2018, took place in Ottawa, Canada.

On the occasion of each congress-exhibition, the organization has been publishing since 1938 the magazine Médailles, distributed free of charge among its members, which, among other information, gathers articles about the topics addressed in the congress and about the medals presented in the exhibition.

== FIDEM Awards ==
=== FIDEM Grand Prix ===
At the congress held in London in 1992, the FIDEM Grand Prix was instituted, which is awarded to one of the medals presented at each of the biennial international exhibitions, after its examination by a jury chosen by the Executive and Advisory Committee of the organization, which follows criteria predetermined by it. The identity of the winners is known in each case during the closing ceremony of each congress, when the award is presented.

These are the winners of the award:

- 1992: Maria Lugossy (Hungary).
- 1994: Magdalena Dobrucka (Poland).
- 1996: Guus Hellegers (Netherlands).
- 1998: Joanna Troikowicz (Sweden).
- 2000: Tibor Budahelyi (Hungary).
- 2002: Bernd Göbel (Germany).
- 2004: Elisabeth Varga (Netherlands).
- 2007: Helder Batista (Portugal).
- 2010: Elly Baltus (Netherlands).
- 2012: Tetsuji Seta (Japan).
- 2014: Irina Suvorova (Russia).
- 2016: Ron Dutton (Great Britain)
- 2018: Mashiko Nakashima (Japan).
- 2021: Michael Meszaros (Australia)

=== FIDEM AT 70 Award ===
This award was instituted in 2007 to commemorate the 70th anniversary of the organization. It is awarded to one or several individuals who stand out for their support to the world of the medal.

Since its creation, more than thirty artists have been awarded this prize. In its 2018 edition, the Canadians Lynden Beesley, Susan Taylor, Lorraine Wright, Michael Groves, and David Dunlop were awarded.

== See also ==
- Numismatic associations
