= Hellenic Numismatic Society =

The Hellenic Numismatic Society (HNS) was founded in 1970 with the purpose of promoting interest in numismatics and the study of coins, medals, banknotes, and related objects among both Greek and international researchers and collectors. Its primary academic publication, Nomismatika Khronika (Numismatic Chronicles), has been published annually since 1972.

== Mission ==
The Society’s mission is to advance the study of Greek coinage across all historical periods, encourage collaboration among scholars, and disseminate numismatic knowledge to the public through lectures, conferences, and educational activities. The Nomismatika Khronika journal includes articles by both Greek and foreign scholars, covering a wide range of numismatic topics—from ancient Greek coinage to modern monetary history.

== Activities ==
A notable aspect of the Society’s activity is its publication of monographs and collective volumes focusing on specific regions or chronological periods of Greek numismatics. Examples include The Depictions of Ancient Gods on the Coinage of Constantine the Great (306–326 AD), In Memory of Martin Jessop Price, and The Coinage of the Roman Colony of Dion —all published by the Society and available with ISBN registration.

The Society also maintains strong connections with museums, universities, and private collections. A relevant example is the Alpha Bank Numismatic Collection, established in 1972, which contains approximately 11,000 ancient coins and 2,000 modern coins and banknotes of the Greek state. The collection has collaborated with the Hellenic Numismatic Society in catalogues, exhibitions, and academic projects, reflecting the Society’s integrative role in promoting numismatic research and heritage.

Another distinctive feature is the bilingual character of its publications. Articles in Nomismatika Khronika are typically written in Greek or English, often accompanied by abstracts or summaries in the other language. This bilingualism fosters international collaboration and ensures broader dissemination of research.

== Challenges ==
Despite its achievements, the Hellenic Numismatic Society faces challenges common to many academic associations: securing consistent funding for publications and conferences, engaging younger scholars, and embracing digital transformation. Digitizing its archives and providing open online access to its journal and monographs would significantly expand its reach and impact.

== Bibliography ==
- Alpha Bank Numismatic Collection. (2023). 50 years of the Alpha Bank Numismatic Collection. Alpha Bank Cultural Center. Retrieved October 15, 2025, from https://www.alphapolitismos.gr/en/news-and-activities/exhibition-celebrating-50-year-anniversary-numismatic-collection/
- Biblionet. (n.d.). Οι μορφές των αρχαίων θεών στη νομισματοκοπία του Μεγάλου Κωνσταντίνου (306–326 μ.Χ.) The Depictions of Ancient Gods on the Coinage of Constantine the Great (306–326 AD)]. Hellenic Numismatic Society. ISBN 978-960-85522-6-5
- Biblionet. (n.d.). Μνήμη Martin Jessop Price [In Memory of Martin Jessop Price]. Hellenic Numismatic Society. ISBN 978-960-85522-5-8
- Biblionet. (n.d.). Η νομισματοκοπία της ρωμαϊκής αποικίας του Δίου [The Coinage of the Roman Colony of Dion]. Hellenic Numismatic Society. ISBN 978-960-85522-4-1
- Census of Modern Greek Literature. (n.d.). Nomismatika Khronika (ISSN 1105-8579). University of Minnesota. Retrieved October 15, 2025, from https://moderngreekliterature.org/journals/21
- Newman Numismatic Portal. (2009). Hellenic Numismatic Society: founding, journal “Nomismatika Khronika.” Washington University in St. Louis. Retrieved October 15, 2025, from https://nnp.wustl.edu/Library/Periodical/10222
- SearchCulture.gr. (n.d.). Nomismatika Khronika. Hellenic Numismatic Society. Retrieved October 15, 2025, from https://www.searchculture.gr/aggregator/edm/ELIA/000100-33_352202
