= Jan Bauch =

Jan Bauch (16 November 1898 in Prague – 9 January 1995) was a Czech painter and sculptor.

== Life ==
Bauch was born on 16 November 1898 in Prague. He graduated from the School of Applied Arts and at the Academy of Fine Arts in 1924 (studied under Max Švabinský). He devoted himself to painting, drawing, illustration, printmaking, sculpture, and worked on the windows in St. Vitus Cathedral.

His paintings were painted strongly in the Czech Baroque style, with excitement and rhythm using brush strokes and layering, with dramatic contrasts and although colorful did not reflect optimism. Rather, tragedy and bitterness.

== See also ==
- List of Czech painters
