= Sarah Siddons (disambiguation) =

Sarah Siddons (1755–1831) was a Welsh-born stage actress, the best-known tragedienne of the 18th century.

Sarah Siddons may also refer to:

- Sarah Siddons (horse), a racehorse
- Sarah Siddons (locomotive), an electric locomotive on the London Underground from 1923 to 1962
- Sarah Siddons as the Tragic Muse, a 1784 painting by Joshua Reynolds

== See also ==
- Sarah Siddons Award
- Sarah Siddons Society
