= Statue of Sarah Siddons =

Statue in London, England

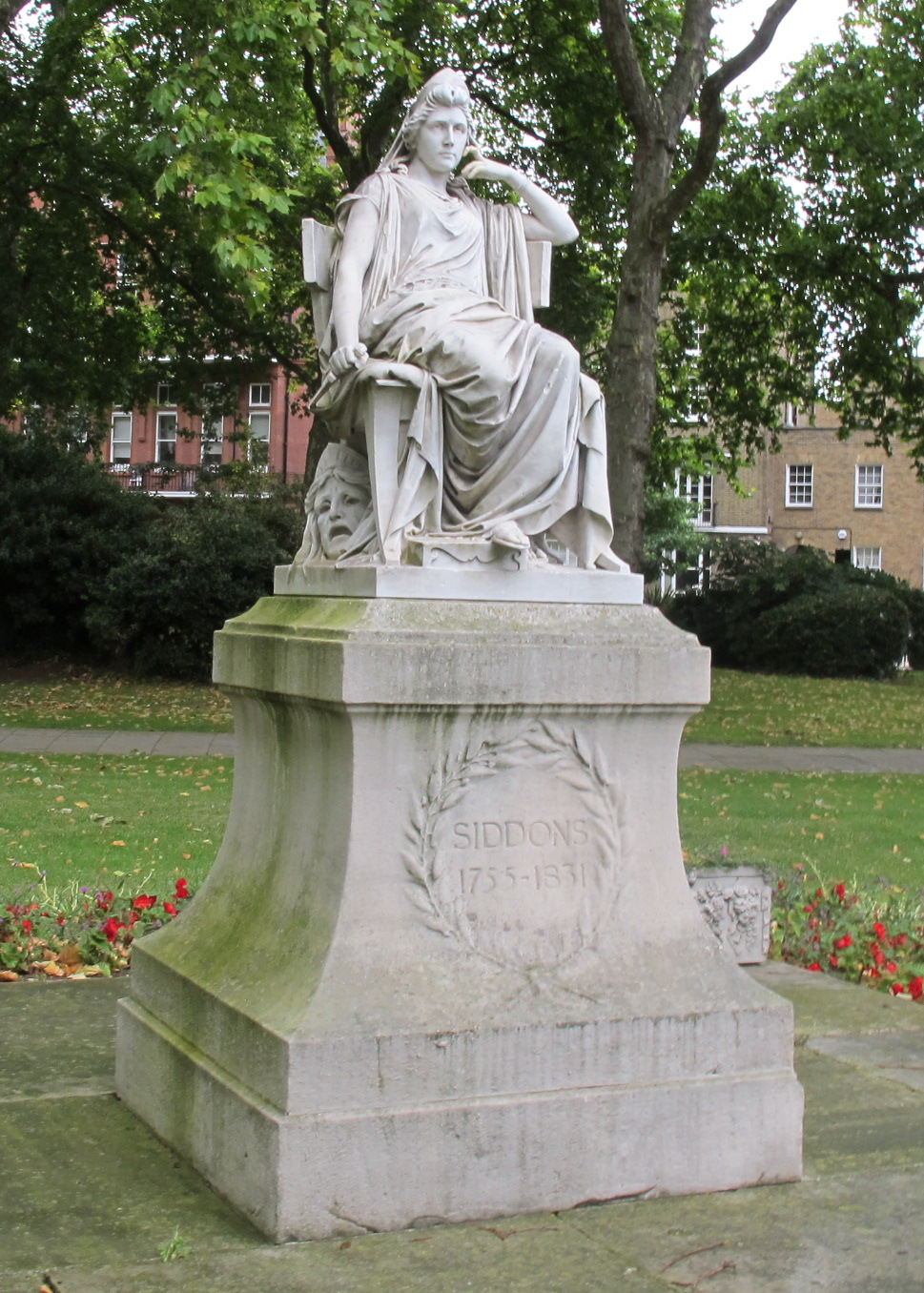
- Artist: Léon-Joseph Chavalliaud
- Year: 1897
- Medium: Sculpture
- Location: Paddington Green, London

The Statue of Sarah Siddons is an 1897 marble sculpture by the French artist Léon-Joseph Chavalliaud located on Paddington Green near to the Harrow Road in the City of Westminster. It depicts the British stage actress Sarah Siddons (1755–1831), the leading tragedienne of the later Georgian era.

A member of the Kemble family, she is buried in the nearby St Mary's Church. Her pose is based on that of her 1784 portrait painting Sarah Siddons as the Tragic Muse by Joshua Reynolds. It was unveiled by the actor Henry Irving on 14 June 1897. It has been Grade II listed since 1951. In 1952 Sybil Thorndyke led a campaign to restore the statue and it received further restoration work in 2019.

It was the first statue in London to commemorate a woman outside of the royal family.

== Bibliography ==
- Bennett, Shelley, Leonard, Mark & West, Shearer. A Passion for Performance: Sarah Siddons and her Portraitists. Getty Publications, 1999.
- Pascoe, Judith. The Sarah Siddons Audio Files: Romanticism and the Lost Voice. University of Michigan Press, 2011.
- Ritchie, Fiona. Shakespeare in the Theatre: Sarah Siddons and John Philip Kemble. Bloomsbury Publishing, 2022.
