= City of Westminster College =

Coordinates: 51.5208°N 0.1728°W

Location
- Paddington Green; London, W2 1NB; England

Information
- Type: Further Education
- Motto: "City of Westminster College will provide outstanding education and training to enable our learners to achieve their full potential"
- Established: 1904 – Paddington Technical Institute; 2017 – constituent college of United Colleges Group
- Local authority: Westminster
- Department for Education URN: 130423 Tables
- Ofsted: Reports
- Principal: Stephen Davis
- Gender: Mixed
- Age: 14 to no upper age limit
- Enrolment: 9,000 (United Colleges Group, 2019)
- Website: www.cwc.ac.uk

City of Westminster College is a further education college in the City of Westminster, Greater London, England, founded originally as Paddington Technical Institute in 1904 and gaining its current name in 1990. The college has two centres in central London, located in Paddington and Maida Vale. It also includes the Cockpit Theatre, a fully operational studio theatre used for training and performances, and a range of outreach centres. Since 2017, it is legally merged with the College of North West London (CNWL) although remains publicly distinct; together the United Colleges Group has more than 9,000 enrolled students as of 2019, most in young or adult study programmes and some in apprenticeships.

== Courses and specialisms ==
The college offers a broad mix of vocational and academic courses, including BTEC, City & Guilds and NVQ qualifications, GCSEs and A levels. It also provides a smaller range of higher education courses such as Foundation and Bachelor of Science Degrees and HNCs. College specialities include Sport, Digital Media, Construction, Engineering and Science.

The college is associate partner of Middlesex University and University of Westminster. It is also part of Westminster Skillset Media Academy with University of Westminster, providing training in areas such as Sound Engineering and Digital Media.

The college is a Founder College of the National Skills Academy for Creative & Cultural for its Performing Arts and Technical Theatre training.

== Campuses and facilities ==
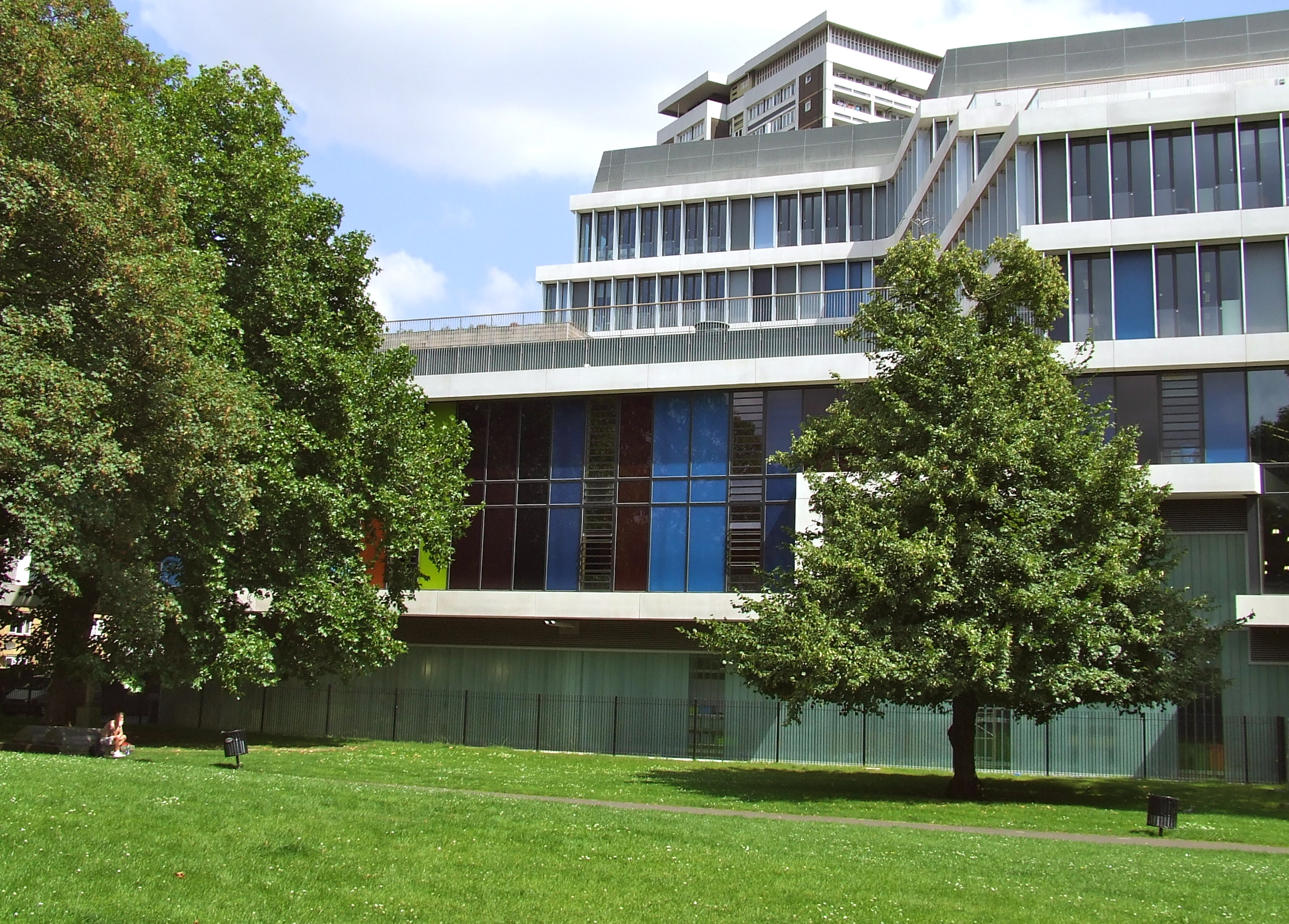
Paddington Green Campus viewed from St Mary's Gardens

City of Westminster College opened its new Paddington Green Campus in January 2011. The £102m seven-storey building replaces a 1960s construction in the same location.

Designed by Danish architects schmidt hammer lassen, Paddington Green Campus has 24,000 square metres of floor space. It includes a large central atrium at the heart of the building, accessible green roof terraces and increased community access to features such as the Sarah Siddons Theatre and public cafe overlooking St Mary's Gardens. Other facilities include a double-height Sport England-specification sports hall and specialist science labs and workshops. The campus features a mix of open-plan learning/meeting areas as well as more traditional classrooms.

City of Westminster College's Paddington Green Campus was among the winners of the RIBA Awards for London 2011. It was also among the winners of the inaugural New London Awards.

== History ==
Originally established as Paddington Technical Institute, the college celebrated its centenary in 2004. The original Institute was opened in Saltram Crescent, W9 and early courses focused on vocational subjects such as building, commerce, dressmaking and engineering.

Having previously inhabited a series of mostly Victorian buildings, the college moved to a purpose-built eight-storey site on Paddington Green in 1967, also changing its name to Paddington Technical College. Overlooking the Conservation Areas of St Mary's Gardens (a former churchyard) and Paddington Green, the building featured what were then high-specification facilities such as a bespoke vehicle workshop and rolling road.

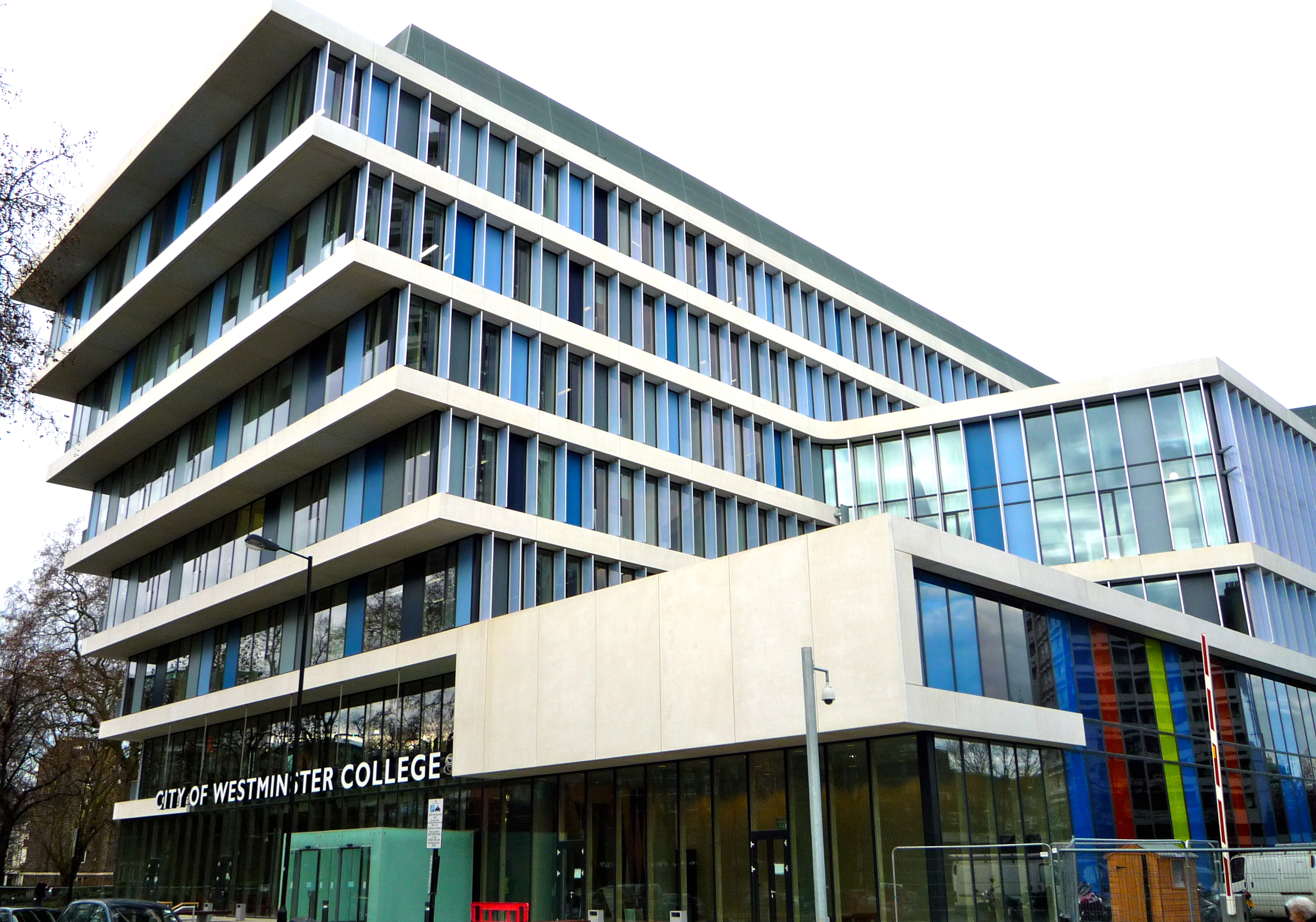
City of Westminster College's Paddington Green Campus opened in January 2011

In 1984, the institution became Paddington College to reflect the increasing variety of courses it offered. When administration of the college passed from the Inner London Education Authority (ILEA) to Westminster City Council in 1990, the college adopted its current name. On 1 April 1993, City of Westminster College became self-governing by the nationwide Further and Higher Education Act 1992.

City of Westminster College merged with the College of North West London on 1 August 2017 to form the United Colleges Group. Nick Bell, former CEO of Prospects, is now the group chief executive officer. Stephen Davis is the Group Principal of the United Colleges Group. Franklin Asante is Chair of Corporation.

In its most recent inspection, Ofsted rated the college as "Good" for overall effectiveness. https://reports.ofsted.gov.uk/provider/31/130423

== Notable alumni ==
- Ana Diamond
- Marfa Ekimova
- Jawahir Roble, MBE
