= St Mary on Paddington Green Church =

St Mary on Paddington Green
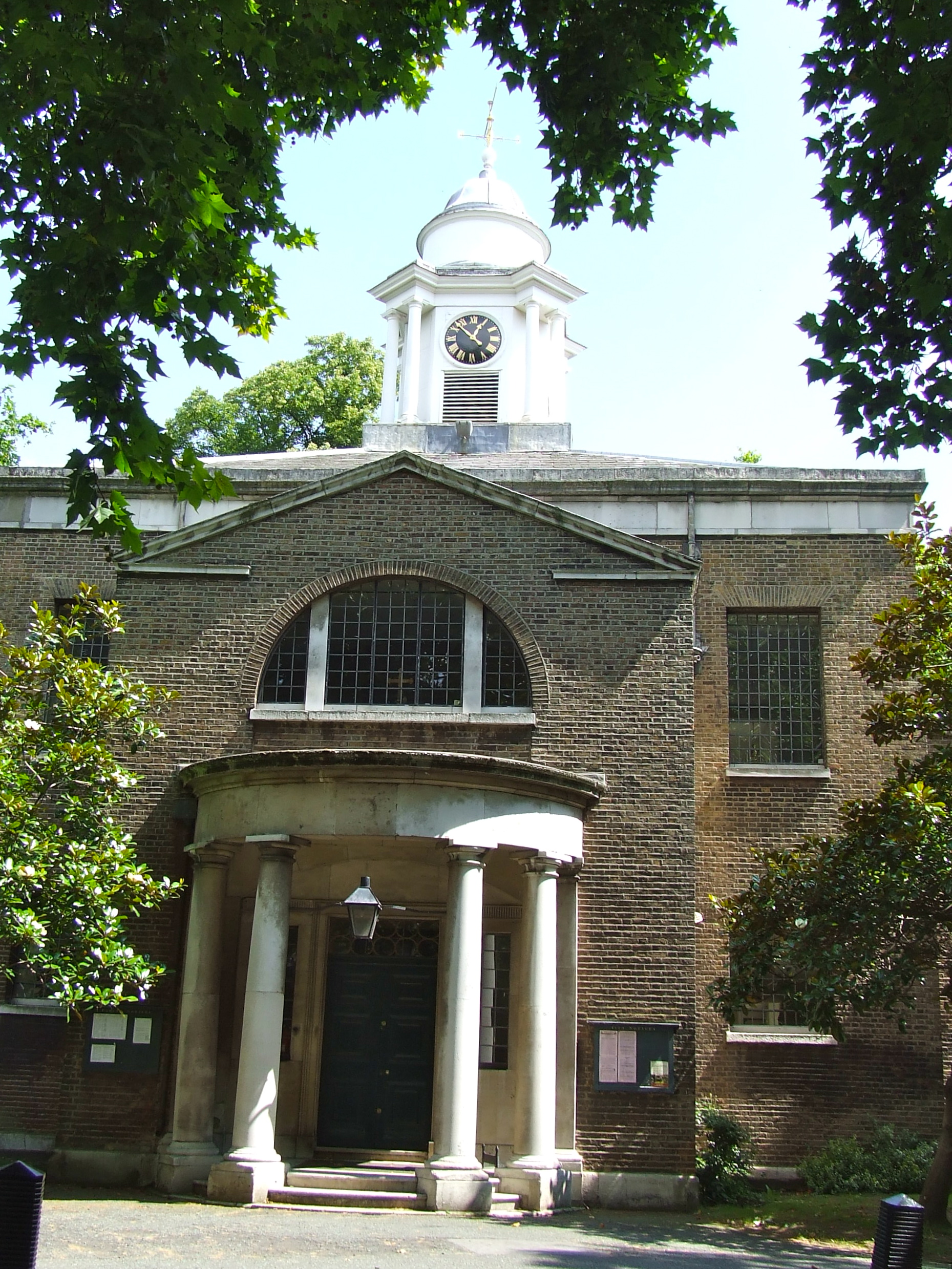
- St Mary on Paddington Green
- 51.5204°N 0.1753°W
- Location: Little Venice, London, W2 1NB
- Country: England
- Denomination: Church of England
- Churchmanship: Anglo-Catholic
- Website: parishoflittlevenice.com

History
- Status: Active

Architecture
- Functional status: Parish Church

Administration
- Diocese: Diocese of London
- Archdeaconry: Archdeaconry of Charing Cross
- Deanery: Westminster Paddington
- Parish: Little Venice

Clergy
- Bishop: The Rt Revd Sarah Mullally (Bishop of London)
- Vicar: Fr Christopher Stoltz

St Mary on Paddington Green is an Anglican church in the Parish of Little Venice, London, and forms part of Paddington Green conservation area. Today it stands at the junction of Edgware Road and Harrow Road, overlooking the East end of Westway and the approaches to Marylebone Flyover, so seen by tens of thousands of motorists daily.

== History ==
The present building is the third church on the site, once forming a centrepiece of the ancient villages of Paddington and Lilestone. John Donne preached his first sermon in the original church and William Hogarth was married in the second.

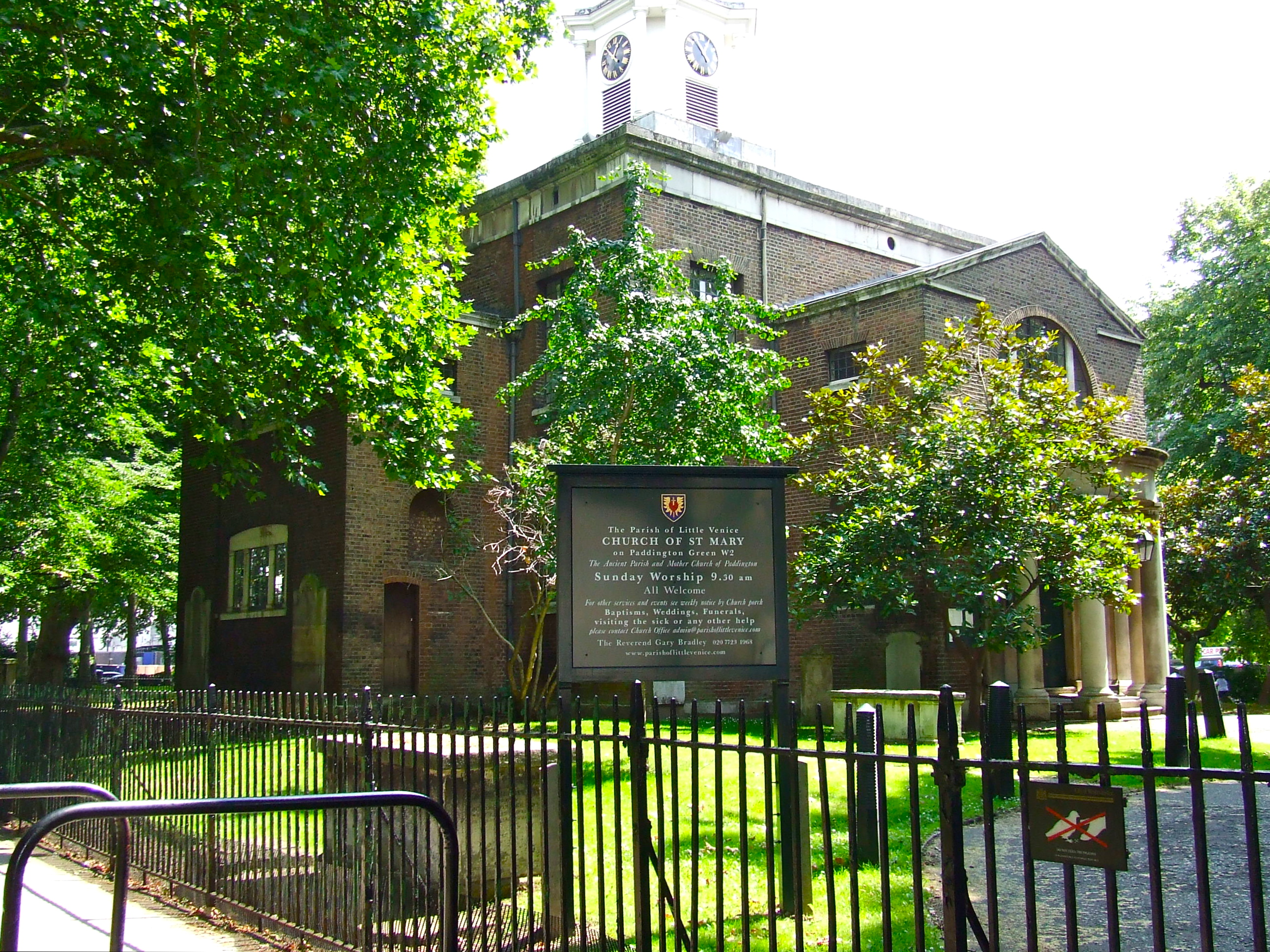
View to church from Paddington Green

The current Georgian church was commissioned in 1788 and consecrated in 1791. Designed by John Plaw with a Greek Cross ground plan, in yellow London stock brick dressed with white stone. It is one of two confirmed surviving buildings by Plaw in the UK, along with Belle Isle on Windermere. A further building in Romford, known as The Round House, has been attributed to him. John Plaw later worked in Southampton before emigrating to Canada, where he designed several public and private buildings.

The church was altered in the 19th century but was restored to its mid-Georgian appearance by architect Raymond Erith in the early 1970s using some of the compensation for the construction of the urban motorway Westway, alongside the church. Restoration included the chancel being reinstated in its original form, the nave reseated with box pews and the organ moved to the West end. The organ case is dedicated as a memorial to Erith. The church houses monuments to some of the area's residents, including sculptor Joseph Nollekens and lexicographer Peter Mark Roget.

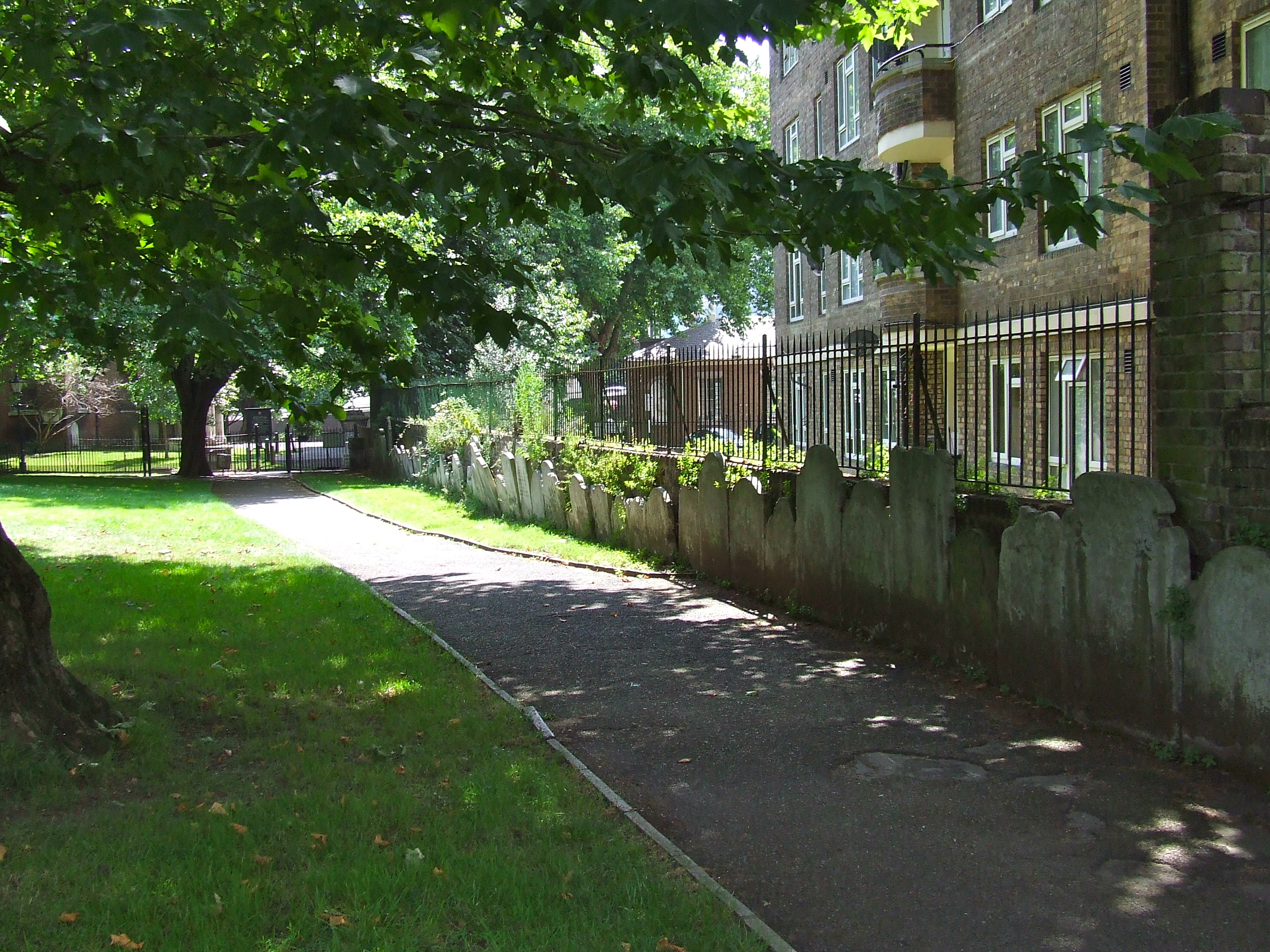
Gravestones in St Mary's Gardens

== St Mary’s Churchyard ==
The adjoining churchyard was converted to a public park in the 1890s and is now known as St Mary's Gardens. It consists of grass with scattered trees. The grave of well-known 18th-century actress Sarah Siddons is located towards the northern end. Some headstones from the former churchyard are stacked against the west wall of the Gardens.

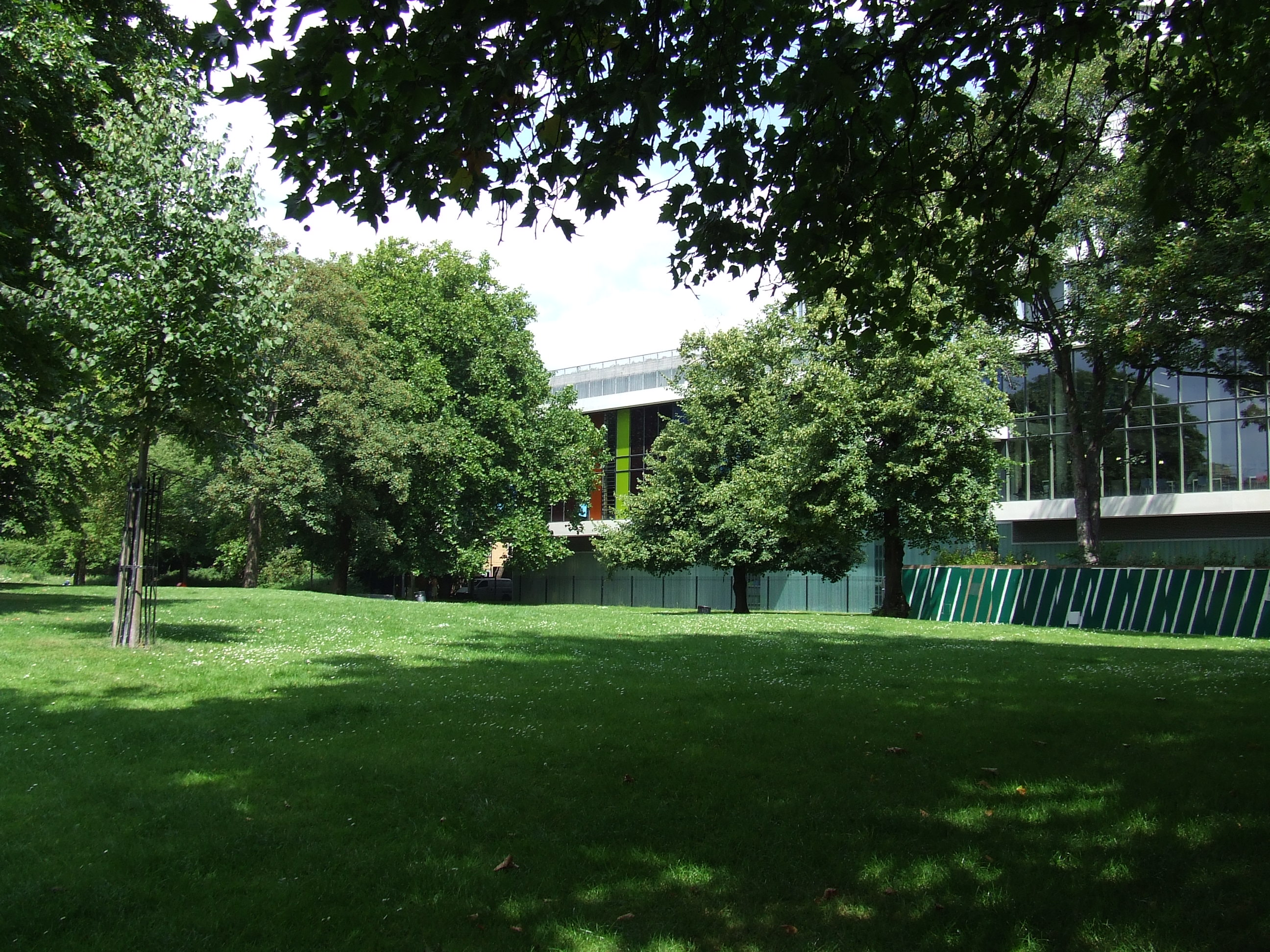
St Mary's Gardens showing view to City of Westminster College

The southern part of the churchyard was destroyed to make way for the approaches to Marylebone Flyover in 1968, with exhumed burials being reinterred in an area of Mill Hill Cemetery and marked with a plaque.

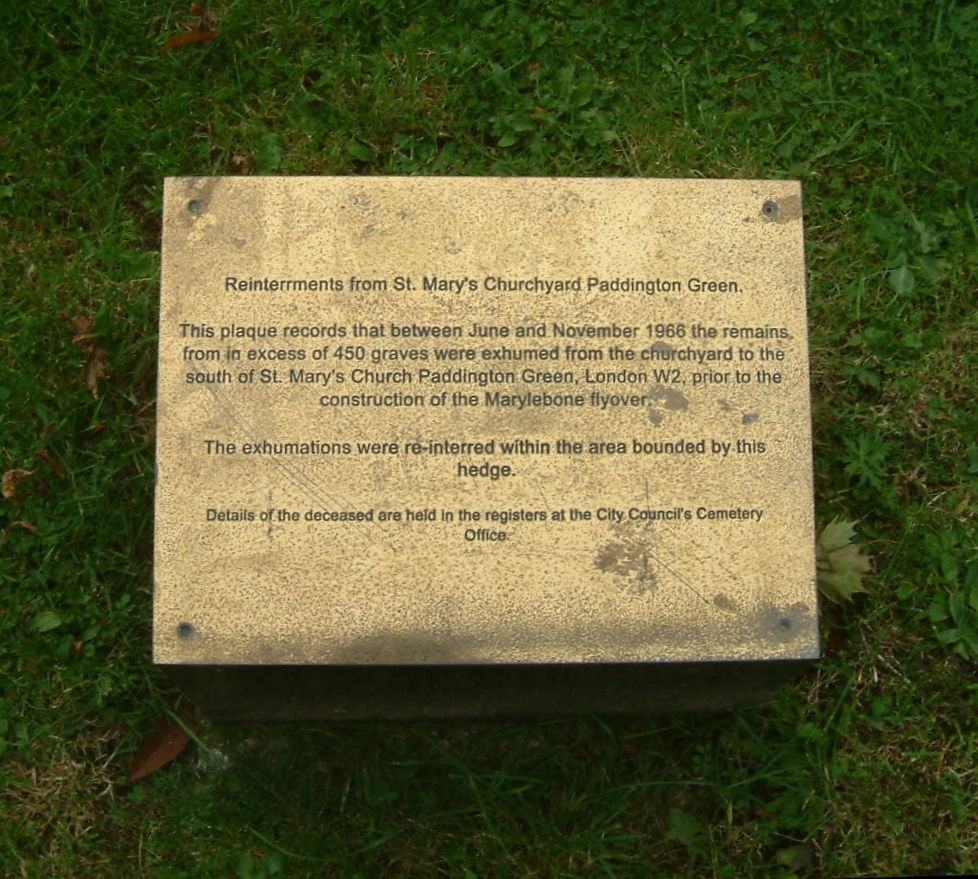
St Mary's Paddington Green, Reburials in Mill Hill Cemetery, London

== Notable burials ==
=== Remaining churchyard ===
- Mary Lawrance (1776–1845), botanical artist
- Rev Dawson Burns (1828–1909), temperance leader
- William Chandless (1829–1896), Amazon explorer
- Rev Alexander Geddes (1737–1802), Biblical scholar
- Basil Woodd (1760–1831), hymn writer (erected by the Crosse baronets)
- Leonard Charles Wyon (1826–1891), engraver and coin-designer
- Sir Stephen Spender (1909–1995), poet
- John Julius Norwich (1929–2018), historian, writer, and television personality

=== St Mary's Gardens ===
- Thomas Banks (1735–1805), sculptor
- Thomas Blore (1754–1818), historian
- William Collins RA (1788–1847), artist
- Matthew Dubourg (1703–1767), violinist
- Benjamin Haydon, (1786–1846) painter
- Joseph Nollekens (1737–1823), sculptor, and his father, Joseph Francis Nollekens, artist
- Emma Paterson (1846–1886), feminist and trade unionist
- Thomas Richmond (1771–1837), miniaturist
- Sarah Siddons (1755–1831), actress
- Charles Stedman (1753–1812), army officer

== See also ==
- 18th-century Western domes
