= Sarah Siddons as the Tragic Muse =

Painting by Joshua Reynolds

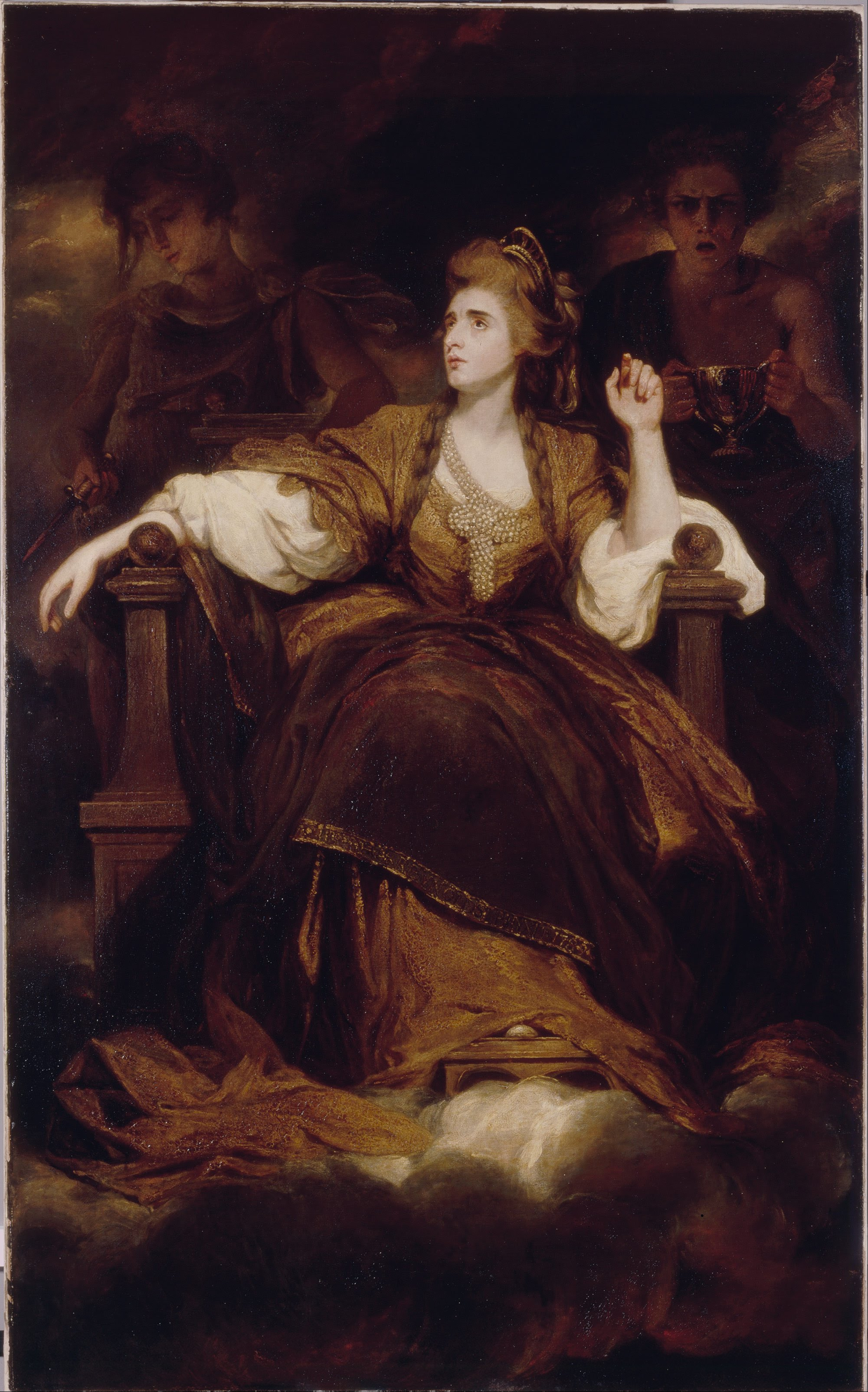
- Artist: Joshua Reynolds
- Year: 1783–1784
- Medium: oil on canvas
- Dimensions: 239.4 cm × 147.64 cm (94.25 in × 58.125 in)
- Location: Huntington Library, Art Museum and Botanical Gardens; San Marino, California

Sarah Siddons as the Tragic Muse, or Mrs. Siddons as the Tragic Muse, is a 1783–1784 painting by English painter Sir Joshua Reynolds. The 1784 version is in the Huntington Library art museum, while a 1789 reproduction from Reynolds's studio is in the Dulwich Picture Gallery.

== Composition ==
The painting depicts the actress Sarah Siddons as Melpomene, the muse of tragedy. Siddons wears a diadem and is dressed in an 18th-century costume adorned with pearls. She is seated on a large throne while behind her, figures personifying Pity and Terror stand in the shadows.

It provided the inspiration for Léon-Joseph Chavalliaud's 1897 marble Statue of Sarah Siddons in Paddington Green.
