= Portrait of Sarah Siddons (Gainsborough) =

Painting by Thomas Gainsborough

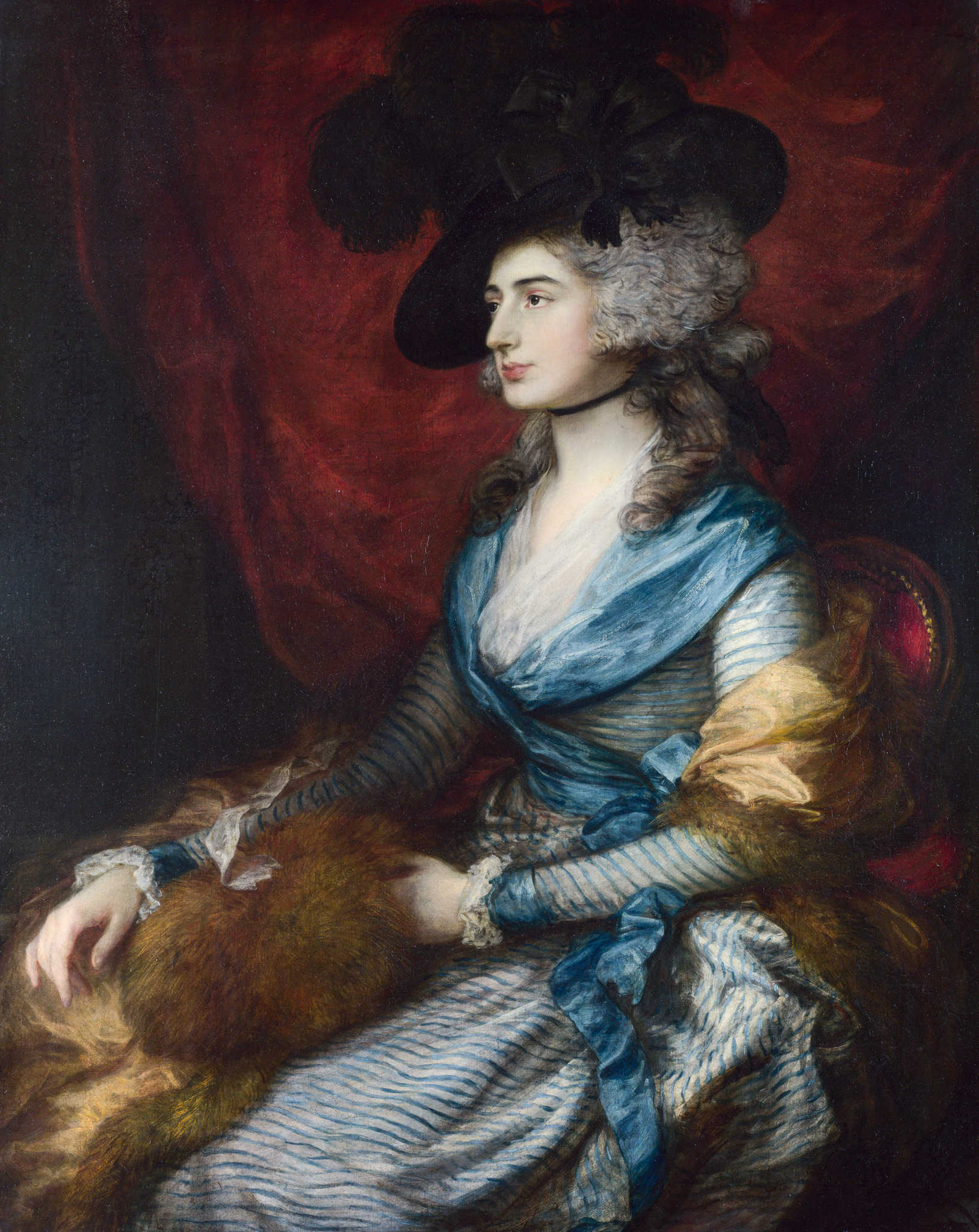
- Artist: Thomas Gainsborough
- Year: 1785
- Type: Portrait painting
- Medium: Oil on canvas
- Dimensions: 126 cm × 99.5 cm (50 in × 39.2 in)
- Location: National Gallery, London

Portrait of Sarah Siddons is an oil on canvas portrait painting by the English artist Thomas Gainsborough, from 1785. It depicts the actress Sarah Siddons, a member of the theatrical Kemble family, and the leading tragedienne on the British stage of the era. It is held in the National Gallery, in London.

== History and description ==
Both Gainsborough and Siddons had first made their names in Bath before moving to London. Siddons was frequently portrayed by artists during the period, including Joshua Reynolds and Thomas Lawrence. Unlike many of the other portraits which depict her in the role of one of the characters, this work shows her as herself in the fashionable costume of the late eighteenth century.

Sarah Siddons was a dramatic actress of the late 18th century. Gainsborough portrays her with fine detail. It is a compositional portrait framed diagonally, occupying half the surface with dynamically arranged details of clothing, alluding to the actress's tumultuous life. The other half is chromatically closed, devoid of special plastic elements, offering support for the gaze. The large black hat with feathers stands out against the background of the red curtain, reminiscent of a theater curtain.

The painting is among Gainsborough's most modern portraits. The painter does not hesitate to contrast the cool blue tones of the dress with the yellow of the shawl, the rust and brown of the fur cuff, and the red of the curtains. This association of complementary colors, along with the play of light and shadow, helps to highlight Sarah Siddons' strong personality.

The work was not commissioned and was displayed at Schomberg House in London, as Gainsborough boycotted the Royal Academy following the Exhibition of 1784. It was owned for several decades by Siddons's family. It was acquired by the National Gallery in 1862. The painting inspired the logo of the film studio Gainsborough Pictures in the 1920s.

== Bibliography ==
- Bennett, Shelley, Leonard, Mark & West, Shearer. A Passion for Performance: Sarah Siddons and her Portraitists. Getty Publications, 1999.
- Hamilton, James. Gainsborough: A Portrait. Hachette UK, 2017.
- Smith, Ian Haydn. Selling the Movie: The Art of the Film Poster. Quarto Group, 2018.
