= Gainsborough Pictures =

British film studio

Coordinates: 51.5357°N 0.0886°W

Opening logo

Gainsborough Pictures was a British film studio based on the south bank of the Regent's Canal, in Poole Street, Hoxton, London. Gainsborough Studios was active between 1924 and 1951. The company was initially based at Islington Studios, which were built as a power station for the Great Northern & City Railway and later converted to studios.

Other films were made at Lime Grove and Pinewood Studios. The former Islington studio was converted to flats in 2004 and a London Borough of Hackney historical plaque is attached to the building. The studio is best remembered for the Gainsborough melodramas it produced in the 1940s.

Gainsborough Pictures is now owned by Gregory Motton.

== History ==
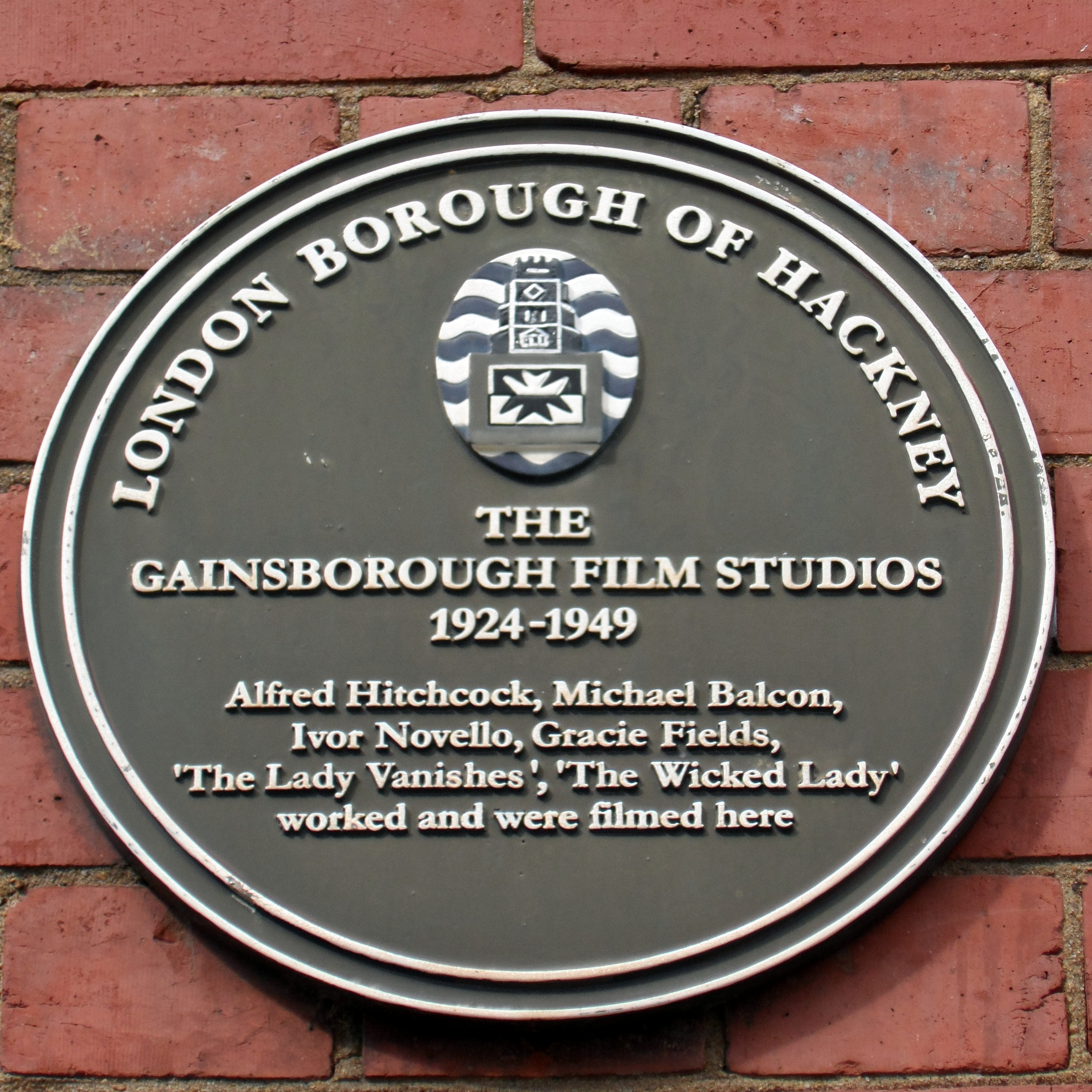
Plaque on the site that housed the Poole Street studio

Gainsborough was founded in 1924 by Michael Balcon with Graham Cutts with a capital of £100. He obtained financial backing from the Bromhead brothers of Gaumont Company off the success of Woman to Woman.

From 1927, it was a sister company to the Gaumont British, with Balcon as Director of Production for both studios. Whilst Gaumont-British, based at Lime Grove Studios in Shepherd's Bush, produced the "quality" pictures, Gainsborough mainly produced 'B' movies and melodramas at its Islington Studios. Both studios used continental film practices, especially those from Germany, with Alfred Hitchcock being encouraged by Balcon — who had links with UFA — to study there and make multilingual co-production films with UFA, before World War II. In the 1930s, actors Elisabeth Bergner and Conrad Veidt, art director Alfred Junge, cinematographer Mutz Greenbaum and screenwriter/director Berthold Viertel, along with others, joined the two studios.

The studio's opening logo, of a lady (Celia Bird then Glennis Lorimer) in a Georgian era period costume, sitting in an ornate frame, and turning and smiling, was based on the 1785 painting Portrait of Sarah Siddons by Thomas Gainsborough. The short piece of music was written by Louis Levy and called the "Gainsborough Minuet".

After the departure of Balcon to MGM-British, the Rank Organisation gained an interest in Gainsborough and the studio made such popular films as Oh, Mr Porter! (1937) and Hitchcock's The Lady Vanishes (1938). By 1937, Gaumont-British was in financial crisis, and closed its Lime Grove studios, moving all production to the Islington Poole Street studio. However, the tall factory chimney on the site was considered dangerous in the event of bombing during World War II, and so Gainsborough Studios was evacuated to Lime Grove for the duration of hostilities. Heads of the studio were Edward Black and Maurice Ostrer.

From 1943 to 1946, Gainsborough produced a series of studio-bound costume melodramas for the domestic market, which became known collectively as the Gainsborough melodramas. They were mostly based on recent popular books by female novelists. Prominent titles included The Man in Grey (1943), Madonna of the Seven Moons (1944), Fanny by Gaslight (1944), The Wicked Lady (1945) and Caravan (1946). The films featured a stable of leading British actors, among them Margaret Lockwood, James Mason, Stewart Granger and Patricia Roc. The studio also made modern-dress comedies and melodramas such as Love Story (1944), Two Thousand Women (1944), Time Flies (starring Tommy Handley, 1944), Bees in Paradise (with Arthur Askey directed by Val Guest, 1944), They Were Sisters (1945), and Easy Money (1948).

Subsequent productions, overseen by Betty Box (who at the time was the only female producer in British cinema), included the neo-realist Holiday Camp (1947), Miranda (1948) and the Huggett family series, with Jack Warner, Kathleen Harrison, and Petula Clark, who had been introduced in Holiday Camp.

In late 1947 Kinematograph Weekly called Gainsbrough the British film studio of the year.

However many of the films lost money. Unhappy with the performance of the studio, Rank closed it down in early 1949. Production was concentrated at Pinewood Studios. Although films continued to be made there under the Gainsborough banner, that quickly ceased, and no further Gainsborough films were released after 1951. It was revived in 1987 and made the television film, A Hazard of Hearts.

== Demolition ==
The original Lime Grove site was taken over by the BBC in 1949 and remained in use until it was closed in 1991. The buildings were demolished in the early 1990s, and have been since replaced with housing presently called Gaumont Terrace and Gainsborough Court.

The former Islington Studios, in Poole Street, remained largely derelict after their closure in 1949 apart from occasional art performances, including two epic Shakespearean productions by the Almeida Theatre Company, April–July 2000, directed by Jonathan Kent and starring Ralph Fiennes, and a closing Hitchcock season in October 2003.

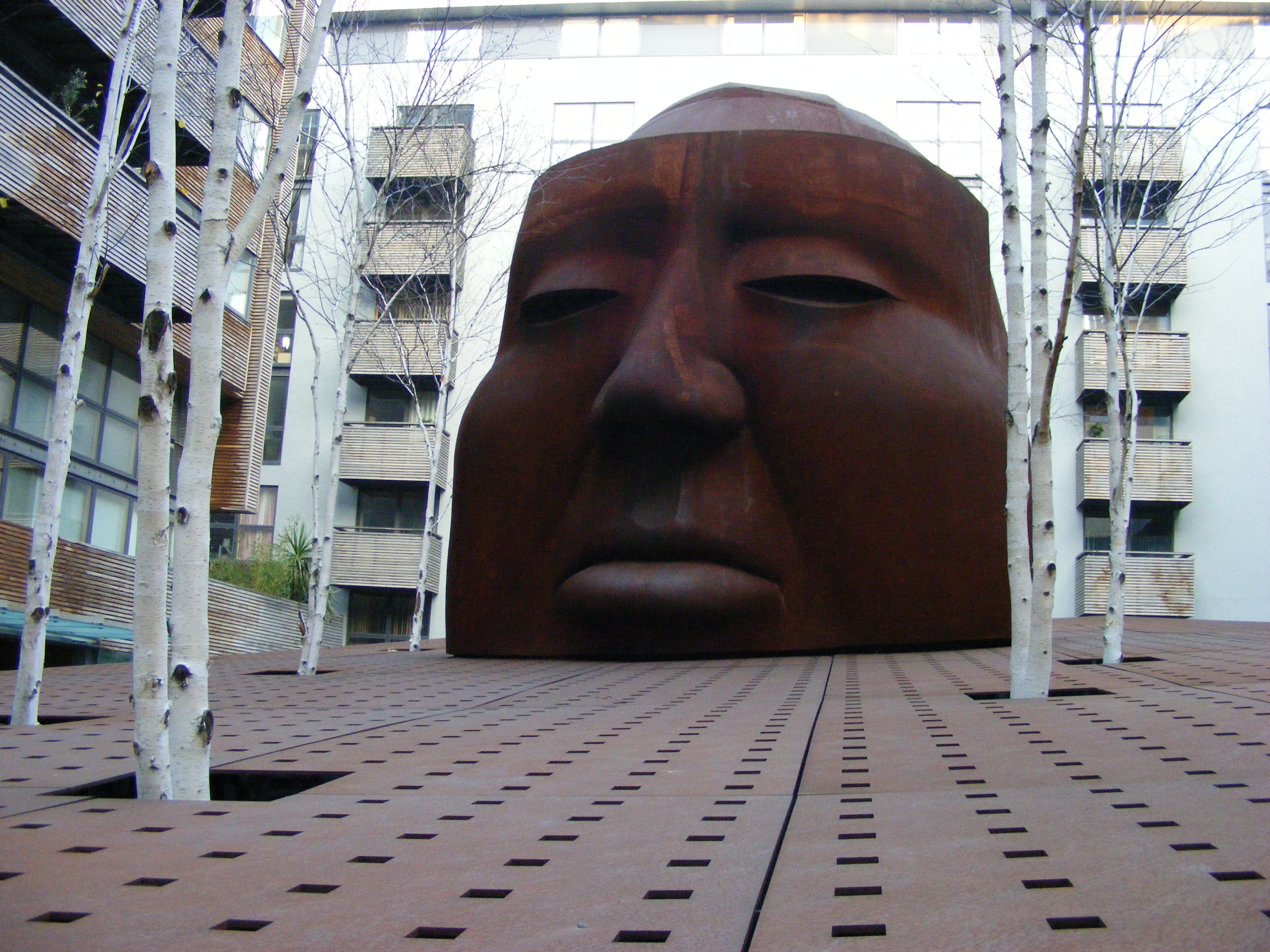
Alfred Hitchcock sculpture at the Gainsborough Studios apartments

The buildings began to be cleared in 2002, and apartments named Gainsborough Studios were built on the site in 2004 by architects Munkenbeck and Marshall.

== Bibliography ==
- Cook, Pam, ed. (1997). Gainsborough Pictures. London: Cassell. ISBN 9780304337071.
- Harper, Sue (1994). Picturing the Past: the Rise and Fall of the British Costume Film. London: British Film Institute. ISBN 0851704492.
- Harper, Sue (2000). Women in British Cinema: mad, bad, and dangerous to know. London: Continuum. ISBN 9780826447333.
