= Léon-Joseph Chavalliaud =

French sculptor

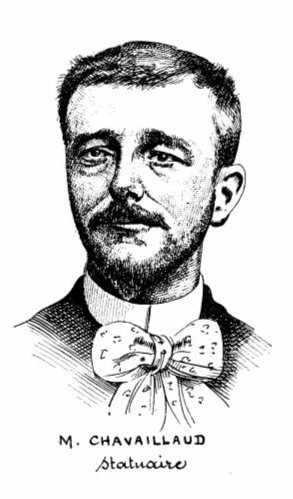
- A drawing of Léon Joseph Chavalliaud by Tristan de Pyègne
- Born: 29 January 1858; Reims, Second French Empire
- Died: 5 February 1919 (aged 61); Boissy-sans-Avoir, Third French Republic
- Known for: Sculpture

Léon-Joseph Chavalliaud (French pronunciation: [leɔnʒozɛf ʃavaljo]; 29 January 1858 – 5 February 1919) was a French sculptor. He created several notable works in France and in England, where he lived for 15 years.

== Early life ==
Chavalliaud (sometimes spelt Chavaillaud) was born in Reims at No. 47 Chativesle St. and died at Boissy-sans-Avoir, Yvelines. He is buried in the North Cemetery in Rheims. He married Juliana Marie Rousseau.

He was an apprentice modeller in the workshop of a Mr Bulteau in Rheims, in Buirette St., very close to his place of birth. Later he entered the École nationale supérieure des Beaux-Arts with a grant from the city council. There, he was a pupil of Alexandre Falguière, François Jouffroy and Louis-August Roubaud.

== Works ==
In 1880, after working on the caryatids on the façade of the town hall patio in Rheims, he won the Prix de Roma with a sculpture called Mère Spartiate (Spartan Mother). The caryatids were partly destroyed in a fire in 1917. The remains of the statues now decorate the front of the Georget Hotel in Rheims.

In 1890, together with sculptor Deperthes and his son, Chavalliaud created a monument commemorating the Brittany-Anjou Federation of 1790, which was installed near Morbihan, Pontivy, in Brittany. This sculpture was destroyed with dynamite by Breton separatists in 1938.

In the 1890s, he received a commission in England and remained in Britain for fifteen years, living in Brixton, London. During this time, he occasionally worked for (or with) Farmer & Brindley, an architectural sculpture company. He also exhibited at the National Gallery Summer Exhibition. and the Walker Gallery in Liverpool.

Amongst the works he completed were eight statues of famous naturalists and explorers. Commissioned in 1896, they stand outside at the eight angles of the Palm House in Sefton Park, Liverpool. The marble statues are of the naturalists Carl Linnaeus, Charles Darwin, John Parkinson (a botanist), and André le Nôtre (a landscape gardener). The bronze statues are of the explorers and navigators Henry the Navigator, Gerardus Mercator, Christopher Columbus, and Captain James Cook.

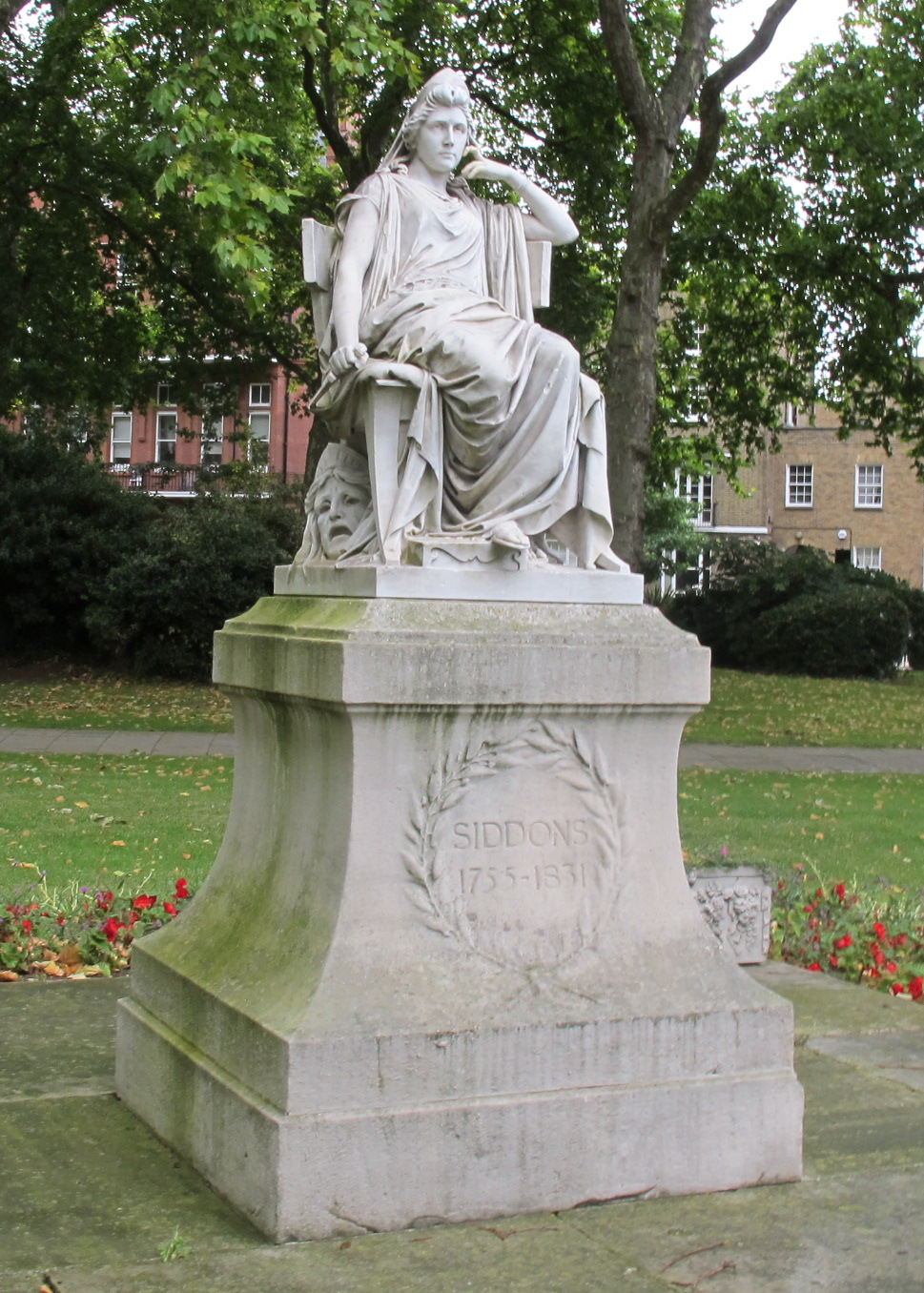
A Statue of Sarah Siddons on Paddington Green

He made a memorial in white marble Statue of Sarah Siddons to actress Sarah Siddons, inspired by the painting Sarah Siddons as the Tragic Muse by Joshua Reynolds, which stands on Paddington Green, London near the churchyard of St Mary's Church where she is buried. A statue of Cardinal Newman by Chavalliaud is installed at Brompton Oratory in London.

In the salon of the French Artists' Society in 1897, he presented a statuette of Dom Perignon with an inscription which reads "Dom Perignon, the inventor of sparkling Champagne wines". It was sold in Rheims in 1989 for £1,097.

In his birth city, he continued to produce bust portraits and developed a solid reputation. Among others, he created a bust of Dr. Jean-Baptiste Langlet, the mayor of Rheims at the time, which is kept in the town hall. For that sculpture in plaster in 1915, Chavalliaud received 800 francs.

== Works exhibited at The Royal Academy of Arts Summer Exhibition ==
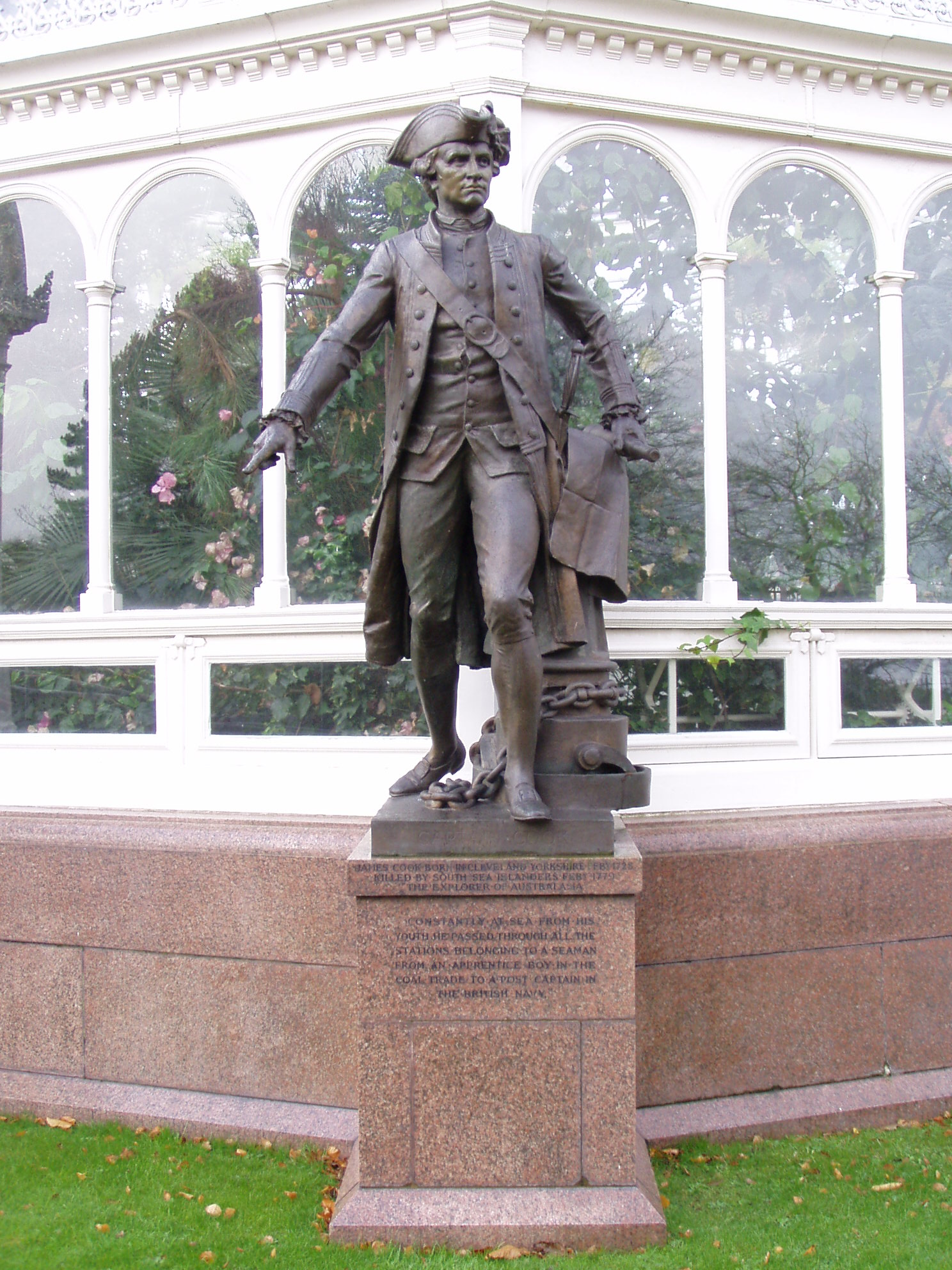
The statue of Captain James Cook at the Palm House, Sefton Park, Liverpool

- 1893. Mon Pere; bust, bronze, also exhibited at The Second Exhibition of The International Society of Sculptors, Painters and Gravers (London), 1899
- 1894. The Shrimper; statue in marble (a boy holding a shrimp net).
- 1894. Madame Veuve Pommery; portrait bust in marble.
- 1895. A. Hubinet, Esq.; bust, bronze.
- 1896. A. Paroissien, Esq.; bust.
- 1904. Portrait; bust, bronze. (may be duplicated in the list below)

== Other works ==
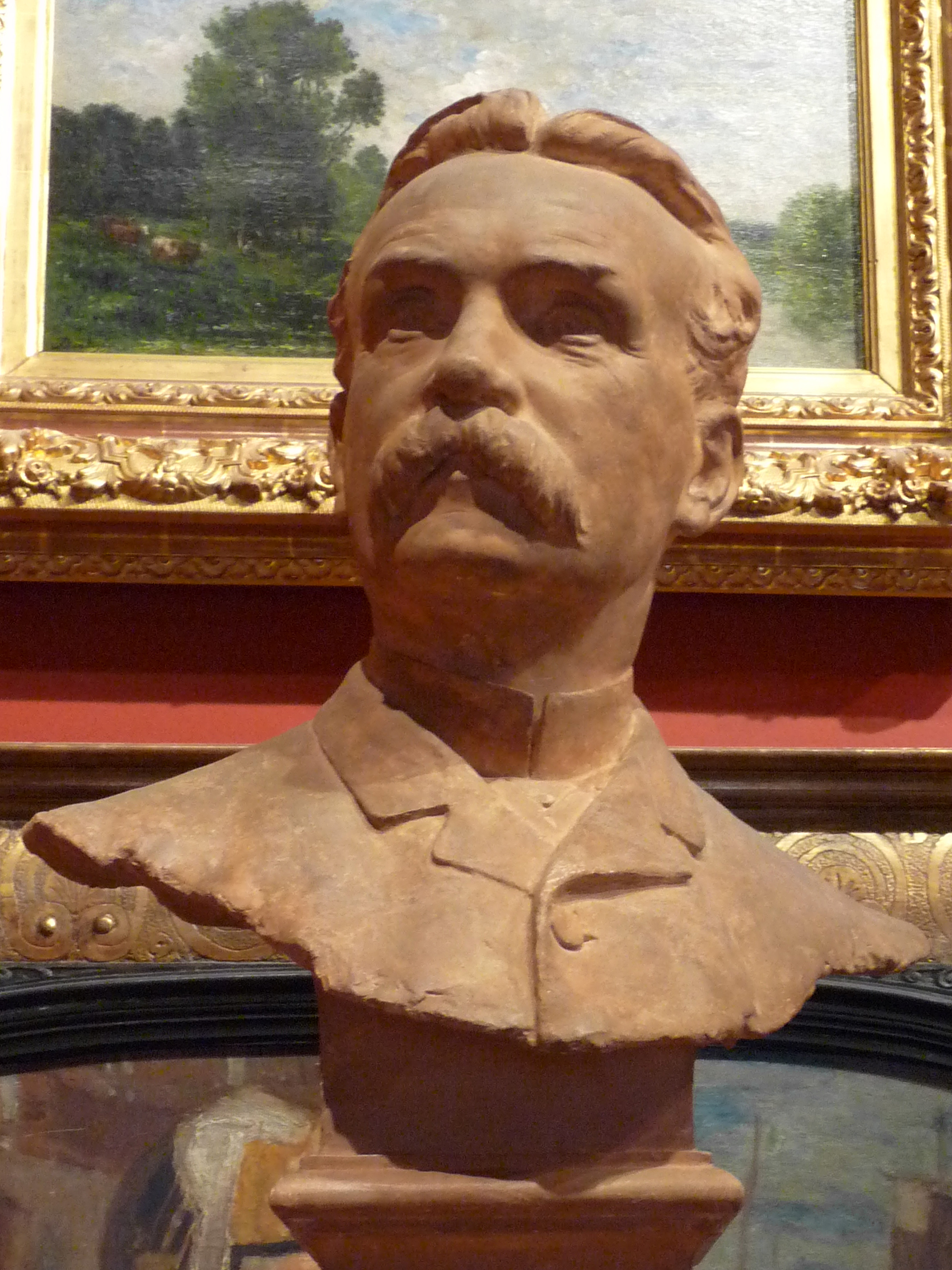
A portrait bust of M. Henry Vasnier

- Tobias Taking the Fish from the Water, kept in the Rheims Museum of Fine Arts. 1890
- St. Ambrosia, bronze bust, kept in the Rheims Museum of Fine Arts.
- A bronze bust of George Bernard Shaw
- A bronze relief of James Robert Creighton, twice Mayor of Carlisle, and surmounting statue of St George on the Grade II listed Creighton Memorial.
- A bronze bust of Rev. James Healy. 1895
- The effigy on the tomb of the Hugh Grosvenor, 1st Duke of Westminster in St Mary's Church, Eccleston, Cheshire
- A bust of William Talbot in Norwich. Bishop of Oxford 1904, founder of the Amicable Society for a Perpetual Assurance Office in Norwich
- A bust of French merchant Henry Vasnier, kept in the Rheims Museum of Fine Arts
- A memorial bronze bust to Bartèlèmy Paupy, a French industrialist. 1892, In the Cimetière de l'Est, Paris. Signed "from a photograph".
- A memorial plaque for Abbé Declaire in the Cimetière du nord, Reims
