= Jawahir Roble =

Somali-born British football referee

Jawahir Roble MBE
- Born: 1995 (age 30–31); Somalia

Jawahir Roble MBE (born 1995), also known as Jawahir Jewels or JJ, is a Somali-born British football referee. The Daily Telegraph has called her "the most remarkable referee in England". She herself has said, "Who would ever think a black, Somali-born immigrant girl with eight siblings could ref a men’s game in England with a hijab on?".

== Early life ==
Jawahir Roble was born in Somalia, and grew up in north-west London with her parents and eight siblings. She has said, "We always played football in the garden, in the house, outside, everywhere". Roble is a Muslim, and wears a hijab when working as a referee.

== Career ==
In 2014, aged 19, she became more serious about how to encourage Muslim girls to play football. In 2013, she obtained a £300 grant, and managed to involve Ciara Allan, her local Middlesex county FA women and girls football development officer. In September 2013, Allen launched the Middlesex FA Women's League with a new Desi division for girls. In return for refereeing games every week, Middlesex FA funded Roble's formal referee training.

In 2017, she was one of eleven award winners at the Respect Awards, and collected the Match Official prize. Roble's award was in recognition of her volunteering work for the education charity Football Beyond Borders (FBB) and with the Middlesex FA, coaching FBB's first women's team, as well as for achieving a Level Six refereeing qualification. She is an FA Youth Leader.

She has said, "Of course they're surprised to see a Muslim girl refereeing! I'm kind of short as well so they're like 'okay, what is this child doing here' ".

== Vision ==
In 2014, Roble then aged 19 wrote,

I have a dream that one day my fellow Muslim sisters will happily play sport. My aim is to engage young Muslim girls into sports from the ages of 8 years to 15. My overall aim is to promote football as a tool to engage young girls and then to run workshops that help develop team building skills, boost confidence and also promote a healthy lifestyle.

== Honours and recognition ==
She was recognized as one of the BBC's 100 women of 2019.

Roble was appointed Member of the Order of the British Empire (MBE) in the 2023 New Year Honours for services to association football.
