= Sarah Siddons =

Welsh-born actress (1755–1831)

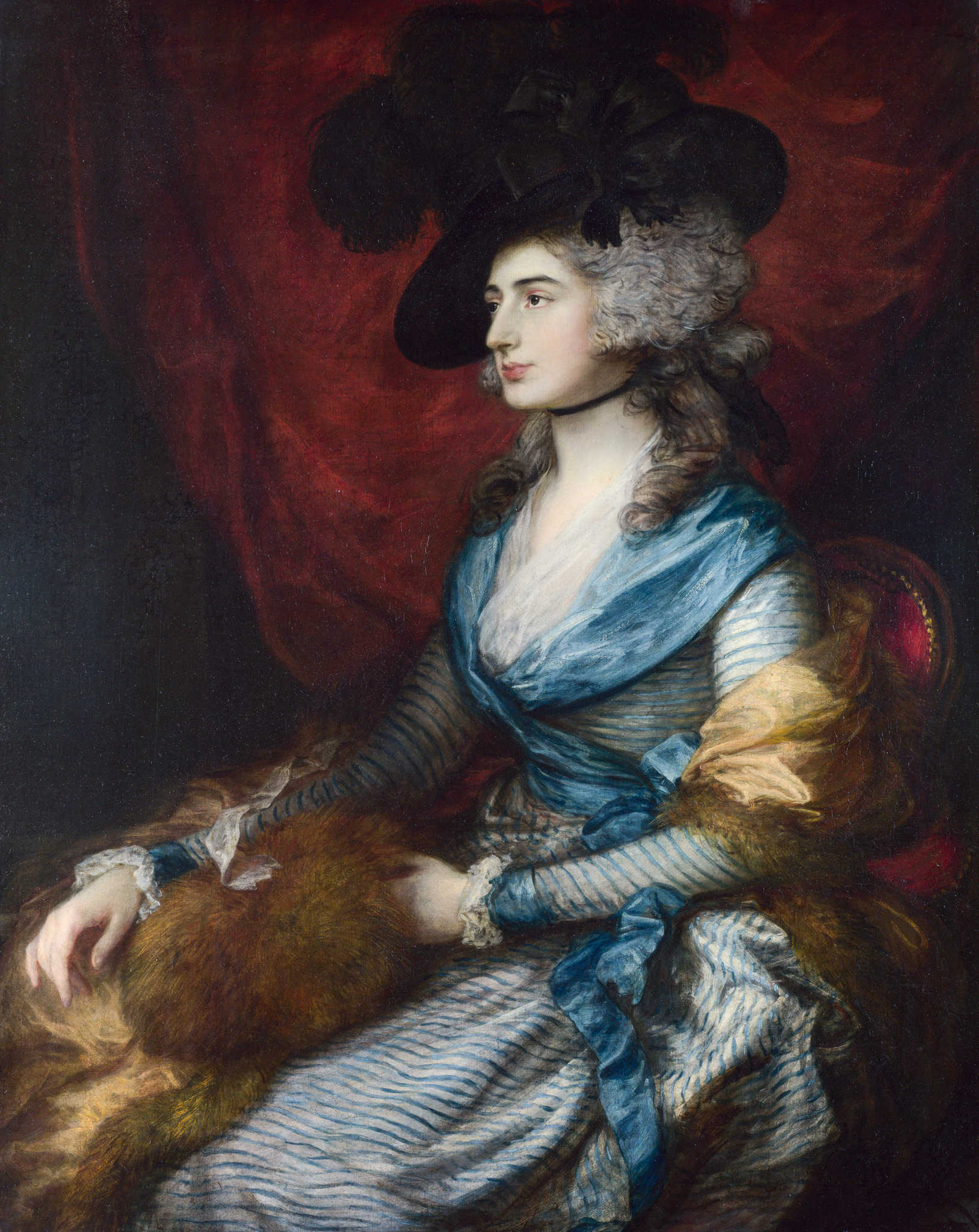
- Portrait of Sarah Siddons by Thomas Gainsborough, 1785
- Born: Sarah Kemble; 5 July 1755; Brecon, Wales
- Died: 8 June 1831 (aged 75); London, England
- Resting place: Saint Mary's Cemetery, Paddington Green, London, England
- Occupation: Actress
- Spouse: William Siddons
- Children: 7, including Henry Siddons
- Parent(s): Roger Kemble; Sarah Ward
- Relatives: Kemble family

Sarah Siddons (née Kemble; 5 July 1755 – 8 June 1831) was a Welsh actress, the best-known tragedienne of the 18th century. Contemporaneous critic William Hazlitt dubbed Siddons as "tragedy personified".

She was the elder sister of John Philip Kemble, Charles Kemble, Stephen Kemble, Ann Hatton, and Elizabeth Whitlock, and the aunt of Fanny Kemble. She was most famous for her portrayal of the Shakespearean character Lady Macbeth, a character she made her own.

The Sarah Siddons Society, founded in 1952, continues to present the Sarah Siddons Award annually in Chicago to a distinguished actress.

== Background ==
The 18th-century marked the "emergence of a recognisably modern celebrity culture" and Siddons was at the heart of it. Portraits depicted actresses in aristocratic dress, the recently industrialised newspapers spread actresses' names and images and gossip about their private lives through the public. Though few people had actually seen Siddons perform, her name had been circulated to such an extent that when it was announced "the crowd behaved as if they knew her already".

Actresses playing and acting like aristocrats decreased the difference in the public's eyes between actresses and aristocrats and many earned large amounts of money. Despite this giving actresses a larger amount of control, women were still viewed as "extreme representations of femininity - they were good or bad, comic or tragic, prostitutes or virgins, mistresses or mothers". Their on-stage roles and personal biographies blurred - leading many actresses to use these extreme representations of femininity to create a persona that could be viewed both on and off stage.

== Biography ==
=== Early life ===
Siddons was born Sarah Kemble in Brecon, Brecknockshire, Wales, the eldest daughter of Roger Kemble, a Roman Catholic, and Sarah "Sally" Ward, a Protestant. Sarah and her sisters were raised in their mother's faith and her brothers were raised in their father's faith. Roger Kemble was the manager of a touring theatre company, the Warwickshire Company of Comedians.

Although the theatre company included most members of the Kemble family, Siddons's parents initially disapproved of her choice of profession. At that time, acting was only beginning to become a respectable profession for a woman.

From 1770 until her marriage in 1773, Siddons served as a lady's maid and later as companion to Lady Mary Bertie Greatheed at Guy's Cliffe near Warwick. Lady Greatheed was the daughter of the Duke of Ancaster; her son, Bertie Greatheed, was a dramatist who continued the family's friendship with Siddons.

=== Early career: Before success in London ===
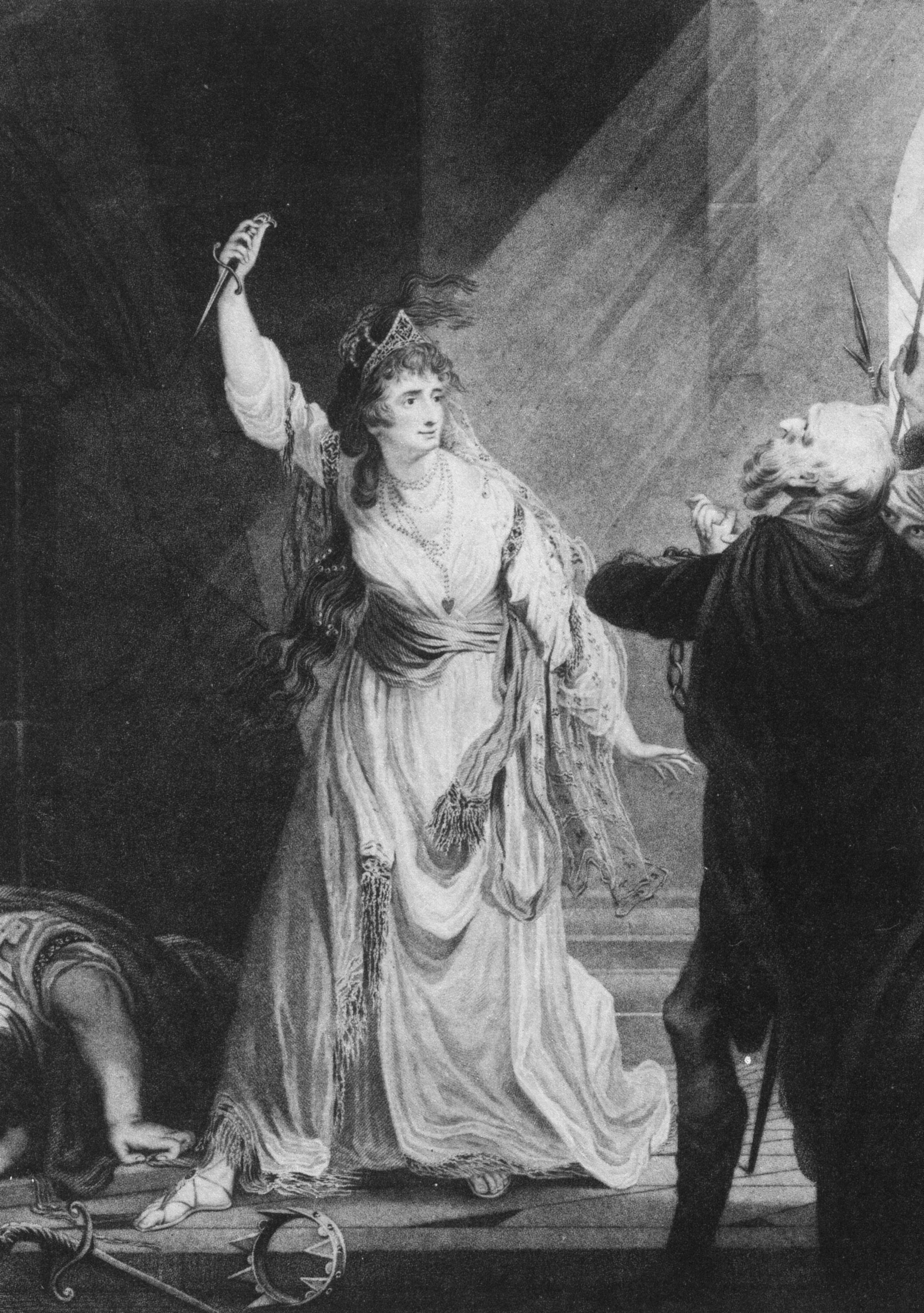
Sarah Siddons as Euphrasia in Arthur Murphy's The Grecian Daughter, at the Theatre Royal, Drury Lane, in 1782

In 1774, Siddons won her first success as Belvidera in Thomas Otway's Venice Preserv'd. This brought her to the attention of David Garrick, who sent his deputy to see her as Calista in Nicholas Rowe's Fair Penitent, the result being that she was engaged to appear at the Theatre Royal, Drury Lane. Owing to inexperience as well as other circumstances, her first appearances as Portia and in other parts were not well received and she received a note from the manager of Drury Lane stating that her services would not be required. She was, in her own words, "banished from Drury Lane as a worthless candidate for fame and fortune".

After she was released from Drury Lane, Siddons was immediately engaged by Richard Yates, manager of the Theatre Royal Birmingham. During the summer of 1776, John Henderson would see Siddons perform. He was immediately struck with her excellence, and pronounced that she would never be surpassed. He did more than this; he wrote directly to Palmer, manager of the Theatre Royal Bath, to advise an engagement of her without delay. Due to there being no available roles for Siddons at the time of Henderson's letter, Palmer could not immediately attend to his advice.

In 1777, she went on "the circuit" in the provinces. For the next six years she worked in provincial companies, in particular York and Bath. Her first appearance at Bath's Old Orchard Street Theatre was in autumn 1778 at a salary of £3 per week (equivalent to £413 in 2025, or approximately $566). This amount grew as her performances became better known, and as she began to appear in Bristol at the Theatre Royal, King Street (which now houses the Bristol Old Vic), also run by John Palmer. Siddons lived with her husband and children in a Georgian house at 33 The Paragon in Bath, until her final performance there in May 1782.

To say farewell to Bristol and Bath, Siddons presented her famous 'three reasons' speech. In a speech of her own writing, Siddons literally presented her three children as her three reasons for leaving. She said 'These are the moles that bear me from your side; / Where I was rooted - where I could have died. / Stand forth, ye elves, and plead your mother's cause' The full speech was published in the Bath Chronicle and Weekly Gazette, 4 July 1782.

The presentation of her own motherhood was something she used throughout her career, notably when she performed her next Drury Lane appearance, on 10 October 1782, which could not have been more different from her debut performances. She was an immediate sensation playing the title role in Garrick's adaptation of a play by Thomas Southerne, Isabella, or, The Fatal Marriage. So good was she that "Her pathetic embodiment of domestic woe created a sensation, flooding the audience with tears and exciting critics to hyperbolic praise."

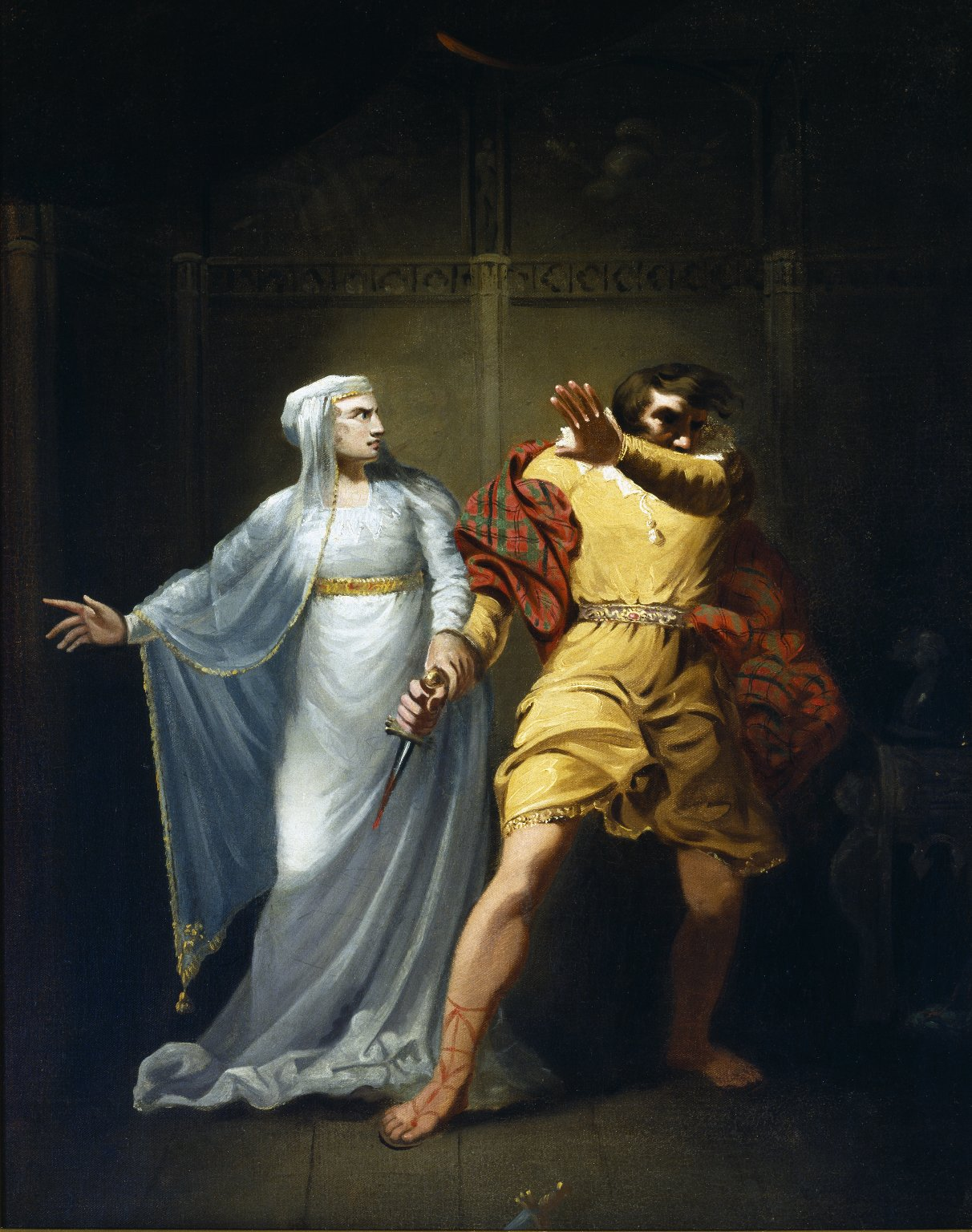
Sarah Siddons as Lady Macbeth, by Robert Smirke, c. 1790–1810

=== Mid-career: Notable roles ===
Siddons continued to act in the provinces, appearing at The Theatre, Leeds, in 1786 and consistently brought a thorough understanding to each of her roles. It was through her portrayals of Lady Macbeth and Isabella, particularly, that Siddons offered a new way of approaching character. Siddons has been credited for inventing and promoting textual accuracy above the theatrical traditions of her time: "Siddons was unique for making herself familiar with the entire script, sitting offstage in order to hear the full play, and paying careful attention to her scene partners and to textual clues that could aid performance."

Her most famous role was that of Lady Macbeth, which she first performed on 2 February 1785. She spellbound her audience through the grandeur of her emotions as she expressed Lady Macbeth's murderous passions. Rather than portraying Lady Macbeth as a murderous evil queen, Siddons depicted her with a strong sense of maternity and a delicate femininity.

As she noted in her own "Remarks to the character of Lady Macbeth", Siddons found an unearthed fragility in this role. "She read, in the 'I have given suck' soliloquy, a 'tender allusion [to] the maternal mother yearning for her babe'; it is therefore in Lady Macbeth that Siddons found the highest and best scope for her acting abilities. She was tall and had a striking figure, brilliant beauty, powerfully expressive eyes, and solemn dignity of demeanour which enabled her to claim the character as her own."

After Lady Macbeth she played Desdemona, Rosalind, Ophelia, and Volumnia, all with great success; but it was as Queen Catherine in Henry VIII that she discovered a part almost as well adapted to her acting powers as that of Lady Macbeth. She once told Samuel Johnson that Catherine was her favourite role, as it was the most natural.

==== The role of Hamlet ====
Sarah Siddons played the role of Hamlet multiple times over three decades. By the early nineteenth century, "Hamlet had become arguably Shakespeare's most iconic character". Her choice to tackle this role was fascinating as cross gendered roles were "generally more difficult and demanding than a breeches role". The performer would need to sustain the illusion for the whole duration of the play as opposed to a breeches role which is much more brief and gained comedic success from the character's poor delivery at representing the opposite sex.

Far from a one-off curiosity, "Siddons played Hamlet repeatedly, if sporadically, for three decades, always in the provinces and never in London, until she reached the age of fifty". Sarah Siddons first played Hamlet in Worcester in 1775 and then in Manchester opposite her brother John Philip Kemble as Laertes March 1777. At the Bristol theatre, she played Hamlet in 1781. She went on to repeat the role in Liverpool. In Dublin, she played Hamlet during the season of 1802-03 and once more in 1805. She proposed that last performance to her friend and fellow actor William Galindo as a revival of their successful 1802 performance, with herself as Hamlet and Galindo as Laertes. This 1805 revival production made enough of an impression to be caricatured in The Dublin Satirist five years later in 1810.

=== Celebrity status ===
==== Celebrity persona and the "Female Star" ====
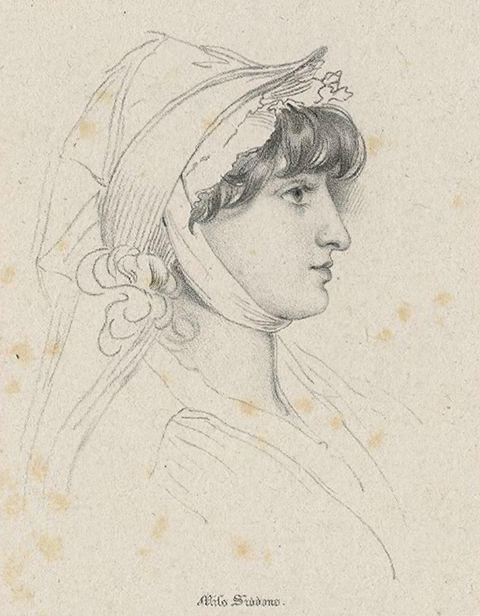
Sarah Siddons by J. Dickinson

It was the beginning of twenty years in which she became the undisputed Queen of Drury Lane. Her celebrity status was called "mythical" and "monumental", and by the mid-1780s Siddons had established herself as a cultural icon. Yet her iconography and the fashioning of her celebrity differed greatly in comparison to her female counterparts. Siddons, according to Laura Engel, invented a new category of femininity for actresses: the "Female Star". By "cleverly blurring the distinction between the characters she played on stage with representations of herself offstage (as much portraiture of the period invokes)" Siddons was able to present a duality to her admirers. At once she would project both the "divine and the ordinary, domestic and authoritative, fantastic and real".

She avoided claims of sexual licentiousness, and the only damage to her career was faced toward its end, when caricatures and satirical prints emerged detailing the physical decline and stoutness of her body. Shearer West, in an analysis of the collapse of Siddons's private and public personas, wrote that Siddons's brother, the actor-manager John Philip Kemble, "substantially rewrote passages in some of the plays in order to temper any indelicacy [and] transcend sexual indiscretions" that could harm her reputation of feminine propriety.

Siddons had a unique ability to control her own celebrity persona and "manipulate her public image through a variety of visual materials". Some scholars believe that although Siddons's fame and success appeared effortless, it was in fact "a highly constructed process". This left her successful, yet fatigued as she was "always aware of the ultimate power of her audiences to approve of her or destroy her". In being aware of her position in the public eye, Siddons "carefully selected the roles in which she appeared and assiduously cultivated her domestic image".

She would only choose roles which could aid her popularity and protect her image. By cleverly blurring the distinction between the characters she played on stage and her presentation offstage, Siddons combined her maternal persona with depictions of British femininity. This allowed her to avoid the same reproach and scandal as other actresses of the time. For example, Siddons used her role of Isabella, a sacrificing mother, to frame her "rise to stardom in terms of her maternal roles on stage and off stage".

In performing these domestic moments with the result of public triumph, Siddons was able to reiterate the characteristics that made her such a popular celebrity and icon; "her devotion to her family and her humble, behind-the-scenes existence". Siddons's role off stage, then, appears to be that of the ordinary wife and mother and this was crucial in a time when women were expected to stay at home, rather than provide for their family. Overall, her choice of roles and carefully constructed persona meant Siddons was able to live out the entirety of her career with little to no public scandal.

==== Acting power ====
Theatre biographer Henry Barton Baker wrote:

Wonderful stories are told of her powers over the spectators. Macready relates that when she played Aphasia in Tamburlaine, after seeing her lover strangled before her eyes, so terrible was her agony as she fell lifeless upon the stage, that the audience believed she was really dead, and only the assurance of the manager could pacify them. One night Charles Young was playing Beverly to her Mrs. Beverly in The Gamester, and in the great scene was so overwhelmed by her pathos that he could not speak. Unto the last she received the homage of the great; even the Duke of Wellington attended her receptions, and carriages were drawn up before her door nearly all day long.

On the night of 2 May 1797, Sarah Siddons's character of Agnes in George Lillo's Fatal Curiosity suggested murder with "an expression in her face that made the flesh of the spectator creep." In the audience was Henry Crabb Robinson, whose respiration grew difficult. Robinson went into a fit of hysterics and was nearly ejected from the theatre. This 'Siddons Fever' was a common occurrence with Richards even suggesting it was part of the amusement: "The theatrical vogue for the audience to shriek whatever the heroine did originated with Sarah. The 'Siddons fever', which 'raised the price of salts and hartshorn', often included fits of fainting, hysterics and physical paroxysms as part of the enjoyment."

Siddons occasionally gave public readings of plays, and the Scottish poet/playwright Joanna Baillie recorded her thoughts of several performances given in 1813. Despite her reservations about Siddons's "frequent bursts of voice beyond what natural passion warranted," Baillie wrote to Sir Walter Scott, "take it all in all was fine & powerful acting; and when it has ceased we of this generation can never look to see the like again."

==== Portrait as The Tragic Muse ====
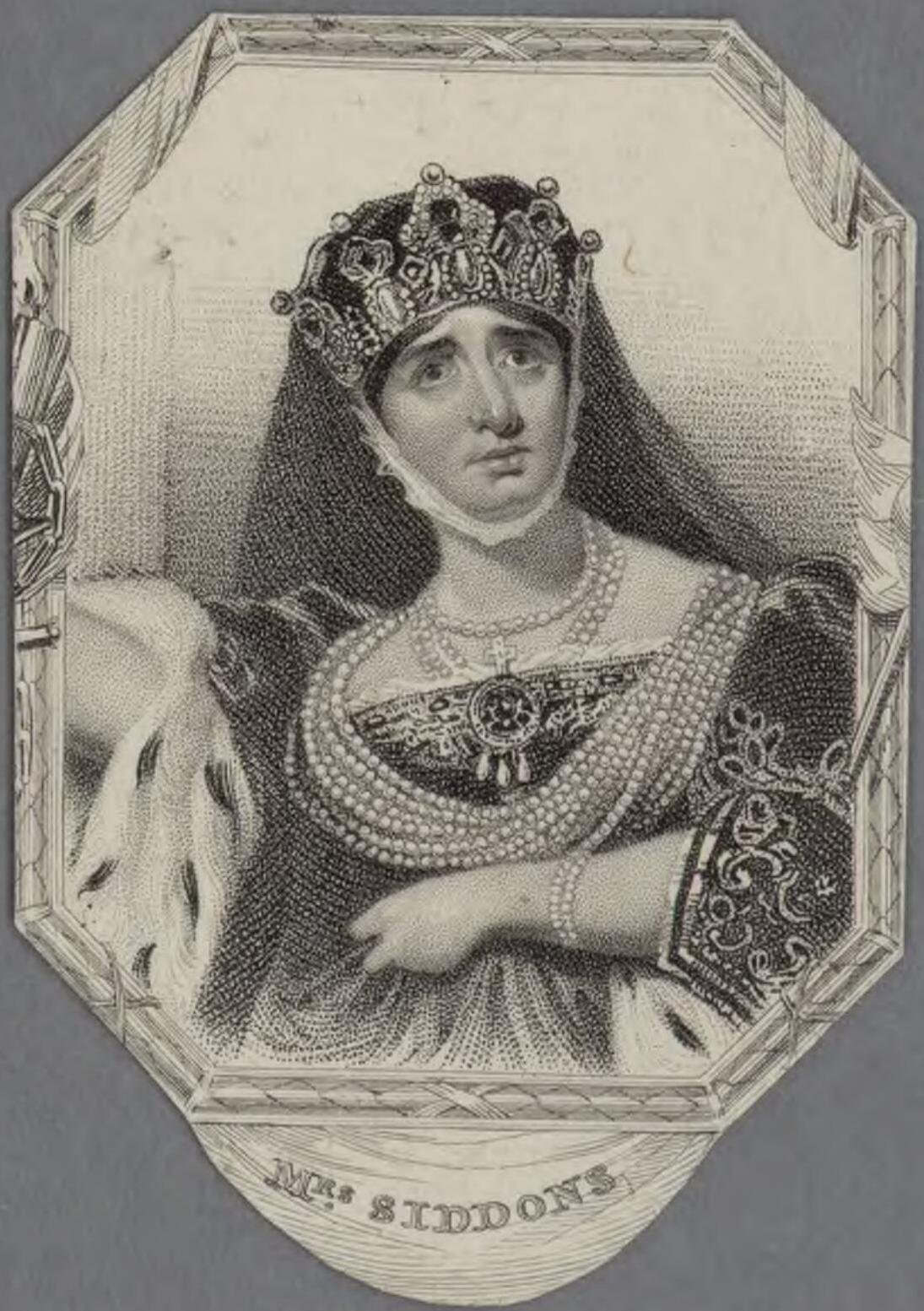
Engraving, artist unknown, from National Library of Wales

Commissioned and completed in 1784, Sir Joshua Reynolds's portrait, Sarah Siddons as The Tragic Muse, is characterized by Reynolds's inspiration, contextualisation of the Muse, and distinctive brush work and paint palette. This portrait, as Heather McPherson writes, became the known depiction of tragedy, infused with contemporary ideas about acting and representation of the passions in Siddons's melancholy expression and deportment. Mary Hamilton's correspondence with her fiancé illuminated its seamless transition from "the artist's studio to the theatrical stage", practical venues that interlocked in the eighteenth century and formed a large part in creating the very idea of celebrity. The interest in the portrait was so great that William Smith's house was transformed into a quasi-public gallery following his acquisition of the painting.

William Hamilton's Mrs Siddons and Her Son, in The Tragedy of Isabella gained much traction due to the mutually beneficial relationship between painter and actress. Hamilton had sold his painting for £150 before it was exhibited at the Royal Academy, though he kept the painting there for over a week and placed advertisements in at least three leading newspapers inviting the public to view it. A contemporary biographer recalled "carriages thronged to the artist's door; and, if every fine lady who stepped out of them did not actually weep before the painting, they had all of them, at least their white handkerchiefs ready for that demonstration of sensibility".

=== Late career and retirement: Physical decline ===
As noted in Campbell's biography, Siddons returned to the role some six years later, and in 1802 she left Drury Lane for its rival establishment, Covent Garden. It was there, on 29 June 1812, after 57 performances that season, that she gave what was credited as perhaps the most extraordinary farewell performance in theatre history. The audience refused to allow Macbeth to continue after the end of the sleepwalking scene. Eventually, after tumultuous applause from the pit, the curtain reopened and Siddons was discovered sitting in her own clothes and character – whereupon she made an emotional farewell speech to the audience. Some records stated that her farewell lasted eight minutes, others suggested ten, all indicating that she was visibly distraught.

Siddons formally retired from the stage in 1812, but reappeared on special occasions. An 1816 request by Princess Charlotte of Wales to see Lady Macbeth brought Siddons out of retirement. Much older, Siddons was visibly weak, overweight, and was considered by some a "grotesque effigy of her former self." William Hazlitt, in his later accounts, stated that her performances lacked the grandeur they had shown in 1785: the "machinery of her voice is slow, there is too long a pause between each sentence [and the] sleeping scene was more laboured and less natural". As a result, according to Lisa Freeman, Siddons's "iconic status came into conflict with the aesthetic of authenticity that she cultivated". Her last appearance was on 9 June 1819 as Lady Randolph in John Home's play Douglas.

=== Marriage and children ===
In 1773, at the age of 18, she married William Siddons, an actor. After 30 years, the marriage became strained and informally ended with their separation in 1804. William died in 1808.

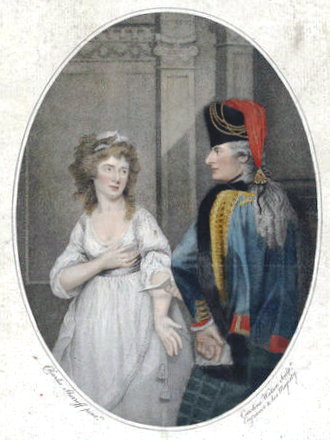
1785 engraving from Charles Shirreff's miniature of Siddons and John Philip Kemble

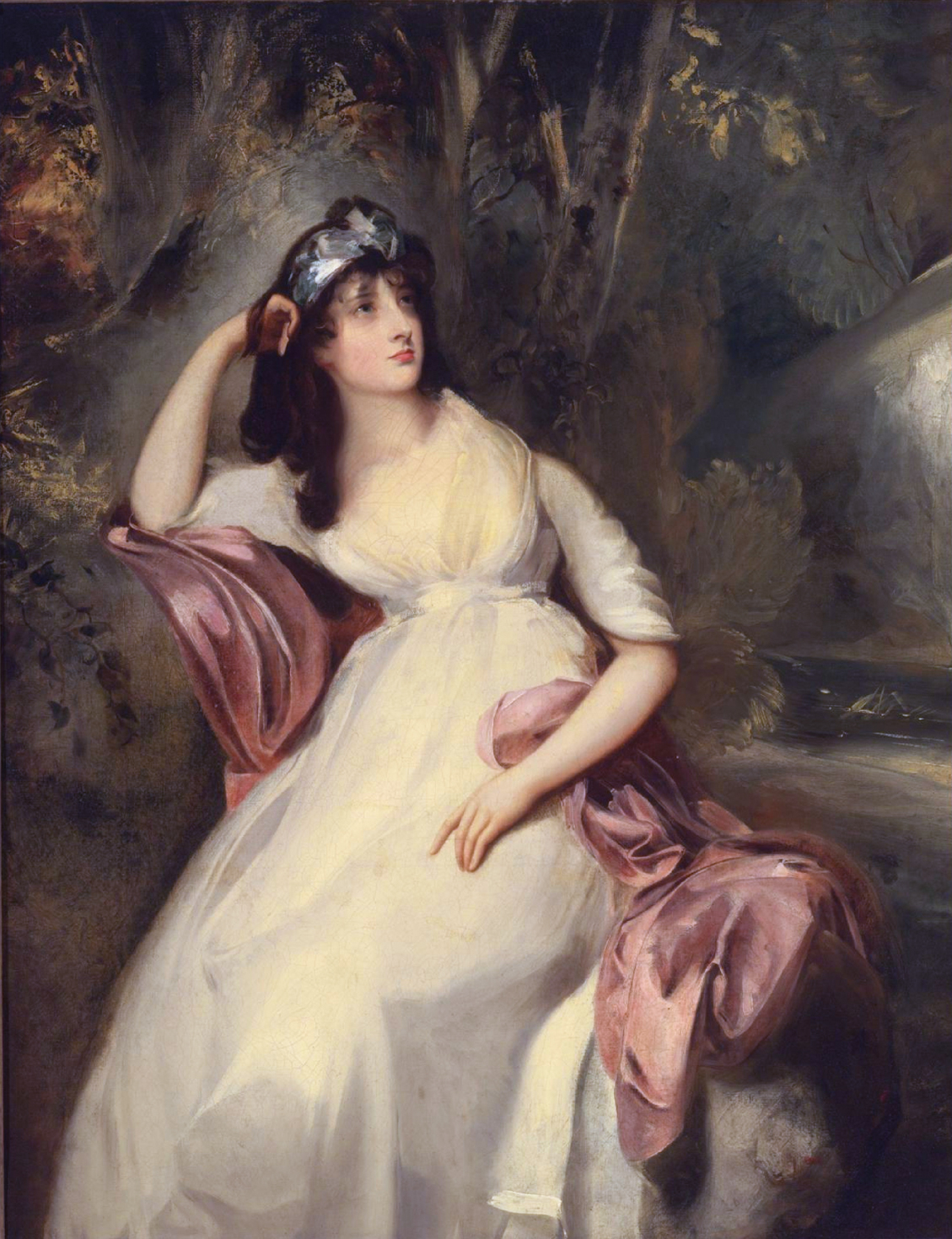
Lawrence was in love with Sarah Siddons's daughter Sally. Painting by Thomas Lawrence, eighteenth century.

Sarah Siddons gave birth to seven children, five of whom she outlived:

- Henry Siddons (1774–1815), an actor and theatre manager in Edinburgh
- Sarah Martha (Sally) Siddons (1775–1803)
- Maria Siddons (1779–1798)
- Frances Emilia Siddons (b. 1781), died in infancy
- Elizabeth Ann Siddons (1782–1788), died in childhood
- George John Siddons (1785–1848), a Customs official in India
- Cecilia Siddons (1794–1868), who married George Combe in 1833 and lived in Edinburgh

Siddons regularly performed on stage while visibly pregnant, which often elicited sympathy for her character. As Lady Macbeth, her pregnancy not only provided "a further reminder of the domestic life of both the actress and the character", adding a maternal aspect to her portrayal, but also created "a new level of tension in the play not present if the couple is perceived as barren."

Her descendants include John Siddons Corby, who invented the Corby gentleman's trouser press, and his children, Peter Corby (inventor of the modern trouser press) and Jane Beadon (socialite and actress).

== Legacy ==
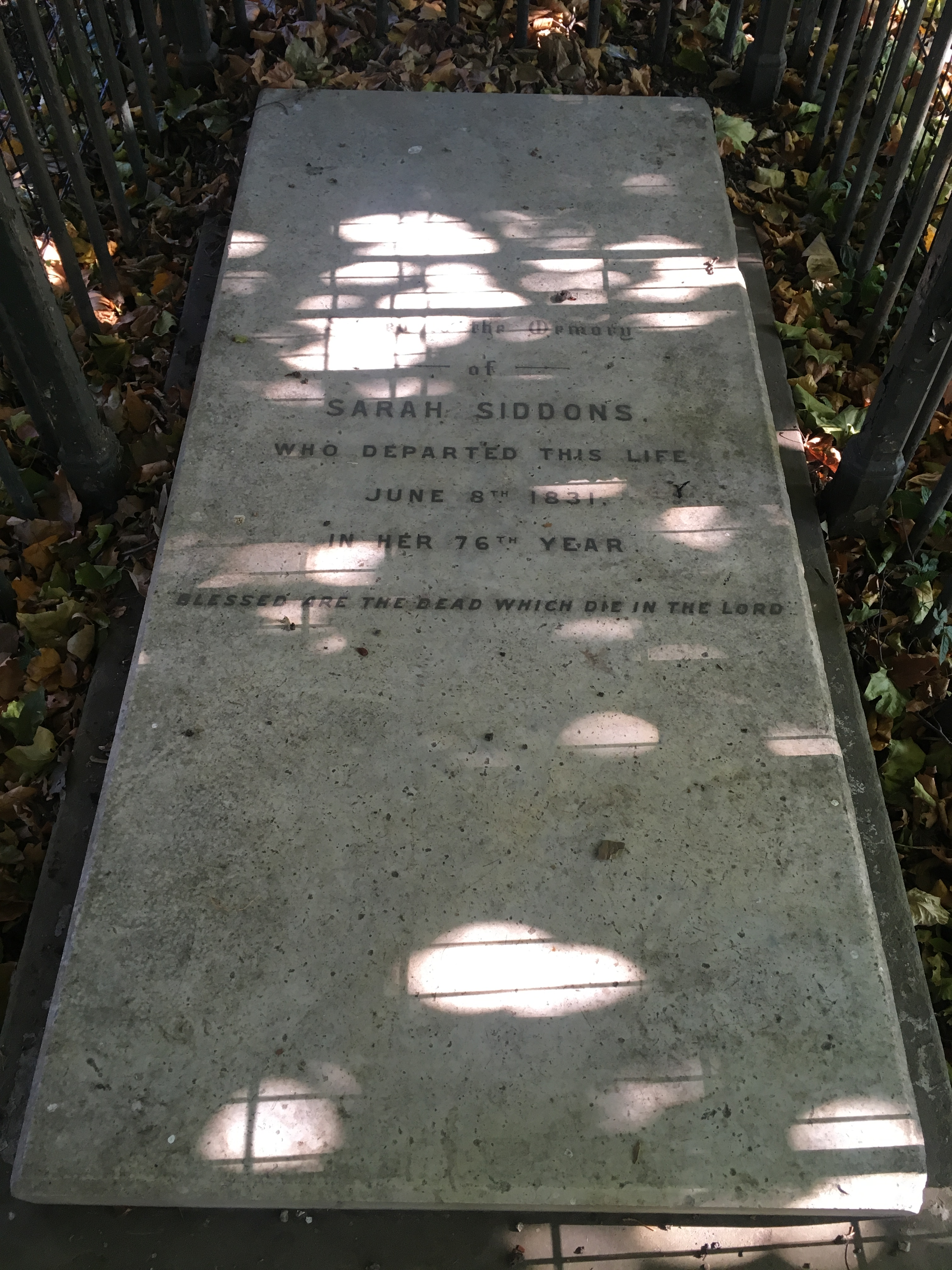
Gravestone of Sarah Siddons

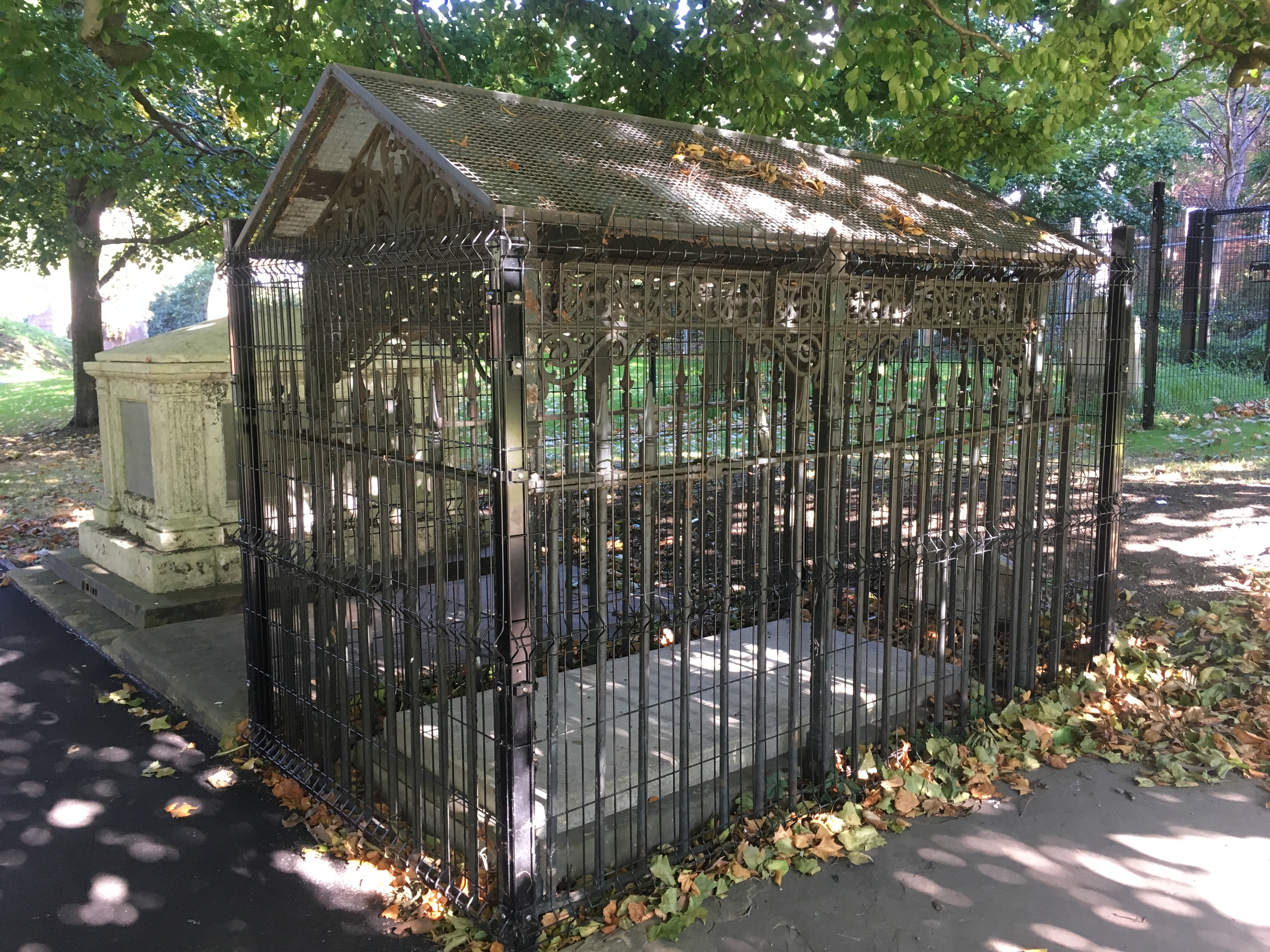
Wrought iron canopy over Siddons's grave

=== Death and burial ===
Sarah Siddons died in 1831 in London. She was interred in Saint Mary's Cemetery at Paddington Green. The churchyard was converted into a public park (St Mary's Gardens) in 1881, and most stones were cleared at that time. Siddons's gravestone was one of the few to be preserved, and it remains in good condition beneath a wrought iron canopy, despite some erosion and the modern addition of a protective cage.

Five thousand people attended her funeral. Newspapers mourned her death, publishing long obituaries. One wrote: "This lady, who, at no very distant period, was not less eminent for the splendour of her mental endowments, than for the towering majesty of her person and demeanour, paid the great debt of nature on Wednesday morning, at nine o'clock." She was described as a goddess, a royal, majestic. The extent of her celebrity reaches forward to today.

=== In popular culture ===
Siddons's portrayal of the prostitute Millwood in a 1796 production of The London Merchant inspired the novel George Barnwell by Thomas Skinner Surr.

American director Joseph L. Mankiewicz used the 1784 portrait by Reynolds extensively in his film All About Eve, winner of the 1950 Academy Award for Best Picture. The portrait is seen at the top of an entrance staircase in Margo Channing's apartment, appearing throughout a party scene, and emphasized by a close-up with which the scene ends. Mankiewicz also invented the (then) fictitious Sarah Siddons Society for the film, along with its award, a statuette modelled upon the Reynolds painting. The film opens with a close-up of the statuette, and ends with a character holding it.

Actress Bette Davis, who played Margo Channing in the film, posed as Siddons in a 1957 re-creation of the Reynolds portrait staged as part of the Pageant of the Masters.

In April 2010, BBC Radio 4's Woman's Hour Drama presented Sarah Siddons: Life in Five Sittings, a radio drama by David Pownall about the long relationship between Siddons and artist Thomas Lawrence, in five 15-minute parts, whilst she is the central character in The Divine Mrs S., a 2024 play by April De Angelis.

=== Sarah Siddons Award ===
When the film All About Eve was released in 1950, the "Sarah Siddons Award for Distinguished Achievement" depicted in its opening scene was a purely fictitious award. However, in 1952, a small group of distinguished Chicago theatergoers formed the Sarah Siddons Society, and began to give a genuine award by that name. The now-prestigious Sarah Siddons Award is presented annually in Chicago, with a trophy modelled on the statuette of Siddons awarded in the film. Past honorees include Bette Davis and Celeste Holm, who were previously in the cast of All About Eve.

=== Portraits and statues ===
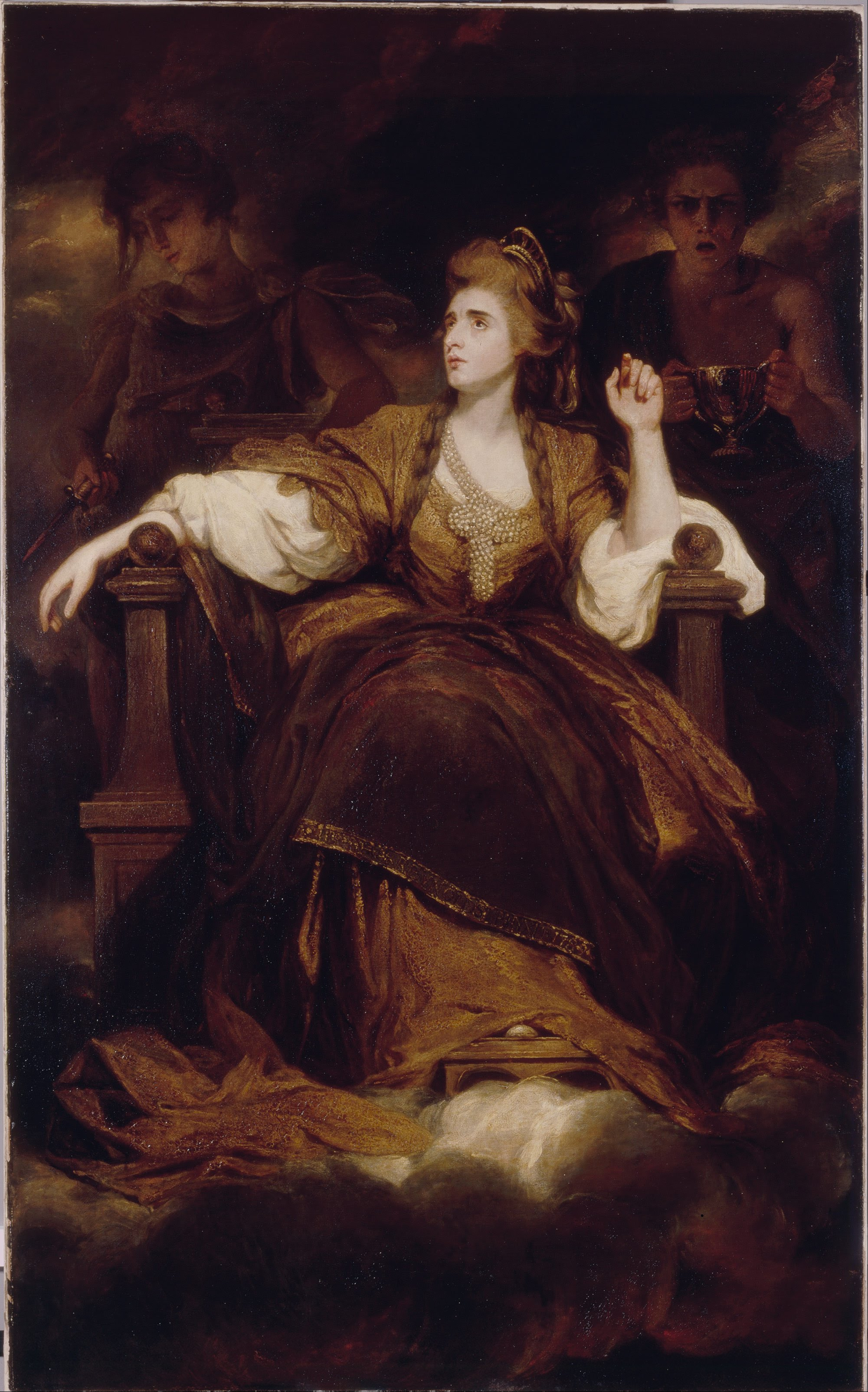
Mrs. Siddons as the Tragic Muse by Joshua Reynolds

Siddons sat for numerous artists, and her portraits include many that depict her in costume portraying a theatrical role.

- Sir Thomas Lawrence first painted Siddons at Bath in 1782, and produced at least fourteen portraits of her over the next 22 years. The last of these, an 1804 full-length portrait, is on display at Tate Britain.
- Sir Joshua Reynolds painted his famous portrait, Mrs. Siddons as the Tragic Muse, in 1784. He told her that he had signed it on the hem of her dress because he had "resolved to go down to posterity on the hem of your garment." It now hangs at The Huntington in San Marino, California.
- A 1785 portrait by Thomas Gainsborough is displayed in London's National Gallery.
- A portrait of Siddons is displayed in the church hall of St Mary on Paddington Green, near Siddons's grave in the former churchyard (now St Mary's Gardens).
- Also on Paddington Green, the Statue of Sarah Siddons overlooks the Harrow Road. Designed by Léon-Joseph Chavalliaud, it was unveiled in 1897 by Henry Irving
- A statue of Siddons by sculptor Thomas Campbell stands in the chapel of St Andrew in Westminster Abbey. The statue holds a scroll, and the inscription reads: "Sarah Siddons. Born at Brecon July 5, 1755. Died in London June 8, 1831."
- A bust by James Smith, created in 1813 was placed in the Green Room at Drury Lane Theatre and contemporary adverts described it as the only bust "taken from life"

=== Other memorials ===
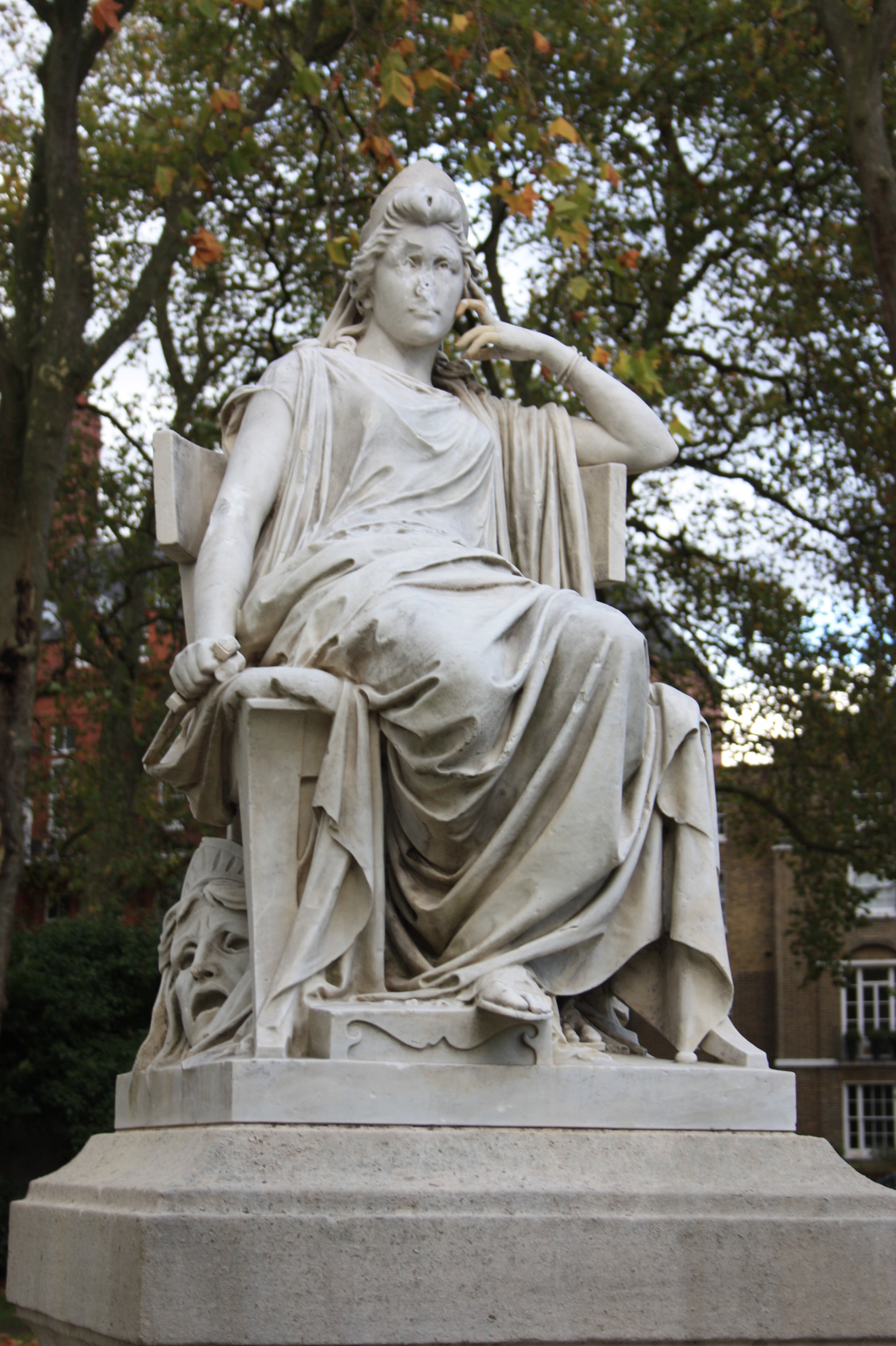
Statue of Sarah Siddons by Leon-Joseph Chavalliaud on Paddington Green

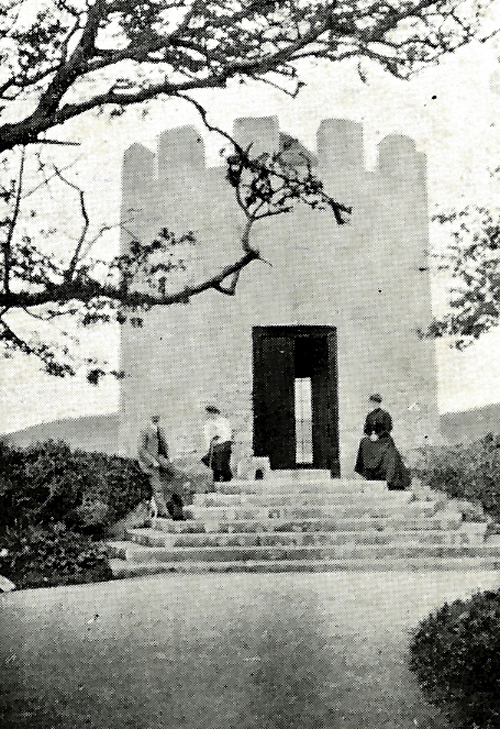
Siddons Tower in County Cork, Ireland

- Siddons Tower, a folly tower erected c. 1777 on the water's edge at Rostellan near Cork Harbour in Ireland, was named in Siddons's honour by Murrough O'Brien, Lord Inchiquin, after he had entertained the actress at Rostellan House.
- Siddons Lane, a small street in Marylebone near the site of a house in which she once lived, was named after her.
- Siddons's birthplace, an inn in Brecon, Wales, is now known as The Sarah Siddons Inn. In 1755, when Siddons was born in lodgings on an upper floor, it was a tavern called The Shoulder of Mutton.
- Sarah Siddons' House (the Old House) in Lower Lydbrook, Gloucestershire is reputedly her childhood home.
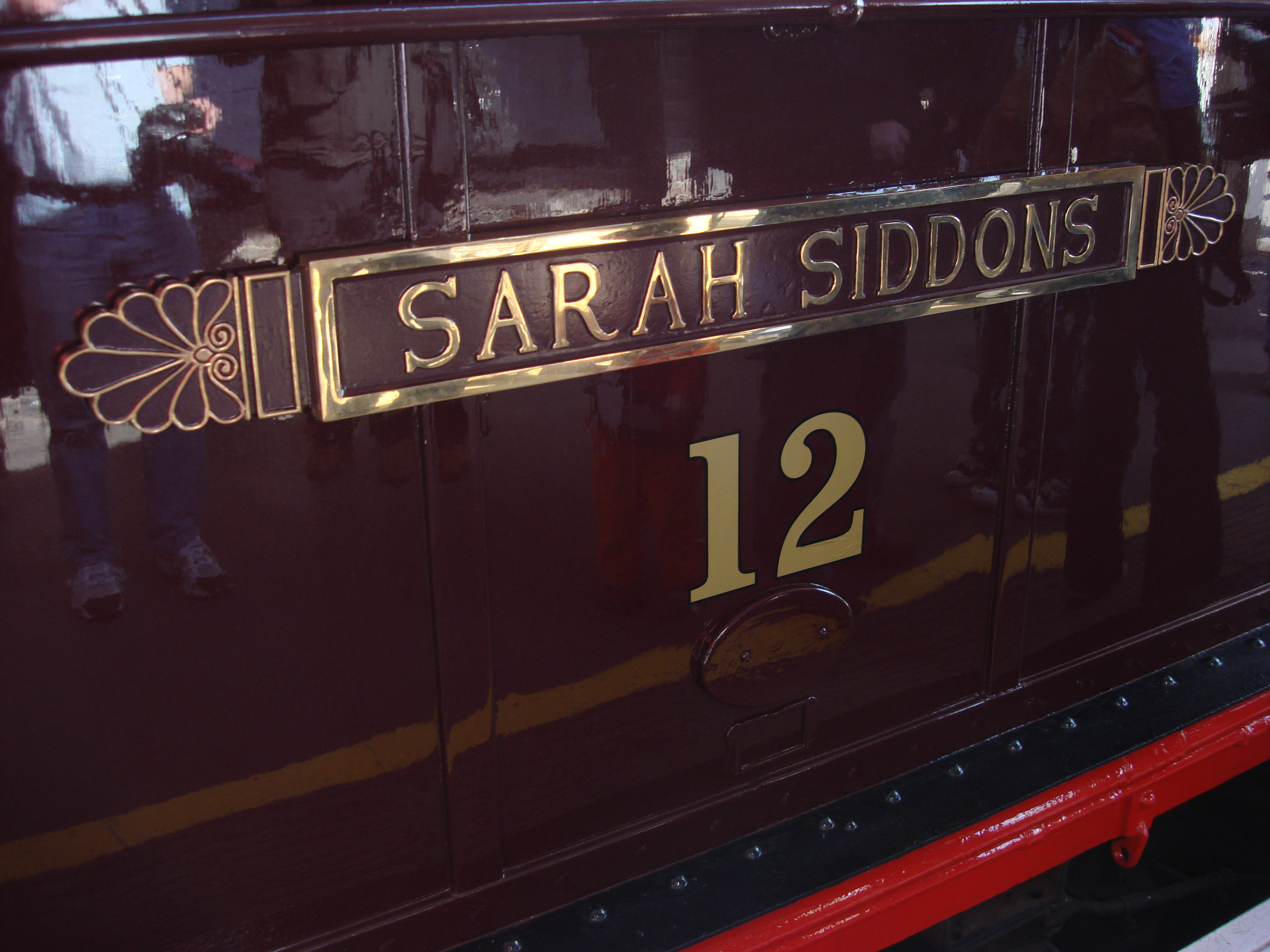
- Metropolitan Railway electric locomotive Sarah Siddons
  In 1923, London's Metropolitan Railway brought into service an electric locomotive named Sarah Siddons, No. 12. The locomotive remained in service along with others like it on the London Underground Metropolitan line until 1961. Painted a maroon colour, she is now the only one of the original twenty locomotives to remain preserved in working order.
- In 1961, the Sarah Siddons Comprehensive School (later the Sarah Siddons Girls' School) opened in North Wharf Road, Paddington. It was officially opened the following year by the actress Dame Peggy Ashcroft. Women's achievement was celebrated in the girls-only secondary school, with houses named after famous English women. In 1980, it became part of the North Westminster Community School, then in 2006 it was closed before the site was sold for residential development. In 2019, a 'Remembering Sarah Siddons Comprehensive School' Facebook group had more than 540 members.
- In 2020, a memorial plaque was unveiled at the site of her first professional appearance, in Worcester.

== See also ==
- Kemble family
