= Paddington Green, London =

Coordinates: 51.52040°N 0.17525°W

Paddington Green
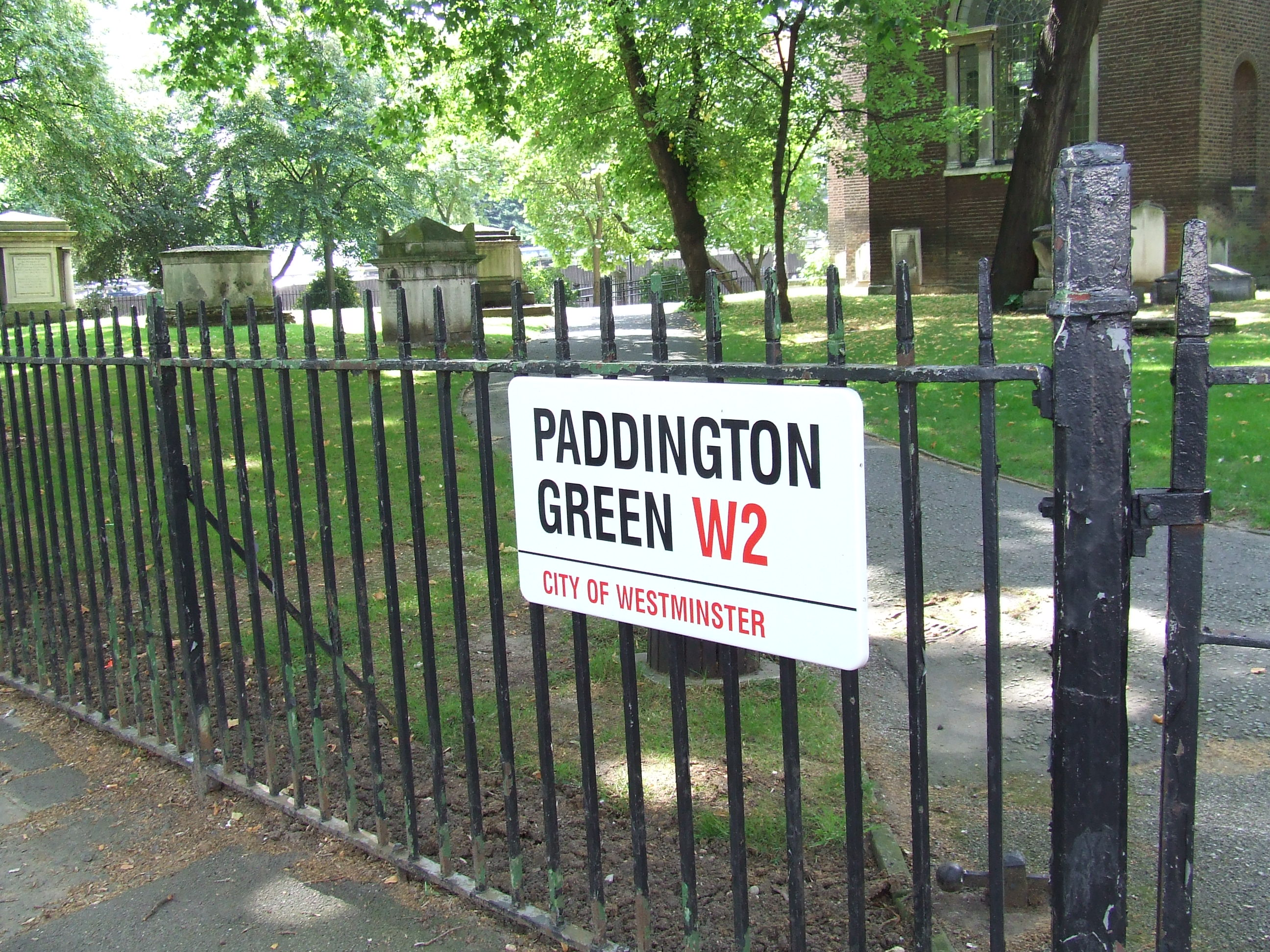

- Location within Greater London
- London borough: Westminster
- Ceremonial county: Greater London
- Region: London
- Country: England
- Sovereign state: United Kingdom
- Post town: LONDON
- Postcode district: W2
- Dialling code: 020
- Police: Metropolitan
- Fire: London
- Ambulance: London
- UK Parliament: Queen's Park and Maida Vale
- London Assembly: West Central

Paddington Green is a green space and conservation area in the City of Westminster located off Edgware Road and adjacent to the Westway. It is the oldest part of Paddington and became a separate conservation area in 1988, having previously formed part of Maida Vale conservation area. At one time, the Green was surrounded by large Georgian houses, but now only two remain on the east side of the Green.

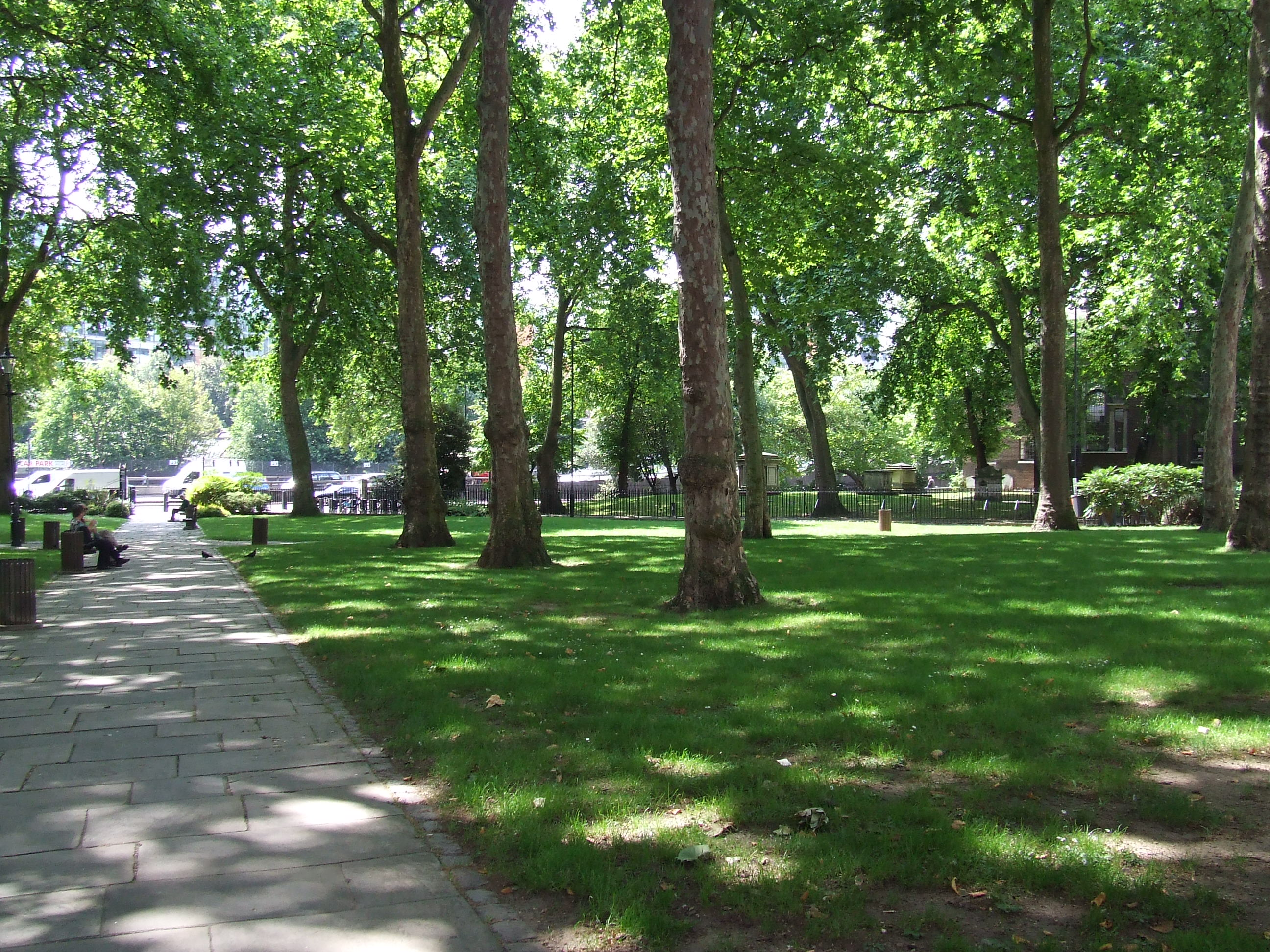
Paddington Green conservation area, showing view to the Westway

== History and notable buildings ==
Paddington Green contains part of the ancient Paddington and Lilestone villages which became fashionable at the end of the 18th century because of its village setting and proximity to the West End of London. An omnibus service to the City of London was introduced in 1829 by George Shillibeer.

St Mary on Paddington Green Church is part of the Parish of Little Venice and is the third church on this site. The church was built in 1791 by John Plaw. Its graveyard – known as St Mary's Gardens (or St Mary's Churchyard) – contains monuments to notable local residents, including actress Sarah Siddons (also buried there), sculptor Joseph Nollekens and lexicographer Peter Mark Roget. The southern part of the graveyard was removed to make way for the flyover. Exhumed remains were re-interred in Mill Hill Cemetery.

The former Paddington Green Children's Hospital (1883–1987), now an apartment block, stands on the north-east corner of the Green on Church Street. It is a Grade II listed building. The Schmidt Hammer Lassen-designed City of Westminster College is located at 25 Paddington Green.

Paddington Green Police Station, on Harrow Road, was open from 1971 to 2018. The building was demolished in 2023–24.
