= Kemble =

Kemble may refer to:

== Places ==
- Kemble, Gloucestershire, a village in England
  - Kemble railway station
  - Cotswold Airport (formerly Kemble Airfield and RAF Kemble)
  - Kemble Air Show, former name of the Cotswold Air Show
- Kemble, Ontario, Canada
- Battery Kemble Park, Washington, DC, United States

== People ==
- Adelaide Kemble (1815–1879), English opera singer
- Arthur Kemble (1862–1925), English cricketer and rugby union player
- C. C. Kemble (born 1831), American architect
- Charles Kemble (1775–1854), British actor
- E. W. Kemble (1861–1933), American illustrator of Mark Twain books
- Edwin C. Kemble (1889–1984), American physicist
- Fanny Kemble (1809–1893), English actress who became a writer and an anti-slavery activist
- Gary Kemble, New Zealand rugby league footballer and coach
- Gouverneur Kemble (1786–1875), American ironmaster
- Henry Kemble (actor, born 1848) (1848–1907), British actor
- Henry Stephen Kemble (1789–1836), British actor
- John Kemble (martyr) (1599–1679), English Roman Catholic martyr
- John C. Kemble (1800–1843), New York politician
- John H. Kemble (1912–1990), American maritime historian
- John Mitchell Kemble (1807–1857), British historian of Anglo-Saxon England
- John Philip Kemble (1757–1823), British actor
- Lillian Kemble, American stage and silent film actress
- Maria Theresa Kemble (1774–1832), English actress and playwright
- Myra Kemble (1857–1906), Australian actress
- Penn Kemble (1941–2005), American political activist
- Priscilla Kemble (1756–1845), English actress
- Roger Kemble (1721–1802), English theatre manager and actor
- Stephen Kemble (1758–1822), English theatre director and actor

== Other uses ==
- Kemble family, a family of English actors and operatic singers
- 78431 Kemble, an asteroid

== See also ==
- Kemball
