= Alice Barnett =

English actress & singer (1846–1901)

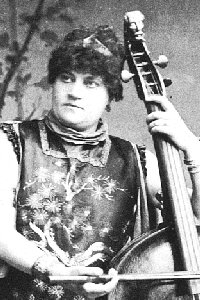
as Lady Jane in Patience

Alice Barnett (17 May 1846 – 14 April 1901) was an English singer and actress, best known for her performances in contralto roles of the Gilbert and Sullivan operas with the D'Oyly Carte Opera Company.

Barnett began her career by 1873 in oratorio and other concert work. Using her imposing physical stature to her advantage, she originated several of the early Gilbert and Sullivan "formidable middle-aged ladies", namely Ruth in The Pirates of Penzance (1879), Lady Jane in Patience (1881) and the Fairy Queen in Iolanthe (1882). She then performed in various comic operas in Britain, America, Australia and New Zealand until 1889, earning strong critical praise. After this, she toured in several of the Gaiety burlesques before creating the role of Dame Hecla Cortlandt in W. S. Gilbert and Osmond Carr's His Excellency in 1894. From 1895, she played in Edwardian musical comedy, pantomime and non-musical plays until 1900.

== Life and career ==
=== Early years ===
Barnett was born in London, the daughter of Charles Barnett, a stationer, and Elizabeth Fanny née Kemble, of the theatrical Kemble family. She was the second of three children. Her elder brother Harry Kemble Barnett (d. 1914) became a stage manager, and her younger sister Fanny Kemble Barnett (Mrs William Ebenezer Poole) became an oratorio soloist. Alice's theatrical antecedents included her maternal grandfather Henry Stephen Kemble, her great-grandfather Stephen Kemble, her great-great aunt Sarah Siddons and her great-great uncles John Philip Kemble and Charles Kemble. She trained as a concert singer under Natalia Macfarren and made her concert debut in 1871, followed by many appearances as a contralto soloist around Britain. She sang in oratorios such as Mendelssohn's Elijah, Rossini's Stabat Mater, and Handel's Messiah, as well as concerts of ballads and other lighter repertoire.

=== D'Oyly Carte years ===
In April 1879, Barnett joined Richard D'Oyly Carte's touring Comedy Opera Company as Little Buttercup in H.M.S. Pinafore. She immediately attracted good notices. The theatrical paper The Era wrote, "The Little Buttercup of Miss Alice Barnett comes in for the lion's share of approbation." During her first tour, she was joined by another rising performer in the company, W. S. Penley, playing Sir Joseph Porter.

Barnett travelled with W. S. Gilbert, Arthur Sullivan and Carte to New York City for the company's production there of Pinafore, beginning 1 December 1879. She then created the role of Ruth in Gilbert and Sullivan's new opera, The Pirates of Penzance, on 31 December 1879. Of her Buttercup, The New York Mercury wrote, "Miss Alice Barnett, an enormous female, was well made up as Buttercup, but is far behind her predecessors here either as an actress or a vocalist." She played Ruth throughout the New York run and American tour and continued to play the role at the Opera Comique when the company returned to London in July 1880.

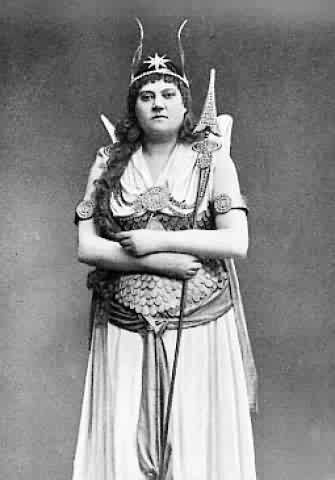
as The Fairy Queen in Iolanthe

Barnett created the next two Gilbert and Sullivan contralto roles, Lady Jane in Patience in 1881 and the Queen of the Fairies in Iolanthe in 1882. Gilbert wrote these formidable characters with Barnett's imposing physical presence in mind, including such self-referential lines for Jane as "not pretty, massive!" and for the Fairy Queen as: "I see no objection to stoutness, in moderation!" The critic Louis Engel described her as "the successful violoncello-player of Patience, who measures 5 feet 10½ inches, and is most proportionately built." The review of Iolanthe in The London Figaro said that Barnett, "a fairy queen of Brobdingnagian proportions, who 'nestles in a nutshell and gambols on gossamer,' invested her part with all the broad humour necessary without overdoing it." The Times called her "the unsurpassable Alice Barnett". In 1883, during the run of Iolanthe, she became ill and was replaced by her understudy, Rosina Brandram, as the principal contralto at the Savoy. When Barnett regained her health, however, Brandram continued with the Savoy cast. Barnett, instead, played the contralto roles in D'Oyly Carte touring companies in 1884, before leaving the D'Oyly Carte Opera Company at the end of that year.

=== Peripatetic performer ===
Barnett appeared with Lillian Russell in Pocahontas, by Sydney Grundy and Edward Solomon, at the Empire Theatre in London before travelling to America with Russell in 1885. In New York, and on tour, she performed in Solomon's shows Billee Taylor, Claude Duval and Polly. She then moved to Australia, where she spent three years, from 1885 to 1888, playing the Gilbert and Sullivan contralto roles (Lady Sangazure in The Sorcerer, Buttercup, Ruth, Jane, the Fairy Queen, Lady Blanche in Princess Ida and Katisha in The Mikado) with J. C. Williamson's opera company. London's The Era noted, "Reports received lately from Australia are so full of the praises of Miss Alice Barnett in her Gilbert and Sullivan impersonations that her appearance … promises to be one of the events of the season." She also appeared as Martha in Faust, Mrs. Privett in Alfred Cellier's Dorothy (with Leonora Braham in the title role), Eliza Dabsey in Billee Taylor, and the Princesse de Gramponeur in Erminie. In 1887, she toured New Zealand with Williamson's Gilbert and Sullivan company and won praise for teaching at the various towns visited by the company.

In October 1888, Barnett returned to London. She appeared as Mrs Shelton in Cellier's Doris at the Lyric Theatre, which was succeeded at the same theatre by The Red Hussar by Henry Pottinger Stephens and Edward Solomon. Barnett was announced beforehand as a cast member for the new piece, but she did not appear. The following year, she toured the British provinces as Martha in Auguste van Biene's production of the Gaiety burlesque Faust up to Date, in which The Era found her "inimitable". This tour lasted for more than a year, taking in all four countries of the United Kingdom. The company followed this with a production of Carmen up to Data, in which Barnett played Micaela. She was a stepsister in Cinderella with the Burns-Crotty Light Opera and the Duchess of Duffshire in In Town. She finally returned to London in 1894 to create another of Gilbert's formidable older women, Dame Hecla Cortlandt in Gilbert and Osmond Carr's His Excellency. "Miss Alice Barnett, as the mighty Dame Hecla, fulfilled the promise of her name, bursting out into flame at the slightest provocation … excruciatingly funny."

After a brief run at the Gaiety Theatre as a replacement in the role of Ada Smith in The Shop Girl, in the summer of 1895, Barnett again travelled to America, where she toured in His Excellency with George Edwardes's Lyric Company. In 1896, she returned to England, touring in The Telephone Girl, by Augustus Harris, F. C. Burnand and Gaston Serpette, after which her husband, John Thanet Dickens, died at their house in south London in August 1896. She again went to America in November of that year for De Koven and Smith's The Mandarin.

=== Last years ===
In 1897 Barnett toured Britain with The Telephone Girl. Beginning in December 1897 she appeared in the Drury Lane pantomime, Babes in the Wood, with Dan Leno. In 1898, Barnett toured the British provinces as Becky Blisset in Billy by Adrian Ross and Osmond Carr, starring with Little Tich. Later in the same year, she appeared with Marie Studholme in Edwardes's production of A Greek Slave, playing the part of Melanopis, in which she toured until May 1899. She then appeared in a third successive touring production, a revival of The Telephone Girl. Later in 1899, Barnett returned to the West End as Madame Rouge in Drink, at the Adelphi Theatre, followed by a farce, Willie's Mrs, at the Strand Theatre. The Era described the play as "a crude and unexpert attempt at farcical comedy," but Barnett received excellent notices for her performance.

Barnett died in London in 1901 of bronchial pneumonia following an operation.
