= The Court for the Trial of Queen Katharine =

Painting by George Henry Harlow

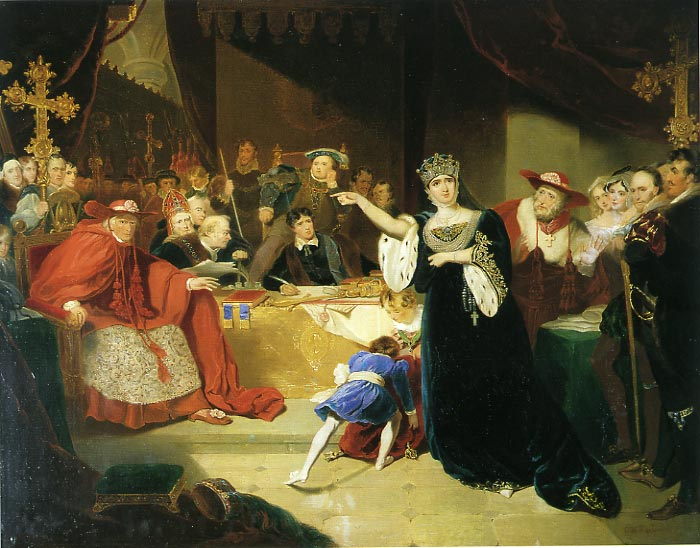
- Artist: George Henry Harlow
- Year: c. 1817
- Type: History painting
- Medium: Oil on canvas
- Dimensions: 78 cm × 102.5 cm (31 in × 40.4 in)
- Location: Royal Shakespeare Theatre, Stratford-upon-Avon

The Court for the Trial of Queen Katharine is an 1817 oil painting by the British artist George Henry Harlow. It combines history painting and portraiture. It depicts the trial scene from William Shakespeare's play Henry VIII with members of the Kemble family playing various roles. Sarah Siddons was well known for playing Catherine of Aragon and this became one of the best-known images of her as it was widely circulated in prints. in addition the painting features her brothers John Philip Kemble as Cardinal Wolsey, Stephen Kemble as Henry VIII, Charles Kemble as Thomas Cromwell and her niece Fanny Kemble as a page. It was produced five years after Siddons had formally retired from the stage. on the strength of its success Harlow was able to double the prices he charged for portraits.

It was displayed at the Royal Academy's 1817 Summer Exhibition at Somerset House, where it was one of the most discussed works. The painting is located at the Royal Shakespeare Theatre in Stratford-upon-Avon in Warwickshire.

== Bibliography ==
- Bennett, Shelley, Leonard, Mark & West, Shearer. A Passion for Performance: Sarah Siddons and her Portraitists. Getty Publications, 1999.
- Hodgson, Barbara. The Shakespeare Trade: Performances and Appropriations. University of Pennsylvania Press, 1998.
- Mole, Tom. Romanticism and Celebrity Culture, 1750–1850. Cambridge University Press, 2009.
- Perry, Gillian. Spectacular Flirtations: Viewing the Actress in British Art and Theatre, 1768–1820. Yale University Press, 2007.
