= Elmy =

Elmy is a surname. Notable people with the surname include:

- Elizabeth Clarke Wolstenholme-Elmy (1833 or 1839 – 1918), English suffrage campaigner
- Mary Elmy (1712–1792), British actress
