= Henry Kemble =

Henry Kemble may refer to:

- Henry Kemble (actor, born 1848) (1848–1907), British actor
- Henry Stephen Kemble (1789–1836), British actor
- Henry Kemble (politician) (1787–1857), British member of parliament
