= Stephen Kemble =

English theatre manager, actor and writer (1758–1822)

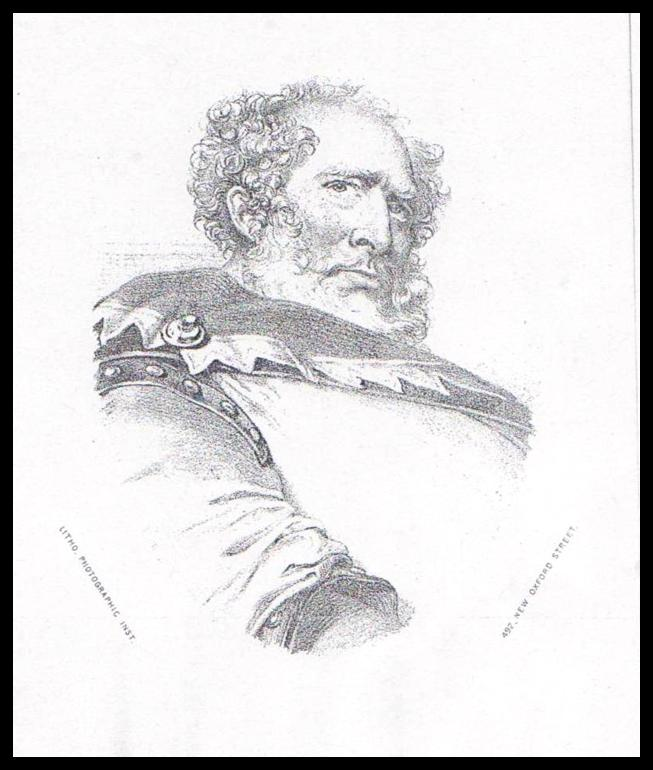
- Stephen Kemble as Falstaff by James Heath
- Born: George Stephen Kemble; 21 April 1758; Kington, Herefordshire, England
- Died: 5 June 1822 (aged 64); Durham, England
- Resting place: Chapel of the Nine Altars, Durham Cathedral, England
- Occupations: Manager, actor, writer
- Spouse: Elizabeth Satchell
- Children: Henry Stephen Kemble
- Parent(s): Roger Kemble; Sarah "Sally" Ward
- Relatives: Kemble family

George Stephen Kemble (21 April 1758 – 5 June 1822) was a successful English theatre manager, actor, and writer, and a member of the famous Kemble family. He was described as "the best Sir John Falstaff which the British stage ever saw" though he also played title roles in Hamlet and King Lear among others. He published plays, poetry and non-fiction.

Kemble wed prominent actress Elizabeth Satchell (1783). His niece was the actress and abolitionist Fanny Kemble.

== Early life and family ==
He was born in Kington, Herefordshire, one of 13 siblings and the second son of Roger Kemble and Sarah "Sally" Ward. His siblings included Charles Kemble, John Philip Kemble and Sarah Siddons. He and his brothers were raised in their father's Catholic faith; his sisters were raised in their mother's Protestant faith.

His daughter Frances Kemble was a music composer who was a favourite of Sir Walter Scott. She married Capt. Robert Arkwright., son of Richard Arkwright Jr. Kemble's son Henry was also an actor.

== Manager ==
Similar to his father, Stephen Kemble became a very successful theatre manager of the Eighteenth-Century English stage. He managed the original Theatre Royal, Newcastle for fifteen years (1791–1806). He brought members of his famous acting family and many other actors out of London to Newcastle. Stephen's sister, Sarah Siddons, was the first London actor of repute to break through the prejudice which regarded summer " strolling", or starring in the provincial theatres, as a degradation.

Stephen Kemble guided the Theatre through many celebrated seasons. The Newcastle audience quickly came to regard itself, that is, as "in a position of great theatrical privilege." The original Theatre Royal was opened on 21 January 1788 and was located on Mosley Street, next to Drury Lane. While in Newcastle upon Tyne Kemble lived in a large house opposite the White Cross in Newgate Street.

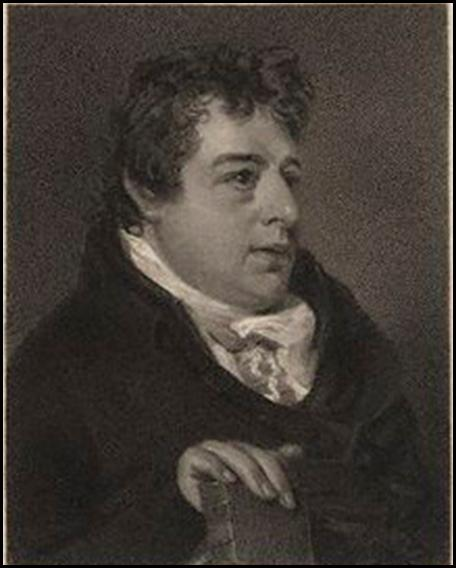
Kemble by John Raphael Smith, National Portrait Gallery

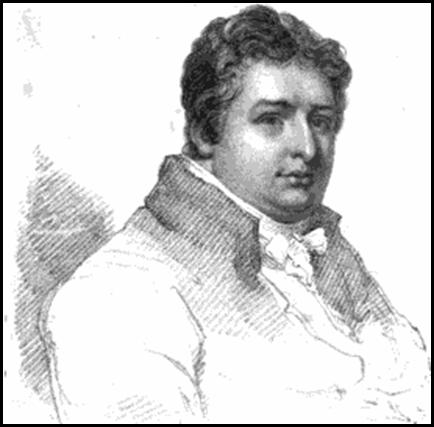
Stephen Kemble

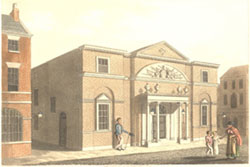
Royal Theatre, Newcastle

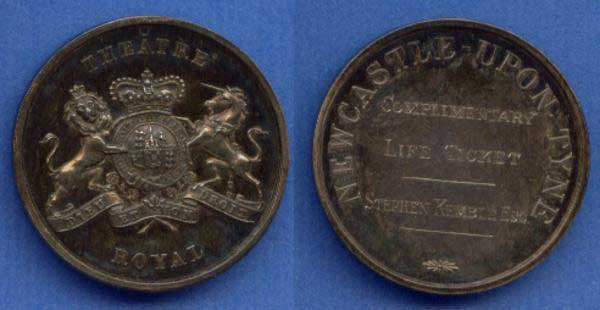
Kemble Theatre Ticket

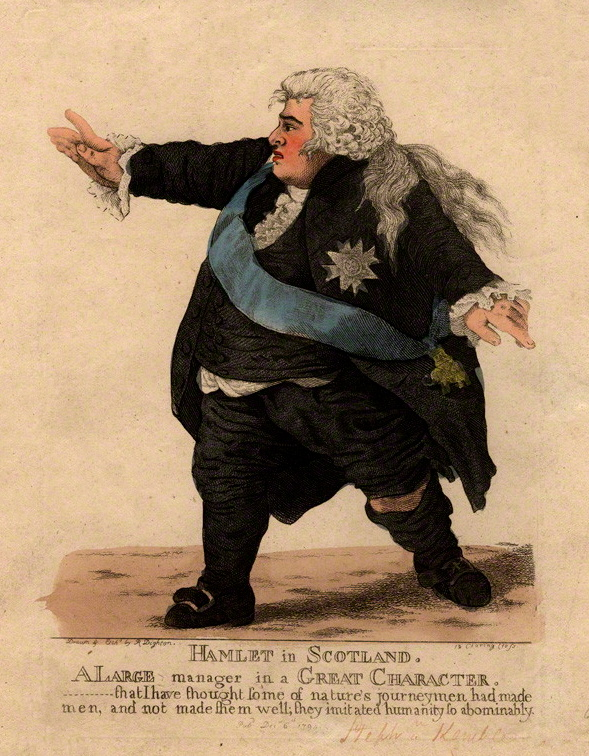
Stephen Kemble as Hamlet 1794

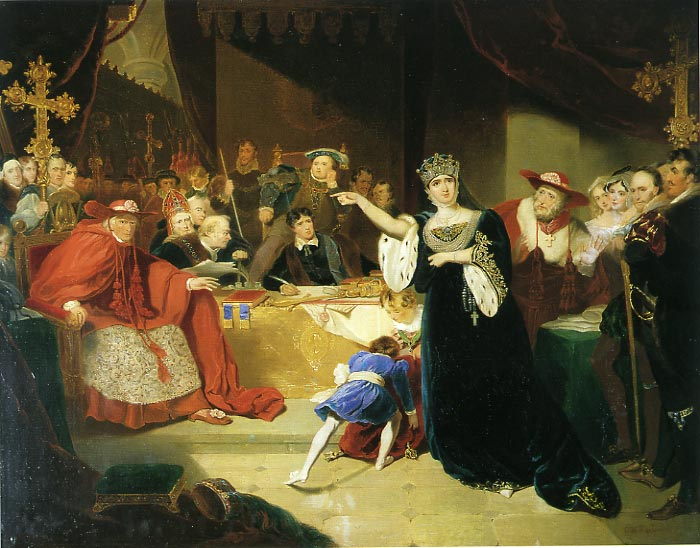
Kemble as Henry VIII in The Court for the Trial of Queen Katharine by George Henry Harlow, 1817

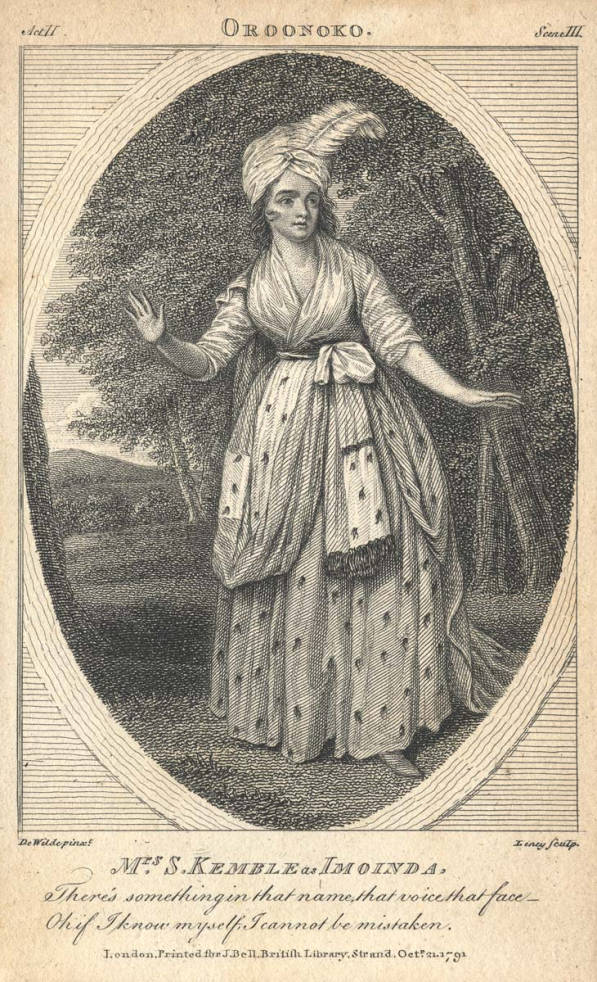
Kemble's wife Elizabeth Satchell in Oroonoko

Stephen Kemble took a temporary 12-month lease on the Theatre Royal, Edinburgh in 1792/3 but initially failed to take a long-term lease. He ran a temporary theatre nearby at the head of Leith Walk 1793/4 under the title of "circus" before securing long-term lease in 1794 and he held this until 1800 although with an interval created by Harriet Pye Esten. He also managed other theatres; The Theatre Royal, Glasgow (eventually replaced by Tivoli Theatre (Aberdeen)) (1795); Chester; Lancaster; Sheffield (1792); Berwick-upon-Tweed (1794); theatres in Northumberland; Alnwick (where he built a theatre, 1796) and rural areas on the theatre circuit. From Newcastle, Kemble ran the Durham circuit (1799), which included North Shields, Sunderland, South Shields, Stockton and Scarborough and the opening for the Stockton Races at Stockton Racecourse. He also managed theatres at Northallerton and Morpeth. In Broadway, he performed in the Assembly Room of the Lygon Arms (formerly known as the White Hart Inn). He also managed Whitehaven and Paisley (1814), Northampton Theatre, the theatre at Birmingham and Theatre Royal, Dumfries, Portsmouth. For a short time in 1792, actor Charles Lee Lewes assisted Stephen Kemble in the management of the Dundee Repertory Theatre

He supported the careers of many leading actors of the time such as Master Betty, his wife Elizabeth Satchell, his sister Elizabeth Whitlock, George Frederick Cooke, Charlotte Wattell, Harriet Pye Esten, John Edwin, Joseph Munden, Grist, Elizabeth Inchbald, Pauline Hall, Wilson, Charles Incledon, Egan. His nephew Henry Siddons (Sarah Siddons' son) made his first appearance on stage in Sheffield (October 1792), his younger brother Charles Kemble, Thomas Apthorpe Cooper, John Liston, John Emery, Daniel Egerton, William Macready.

Stephen presented London stars such as Edmund Kean, Alexander and Elizabeth Pope (née Elizabeth Younge), Mrs. Dorothea Jordan, his brother John Philip Kemble, Wright Bowden, his sister Sarah Siddons, Elizabeth Billington, Michael Kelly (tenor), Anna Maria Crouch, and Charles Lee Lewes.

== Actor ==
He was also famous for playing Falstaff. In 1783, Stephen made his debut with his brother John in London. Contemporary critics acclaimed that in this role Kemble achieved the "optimum balance between comedy and gravity." After his performance in London at Theatre Royal, Drury Lane in 1802, the Morning Chronicle wrote that "It is to be regretted that his associations in the country prevent him from accepting a permanent engagement in London." Kemble would return to play Falstaff in London at Covent Garden (1806) and the Drury Lane (1816), for which he received great acclaim. After Kemble's death, The Edinburgh Literary Journal wrote, "[Stephen] Kemble was perhaps the best Sir John Falstaff which the British stage ever saw."

Kemble also played the title roles in Hamlet, King Lear, Othello, Shylock in The Merchant of Venice and many other roles.

For The London Magazine John Taylor wrote, "Mr. Stephen Kemble was an actor of considerable merit." Taylor writes about Kemble's commitment to address injustice through theatre: "All characters of an open, blunt nature, and requiring a vehement expression of justice and integrity, particularly those exemplifying an honest indignation against vice, he delivered in so forcible a manner, as to show. obviously that he was developing his own feelings and character. This manner was very successfully displayed in his representation of the Governor, Sir Christopher Curry, in the opera of Inkle and Yarico."

Taylor writes of Kemble's reputation in the provincial theatre circuit: "Stephen Kemble, who was an accurate observer of human life, and an able delineater of character and manners, was so intelligent and humorous a companion, that he was received with respect into the best company in the several provincial towns, which he occasionally visited in the exercise of his profession."

== Writer ==
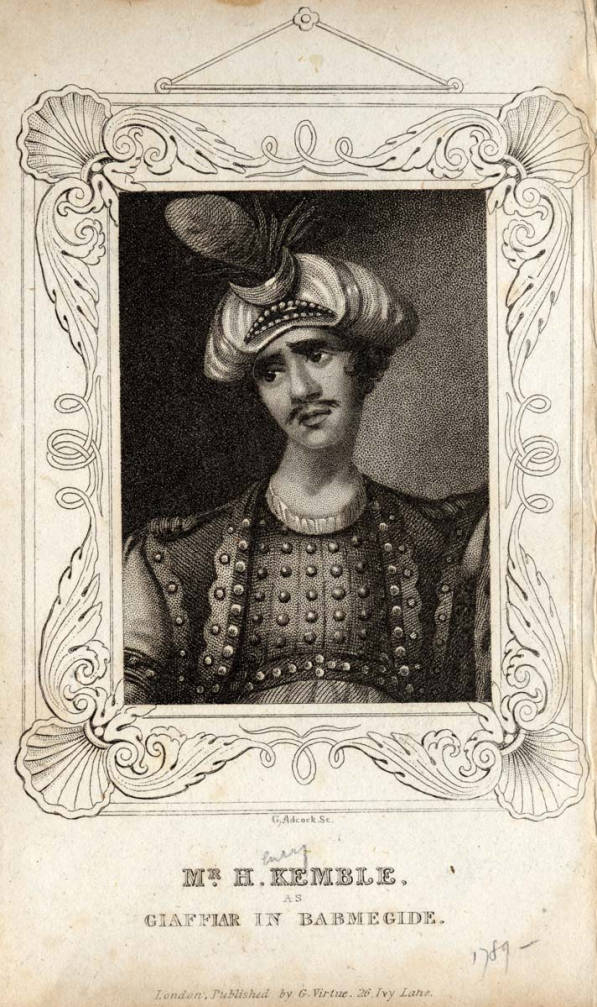
Kemble's son Henry, actor

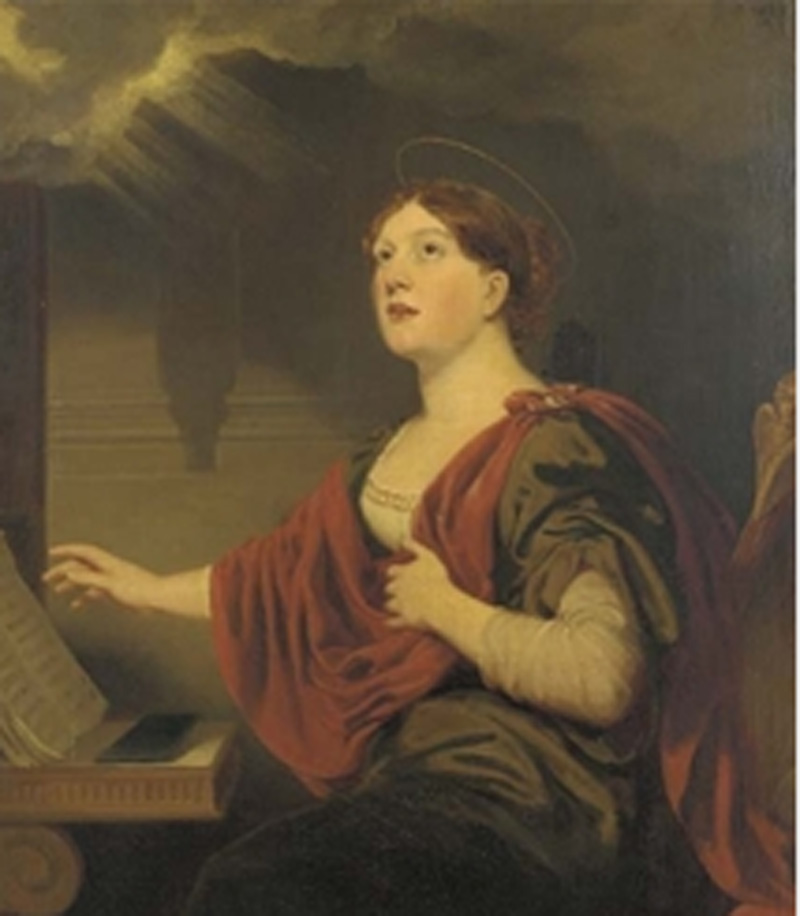
Kemble's daughter Frances (Kemble) Arkwright, music composer

He also published a dramatic play The Northern Inn (1791). The play was also known as The northern lass, or, Days of good Queen Bess, The good times of Queen Bess. The play was first produced on 16 August 1791, as The northern inn, or, The good times of Queen Bess, at the Haymarket Theatre (i.e. Little Theatre or Theatre Royal, Haymarket).

Kemble also published a collection of his writings Odes, Lyrical Ballads and Poems on various occasions (1809). About Kemble's poetry, John Wilson (Scottish writer) stated, "Stephen Kemble was a man of excellent talents, and taste too; and we have a volume of his poems... in which there is considerable powers of language, and no deficiency either of feeling or of fancy. He had humour if not wit, and was a pleasant companion and worthy man." Of particular interest is Kemble's writing is his reflections on contemporaneous events such as the Battle of Trafalgar, the death of Lord Nelson, the death of Robert Burns, his conversion to the abolitionist movement and support of the Slave Trade Act 1807, the death of his brother-in-law William Siddons.

Stephen published a play with his son Henry Kemble (1789–1836) entitled Flodden Field (1819) based on the Battle of Flodden (1513), which was performed by Thomas S. Hamblin. The text is based on Sir Walter Scott's Marmion: a tale of Flodden field. In six cantos. The play was first performed at the Theatre Royal, Drury Lane, on Thursday evening, 31 December 1818. The European Magazine, and London Review reported that at its debut "the whole [play] went off without opposition, and its repetition, was received with applause."

An essay of his entitled "In the Character of Touchstone, Riding on an Ass" was published by William Oxberry in his book The Actor's Budget (1820).

== Retirement ==
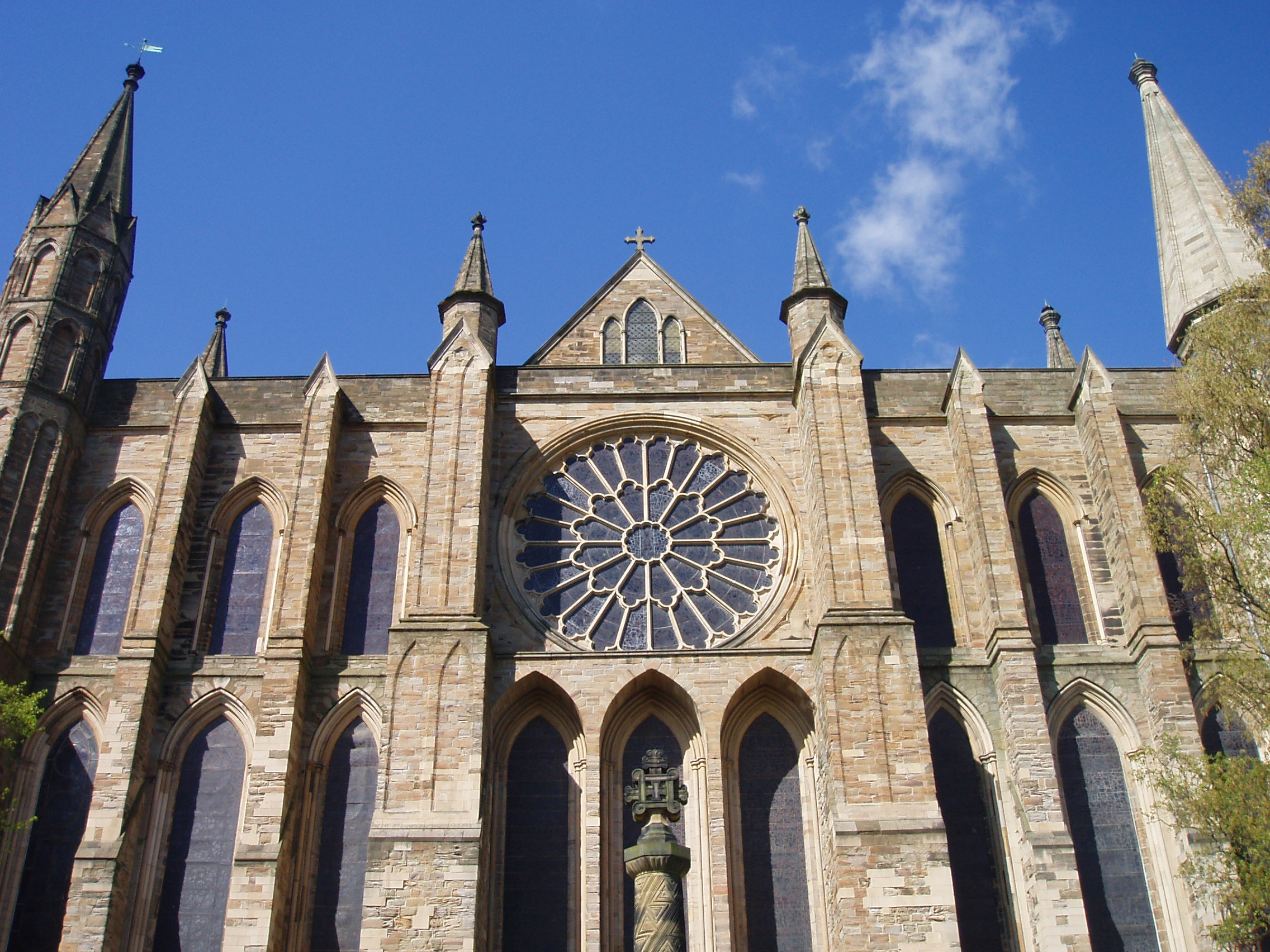
Kemble's Burial Place: Chapel of Nine Alters, Durham Cathedral

Kemble moved from Newcastle to Durham, and lived in retirement after 1806. In later life, Kemble took on less responsibilities in management and made only occasional appearances on the stage.

He was a close friend of another famous Durham resident, the 3 ft 3 inch tall Polish dwarf, Józef Boruwłaski. When these two friends - one little and one large - strolled along the wooded paths of the city, they were reported to be an interesting sight for the people of Durham.

Kemble's last performance at Durham was in May 1822, a fortnight before his death at the age of 64. He was fondly remembered by the natives of Durham, and was honoured with a burial in the Chapel of the Nine Altars in the Durham Cathedral. His close friend Józef Boruwłaski is buried at the west end of the cathedral's nave, beneath the north-west tower. The grave is marked with his initials J.B on a flagstone. The heyday of Durham theatre came to an end with Kemble's death.

In 2013, lines from his ode to a Guinea were inscribed on the rim of a £2 coin issued to commemorate the 350th anniversary of the Guinea coin. "What is a Guinea? 'Tis a splendid thing"."
