= Ann Hatton =

British writer (1764–1838)

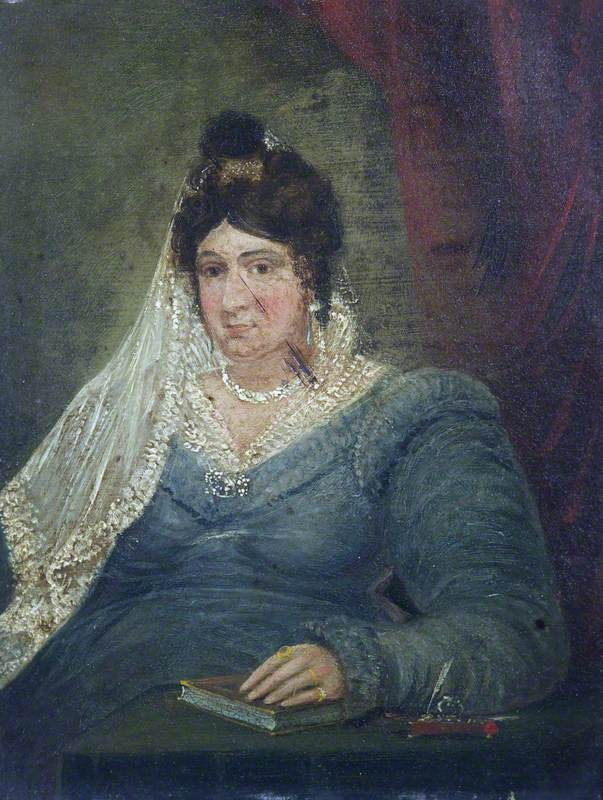
- Ann Hatton by William Watkeys
- Born: Ann Julia Kemble; 29 April 1764; Worcester, England, Kingdom of Great Britain
- Died: 26 December 1838 (aged 74); Swansea, Wales, United Kingdom of Great Britain and Ireland
- Occupation: Writer
- Spouse: William Hatton (m. 1792)
- Parent: Roger Kemble (father)
- Relatives: Kemble family
- Writing career
- Pen name: Ann of Swansea

Ann Julia Hatton (née Kemble, published as Ann of Swansea; 29 April 1764 – 26 December 1838), was a popular novelist in Britain in the early 19th century and author of Tammany, the first known libretto by a woman.

== Biography ==
Ann Hatton was born in Worcester, the daughter of strolling player Roger Kemble. She was the sister of the actors Sarah Siddons and John Philip Kemble. Other members of the Kemble family were also actors. Ann was apprenticed to a mantua maker before going on the stage.

In 1783, at the age of nineteen, she married an actor, C. Curtis, but soon found out that he was already married. Ann was left in such straits financially that in that year she appealed for relief from the public in a newspaper advertisement, and even attempted suicide in Westminster Abbey. To survive she earned her living as a "model" in a notorious London bagnio, or brothel. It was in such a house that she was accidentally shot in the face. This was reported in local newspapers, which mention her "immoral avocation", but also her "proud and strong mind."

In 1792 Ann married William Hatton, and a year later the couple sailed to America. In 1794 Ann Hatton's tremendously popular Tammany: The Indian Chief was given its première on Broadway. This was the first known libretto by a woman, and the first major opera libretto written in the United States on an American theme.

By 1799 Ann and William had returned to Britain, and settled at Swansea in south Wales; where they ran a bathing-house and lodgings near the seashore until William's death in 1806. From 1806 to 1809 Ann kept a dancing school in Kidwelly, but from 1809 onwards spent the remainder of her life in Swansea and became a well-known writer. Between 1810 and 1831 she wrote poetry, and fourteen novels featuring gothic themes for Minerva Press, using the pseudonym of "Ann of Swansea".

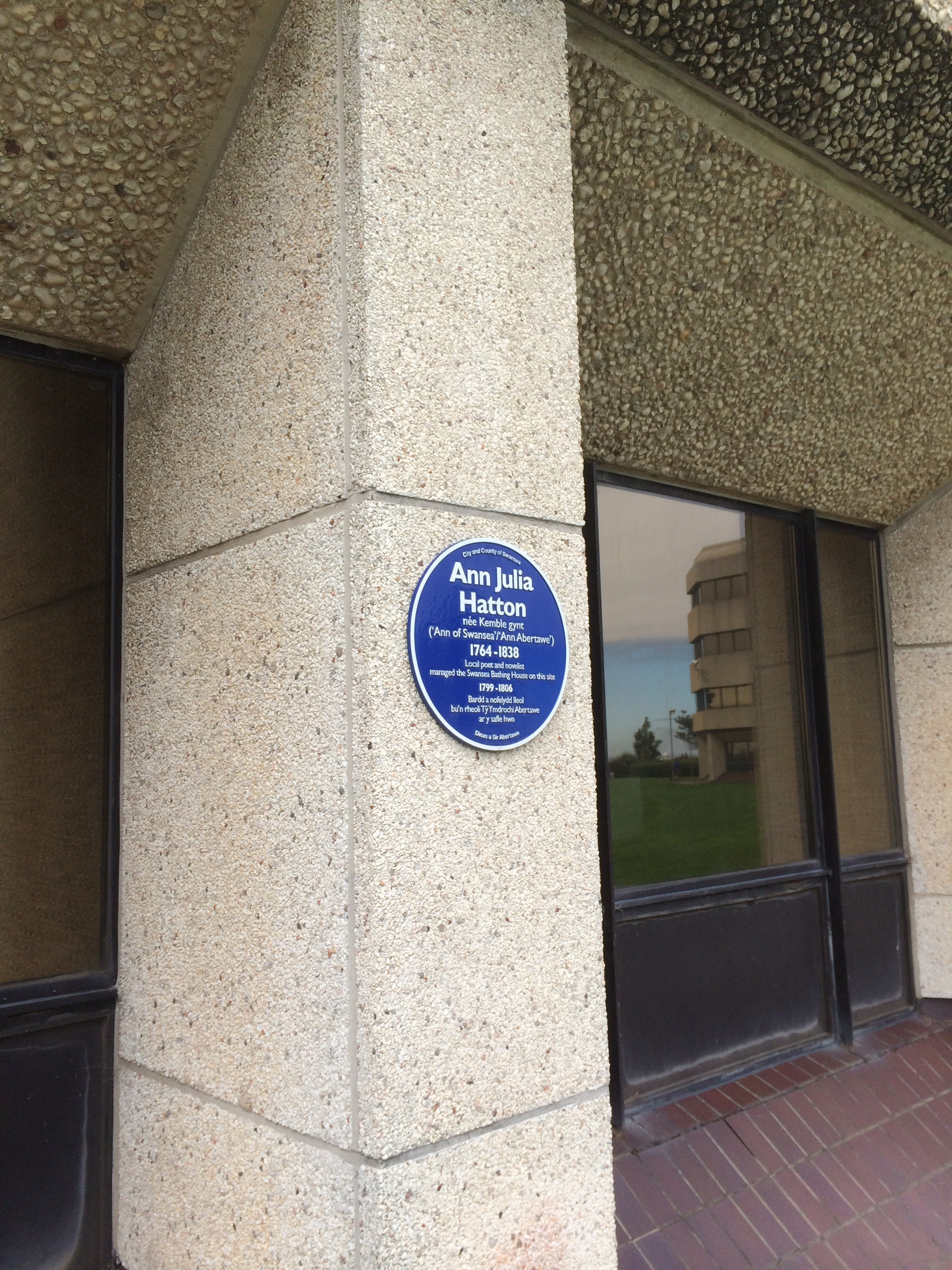
Blue plaque on Swansea Civic Centre

Ann's mixing precariously with various classes and suffering times of poverty gave her the insight of living through, as well as seeing, the social ills of her times. Her work responded to the popular taste of the time for gothic fiction, social satire, and stories of moral progress, with stereotypical women as her characters: nuns are gothic, wives harangue, mothers are fussy, and old maids bad-tempered.

A portrait of Ann in 1835 (at the age of 71) by William Watkeys is held in Swansea Museum. She died in Swansea.

== Works ==
- Poems on Miscellaneous Subjects (1783) (under name Ann Curtis)
- Cambrian Pictures (1810) (first novel, under the name Ann of Swansea)
- Poetic Trifles (1811)
- Sicilian Mysteries (1812)
- "Conviction, or Is She Innocent" (1814)
- "Secret Avengers" (1815)
- Chronicles of an Illustrious House, or The Peer, the Lawyer and the Hunchback (1816)
- "Gonzalo de Baldivia" (1817)
- "Secrets in Every Mansion" (1818)
- "Cesario Rosalba, or The Oath of Vengeance" (1819)
- Lovers and Friends (1821)
- Guilty or Not Guilty, or A Lesson for Husbands (1822)
- "Woman's A Riddle" (1824)
- "Deeds of an Olden Time" (1826)
- "Uncle Peregrine's Heiress" (1828)
- "Gerald Fitzgerald, or An Irish Tale" (1831).

== See also ==
- List of Minerva Press authors
- Minerva Press
