= Elizabeth Kemble =

Elizabeth Kemble may refer to:

- Elizabeth Satchell (1763–1841), British actress who married Stephen Kemble
- Elizabeth Whitlock (1761–1836), English actress and fifth child of Roger Kemble
