= Kemball =

Kemball is a surname, and may refer to:

- Arnold Burrowes Kemball (1820–1908), British Army officer
- Charles Kemball (1923–1998), Scottish chemist
- Colin Kemball (1928–2004), English athlete
- George Kemball (1859–1941), British Army officer
- John Kemball (1939–2021), Royal Air Force officer

== See also ==
- Kemble (disambiguation)
