= Kemble family =

Family of English actors

- Family
- Country: England
- Place of origin: England
- Founder: Roger Kemble (1722–1802); Sarah Ward (1735–1807)

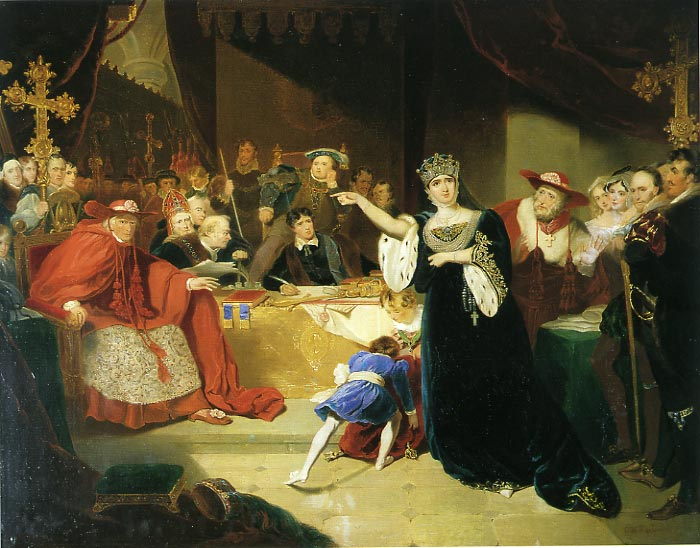
The Court for the Trial of Queen Katharine by George Henry Harlow, 1817

Kemble is the name of a family of English actors, who reigned over the English stage for many decades. The most famous were Sarah Siddons (1755–1831) and her brother John Philip Kemble (1757–1823), the two eldest of the twelve children of Roger Kemble (1721–1802), a strolling player and manager of the Warwickshire Company of Comedians, who in 1753 married an actress, Sarah Ward. Roger Kemble was born in Hereford and was a grand-nephew of Father John Kemble, a recusant Catholic priest, who was hanged in that city in 1679. Three younger children of Roger, Stephen Kemble (1758–1822), Charles Kemble (1775–1854), and Elizabeth Whitlock (1761–1836), were also actors, while Ann Hatton was a novelist.

== Popular culture ==
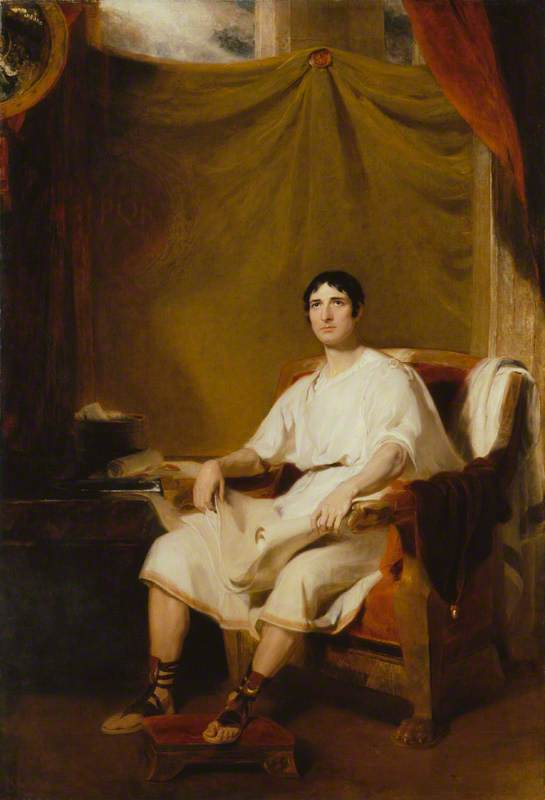
John Philip Kemble as Cato by Thomas Lawrence, 1812.

In George Henry Harlow's famous painting The Court for the Trial of Queen Katharine, he depicted many of the Kemble family members. The subject of the painting comes from Henry VIII, Act II, Scene iv, and the refutation of Cardinal Wolsey, charged with obtaining Henry's divorce from his Queen, Katherine. The production was mounted by John Philip Kemble when he took over the management of Covent Garden in 1806. Harlow was a personal friend of the Kemble family, and this picture is homage to his friends. John Philip Kemble clothed in scarlet plays Wolsey; his brother Charles Kemble (in black) has the part of Thomas Cromwell and sits behind the table. Immediately behind and above him is Stephen Kemble as Henry. The sister, Sarah Siddons, is Katherine.

== Extended family ==
The tradition was continued by two daughters of Charles Kemble and Maria Theresa Kemble: actress and Shakespearean reader Fanny Kemble (1809–1893) and Adelaide Kemble (1815–1879), an opera singer. Both Sarah Siddons's son Henry Siddons and Stephen Kemble's son Henry Kemble became actors.

Among later members of the Kemble family, mention may also be made of Charles Kemble's grandson, Henry Kemble (1848–1907), a sterling and popular London actor, and of Alice Barnett, a great-granddaughter of Stephen Kemble, who performed leading roles as a comic actress and singer in the works of Gilbert and Sullivan. Two 20th-century members were Violet Kemble-Cooper and Lillian Kemble-Cooper. The Scottish socialite Jane Beadon was also a descendant of the Kemble family.

== See also ==
- Portrait of John Philip Kemble, a 1799 painting by William Beechey
