= Old Price Riots =

1809 riots in London

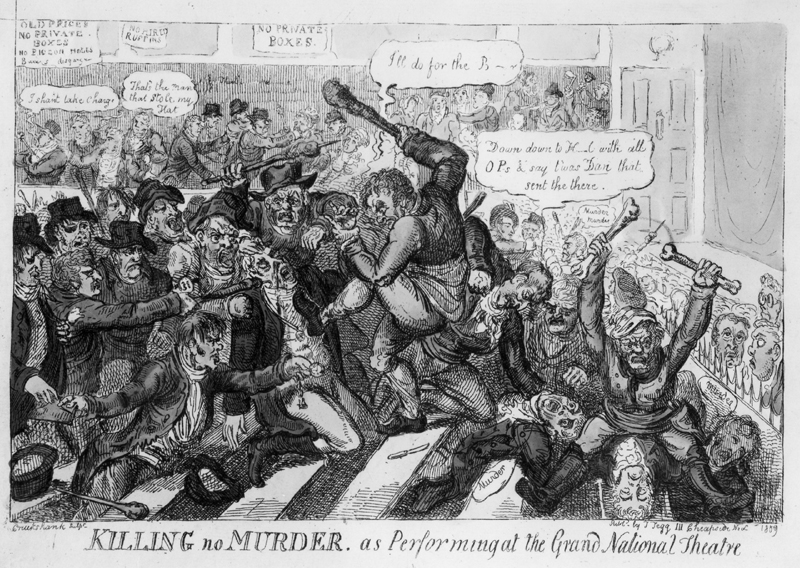
Cartoon of the riots by Isaac Robert Cruikshank

The Old Price Riots of 1809 (also sometimes referred to as the O.P. or OP riots) were caused by rising prices at the new Theatre at Covent Garden, London, after the previous one had been destroyed by fire. Covent Garden was one of two "patent" theatres in London in the nineteenth century, along with Drury Lane. When Drury Lane was burned down, Covent Garden became the premiere theatre in that time. The riots lasted three months, and ended with John Philip Kemble, the manager of the theatre, being forced to make a public apology. It was said that as many as 20 people died and many more were wounded during this event.

== Causes ==
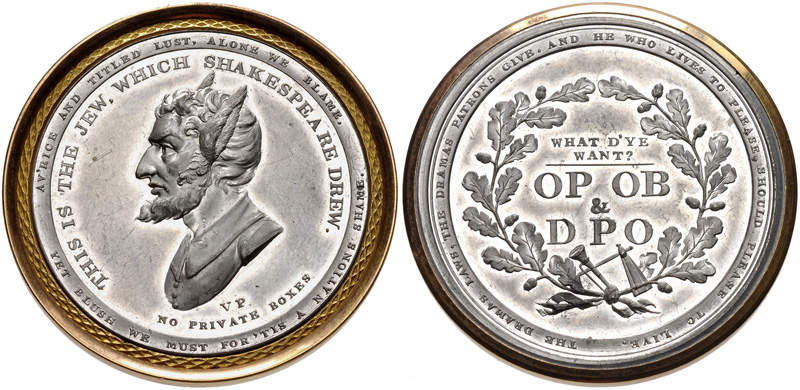
Antisemitic medal, depicting Shylock as a symbol of greed and the new prices.

On 20 September 1808, the original Covent Garden Theatre was destroyed by a fire along with most of the scenery, costumes and scripts. The damage was estimated at £250,000. However, a public subscription was introduced by Prince Frederick, Duke of York and Albany, George III and Hugh Percy, 2nd Duke of Northumberland, which contributed £76,000. The new theatre opened on 18 September 1809. The cost of constructing and furnishing the building, however, was so high that the management was forced to raise the prices from six shillings to seven for the boxes, from 3 shillings and sixpence to four shillings for the pit, and the third tier, usually reserved for the public, was converted into private boxes at a rent of £300 per year. The gallery price was unchanged but often referred to as "pigeon holes" since people inside could only see the legs of the performers.

On the opening night, riots broke out during a performance of Macbeth and continued throughout the play. At the end, the audience refused to leave so Kemble sent for the Bow Street police and other private militias, but this only made the situation worse, and the rioters did not disperse until 2am. After the first night, the rioters only came in at half price time, and the inside of the theatre was covered with banners and slogans. Newspapers and journals reported frequently on the riots, citing as central to its continuation a perceived suppression of customary liberties and a lack of dialogue between the patrons and the management. At one point, a coffin was carried in with the message "Here lies the body of the new price, which died of the whooping cough on 23 September 1809, aged 6 days". The riots were to last another 64 days. However, unlike earlier riots, little damage was done to the theatre and the whole affair was characterized by a "spirit of fun". The rioters even had a name for themselves: the OPs. The OPs stretched across class and cultural lines, ranging from businessmen to labourers, and pushed Kemble to lower the prices. Kemble did so (and also issued an apology) and the situation returned to normal, until he tried to maintain half the number of private boxes at the start of the next season – the riots started again, forcing him to withdraw his plan.

== Daniel Mendoza and the Old Price Riots ==
In an attempt to quell the rioters Kemble hired the boxer Daniel Mendoza and his associates to contain them. This tactic misfired and resulted in increased violence, as shown in the contemporary caricature by Isaac Robert Cruikshank, Killing No Murder as Performing at the Grand National Theatre . Mendoza can be seen at the centre, uttering the words 'Down down to H--l with all OPs & say twas Dan that sent thee there.' Mendoza, who had lost his championship in 1795 and was now in his mid forties, was already semi-retired; he had turned down a return match against Lee in 1807 saying that he was devoted only to teaching the sport. It seems that his participation in the OP Riots also lost him following with his supporters amongst the poorer folk of London, who now saw him fighting on behalf of the 'toffs'. Some of Mendoza's biographers therefore see the incident as a turning point in his popularity, although he still gave occasional demonstration bouts.

== History of the Old Price Riots ==
- Robinson, Terry F. National Theatre in Transition: The London Patent Theatre Fires of 1808-1809 and the Old Price Riots. BRANCH: Britain, Representation, and Nineteenth-Century History. Web. 29 March 2016.

== Earlier incidents ==
There had been previous riots in 1762 when the management of Covent Garden Theatre had threatened to raise seating prices.
