= Alexander Bicknell =

- Died: 1796

Alexander Bicknell (died 1796), author, was an industrious littérateur of the last quarter of the eighteenth century, whose writings received ridicule or faint praise in the British periodical Monthly Review. It has been suggested that he also wrote under the pseudonym of Mrs Elizabeth Steele. He died 22 August 1796 in St. Thomas's Hospital, London.

== Works ==
- History of Edward Prince of Wales, commonly termed the Black Prince, octavo, 1777
- Life of Alfred the Great, King of the Anglo-Saxons, octavo, 1777
- The Putrid Soul, a Poetical Epistle to Joseph Priestley, LL.D., quarto, 1780.
- The Patriot Historical of Lady Rewards of Good Nature'.
- The Benevolent Man, a Novel'.
- Prince Arthur, an Allegorical Romance'.
- The Memoirs of Mrs Sophia Baddeley, late of Drury Lane Theatre, by Mrs Elizabeth Steele (pseudonym), 1787.
- Doncaster Races, or the History of Miss Maitland, a True Tale, in a series of letters, 2 vols. duodecimo, 1790.
- A History of England and the British Empire, duodecimo, 1791.
- The Grammatical Wreath, or a Complete System of English Grammar, duodecimo, 1790.
- Instances of the Mutability of Fortune, selected from Ancient and Modern History, octavo, 1792.
- Philosophical Disquisitions on the Christian Religion, addressed to Soame Jenyns, Esquire, and Dr. Kenrick'.

It is stated on the title-page of No. 9 that Bicknell edited Captain J. Carver's Travels through the Interior Parts of North America, octavo, 1778, and Mrs. George Anne Bellamy's Apology for the Life of George Anne Bellamy, 6 vols. duodecimo, 1785. (Note: Monthly Review, vols. lvii. lviii. lxiii. lxxviii., New Series, ii. iv. v. ix.; Gentlemen's Magazine; Watt's Bibl. British)
