= Lovers and Friends (novel) =

1821 novel

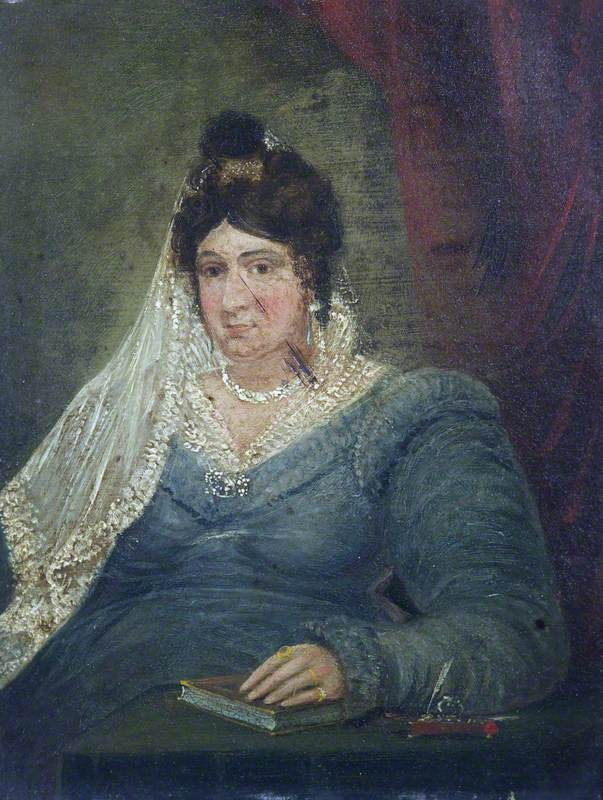
- Ann Hatton in 1835.
- Author: Ann Hatton
- Language: English
- Publisher: Minerva Press
- Publication date: 1821
- Publication place: United Kingdom
- Media type: Print

Lovers and Friends; or, Modern Attachments is an 1821 novel by the British author Ann Hatton, written under her pseudonym Ann of Swansea. It was published in five volumes by Minerva Press, one of the last to bear the name of the publishing house.

== Bibliography ==
- Highfill, Philip H., Burnim, Kalman A. & Langhans Edward A. A Biographical Dictionary of Actors, Volume 7, Habgood to Houbert: Actresses, Musicians, Dancers, Managers, and Other Stage Personnel in London, 1660-1800. SIU Press, 1982
- Hudson, Hannah Doherty. Romantic Fiction and Literary Excess in the Minerva Press Era. Cambridge University Press, 2023.
- Snodgrass, Mary Ellen. Encyclopedia of Feminist Literature. Infobase Publishing, 2014.
