= Mary Elmy =

British actress (1712–1792)

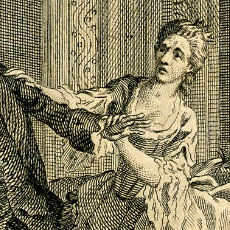
- in Hamlet (detail of print from 1773)
- Born: Mary Morse; 1712
- Died: April 1, 1792 (aged 79–80); Knightsbridge
- Occupation: actress
- Known for: stage actress in London and Dublin
- Spouse: Mr Elmy or Mr Williams

Mary Elmy, born Mary Morse (1712–1792), was a British actress who appeared in roles at leading theatres in Dublin and London. She led a long life and she was noted for her role of Gertrude appearing with Spranger Barry in Hamlet.

== Life ==
Elmy was born in 1712 and came to notice in maybe 1732 but almost definitely by 18 October 1733 when "Miss Morse" was at Drury Lane playing Charlotte in Oroonoko, adapted from Aphra Behn's novel story of Surinam. In January 1734 she became Mary Elmy although details of her husband are not known and his name may have been James Elmy or even Mr Williams.

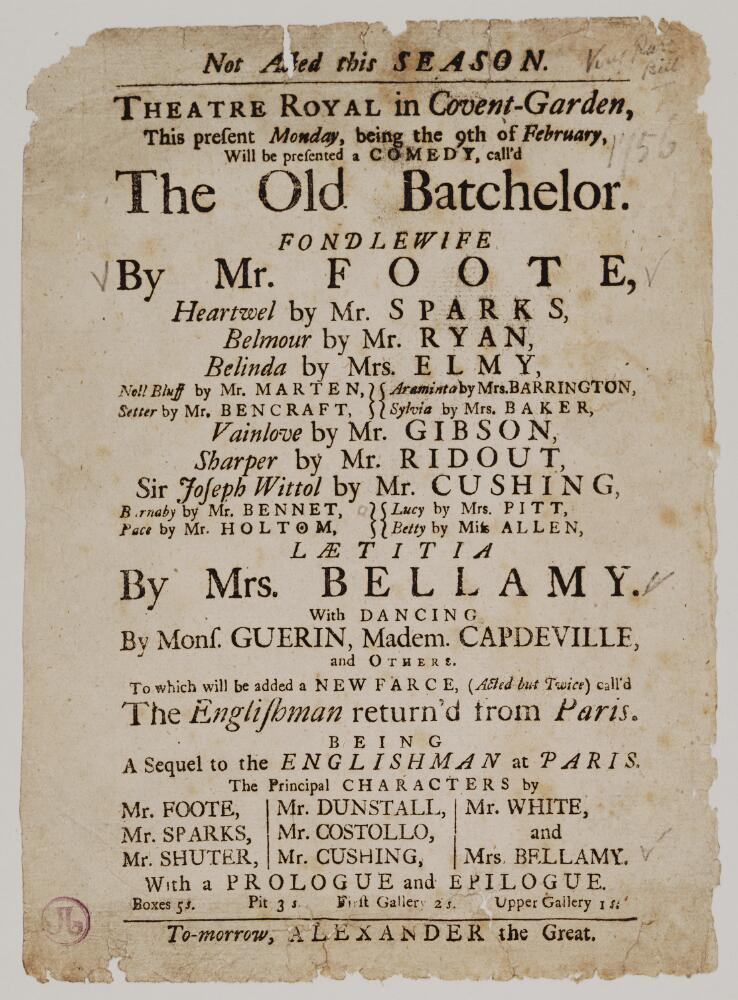
Elmy in The Old Bachelor at Covent Garden in 1756

In 1737 Elmy appeared in another Aphra Behn story. The play "The Rover" had been originally written by Behn herself. Her debut as one of the main characters Florinda was on 11 April 1737. The following year she moved to Dublin where she appeared at the Aungier Street Theatre before joining the company of the Smock Alley Theatre. Her debut there was on 11 December 1739 and she was there for several years before returning to London in 1744.

In 1745 she had to take over Fanny Furnival's part in Dublin after the audience turned against Furnival as a result of her rivalry with George Anne Bellamy. In 1747 she was in The Provok'd Husband at Drury Lane and she remained at that theatre throughout the 1740s.

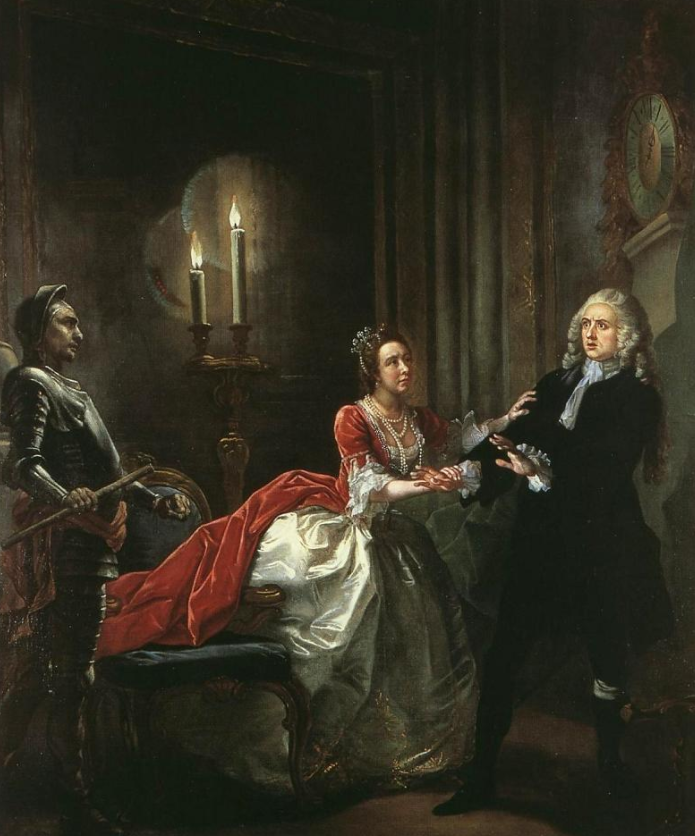
with Spranger Barry in Hamlet, III-4

In 1750 it was claimed that Elmy was making "a debut" in John Vanbrugh's The Provok'd Wife when she appeared as Belinda at Covent Garden. Actually this was the start of her steady work as she remained at Covent Garden but was never in the top rank of actresses. She appeared in King Lear and with Barry in Hamlet which was well received. Charles Jennens' new edition of Shakespeare's play 'Hamlet, Prince of Denmark; a Tragedy' in 1773 included a picture of the final scene with Mary Elmy playing a leading role.

Elmy died in Knightsbridge on 1 April 1792 and her will gave £20 to a cousin in London and £100 each to four of her cousins in Norwich and £10 each to the children of one of them. The remaining estate was left to a cousin, also in Norwich. A final amendment (a codicil) to the will directed that £50 be given to the actress Ann Crawford.
