= Fanny Furnival =

British actress and singer (fl. 1731–1752)

Elizabeth Furnival
- Born: unknown 17??
- Occupation: Actor
- Known for: a woman who played Hamlet in 1741
- Spouse: Thomas Furnival
- Partner: Roger Kemble

Elizabeth "Fanny" Furnival or "Mrs Kemble" (fl. 1731–1752) was a British actress and singer who appeared in theatres in London and Dublin. She notably took the role of Hamlet in 1741. She lost a vendetta with George Anne Bellamy. She appeared as "Mrs Kemble" but Roger Kemble married another.

== Life ==
She first came to notice when she and her husband, Thomas Furnival, joined the company at the Haymarket Theatre, London for the season of 1730-31. She appeared as "Lady Grace" in The Provok'd Husband on 10 February 1731. She and her husband are not seen on London playbills until 1736 and it is thought that the two of them must have been touring outside London between 1731 and 1736.

She and her husband moved to Dublin in 1739 where they both found work. In 1741 she notably, as a woman, appeared as Hamlet. She and her husband appeared to have separated whilst she was appearing at Dublin's Aungier Street theatre. Thomas Furnival had a continuing career as an actor in London and died in 1773.

In 1745 she had to leave Dublin when she showed poor judgement during her vendetta with another notable actress George Anne Bellamy. Bellamy and her patron Mrs Butler had conspired to ensure that Bellamy got the part of Constance in King John at the Smock Alley Theatre. Later Bellamy took the part of Cleopatra in All for Love which Furnival felt was her part. She had to take the lesser part of Octavia. Furnival decided to appear on stage, without warning, in All for Love wearing Bellamy's special dress which included diamonds. The dress actually belonged to Bellamy's patron Mrs Butler. Mrs Butler spotted her dress and appealed to the audience for justice. The crowd chanted, "'No more Furnival!", and Mary Elmy had to take over Furnival's role.

Roger Kemble first entered the theatre by joining Smith's company at Canterbury in 1752 where Furnival was the principal actress. Whilst he was there they became partners and it was agreed that he would marry Furnival. Although Furnival appeared as "Mrs Kemble" it is thought that they never married. Furnival and Kemble then moved to Birmingham under the management of John Ward, whose daughter Kemble would eventually marry.
