= George Anne Bellamy =

Irish actress

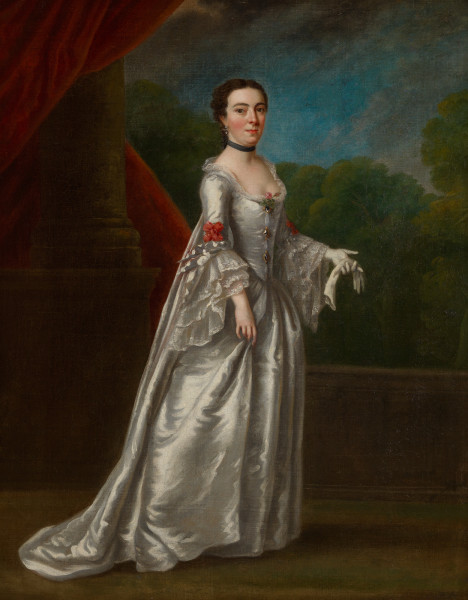
- by F Lindo
- Born: 23 April 1731; County Fingal
- Died: 16 February 1788 (aged 56); London
- Employer: Drury Lane Theatre

George Anne Bellamy (née O'Hara; 23 April 1731 – 16 February 1788) was an Irish actress. She took leading roles at Theatre Royal, Drury Lane.

Her success was rapid, participating in the rivalry for popular favor in Romeo and Juliet in 1750, playing with Garrick at Drury Lane, while Barry and Mrs. Cibber played at Covent Garden. She was thought the more charming of the Juliets. Mrs. Bellamy was popular and she was received in the best society. She forfeited her reputation by her liaisons.

Her last appearance was at Drury Lane on 24 May 1785 in her own benefit concert. She was unable to act, but spoke a short address to the audience. The same year she published "An Apology for the Life of George Anne Bellamy" in six volumes. These memoirs are believed to have been ghost written from her notes by Alexander Bicknell. She died in poverty in 1788 in Edinburgh.

== Biography ==
Bellamy was born, by her own account, at Fingal, Ireland on St. George's Day 1731.

"George Anne" was a name given by mistake for Georgiana. Officially George Anne Bellamy, she decided to keep this name and use it in her professional career. She was the daughter of minor actress, Mrs Bellamy, (née Seal) and James O'Hara, 2nd Baron Tyrawley, who paid for her education.

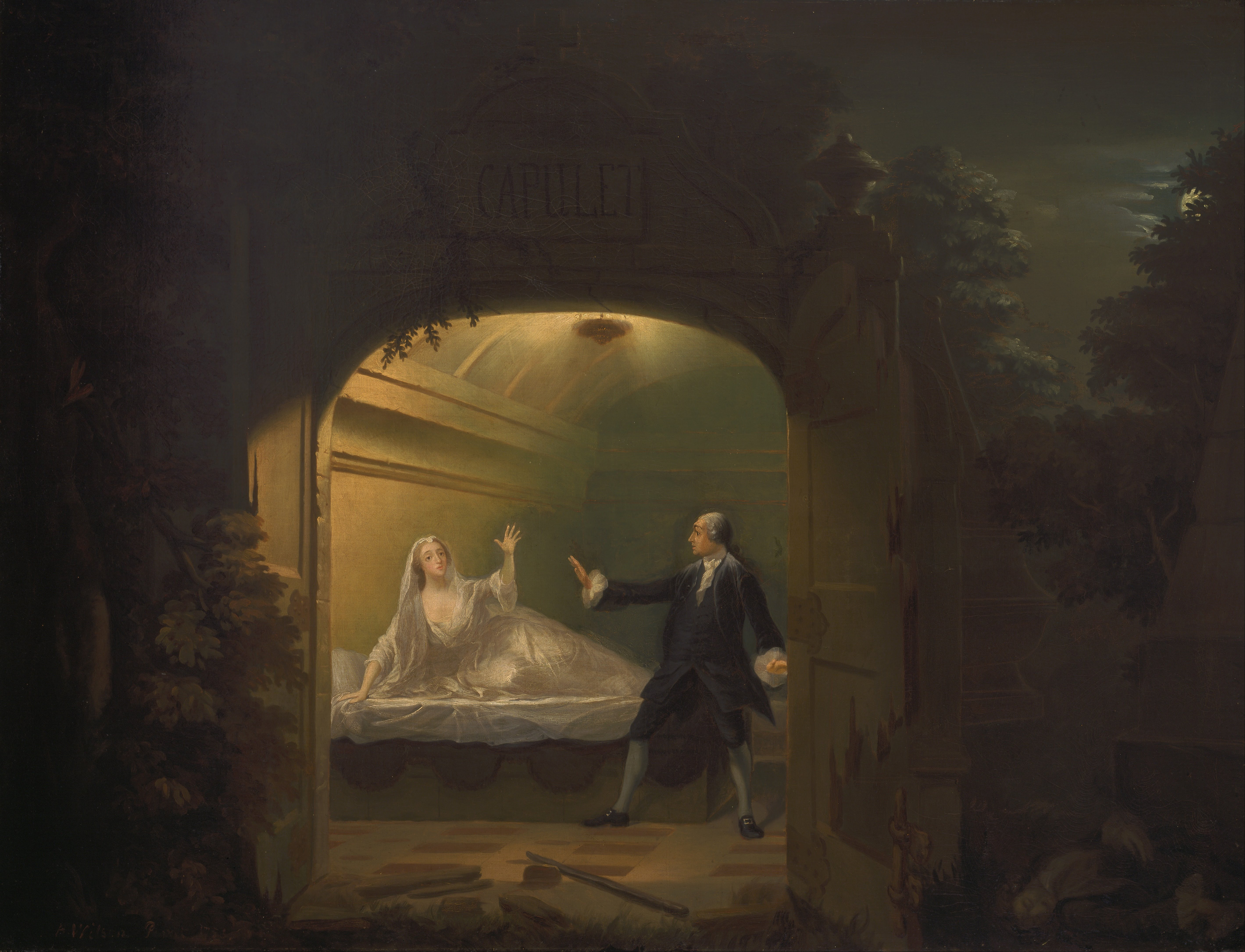
David Garrick and George Anne Bellamy in "Romeo and Juliet", Act V, Scene iii

Devastated that he was not her biological father, he left England and ceased all communication with her mother.

Bellamy was put out to nurse until she was two and then between ages four and eleven, she was enrolled in a convent in Boulogne. She spent most of her childhood moving between places. When she wasn't in school, she spent her time living with various carers and family members. She was given an annual allowance of 100l by her father on the condition that she did not see her mother, who eventually convinced her to move back in with her which caused her allowance to be withdrawn.

Despite the success she enjoyed in her career, she led a tumultuous life, beset with debt and misfortune. When she died, she had little money to her name and was living under the rules of the King's bench prison in her final residence in Eliot's Row, St George's Fields.

== Career ==
Bellamy had a successful career that, although begun by luck, was subsequently built on talent, hard work and determination.

While living with her mother she met Mr. Rich of Covent Garden Theatre as well as his daughters. By chance Mr. Rich heard her reciting passages from Othello one day while playing with his daughters. Impressed, he engaged her as a performer, and she made her professional debut on 22 November 1744, aged thirteen playing Monimia in The Orphan. Prior to her professional debut, she had already performed in Covent Garden in one of her first roles, a non-speaking part as the servant to Colombine in the Harlequin Barber in 1741. In 1745 she was engaged by Mr. Sheridan and accompanied him to Dublin, Ireland, as a theatrical recruit, where she remained for two seasons. Whilst she was there she found patronage with a Mrs Butler, who helped her to unseat Fanny Furnival from the role of Constance in King John. Bellamy took that role and Furnival, in an ill-planned revenge, stole Bellamy's dress to later appear on stage. The dress actually belonged to Butler, who got the audience to chant Furnival off the stage.

Bellamy returned to England in 1748 and spent the next few years performing in Covent Garden and Drury Lane. Between 1760 and 1764, she mainly performed in Dublin and Glasgow. She officially retired from the stage in 1784 and died four years later on 16 February 1788.

One of her most significant roles was Juliet in Shakespeare's Romeo and Juliet, which she performed during the "Battle of the Romeos". The Battle of Romeos was a period of twelve days in 1750 in which Covent Garden and Drury Lane theatre put on productions of Romeo and Juliet simultaneously. In Covent Garden it was David Garrick and Bellamy, while Drury Lane had Spranger Barry and Susannah Cibber playing the title roles. At age nineteen, Bellamy was said to be more successful than Cibber, an already well-established tragic actress. "Several critics found Bellamy, young and beautiful, more physically appropriate for Juliet and more pleasing in the first half of the play"

Bellamy was known for being very strong willed, and some suggested that her determination contributed to her success as much as her acting abilities. One such example was the casting of Miss Wilford as Cordelia. Bellamy, unhappy with this decision, decided to take matters into her own hands and created and distributed hand-out sheets to the audience, stating that the role had been taken from her the night before. Aware that Miss Wilford had previously not been well received in this role, she said that, should the audience prefer, she would be ready to step into the part. As the curtain rose, the audience called so loudly for Bellamy that Wilford had no choice but to hand over the role.
