= George Henry Harlow =

English painter (1787–1819)

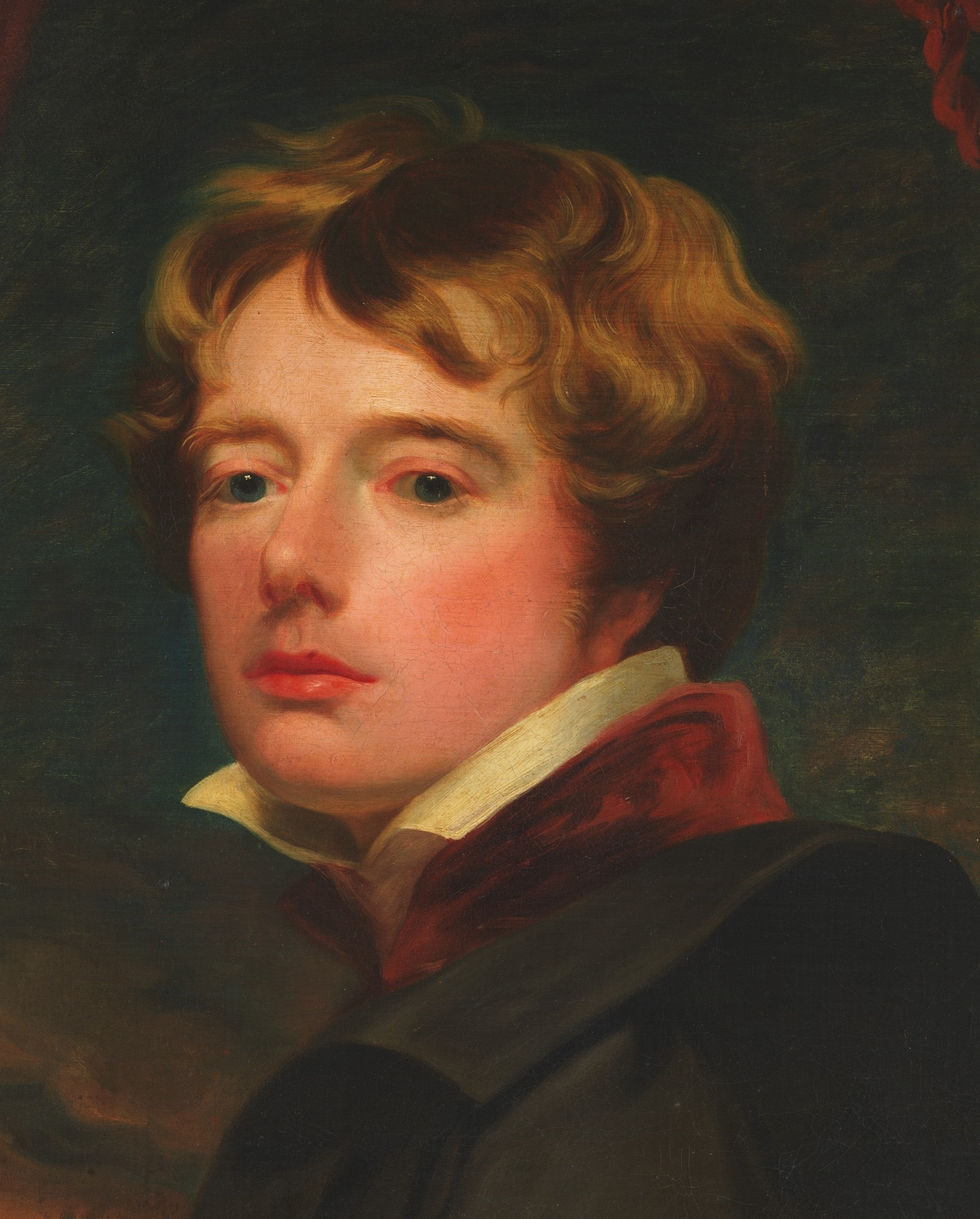
Self-portrait of Harlow, Metropolitan Museum of Art

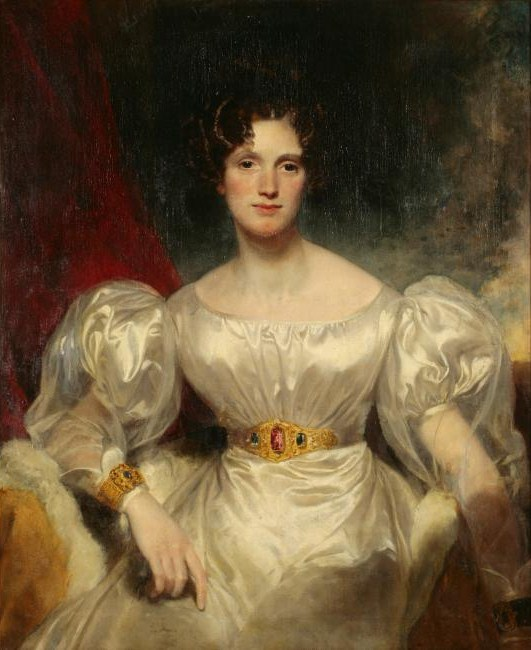
Portrait of a woman

George Henry Harlow (10 June 1787 – 4 February 1819) was an English painter known mostly for his portraits.

== Life ==
Harlow was born in St. James's Street, London, the posthumous son of a China merchant, who after some years' residence in the East had died about five months before his son's birth, leaving a widow with five infant daughters. Harlow was sent when quite young to Dr. Barrow's classical school in Soho Square, and subsequently to Mr. Roy's school in Burlington Street. He was for a short time at Westminster School, but having shown a predilection for painting, he was placed under Henry De Cort, the landscape-painter. He next worked under Samuel Drummond, A.R.A., the portrait-painter, but after about a year entered the studio of Sir Thomas Lawrence (president of the Royal Academy). This step is said to have been taken at the suggestion of Georgiana, duchess of Devonshire; but Harlow's natural affinity to Lawrence's style in painting would be quite sufficient to account for his choice. Harlow paid Lawrence handsomely for his admission and the right to copy, but according to the contract was not entitled to instruction.

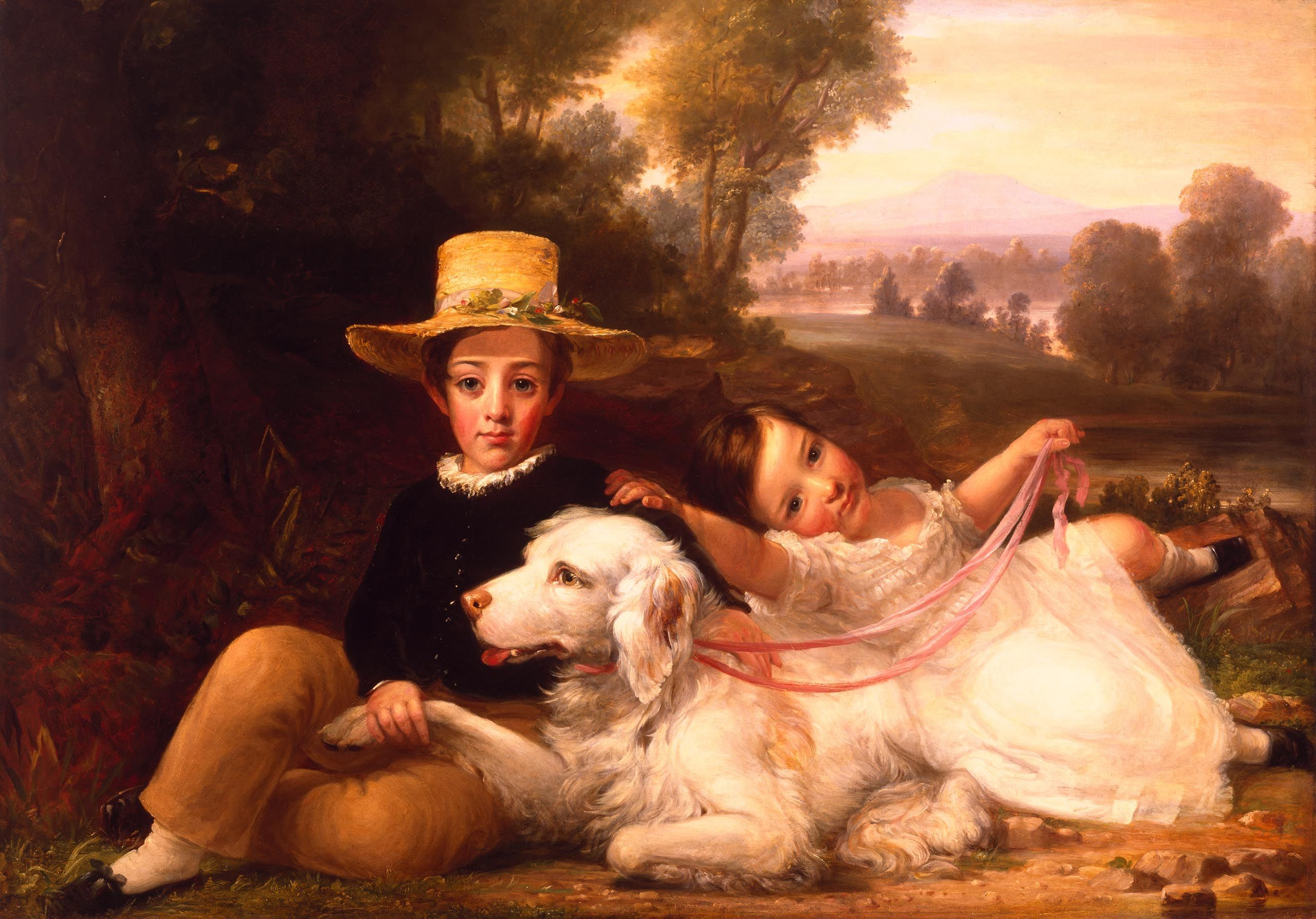
Portrait of Two Children

Harlow decided to devote himself to painting, and refused an offer of a writership in the East India trade made by his father's friends. He spent about eighteen months in Lawrence's studio, copying his pictures, and occasionally drawing preliminary portions of Lawrence's own productions. A difference about Harlow's work for one of Lawrence's pictures led to a breach with Lawrence, and Harlow rendered reconciliation impossible by painting a caricature signboard for an inn at Epsom in Lawrence's style and with Lawrence's initials affixed to it.

Harlow henceforth pursued an original system of art education. He inveighed strongly against all academical rules and principles. Young, headstrong, and impatient of restraint, with a handsome person and amiable disposition, he was generally popular in society. He affected, however, an extravagance in dress far beyond his means, a superiority of knowledge, and a license of conversation which gave frequent offence even to those really interested in the development of his genius. His foibles led his friends to nickname him "Clarissa Harlowe." He worked, however, with industry and enthusiasm in his art. He possessed a power of rapid observation and a retentive memory which enabled him to perform astonishing feats, like that of painting a satisfactory portrait of a gentleman named Hare, lately dead, whom Harlow had only once met in the street. Though openly opposed to the Royal Academy, he was a candidate for academician, but he only received the vote of Henry Fuseli.

He exhibited for the first time at the Academy in 1804, showing a portrait of Dr. Thornton. In later years he exhibited many other portraits. His practice in this line was extensive. His portraits are well conceived, and, though much in the manner and style of Lawrence, have a character of their own. His portraits of ladies were always graceful and pleasing. He was less successful, owing to his defective artistic education, in historical painting, in which he aspired to excel. His first exhibited historical pictures were Queen Elizabeth striking the Earl of Essex, at the Royal Academy, 1807, and The Earl of Bolingbroke entering London, at the British Institution, 1808.

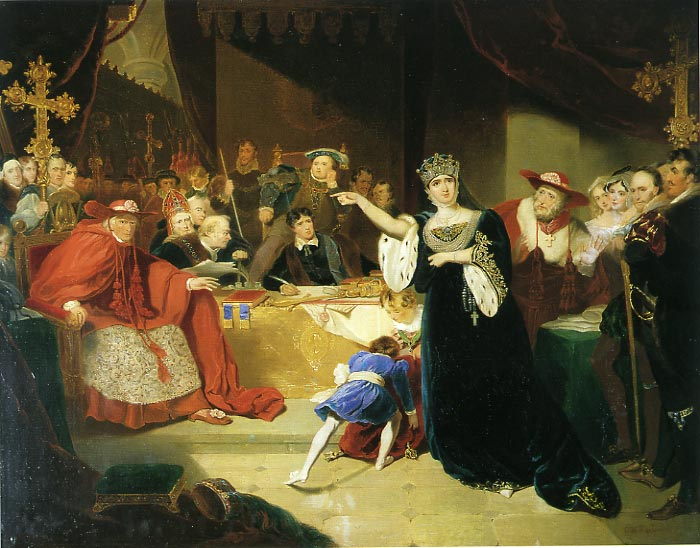
The Court for the Trial of Queen Katharine (1817)

In 1815 he painted Hubert and Prince Arthur for William Leader, a wealthy M.P., who subsequently exchanged the picture for portraits of his daughters. In 1814 he painted a set of portraits of the actor Charles Mathews in various characters, which attracted general attention. It was engraved by W. Greatbach for Edmund Yates' Life of Mathews.

Early in his career Harlow had made sketches of performers in the theatre, notably of the actress Sarah Siddons, who retired in 1812. Later he reworked some of these drawings into paintings such as one showing Siddons in the sleepwalking scene from Macbeth, shown at the British Institution in 1815, and another showing the letter scene from the same play. A commission from the music teacher Thomas Welsh to paint Siddons as Queen Katharine in Shakespeare's Henry VIII. This was begun from memory, but subsequently the actress, at Welsh's request, gave the painter a sitting. While painting the portrait, Harlow decided to expand the picture into the "Trial Scene" from the same play, introducing portraits of the various members of the Kemble family and others. Welsh, though not consulted by Harlow concerning this change of plan, behaved generously. The picture was exhibited at the Royal Academy in 1817, and excited great public interest. It was neither well composed nor well executed, and owed much to the criticism and suggestions of Fuseli, whose portrait Harlow was painting at the time. Still, the portrait of Mrs. Siddons herself as the queen will remain one of the most striking figures in English art. Harlow's next picture, The Virtue of Faith, at the Royal Academy, lacked originality, and had less success. It was purchased by his friend Mr. Tomkisson, who cut it into pieces for the sake of the heads.

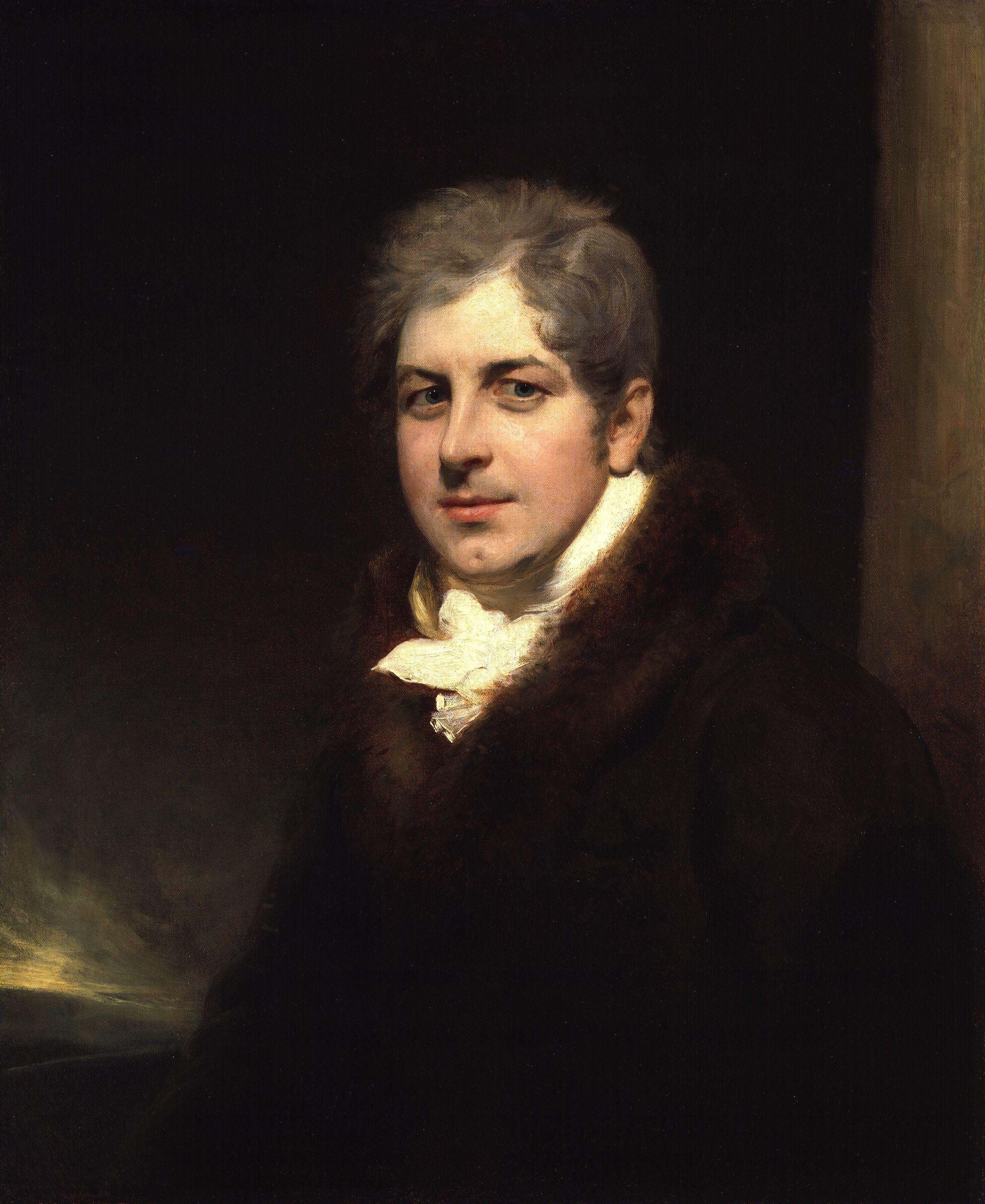
Portrait of Robert William Elliston

In 1818 Harlow, conscious of deficiencies in his executive powers, visited Italy to study the old masters. At Rome he was fêted and flattered in every direction. Canova was especially attracted by him, and obtained him an introduction to the pope. Harlow, however, worked very hard, and completed a copy of Raphael's Transfiguration in eighteen days. He was elected a member for merit of the Academy of St. Luke at Rome, an unusual distinction for an English artist, and was invited to paint a self-portrait for the Uffizi gallery of painters at Florence. He painted a picture of Wolsey receiving the Cardinal's Hat in Westminster Abbey, and presented it to the Academy at Rome.

His artistic progress in Italy was remarkable, but on his return to England on 13 January 1819 he was seized with a glandular affection of the throat, which being neglected, proved fatal on 4 February. He was in his thirty-second year. He was buried under the altar of St. James's, Piccadilly, and his funeral was attended by the eminent artists of the day. An exhibition of his principal works was held in Pall Mall. His collections, including many sketches, were sold by auction 21 June 1819.

Harlow is one of the most attractive figures in the history of English painting. His works only suggest what he might have achieved. Many of his portraits were engraved, and those of James Northcote, Fuseli, Thomas Stothard, William Beechey, John Flaxman, amongst others, were highly esteemed. His self-portrait, painted for the gallery at Florence, was engraved for Ranalli's Imperiale e Reale Galleria di Firenze. A drawing from it by J. Jackson, R.A., was bequeathed to the trustees of the National Portrait Gallery in 1888 by the painter's nephew, G. Harlow White. Another drawing by himself was engraved by B. Holl for theLibrary of the Fine Arts. He introduced his own portrait into the background of The Trial of Queen Katharine. A portrait of the Prince of Wales (later King George IV) by Harlow was engraved in mezzotint by W. Ward.

== Sources ==
This article incorporates text from a publication now in the public domain: "Harlow, George Henry". Dictionary of National Biography. London: Smith, Elder & Co. 1885–1900. (Note: references prefixed with "via DNB" are in the DNB article but have not been independently verified.)

- via DNB: Cunningham's Lives of Eminent British Painters, Sculptors and Artists, 1829-33.
- via DNB: Elmes's Annals of the Fine Arts, vols. ii-iv.
- via DNB: Arnold's Library of the Fine Arts, ii. 245
- via DNB: Redgrave's Dict. of Artists
- via DNB: Jerdan's Autobiography, vol. iii. chap. v.
- via DNB: J. T. Smith's Nollekens and his Times, vol. ii.
- Bennett, Shelley; Leonard, Mark; West, Shearer (1999). Asleson, Robyn (ed.). A Passion for Performance: Sarah Siddons and her Portraitists. Getty Publications. p. 87. ISBN 9780892365579. Free download available.
