= John Philip Kemble =

English actor-manager (1757–1823)

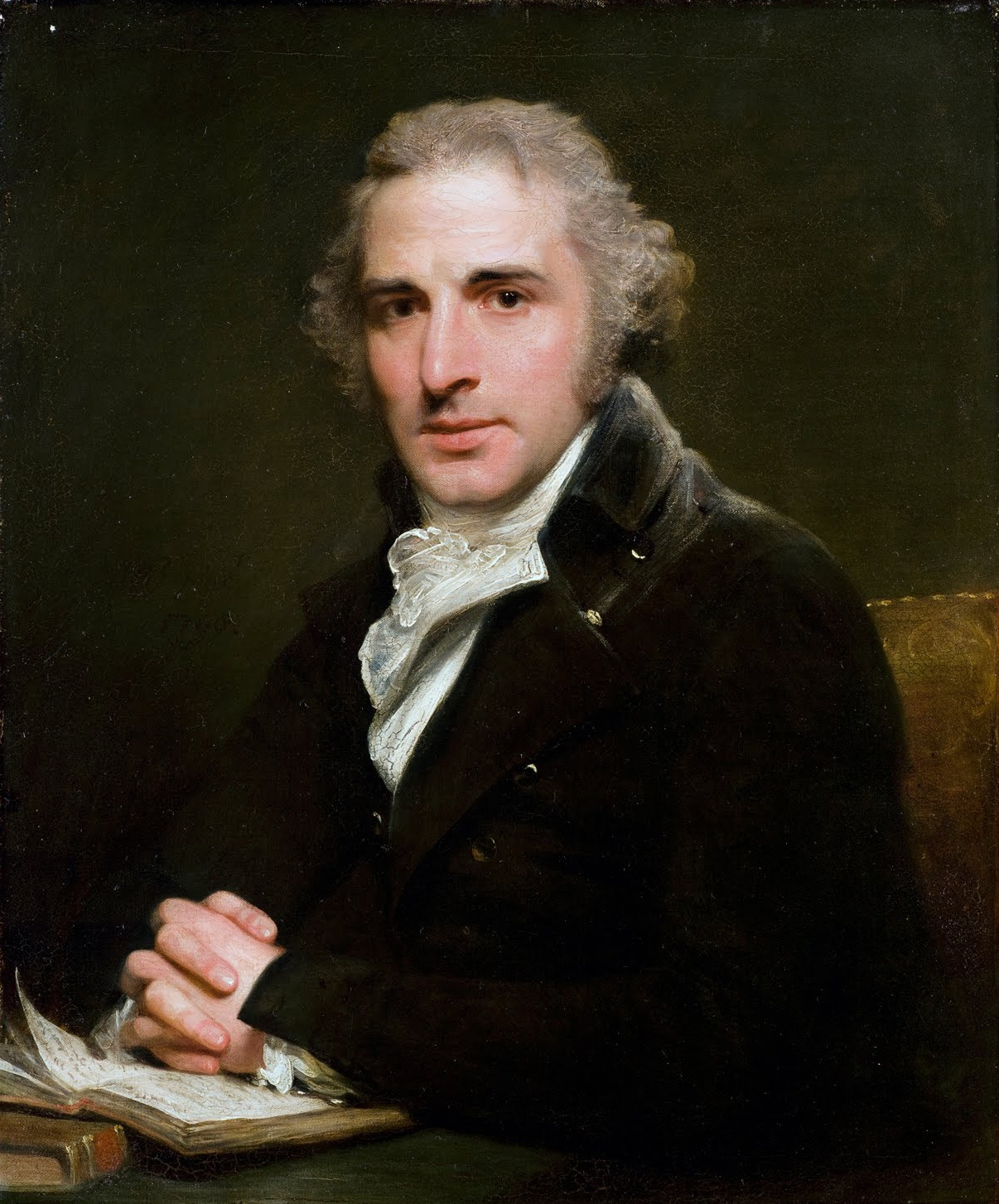
- Portrait of John Philip Kemble by Sir William Beechey, 1799
- Born: 1 February 1757; Prescot, Lancashire, England
- Died: 26 February 1823 (aged 66); Lausanne, Switzerland
- Occupation: Actor-manager
- Years active: 1761–1817
- Spouse: Priscilla Hopkins Brereton
- Parent(s): Roger Kemble; Sarah Ward
- Relatives: Sarah Siddons (sister); Charles Kemble (brother); Stephen Kemble (brother); Ann Hatton (sister); Elizabeth Whitlock (sister)

Signature
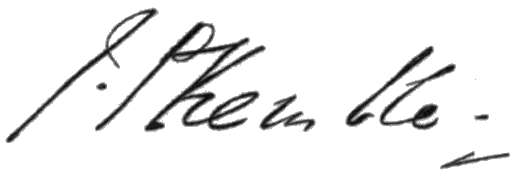

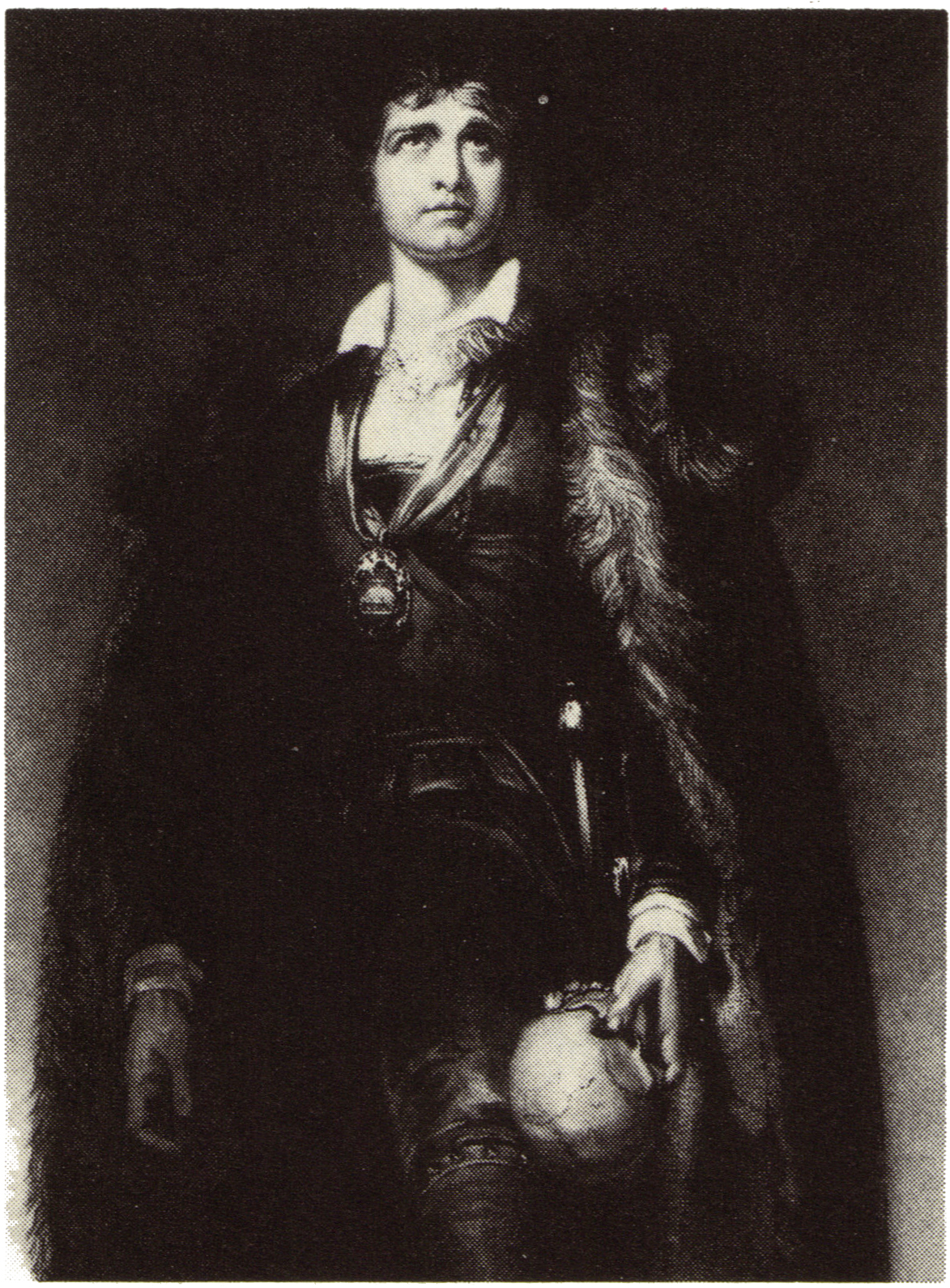
John Philip Kemble as Hamlet, from an engraving of a painting by Sir Thomas Lawrence (1802)

John Philip Kemble (1 February 1757 – 26 February 1823) was a British actor. He was born into a theatrical family as the eldest son of Roger Kemble, actor-manager of a touring troupe. His elder sister Sarah Siddons achieved fame with him on the stage of the Theatre Royal, Drury Lane. His other siblings, Charles Kemble, Stephen Kemble, Ann Hatton, and Elizabeth Whitlock, also enjoyed success on the stage.

== Early life ==
The second child of Roger Kemble, the manager of the travelling theatre company the Warwickshire Company of Comedians, he was born at Prescot, Lancashire. His mother being a Roman Catholic, he was educated at Sedgley Park Catholic seminary (now Park Hall Hotel), near Wolverhampton, and the English college at Douai, France, with the intent to become a priest. At the end of the four years' course, he still felt no vocation for the priesthood, and returning to England he joined the theatrical company of Crump & Chamberlain. His first appearance was as Theodosius in Nathaniel Lee's tragedy of that name at Wolverhampton on 8 January 1776.

In 1778, Kemble joined the York company of Tate Wilkinson, appearing at Wakefield as Captain Plume in George Farquhar's The Recruiting Officer; in Hull for the first time as Macbeth on 30 October, and in York as Orestes in Ambrose Philips's Distresset Mother. In 1781 he obtained a "star" engagement in Dublin, making his first appearance there on 2 November as Hamlet. He also achieved great success as Raymond in The Count of Narbonne, a play taken from Horace Walpole's The Castle of Otranto.

== Drury Lane ==
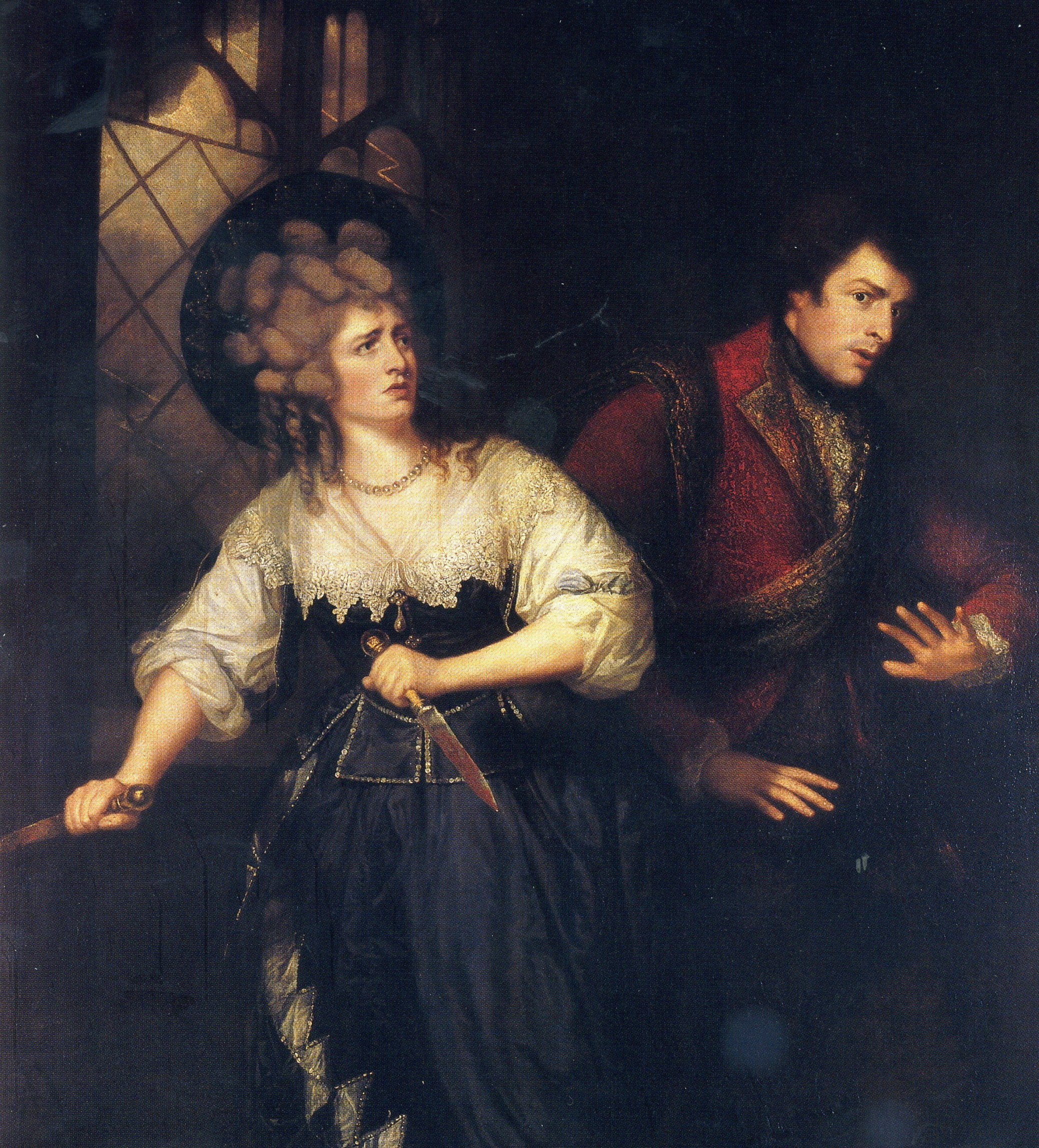
John Philip Kemble and Sarah Siddons, in "Macbeth", painted by Thomas Beach in 1786, now housed at the Garrick Club in London.

Gradually he won for himself a high reputation as a careful and finished actor, and this, combined with the greater fame of his sister, Sarah Siddons, led to an engagement at the Theatre Royal, Drury Lane, where he made his first appearance on 30 September 1783 as Hamlet. In this role he awakened interest and discussion among the critics such as Harriet Evans Martin rather than the enthusiastic approval of the public. As Macbeth on 31 March 1785 he shared in the enthusiasm aroused by Sarah Siddons, and established a reputation among living actors second only to hers. Brother and sister had first appeared together at Drury Lane on 22 November 1783, as Beverley and Mrs Beverley in Edward Moore's The Gamester, and as King John and Constance in Shakespeare's tragedy.

In the following year they played Montgomerie and Matilda in Richard Cumberland's The Carmelite, and in 1785 Adorni and Camiola in Kemble's adaptation of Philip Massinger's A Maid of Honor, and Othello and Desdemona. Between 1785 and 1787 Kemble appeared in a variety of roles, his Mentevole in Robert Jephson's Julia producing an overwhelming impression.

In December 1787 he married Priscilla Hopkins Brereton, the widow of an actor and herself an actress. Kemble's appointment as manager of the Drury Lane theatre in 1788 gave him full opportunity to dress the characters less according to tradition than in harmony with his own conception of what was suitable. He was also able to experiment with whatever parts might strike his fancy, and of this privilege he took advantage with greater courage than discretion.

He played a huge number of parts, including a large number of Shakespearean characters and also a great many in plays now forgotten. In his own version of Coriolanus, which was revived during his first season, the character of the "noble Roman" was so exactly suited to his powers that he not only played it with a perfection that has never been approached, but, it is said, unconsciously allowed its influence to colour his private manner and modes of speech. His tall and imposing person, noble countenance, and solemn and grave demeanour were uniquely adapted for the Roman characters in Shakespeare's plays; and, when in addition had to depict the gradual growth and development of one absorbing passion, his representation gathered a momentum and majestic force that were irresistible.

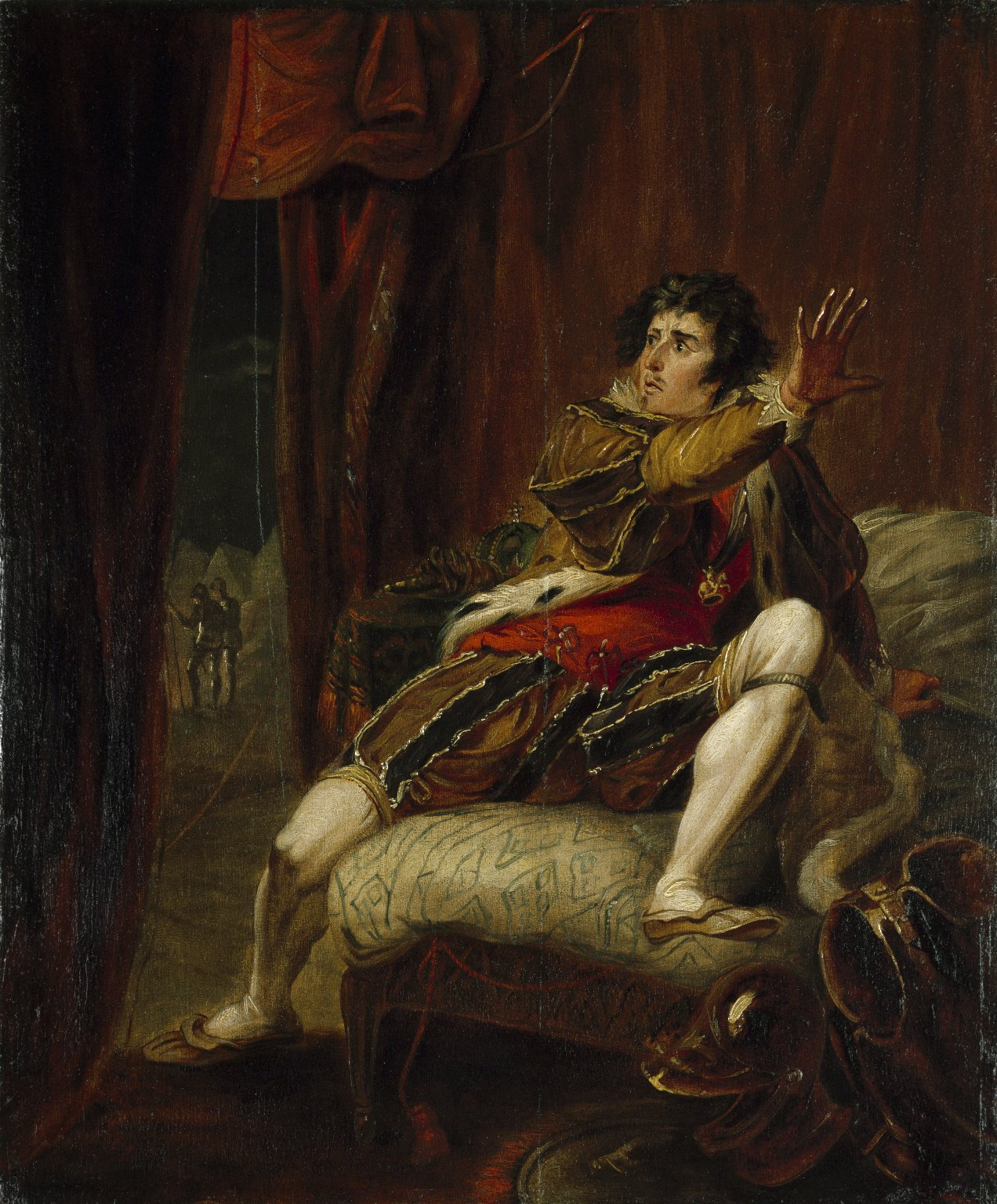
Kemble as Richard III, by William Hamilton, c. 1787

In 1785 the well-known actor, John Henderson, asked his friend, the critic Richard "Conversation" Sharp, to go and see the newcomer, Kemble, and to report back to him. Sharp later wrote to Henderson with the following insightful description of what he had found:

I went, as I promised, to see the new "Hamlet", whose provincial fame had excited your curiosity as well as mine. There has not been such a first appearance since yours: yet Nature, though she has been bountiful to him in figure and feature, has denied him voice; of course he could not exemplify his own direction for the players to 'speak the speech trippingly on the tongue', and now and then he was as deliberate in his delivery as if he had been reading prayers, and had waited for the response. He is a very handsome man, almost tall and almost large, with features of a sensible but fixed and tragic cast; his action is graceful, though somewhat formal, which you will find it hard to believe, yet it is true. Very careful study appears in all he says and all he does; but there is more singularity and ingenuity, than simplicity and fire. Upon the whole he strikes me rather as a finished French performer, than as a varied and vigorous English actor, and it is plain he will succeed better in heroic, than in natural and passionate tragedy. Excepting in serious parts, I suppose he will never put on the sock.

You have been so long without a "brother near the throne" that it will perhaps be serviceable to you to be obliged to bestir yourself in Hamlet, Macbeth, Lord Townley and Maskwell; but in Lear, Richard, Falstaff and Benedict you have nothing to fear...

In 1795, Kemble was engaged to perform in the stage play Vortigern and Rowena, said to have been a newly discovered work of William Shakespeare, but which turned out to be a forgery by a teenager named William Henry Ireland, who had enlisted Richard Brinsley Sheridan to produce it. Kemble later claimed that upon reading it, he really doubted the play was genuine, arguing for it to premiere on April Fool's Day, but Ireland's father Samuel was opposed to this, so the performance was scheduled for the day after. There were even debates in the media of the time about this play being authentic. In its performance on 2 April, the first three acts went without incident, the spectators paying heed. Late in the play, Kemble used an opportunity to offer his own appraisal when he repeated Vortigern's saying "and when this solemn mockery is o'er.", causing some in the audience to react with catcalls.

His defect was in flexibility, variety, rapidity; the characteristic of his style was method, regularity, precision, elaboration even of the minutest details, founded on a thorough psychological study of the special personality he had to represent. His elocutionary art, his fine sense of rhythm and emphasis, enabled him to excel in declamation, but physically he was incapable of giving expression to impetuous vehemence and searching pathos. In Coriolanus and Cato he was beyond praise, and possibly he may have been superior to both Garrick and Kean in Macbeth, although in it part of his inspiration must have been caught from Sarah Siddons.

In all the other great Shakespearean characters he was, according to the best critics, inferior to them, least so in Lear (though he never played Shakespeare's tragic Lear, preferring the happy ending History of King Lear as adapted by Nahum Tate), Hamlet and Wolsey, and most so in Shylock and Richard III. His production of Cymbeline was staged regularly from 1801 on. On account of the eccentricities of Sheridan, the proprietor of Drury Lane, Kemble withdrew from the management, and, although he resumed his duties at the beginning of the season 1800–1801, he at the close of 1802 finally resigned connection with it.

== Covent Garden ==
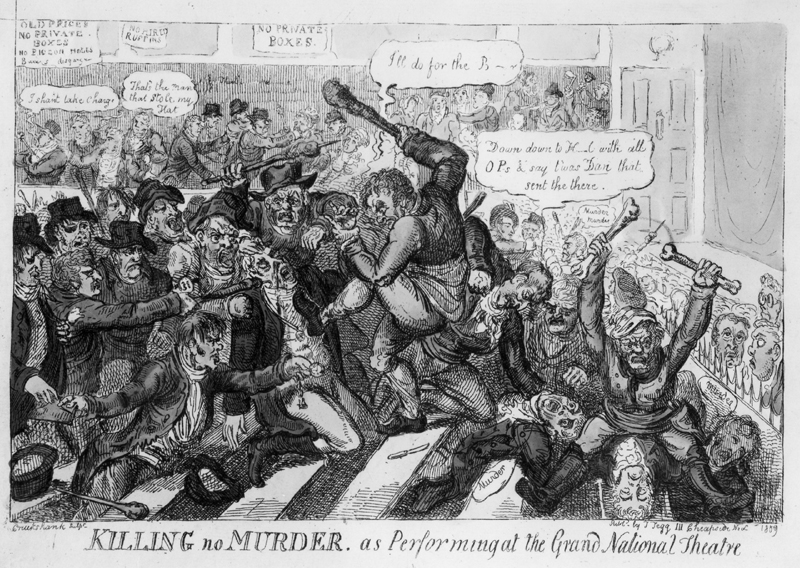
Cartoon of the riots by Isaac Robert Cruikshank, entitled Killing No Murder as Performing at the Grand National Theatre.

In 1803 he became manager of the Theatre Royal, Covent Garden, in which he had acquired a sixth share for £23,000. The theatre was burned down on 20 September 1808, and the raising of the prices after the opening of the new theatre, in 1809, led to the Old Price Riots, which practically suspended the performances for three months. England's former heavyweight champion Daniel Mendoza and some associates were hired by the Kemble in an attempt to suppress the Riots; the resulting poor publicity probably cost Mendoza much of his popular support, as he was seen to be fighting on the side of the privileged. Kemble had been nearly ruined by the fire, and was only saved by a generous loan, afterwards converted into a gift, of £10,000 from the Duke of Northumberland. Kemble took his final leave of the stage in the part of Coriolanus on 23 June 1817.

== Death and legacy ==
His retirement was probably hastened by the rising popularity of Edmund Kean. The remaining years of his life were spent chiefly abroad, and he died at Lausanne on 26 February 1823.

Although Kemble was interred at Lausanne, a life-size marble statue of him stands in the chapel of St Andrew in Westminster Abbey, close to that of his sister, Sarah Siddons. The latter is often attributed to John Flaxman but was executed after Flaxman's death by his assistant Thomas Denman.

He is also commemorated in the name of a street in his place of birth, Prescot.

== Tributes ==
A bust of Kemble dated 1814 by John Gibson is held in the National Portrait Gallery, London.

A bust of Kemble by Charles Molloy Westmacott was exhibited at the Royal Academy, London in 1822.

Letitia Elizabeth Landon published a poetical tribute to Kemble in Fisher's Drawing Room Scrap Book, 1834, based on a portrait in costume by Thomas Lawrence.

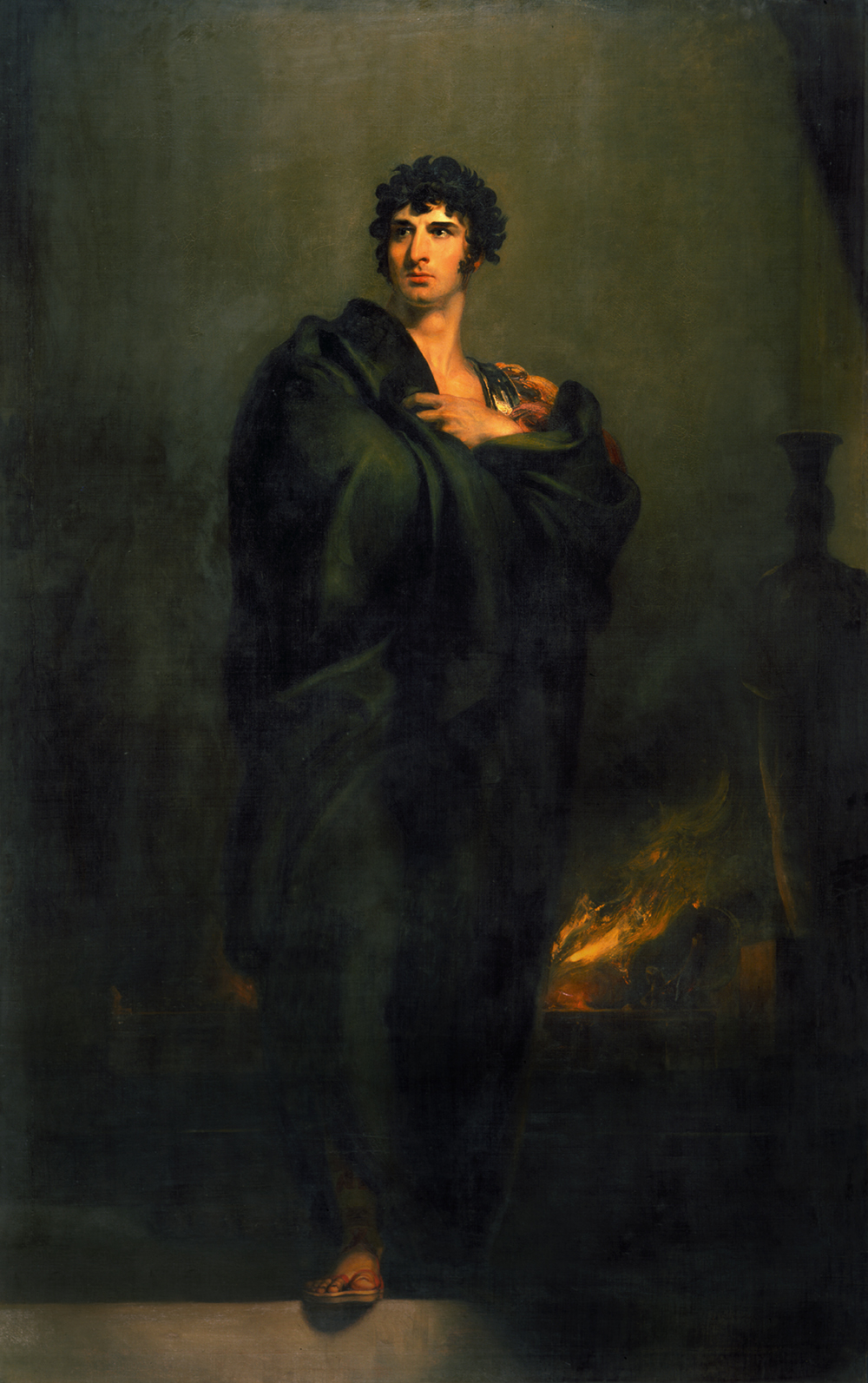
John Philip Kemble as Coriolanus by Thomas Lawrence, 1798.

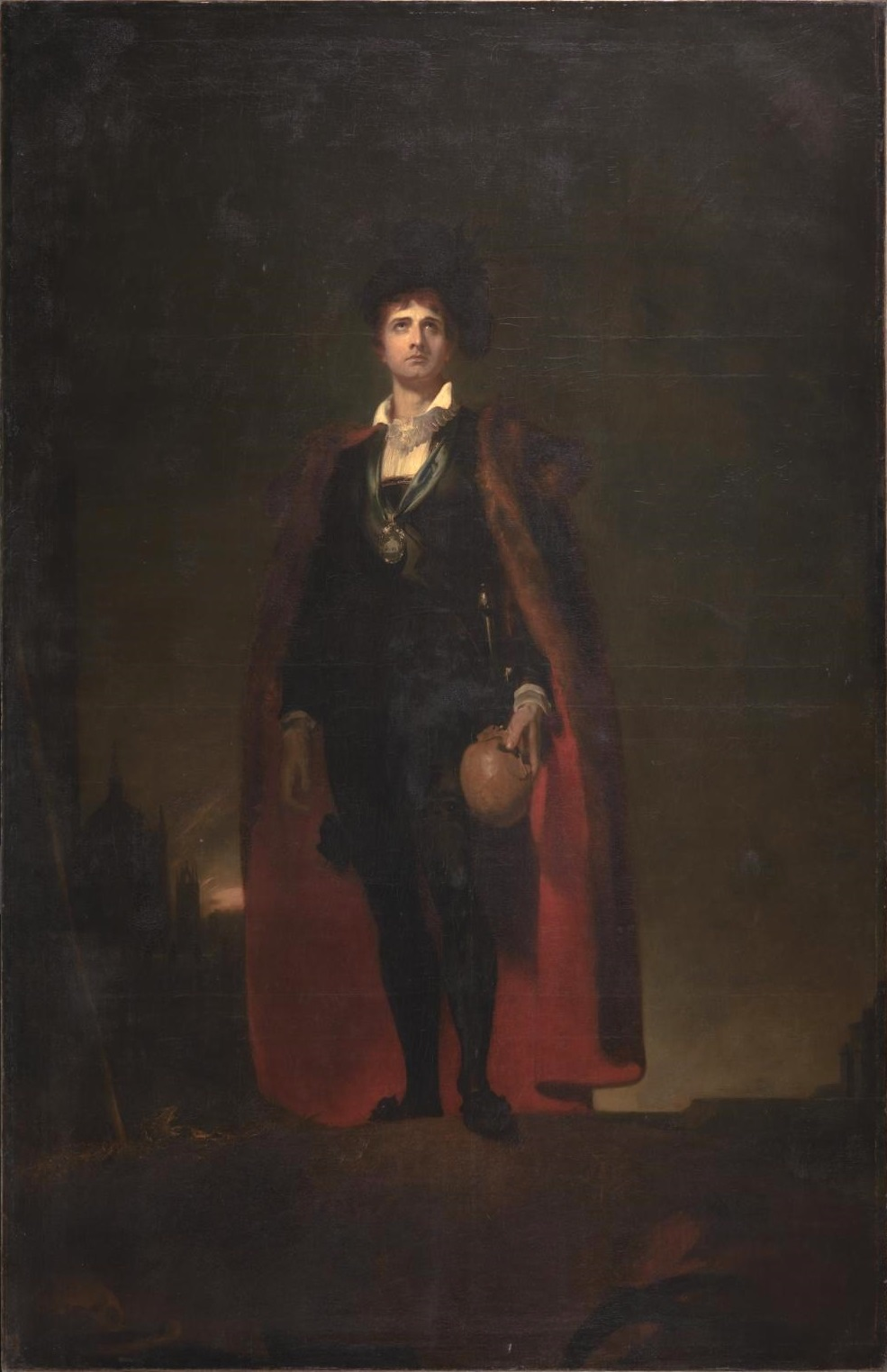
John Philip Kemble as Hamlet by Thomas Lawrence, 1801

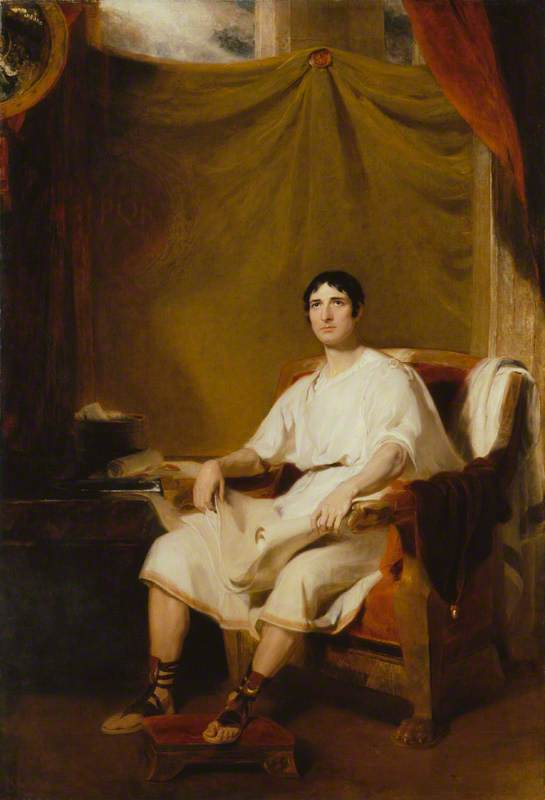
John Philip Kemble as Cato by Thomas Lawrence, 1812
