= Elizabeth Whitlock =

English actress (1761–1836)

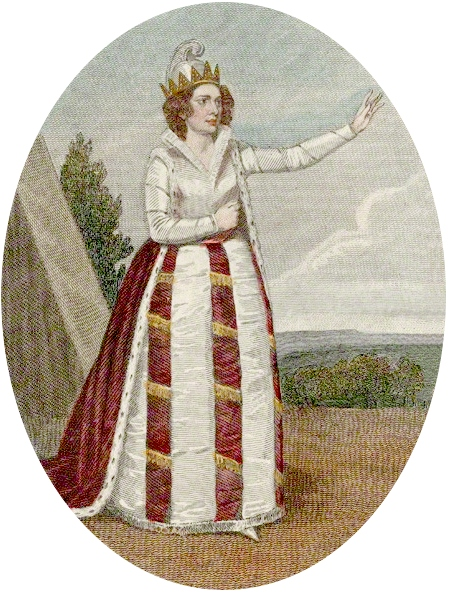
Elizabeth Whitlock, circa 1792

Elizabeth Whitlock (née Kemble; 2 April 1761, Warrington, Lancashire – 27 February 1836, Addlestone) was an English actress, a member of the Kemble family of actors. She made her first appearance on the stage in 1783. In 1785 she married Charles E. Whitlock, went with him to America, and played with much success there. She seems to have retired about 1807. Her sister was actress Sarah Siddons.

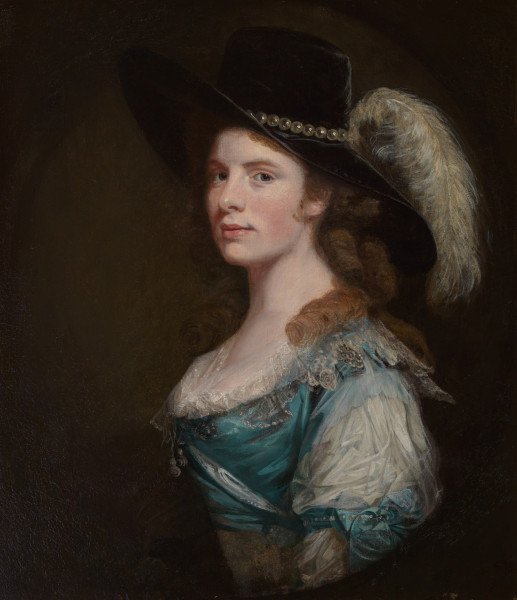
Elizabeth Whitlock by (attributed to) John Downman
