= Henry Stephen Kemble =

British actor

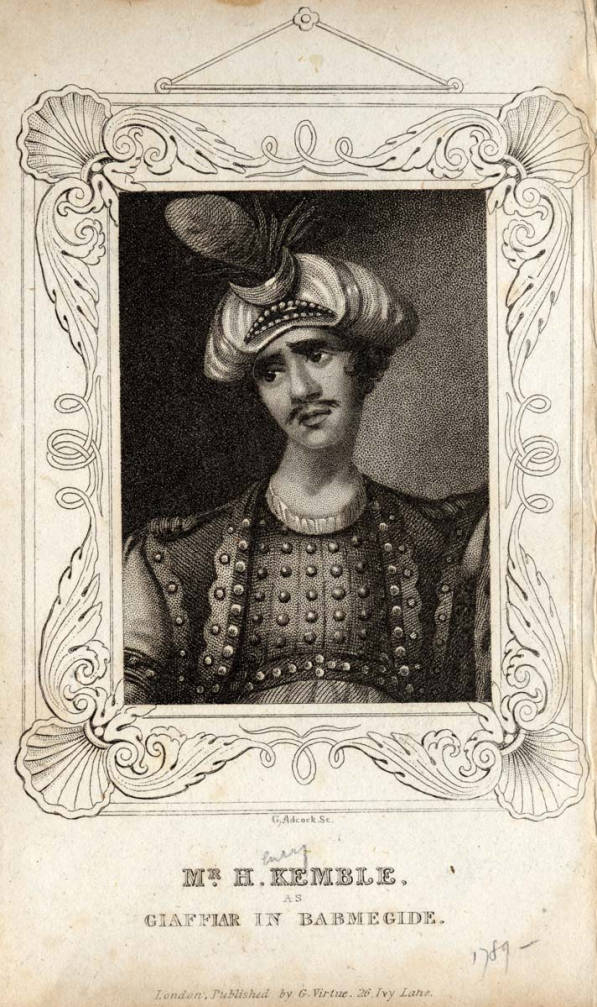
- Kemble as Giafar in Milner's ‘Barmecide, or the Fatal Offspring’
- Born: 15 September 1789; London, England
- Died: 22 June 1836 (aged 46)
- Spouse: Mary Freese (Note: daughter of Nicholas Freese (1762–1831) and Mary Stokes, and brother to Lieutenant George Fraser Freese (1792–1831) of the 59th Regiment of the Foot. He was killed during the Peninsular War in the Battle of Victoria.)
- Parent(s): Stephen Kemble; Elizabeth Satchell
- Relatives: Kemble family

Henry Stephen Kemble (15 September 1789 – 22 June 1836) was a British actor and son of Stephen Kemble and a member of the Kemble family of actors.

Kemble was born in Villiers Street, Strand, London. He was educated at Winchester College and Trinity College, Cambridge, which he quit after two years' residence to try his fortune on the stage, travelling with his father.

During his father's management of Drury Lane (1818–1819), Kemble played several important roles, for which he seemed rather unqualified.

== Notes ==
This article incorporates text from a publication now in the public domain: "Kemble, Henry Stephen". Dictionary of National Biography. London: Smith, Elder & Co. 1885–1900.
