= Roger Kemble =

English theatre manager, strolling player and actor (1721–1802)

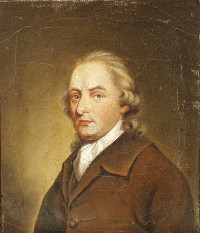
Portrait by Thomas Beach c.1786

Roger Kemble (1 March 1721 – 6 December 1802) was an English theatre manager, strolling player and actor. In 1753, he married Irish actress Sarah "Sally" Ward (1735–1806) at Cirencester in Gloucestershire, and they had thirteen children, who formed the Kemble family of 19th-century actors and actresses.

== Biography ==
Roger Kemble was born in Hereford, a grand-nephew of Fr John Kemble, a recusant priest, who was hanged in that city in 1679. Kemble first entered the theatre by joining Smith's company at Canterbury in 1752. While he was there it was agreed that he would marry Fanny Furnival and although she appeared as "Mrs Kemble" it is thought that they never married. Furnival and Kemble then moved to Birmingham under the management of John Ward, whose daughter Kemble would eventually marry.

Upon Ward's retirement, Roger took on his first management position by taking over the management of the theatre at Leominster in 1766. He formed a traveling theatrical company soon after his marriage to Sarah Ward, and subsequently she and their children toured with the company for the next fifteen years.

Five of Kemble's children and many of his grandchildren became famous actors. The oldest of their twelve children, Sarah Siddons, became the most famous. She first appeared as Ariel in The Tempest with her father's company in Coventry in 1766. In 1767 the actor William Siddons joined the company whom Sarah married in 1773, returning to the stage as Mrs. Siddons.

As primarily a theatre manager, Roger Kemble never became as famous as his children, although he scored a success at London's Haymarket Theatre where in 1788 he appeared as Falstaff in Shakespeare’s Henry IV, Part 1 and in the Miller of Mansfield.

== Legacy ==
There is a plaque commemorating Kemble's Hereford birthplace at 28-29 Church Street and Kemble Road in London's Forest Hill is named after him.
