= Theatre in Birmingham =

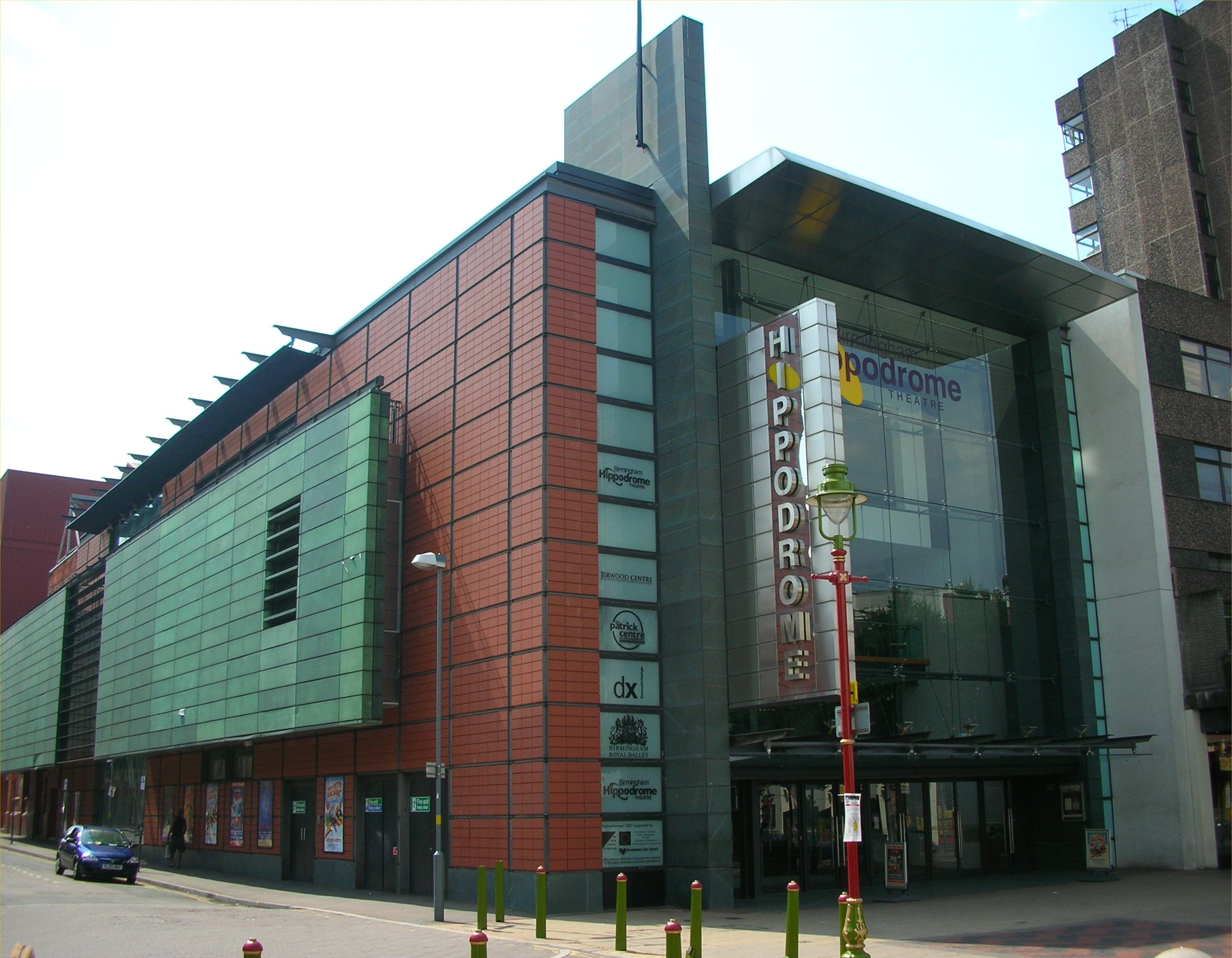
The Birmingham Hippodrome, home stage of the Birmingham Royal Ballet, is the busiest single theatre in the United Kingdom.

Birmingham is an important centre for theatre in the United Kingdom. The earliest known performances in the city were medieval pageants and miracle plays. Birmingham's first permanent theatres and theatrical companies were founded in the 1740s, drawing both actors and performance styles from the fashionable theatres of London. During World War II, the Birmingham Blitz forced all performance venues in the city to close; most would stay closed throughout the war. The postwar introduction of television led to further theatre closures.

Today, Birmingham is home to Four major producing theatres--Birmingham Repertory Theatre, The Crescent Theatre, the Old Rep, and the Blue Orange Theatre—as well as a number of touring venues, the Birmingham Royal Ballet, and the Birmingham Opera Company.

== History ==
=== Early performers and venues ===
What evidence remains of drama in medieval Birmingham suggests that it was largely religious in its basis. The Guild of the Holy Cross was established in the 14th century to maintain chantries in the parish church of St Martin in the Bull Ring, and is likely to have presented liturgical drama at its guildhall on New Street. The street now known as Carr's Lane in Birmingham City Centre was originally called "God's Cart Lane", after the Holy Cart used for religious pageantry and the presentation of morality plays and miracle plays. Wakes were established in Deritend and in Handsworth in the 15th century where booth drama would have been presented.

The earliest definite records of dramatic performances in the town are of regular seasonal performances by strolling players in the early 18th century. A booth existed by 1715 in "The Hinkleys" – the area bounded by Smallbrook Street and Dudley Street near the site of the current Old Rep theatre – and a second, described as a "shed of boards", is recorded a few years later in the meadows that would later be developed as Temple Street. These later developed into the theatre in Smallbrook Street and the Playhouse in New Street, but at this early date would have presented plays and performances by travelling actors of indifferent quality, who carried their costumes and scenery with them on their backs and announced their performances by beating a drum.

A building "something like a stable" in Castle Yard between High Street and Moor Street was used for dramatic performances from 1730. The standard of production in this new venue was reflected in the remarks of William Hutton, writing later in the century: "here the comedian strutted in painted rags, ornamented with tinsel. The audience raised a noisy laugh, half real and half forced, at three-pence a head." Not all of the performances of this era were of such low quality, however: later playbills suggest that George Hallam had visited Birmingham with a company of actors from London, and that a repertoire of good quality was being presented in the town, by 1730 at the latest.

=== Georgian theatre ===
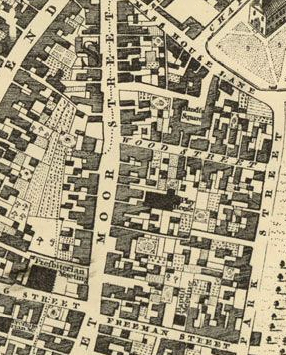
The Moor Street Theatre, marked as the "Play House", on Samuel Bradford's 1751 map of Birmingham

It was in the 1740s that Birmingham emerged as the home of a distinctive theatrical tradition, which had become well-established by 1750. The town's first permanent theatre was the Moor Street Theatre, which opened in 1740. Though not purpose-built, this was a substantial structure with boxes, a pit, a balcony, two galleries, and significant backstage machinery. This new venue brought a major increase in the quality of drama presented in the town. It was managed during the 1740s by John Ward, whose background lay not with provincial strolling players but with London's fashionable Lincoln's Inn Fields Theatre and Theatre Royal, Drury Lane, and with the Aungier Street Theatre in Dublin. The Moor Street Theatre featured notable cast-members – David Garrick himself performed at Moor Street in the 1740s – and presented a credible repertoire: the season for 1744 included Shakespeare's Othello, Julius Caesar and The Tempest, John Vanbrugh's The Provok'd Wife, Fair Rosamund and The Biter Bit, William Congreve's Love for Love and The Mourning Bride, and John Rich's The Spaniard Outwitted. Performances were given in costumes "proper to the play", reflecting the time and culture in which the drama was set, anticipating Garrick's later reforms at Drury Lane in London.

The most notable development of the 1740s was John Ward's founding of the Warwickshire Company of Comedians – Birmingham's first indigenous theatre company. Ward was the manager of the Moor Street Theatre in the 1740s and had established the company by 1744, when it is recorded as playing in Stratford-upon-Avon. At a time when any actor outside London was officially "deemed to be a rogue and a vagabond" the Birmingham company's performances were of much higher standard than was usual outside London. A reviewer of their performance in Stratford on Avon in 1746 described them as "much ye best Set I have seen out of London, & in which opinion I am far from being singular" and the memoirs of the contemporary Irish actor Charles Lee Lewes speak of "the Great Ward" who "has now a very great company at Birmingham: many of them are no less than Londoners". Ward maintained an interest in theatrical affairs in London throughout the 1740s. Many of the actors in his company had experience from London and Dublin and the company's repertoire included works by Congreve, Dryden, Lee, Rowe, Shakespeare, Steele, and Vanbrugh, as well as more populist fare including pantomime, music and dance.

Developments in Birmingham's theatrical culture were not confined just to the new theatre. The Playhouse in New Street and the Theatre in Smallbrook Street – successors to booths recorded earlier in the century – continued to operate through the 1740s, though both had disappeared by 1751. Serious plays co-existed with more vulgar entertainments at all Birmingham's theatres – from musical concerts to fire-eating, rope-dancing to ventriloquism – often at the same venue, sometimes even on the same evening. Popular dramatic entertainment much like later music hall was also often held in the town's larger public houses, including the "George and Dragon" and the "Red Lion" in the Bull Ring, the "King's Head" in Digbeth and the "Roe Buck" in Cox Street. Though popular these were illegal and often prosecuted by the owners of the more established theatres, who viewed them as unwelcome competition.

The Licensing Act 1737 confined drama in England to the two London patent theatres, otherwise forbidding "every Person who shall for Hire, Gain or Reward, act, represent or perform, any Interlude, Tragedy, Comedy, Opera, Play, Farce, or other entertainment of the stage" To get round this all Birmingham theatrical venues were licensed by magistrates for the performances of "Concerts of Music" under the Disorderly Houses Act 1732, with plays technically being given free of charge during the interval. Such licenses were only available for 60 day periods between June and October, however, as a result of which Birmingham theatres had only summer seasons until the licensing of the Theatre Royal in 1807.

=== Twentieth century theatre ===
By 1901 Birmingham had ten theatres. The Tivoli (later the Hippodrome) and the Lyceum (later the Alexandra Theatre) showed melodrama, pantomime, circus and variety acts. The Theatre Royal and the Prince of Wales, which had closed their stock companies, received touring modern and classical drama from leading national actor-managers.

=== Post-war theatre ===
The outbreak of the Second World War saw the enforced closure of all Birmingham's theatres in anticipation of immediate bombing. Although they were allowed to reopen after a few weeks, the onset of the Birmingham Blitz in 1940 led to a collapse in attendance at evening performances and the return of closure for the majority of theatres. The Birmingham Repertory Theatre was closed for two years from December 1940, and only the Alexandra Theatre would stay open for the entire remaining duration of the war. The most notable theatrical development of the war years were the Plays in the Park, that saw Birmingham's theatre companies working around the threat of evening bombing of the city centre by presenting matinée performances of drama in the city's parks.

The opening of the Sutton Coldfield transmitting station in 1949 made Birmingham the first British city outside London to have a television service, and this came to have a severe effect on the city's commercial theatres. Moss Empires closed the Theatre Royal in 1958, with the replacement proposed as part of the ATV Centre never materialising. The Alexandra Theatre was suffering financial problems by 1956, being forced to seek a loan from Birmingham City Council in 1963 and from the Arts Council in 1968. In October 1968 it was bought by the City Council and leased to a non- profit making management trust. The Alex's repertory company was closed in 1974 and the company continued as a receiving house. Moss Empires threatened to close the Hippodrome in 1961 and 1970, but in 1979 sold it to the City Council who in turn leased it to a charitable trust. The Hippodrome's fortunes gradually revived, and by the early 21st century it was selling more tickets than any other single theatre in the country. By the 1980s Birmingham had only three large-scale professional theatres, though this was still – jointly with Manchester – the highest number of any English city outside London.

During the 70s, MAC, then known as the Midlands Arts Centre for Young People had its own professional puppet theatre and resident theatre company, members of the theatre company included Mike Leigh, Brian Blessed and Sir Tony Robinson.

== Contemporary theatre ==
=== Drama ===
==== Producing theatres ====
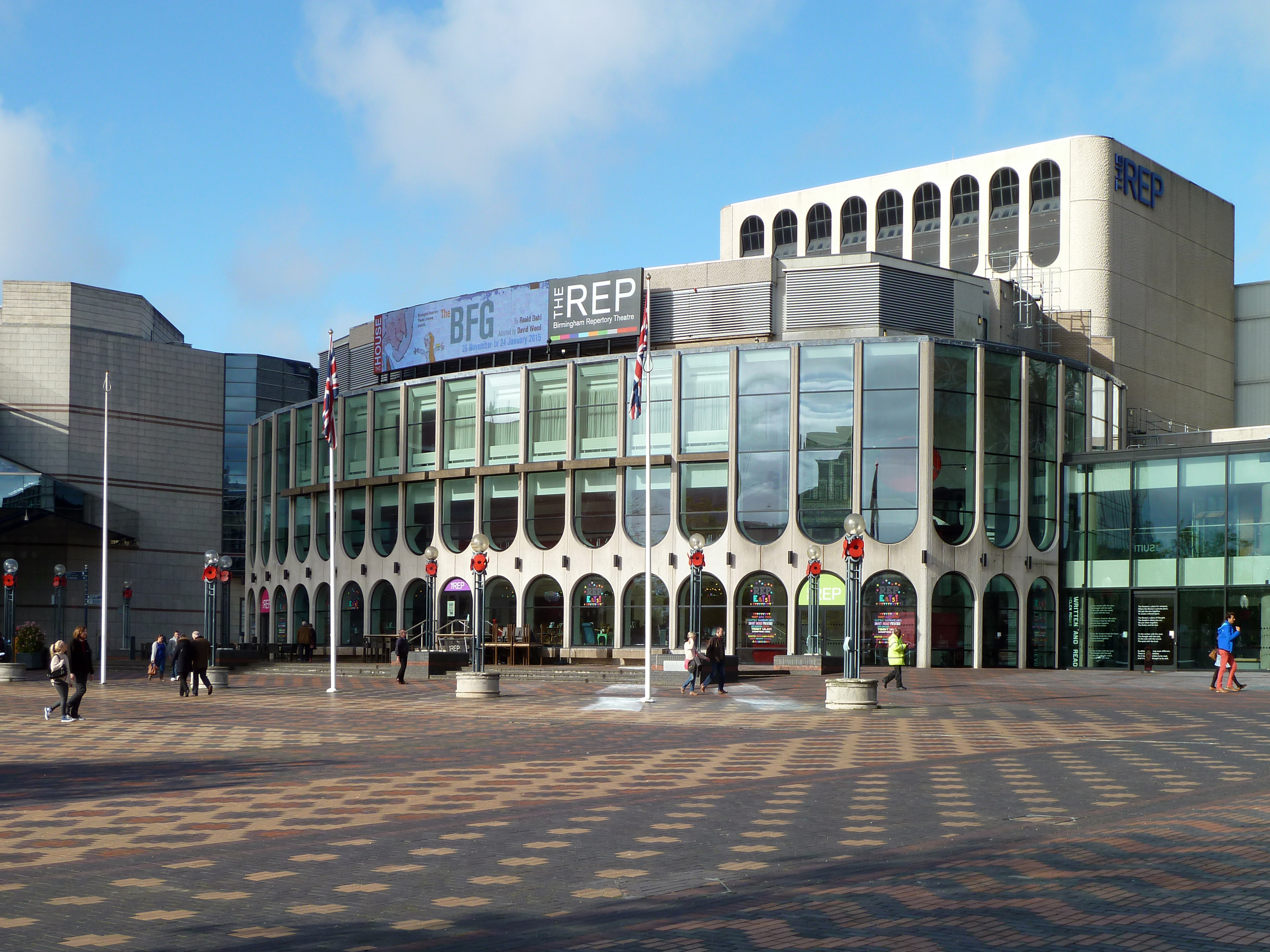
Birmingham Repertory Theatre

Birmingham Repertory Theatre, commonly known as "The Rep" and located next to the Library of Birmingham on Centenary Square, is one of Britain's leading producing theatres. It stages a wide range of performances in its three auditoria in Birmingham – The House with 825 seats, The Studio with 300 seats and The Door with 140 seats – as well as touring nationally and internationally and transferring productions to London's West End. The Rep regularly commissions new work and presented over 130 new plays during the five-year period to 2013.

The Crescent Theatre is a Repertory Theatre that is part of the Brindleyplace development located on Sheepcote St. With a membership pool of 200+ members, a board of directors and an Arts team, the Crescent produces annual seasons produced by The Crescent Theatre Company. The 12+ show seasons are produced by its volunteer base in its entirety using the theatres extensive costume store, Props department and set design workshop. The Crescent Theatre recently celebrated its Centenary season in 2023/2024 by revisiting a number of previously produced shows.

The Birmingham Stage Company is the resident company at the 383 seat Old Rep in Station Street, where it performs 5 major productions annually before touring them as far afield as Singapore, Dubai, New York City and Sydney. Founded in 1992, it has focused on new and contemporary plays since 1998, producing world premieres by playwrights including Oren Lavie, Paul Lucas, Dominic Leyton, David Mamet and Reg Cribb.

The Blue Orange Theatre is a small fringe theatre based in the Jewellery Quarter, with a flexible theatre space seating between 90 and 100 people. Although primarily a producing theatre it also hosts visiting companies and runs comedy nights, workshops and courses.

==== Touring venues and companies ====
The Alexandra Theatre and the Birmingham Hippodrome host large-scale touring productions, while professional drama is performed on a wide range of stages across the city, including the Old Rep, the Crescent Theatre, the Custard Factory, the Old Joint Stock Theatre, the Blue Orange Theatre and the mac in Cannon Hill Park.During the 70s, mac, then known as the Midlands Arts Centre for Young People had its own professional puppet theatre and resident theatre company, members of the theatre company included Mike Leigh, Brian Blessed and Sir Tony Robinson.

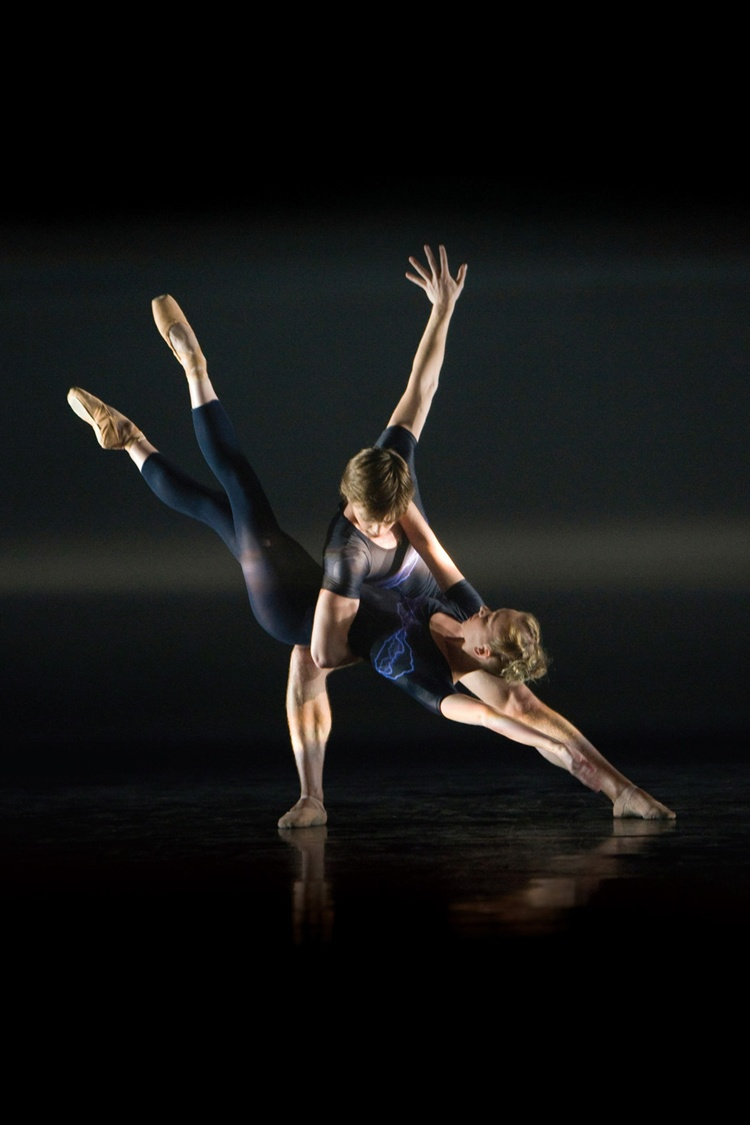
Birmingham Royal Ballet performing in Tokyo in 2011

Touring theatre companies in Birmingham include the experimental Stan's Cafe, the politically radical Banner Theatre, the Birmingham Stage Company and the Maverick Theatre Company.

=== Dance ===
The Birmingham Royal Ballet is one of the United Kingdom's three major ballet companies and the only one based outside London. It is resident at the Birmingham Hippodrome and tours extensively nationally and internationally. The company's associated ballet school – Elmhurst School for Dance in Edgbaston – is the oldest vocational dance school in the country.

=== Opera ===
The Birmingham Opera Company under artistic director Graham Vick has developed an international reputation for its avant-garde productions, which often take place in factories, abandoned buildings and other found spaces around the city. In 2010 it was described by The Guardian as "far and away the most powerful example that I've experienced in this country of how and why opera can still matter." More conventional seasons by Welsh National Opera and other visiting opera companies take place regularly at the Birmingham Hippodrome.

== Bibliography and further reading ==
- Cochrane, Claire (2006), "Birmingham", in Chambers, Colin (ed.), The Continuum Companion to Twentieth Century Theatre, New York: Continuum International Publishing Group, p. 91, ISBN 1847140017
- Crompton Rhodes, R . (1924), The Theatre Royal, Birmingham, 1774-1924: a short history, Birmingham: Moody Brothers, OCLC 10940797
- Cunningham, John E. (1950), Theatre Royal: the history of the Theatre Royal, Birmingham, Oxford: George Ronald, OCLC 2858220
- McManaway, James G. (1949), "The Two Earliest Prompt Books of "Hamlet"", The Papers of the Bibliographical Society of America, 43 (3): 288–320, doi:10.1086/pbsa.43.3.24298457, ISSN 0006-128X
- Money, John (1977), Experience and identity: Birmingham and the West Midlands, 1760-1800, Manchester University Press, ISBN 0719006724
- Pendleton, Muriel (2010), From bullbaiting to theater and oratorio attending: The cultural development of Birmingham during the eighteenth century, Long Beach, California: California State University
- Price, Victor J. (1988), Birmingham Theatres, Concert and Music Halls, Studley: Brewin Books, ISBN 0947731350
- Salberg, Derek (1980), Ring down the curtain: a fascinating record of Birmingham theatres and contemporary life through three centuries, Luton: Cortney Publications, ISBN 090437808X
- Salberg, Derek (1983), "Birmingham at play", A Mixed Bag, Luton: Cortney Publications, pp. 104–136, ISBN 0904378225
- Stephens, W. B. (1964), "Social History before 1815", in Stephens, W.B. (ed.), The City of Birmingham, The Victoria History Of The County Of Warwick, vol. VII, Oxford: Oxford University Press, pp. 209–222
- Thompson, Ann (1999), "'I'll have grounds / More relative than this': The Puzzle of John Ward's 'Hamlet' Promptbooks", The Yearbook of English Studies, 29: 138–150, doi:10.2307/3508939, ISSN 0306-2473, JSTOR 3508939
