= John Alcock =

John Alcock may refer to:

- John Alcock (bishop) (c. 1430–1500), English churchman
- John Alcock (priest), Dean of Ferns, 1747–1769
- John Alcock (organist) (1715–1806), English organist and composer
- John Alcock (Archdeacon of Raphoe) (1733–1817), Irish Anglican priest
- John Alcock (organist, born 1740) (1740–1791), English organist and composer. Son of John Alcock (1715–1806)
- John Forster Alcock (1841–1910), English sportsman and football organiser
- John Alcock (Archdeacon of Waterford) (1804–1886)
- John Alcock (RAF officer) (1892–1919), British Royal Air Force officer. First non-stop transatlantic flight
- John Alcock (behavioral ecologist) (1942–2023), American author, professor at Arizona State University
