= Cello Concerto No. 2 (Haydn) =

Cello concerto by Joseph Haydn

Cello Concerto
- No. 2
- Cello concerto by Joseph Haydn
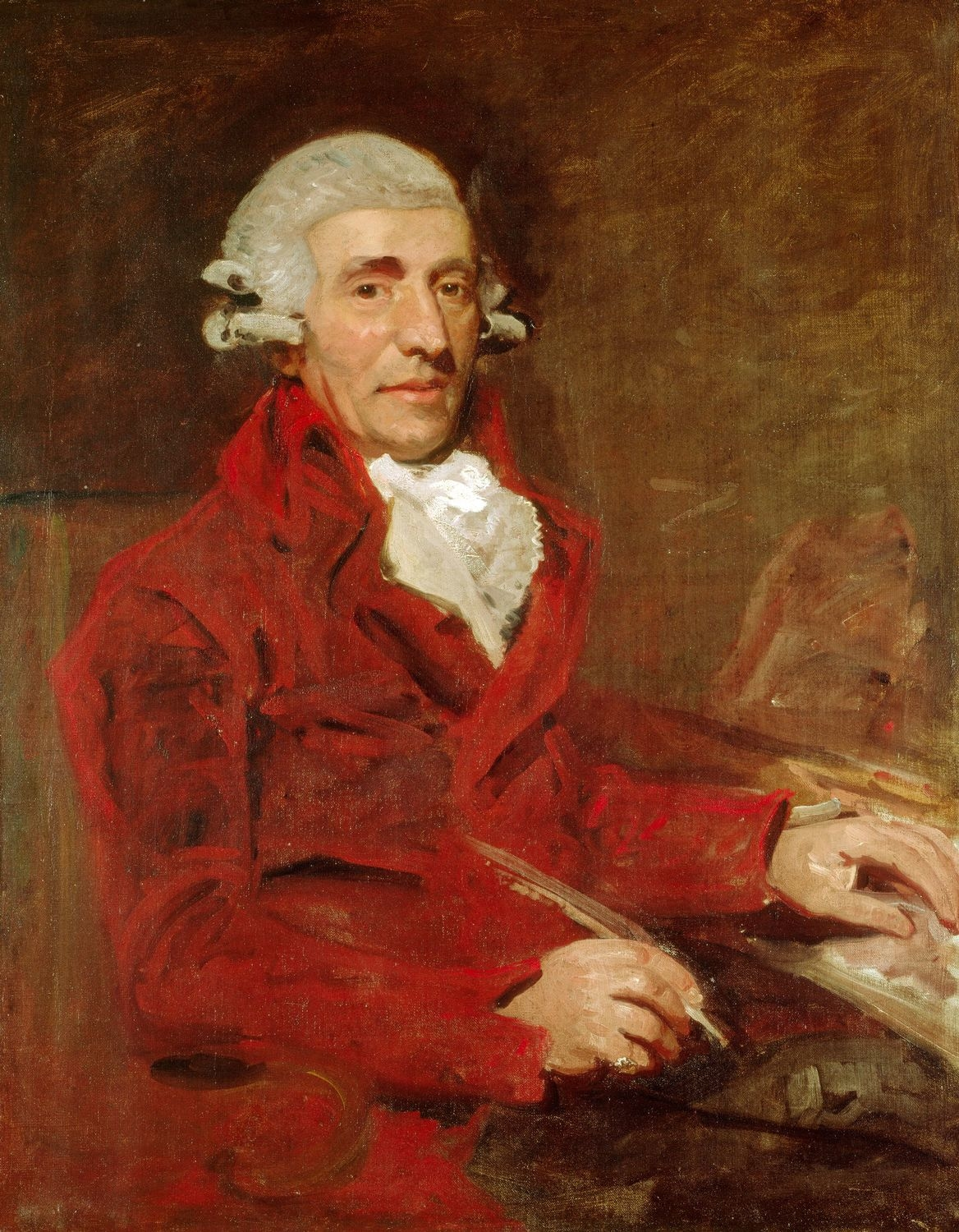
- Haydn c. 1791
- Key: D major
- Catalogue: Hob. VIIb/2
- Composed: 1783
- Performed: 14 March 1784 Hannover Square, London
- Movements: 3

Joseph Haydn's Cello Concerto No. 2 in D Major, Hob. VIIb/2, Op. 101, was for many years thought to have been composed in 1783 for Antonín Kraft, a cellist of Prince Nikolaus's Esterházy orchestra.

New research, published in 2019 by Thomas Tolley and building on discoveries of Simon McVeigh, shows it was neither written for nor debuted by Kraft, an assertion that had been made by Kraft's son to musicologist Gustav Schilling, and later repeated in Schilling's influential musical encyclopedias.

However, original advertisements in the London press announced that ‘A new Concerto, Violoncello, Mr Cervetto, composed by Haydn’ had its premier on March 24, 1784 at Hannover Square. A second performance was advertised a week later as being a ‘Concerto Violoncello, Mr Cervetto, composed by Haydn’. The C major concerto, Haydn's only other cello concerto, was, at this point, more than twenty years old. The soloist of the premiere, James Cervetto (son of noted cellist Jacob Cervetto), was the principal cellist of the Italian Opera in London and one of England’s leading solo cellists. It is regarded as one of the greatest works for cello of the classical era.

The piece's authenticity was doubted for some time, and at one stage it was suggested that Kraft himself had written it, but most experts now believe that the work is indeed authentic after Haydn's autograph score was discovered in 1951.

== Music ==
I. Allegro moderato

III. Rondo allegro
Cellist John Michel

The concerto is structured in the usual three movements:

1. Allegro moderato
2. Adagio
3. Rondo (Allegro)

In the first movement of the D Major Concerto, the tone is leisurely and soothing. However, the piece soon enters the development phase, where another theme, building upon the opening theme, is discovered. Finally, the recapitulation returns to the main theme.

In the second movement, the key shifts to the dominant, A major. The tempo marking is "Adagio", slower than many of Haydn's slow movements which are marked "Andante". In the middle of the second movement, there is an episode in the rather distant key C major.

The final movement is the shortest movement of the concerto. It is in rondo form, featuring an episode in the dominant key of A major and a more somber digression in D minor. The work ends with a rather cheerful affirmation, less overtly virtuosic than Haydn's First Cello Concerto.
