= William Hynes =

William Hynes may refer to:

- William Joseph Hynes, American newspaperman, lawyer, and politician
- William Hynes (rugby union), English international rugby union player
- Bill Hynes, American racing driver and entrepreneur
- Red Hynes, anti-communist and anti-labor American police officer

== See also ==
- William Hines (disambiguation)
