= Sawyer's Assembly Rooms =

Sawyer's Assembly Rooms in Old Square, Birmingham were the leading assembly rooms in Birmingham during the early period of the Midlands Enlightenment.

The room was opened by William Sawyer in 1740, taking over a property that had previously been used as a school. Before this the town's principal assembly rooms had been at the Hart's Head in Bull Street, which had served this purpose since 1649.

Assemblies were held weekly at Sawyer's and included dancing, conversation and games of cards. Regular subscription concert series were also given at Sawyer's from the 1740s by Barnabas Gunn and John Eversman often being followed by a ball.

The reputation of Sawyer's room as a fashionable venue never recovered from the visit of the Duke of York in 1765, when he remarked that "a town of such magnitude as Birmingham, and adorned with so much beauty, deserved a superior accommodation, that the room itself was mean, but the entrance still meaner" As a result of this insult, new assembly rooms were built at the Royal Hotel in Temple Row, funded by subscription and opening in 1772. Despite this, Sawyer's room continued under Sawyer's own ownership until 1779 when it was taken over by James Cresshull, who operated it for a further 75 years.
