= William Hines =

William Hines may refer to:

- Bill Hines (1922–2016), American custom car builder
- William Hines (journalist) (1916–2005), American journalist
- William Hines Furbush (c. 1839–1902), American politician
- William Henry Hines (1856–1914), American politician
- Willie Hines (1880–1959), Australian rules footballer

== See also ==
- William Hynes (disambiguation)
- William Hine (1687–1730), English organist and composer
