= Richard Hobbs (organist) =

English organist

Richard Hobbs B.M. (c. 1726 – 23 June 1810) was an English organist.

He was born around 1726, the son of Thomas Hobbs (1710-1810) and Mary Matthews. Until 1753 he was organist of St Martin’s Church, Leicester when he was appointed to St Martin in the Bull Ring, Birmingham, in the place of Barnabas Gunn a position he held until 1771. He introduced Oratorio performances in Birmingham with the first taking place in the New Theatre on 10 October 1759 with a performance of William Boyce’s Solomon.

He died in Birmingham on 23 June 1810.

== Appointments ==
- Organist of St Martin’s Church, Leicester ????–1753
- Organist of St Martin in the Bull Ring, Birmingham 1753–1771

Cultural offices
Unknown	Organist of St Martin’s Church, Leicester ????-1753	Succeeded by William Boulton?
Preceded by Barnabas Gunn	Organist of St Martin in the Bull Ring; 1753-1771	Succeeded by Joseph Harris
