= Warwickshire Company of Comedians =

The Warwickshire Company of Comedians, also known as Mr Ward's Company of Comedians and after 1767 as Mr Kemble's Company of Comedians, was a theatre company established by John Ward in Birmingham, England in the 1740s, touring throughout the West Midlands region and surrounding counties over subsequent decades. Unusual in the 18th century as a provincial company producing performances to London tastes and standards, it is particularly notable as the origin of the Kemble family theatrical dynasty, which was to dominate the English stage in the late-18th and early 19th centuries. Sarah Siddons and John Philip Kemble in particular, who were Ward's grandchildren and whose careers began in the company, were the leading actress and actor of their time, and are still considered among the greatest performers in English theatrical history.

== History ==
=== Foundation ===
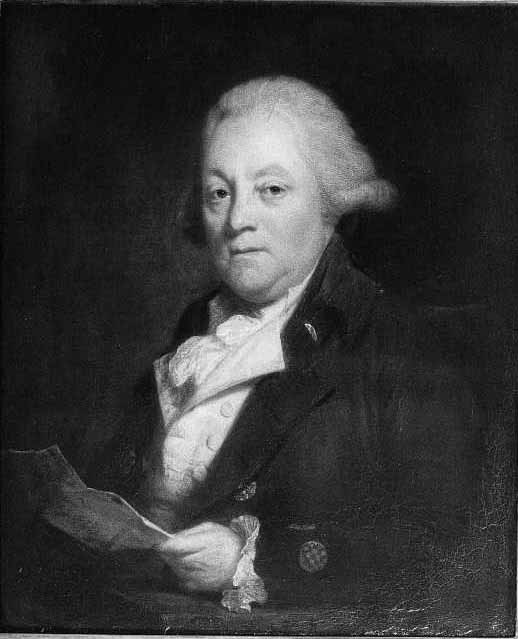
John Ward

The Warwickshire Company of Comedians was founded by John Ward at Birmingham's Moor Street Theatre, which opened in 1740 and which Ward is recorded as managing in the early 1740s. Although the precise date of its foundation is unknown, the company was definitely in existence by 1744, when they are recorded as visiting Stratford-upon-Avon. Their burgeoning reputation was apparent by the time of their next visit in May 1746, when a surviving letter from a local schoolmaster described them as "a Company of Strolling-Players ... much ye best Set I have seen out of London, & in which opinion I am far from being singular". The company returned to Stratford again later that year, when their performance of Othello on 9 September – raising money to restore the memorial bust of Shakespeare in Holy Trinity Church – was the earliest recorded performance of a play by Shakespeare in the playwright's home town.

Over the following decades the company toured widely, performing in town halls, barns, schoolhouses and guildhalls throughout the English Midlands and Wales. Their reputation was such that they were able to play long seasons at each venue – 23 weeks at Ludlow in 1758 and seventeen weeks at Brecon in 1764 – and their repertoire was wide: as well as Shakespeare it included works by Congreve, Dryden, Rowe, Lee, Steele and Vanbrugh, and extended to pantomime, music and dance. Their performances also had a keen sense of spectacle: in Hereford in 1753 they presented Romeo and Juliet with the "Grand Funeral Procession and Solemn Dirge set to Music by Signor Pasqualli", and at Gloucester in 1747 they performed Henry VIII "with the whole ceremony of the coronation of Queen Anne Bullen and the military ceremony of the Champion (on horse-back) in Westminster Hall. The Robes, Armour, Canopy and Bishops' and Judges' dresses and all the decorations of the play entirely new".

=== Kemble ===
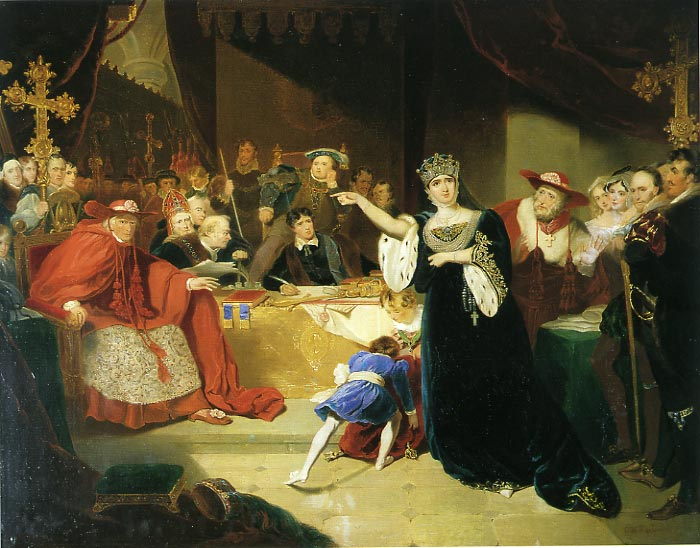
The Court for the Trial of Queen Katharine by George Henry Harlow. Members of the Kemble family, including Sarah Siddons and John Philip Kemble, performing at the Theatre Royal, Covent Garden in 1806

The major turning point in the company's existence took place in 1751 when Richard Yates' company from London's Theatre Royal, Drury Lane opened the purpose-built King Street Theatre in Birmingham to compete with the smaller venue in Moor Street. Ward's reaction to this invasion of his long-held territory was ill-tempered – the contemporary actor Charles Lee Lewes records him describing the newcomers as "drawling, face-making puppies" and promising to "work the dogs a penn'orth for daring to cross my circuit" – and Ward responded by advertising in the London newspapers for "capital performers" to join him in Birmingham. This was pivotal moment in theatrical history, as it was this advertisement that brought Roger Kemble to Birmingham to join the company, and the following June in Cirencester Kemble married the Wards' daughter Sarah. Of the couple's twelve children each that survived into adulthood went onto the stage, all except one married performers, and all were to start their careers performing with the Warwickshire Company of Comedians: this marked the origin of the Kemble family, who were to dominate the English stage over the following decades.

Several sources relate the Wards' anger at their daughter Sarah's elopement: she was not yet 16 and although a "main prop" of her father's in the "comic province", they felt that "an actor's existence was the last into which they wished her to drift". The Kembles were readmitted into the company, however, with Ward justifying his "sullen forgiveness" in the light of his low opinion of his new son-in-law's talents, telling his daughter "I forbade you to marry an actor. You have not disobeyed me since the man you have married neither is nor ever can be an actor". Although the Kembles left the company and toured independently between 1761 and 1763, the Wards retired to Leominster in 1766 and Roger Kemble took over its management on 24 May of that year. By the time the company appeared at Worcester in 1767 they were described as "Mr Kemble's Company of Comedians", with the cast featuring the Kembles' 14-year-old daughter Sarah – the future Sarah Siddons – and their 12-year-old son John Philip Kemble.

Kemble retired in 1781 and the company's stock and goodwill was split between two of the company's members: John Boles Watson, who formed the "Cheltenham Company of Comedians" and established it as the resident company at his newly built Cheltenham Playhouse, and Henry Masterman.

== Reputation and legacy ==
The growth of the reputation of the Warwickshire Company of Comedians marked the birth of Birmingham's theatrical tradition, which was well established by 1750, and further extended this influence to the surrounding counties – they "made the temporary theatre in barn, hall or inn the centre of polite provincial life and brought London tastes and diversions to the country towns".

Under Ward the company's performances were of a much higher standard than that typical of strolling players, being more comparable to those of the major London companies, with whom Ward and several of his company had considerable experience and with whose development they maintained a lively interest. The high regard in which the company was held was recorded by the contemporary actor Charles Lee Lewes, whose memoirs describe the "Great Ward" and his "very great company at Birmingham: many of them are no less than Londoners". Thomas Holcroft, who acted with the company in the 1770s, recalled that in Kemble's time too it was "more respectable than many other companies of strolling players".

The principle importance of the company, however, lies in its role in the genesis of the Kemble family, who were generally thought to have received their beauty and talent from the Wards and whose emergence saw actors with provincial origins for the first time leading rather than following the London stage. Annotations from Ward's surviving prompt books show that he was familiar with early texts of Shakespeare's works and was restoring Shakespeare's original text at an earlier date and more comprehensively even than David Garrick, and also suggest that changes to the staging of Hamlet introduced to London as innovations by John Phillip Kemble had been practiced by Ward's company as early as 1740. While tradition has it that Sarah Siddons "learnt her trade" between her initial unsuccessful appearance at Drury Lane in 1775 and her triumphant return in 1782, it is equally possible that it was popular taste in London that had caught up in the meantime with her style, which was more suited to the emerging romanticism than the existing fashionable neoclassicism.

== Bibliography ==
- Highfill, Philip H.; Burnim, Kalman A.; Langhans, Edward A. (1982), "Kemble, Roger 1722-1802, actor, manager", A Biographical Dictionary of Actors, Actresses, Musicians, Dancers, Managers & Other Stage Personnel in London, 1660-1800, vol. 8, Carbondale: Southern Illinois University Press, pp. 387–394, ISBN 0-585-03152-5
- Highfill, Philip H.; Burnim, Kalman A.; Langhans, Edward A. (1993), "Ward, John 1704-1773, actor, manager, singer", A Biographical Dictionary of Actors, Actresses, Musicians, Dancers, Managers & Other Stage Personnel in London, 1660-1800, vol. 15, Carbondale: Southern Illinois University Press, pp. 258–262, ISBN 0-8093-1802-4
- McManaway, James G. (1949), "The Two Earliest Prompt Books of "Hamlet"", Bibliographical Society of America, Papers, 43 (3): 288–320, doi:10.1086/pbsa.43.3.24298457, S2CID 191382085
- Price, Cecil (1948), The English theatre in Wales in the eighteenth and early nineteenth centuries, Cardiff: University of Wales Press, OCLC 2144525
- Thompson, Ann (1999), "'I'll have grounds / More relative than this': The Puzzle of John Ward's 'Hamlet' Promptbooks", The Yearbook of English Studies, 29: 138–150, doi:10.2307/3508939, JSTOR 3508939
- Thomson, Peter (2004), "Kemble, Roger (1722–1802), actor and theatre manager", Oxford Dictionary of National Biography (Online ed.), Oxford University Press
