= Michael Broome =

Michael Rowland Broome (20 January 1927-29 June 1997) was a numismatist specializing in Islamic coins, and founder of the Oriental Numismatic Society in 1970. His collection of over 3,500 Islamic coins is now in the Fitzwilliam Museum, Cambridge.

== Biography ==
Born in London, Broome attended Dartford Grammar School. He trained as a civil engineering at Woolwich Polytechnic, then Imperial College, then worked at Cotterill's, and G. Percy Trentham, working on factories, roads and airfields, until he left in 1970. He joined the Civil Service, working in the Department of Transport until his retirement in 1990, when he became a consultant and lecturer in Environmental Audit. He married in 1956 and had two children. His daughter Jenny Broome is a professional harpist.

A member of the Royal Numismatic Society, and a founder member of the Reading Coin Club in 1964, Broome was keen to develop and expand the field of oriental and Islamic numismatics, and in 1970 started the Oriental Numismatic Society, remaining as Secretary-General until his death. His book A Handbook of Islamic Coins (1985) won the Royal Numismatic Society's Lhotka Prize. He was a world expert on the coins of the Seljuqs of Rum, and his work on these coins was published posthumously as A Survey of the Coinage of the Seljuqs of Rum (ed. by Vlastimil Novak), and published by the Royal Numismatic Society in 2011.

The Michael Broome collection of coins of Maria Theresa was sold at Baldwin's, London on 5 March 2000. The Michael Broome collection of Islamic coins are in the collection of the Fitzwilliam Museum, Cambridge.

Broome's contribution to numismatics continues to be recognised by three numismatic societies:

The Michael Broome Memorial Fund was established with donations from Broome's family and friends, at the Royal Numismatic Society, with the support of the Oriental Numismatic Society, to be used for numismatic research activity in the areas he was interested in. It is used for research not otherwise covered by the other dedicated RNS funds.

The Michael Broome Memorial Lecture takes place annually, when the Oriental Numimatic Society invites a specialist in oriental numismatics to address the Society. Speakers have included:

- 2002 – Stan Goron, Oriental Numismatic Society
- 2016 – Joe Cribb, British Museum
- 2018 – Richard Morel, British Library
- 2022 - Nikolaus Schindel, Austrian Academy of Sciences
- 2023 – Joe Cribb, Hebei Normal University
- 2024 - Sebastian Hanstein, Research Center for Islamic Numismatics, Tübingen
- 2025 – Sutapa Sinha, University of Calcutta

The Michael Broome Memorial Trophy is awarded annually by the Reading Coin Club.

== Selected Publications ==
Broome published many articles and book reviews in the Journal of the Oriental Numismatic Society.

- 1984 A Forentine Restrike Taler. Museum Notes (American Numismatic Society) 29, 185–189. http://www.jstor.org/stable/43573684
- 1985 A Handbook of Islamic Coins (London: Seaby)
- 1997 Countermarked Islamic Gold Coins in Venetian Cyprus. Numismatic Chronicle 157, 205–209. http://www.jstor.org/stable/42668742
- 2011 A Survey of the Coinage of the Seljuqs of Rum (London: Royal Numismatic Society (posthumous, ed. by Vlastimil Novak)

== See also ==
- Sultanate of Rum
- Maria Theresa thaler
- List of numismatic associations
- List of numismatic journals
