= Birmingham Musical and Amicable Society =

The Birmingham Musical and Amicable Society was a musical society formed by James Kempson and Michael Broome in 1762 in Birmingham, England. Most of its members were drawn from the choirs of St Philip's Church and St. Bartholemew's Chapel, who had met at Cooke's Coffee Shop in the Cherry Orchard in Birmingham since the 1730s.

The Musical and Amicable Society was influential in the establishment of the Birmingham Triennial Music Festival in 1768, its members forming the festival's first chorus, but it was also concerned with conviviality, as was indicated by the preamble to its first printed rules: "May the catch and the glass go about and about / And another succeed to the bottle that's out".
