= John Crosdill =

English musician, cellist and violist

John Crosdill (1751–1825) was an English musician, cellist and violist.

== Biography ==
Crosdill was born in London, England and was the son of violoncellist Richard Crosdill (1698–1790) with whom he is sometimes confused. John Crosdill, along with James Cervetto (1747–1837), son of Italian émigré Giacobbe Cervetto (1682–1783), was one of the most visible cellists in London during the 1770s and 1780s. Crosdill was a skilled performer but not a strong composer. He played concertos, concertinas, continuo sonatas and chamber music; both solos and orchestral parts. Crosdill's musical training began when, at a young age, he became a chorister at Westminster Abbey under the direction of John Robinson and Benjamin Cooke. He later took up violoncello under his father's tutelage.

=== Musical career ===
Crosdill made his first public appearance as a violoncellist at age nine when Emanuel Siprutini (1730–1790), his probable teacher, presented him in a duo. He was accepted into the Royal Society of Musicians in 1768, at the age of seventeen. In the spring of 1775, Crosdill played at the King's Theatre in the oratorios sponsored by Johann Christian Bach (1735–1782). He subsequently played for the oratorios at Covent Garden in 1777 and at Drury Lane in 1779, 1782 and 1784. Crosdill was the principal cellist for the Three Choirs Festival, each year from 1769, (except 1778) and was principal violoncellist for the Concerts of Ancient Music from its establishment in 1776 until his retirement. On 10 March 1778 Crosdill became violist in the Chapel Royal. In 1782, Crosdill was appointed chamber musician to Queen Charlotte and violoncello instructor to the Prince of Wales (later George IV). It was this appointment that made Crosdill the most fashionable violoncello teacher of his day. His resulting acclaim led to the performance of many private concerts for nobility including the Friday afternoon ladies' concerts which he organised. Crosdill's 1784 appointment to Composer and Master of the King's Band in Ireland by the Duke of Rutland, was controversial. Many elite professional musicians, including Dr Charles Burney (1726–1814), thought Crosdill unworthy of this sinecure. Crosdill played in the annual productions of Messiah and was principal violoncellist for the 1784 Handel commemorative concerts given at Westminster Abbey.

During his prime, Crosdill made many sojourns to Paris where he was a favourite of Marie Antoinette. There he studied with and became close friends with the Duport brothers, Jean-Pierre Duport (1741–1818), and Jean-Louis Duport (1749–1819). He was member of Giovanni Batista Viotti's (1755–1825) orchestra for the Concert de la Loge Olympique in 1780. Crosdill returned to England permanently in 1785. That year he spent the Spring concert season performing in the Pantheon Series and organised competition with Hanover Square Series for which James Cervetto (1747–1837) played. The Pantheon series included numerous performances by the Maras; vocalist Gertrud Elisabeth Mara and her husband violoncellist Johann Baptist Mara (1744–1808). It was through his association with the Maras that Crosdill met Haydn in 1791 and purchased the "Mara" Stradivari in 1802. Crosdill taught many of the next generation of violoncellists, including Robert Lindley (1776–1855).

=== Marriage ===
Social eyebrows were raised when Crosdill married Elizabeth, née Thresher, the wealthy widow of Robert Colebrook, (brother of Sir George Colebrooke), on 31 May 1785 at St. Marylebone Church, London. Elizabeth was many years Crosdill's senior and her comfortable income from interests in Wiltshire, allowed him to retire from public performance. He did, however, perform two years at the Three Choirs Festival in Gloucester and the coronation of George IV on 19 July 1821. His wife, who died in 1807, bequeathed all her estates to her surviving sisters, with Crosdill's name only mentioned in the probate note. Sources give conflicting information about his death in early October 1825. Most say he died in Escrick, Yorkshire, at the home of a nephew of his friend Beilby Thompson. Others maintain that he died at his house in London.

By his will signed at 45 Berners Street on 30 August 1825 and proved at London on 25 October 1825, his son from a subsequent marriage, Lieutenant Colonel John Crosdill of the East India Company, inherited a substantial fortune. Crosdill left bequests of 19 guineas each for remembrance rings to numerous friends including the musicians Joseph Haydn, Benjamin Blake and William Shield, his Berners Street neighbour. Lieut-Col Crosdill presented the Royal Society of Musicians with £1000 in accordance with his father's will.
