= Royal Hotel, Birmingham =

Hotel in England

Coordinates: 52°28′52″N 1°53′48″W

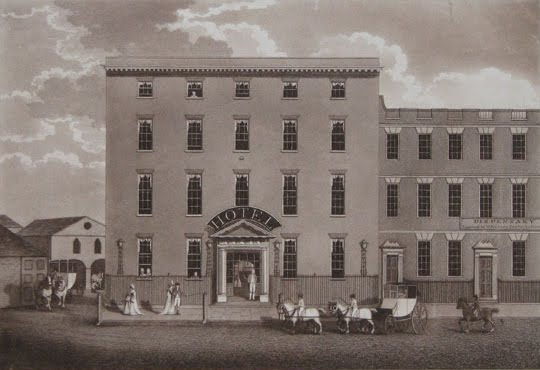
Engraving of the Hotel in 1800

The Royal Hotel, originally just The Hotel, was a hotel located on Temple Row in Birmingham, England. Opened in 1772, it was the first establishment in Birmingham to describe itself as a "hotel", a new term entering usage around this time to denote a more fashionable and genteel establishment than the more traditional inn.

Notable guests who stayed at the hotel included Louis XVIII of France, Lord Nelson, the Duke of Gloucester and Queen Victoria. As well as accommodation for visitors, the hotel included assembly rooms that formed Birmingham's main meeting place for polite social gatherings during the later part of the Midlands Enlightenment. 80 feet long and 30 feet wide, the assembly rooms included an organ and space for an orchestra, and were decorated in a "tasteful and decorative manner" with three large chandeliers, six large mirrors and five cut glass lustres designed to reflect candlelight throughout the room. The room was accessed through a "spacious saloon" and up a grand staircase.

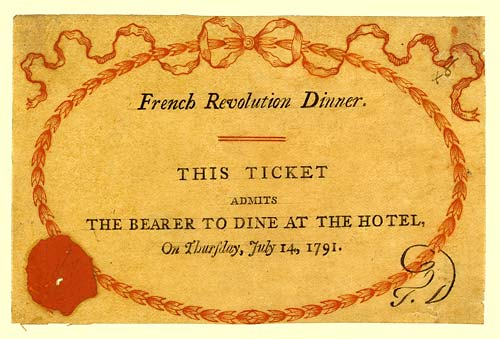
Ticket for the dinner at the Hotel celebrating the second anniversary of the storming of the Bastille on 14 July 1791 that led to the Priestley Riots

The building of the hotel was motivated by criticism of Sawyer's Assembly Rooms in Old Square in 1765 by the Duke of York, who remarked that "a town of such magnitude as Birmingham, and adorned with so much beauty, deserved a superior accommodation, that the room itself was mean, but the entrance still meaner". In response to this slight a group of influential local figures met at Widow Aston's Coffee House in Cherry Street in 1770 and resolved to raise £4,000 to build a hotel worthy of the town's reputation. The result was the establishment of a tontine, that eventually raised £15,000 with subscribers including John Ash, founder of Birmingham General Hospital; Matthew Boulton, the owner of the Soho Manufactory; Charles Holte of Aston Hall; John Taylor, one of the founders of Lloyds Bank; and Lunar Society member Thomas Day.

The principal events of the social season at the hotel during its early years were its Subscription Dancing Assemblies, and series of concerts held by Jeremiah Clark and the Birmingham Dilettanti Musical Society. In 1788 these were combined to form a single social season which featured six concerts and balls held every month during the winter, with card and dancing assemblies during the intervening fortnights, and a separate season of monthly concerts during the summer. From 1790 the hotel was one of the venues for the Birmingham Triennial Music Festival.

On 14 July 1791 the hotel was the venue for the dinner to celebrate the storming of the Bastille that was to lead to the Priestley Riots, and on 14 December 1829 it was the site of the founding of Thomas Attwood's Birmingham Political Union.

The hotel retained an upmarket reputation throughout its existence, but with only three shares remaining and the lease on the hotel expiring, the tontine was wound up in 1861 and the hotel sold for redevelopment.
