= James Cervetto =

English cellist and composer

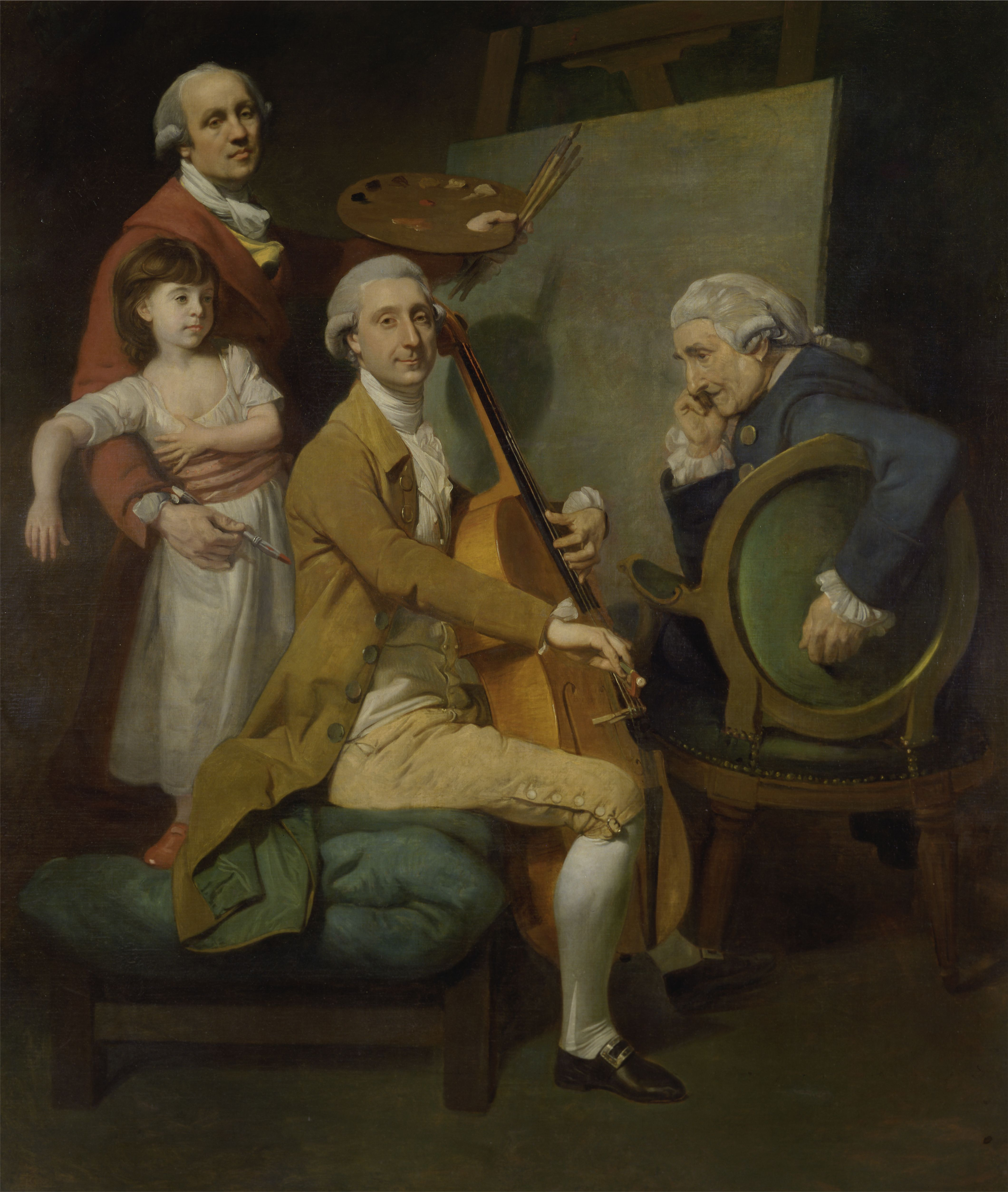
Self-portrait of Johan Zoffany with his daughter Maria Theresa, James Cervetto and Giacobbe Cervetto; at the Yale Center for British Art

James Cervetto (8 January 1748 – 5 February 1837) was an English cellist, playing in aristocratic venues and in important concerts of the day. He was the soloist for the premiere of Haydn’s Second Cello Concerto.

== Life ==
Cervetto was born in London in 1748; his father was the cellist Giacobbe Cervetto (whose original family name was Basevi), from whom he learned to play the instrument. He soon excelled on the cello, and his first public concert took place on 23 April 1760 at the Little Theatre, Haymarket, with other musicians of similar age (including Gertrud Elisabeth Mara, at this time playing violin, later a soprano). From 1763 he played in many of the capital cities of Europe.

In 1771 he joined the Queen's private orchestra, and in 1780 he became a member of Lord Abingdon's private orchestra. He was a soloist at the "Professional Concerts" in the Hanover Square Rooms, from their establishment in 1783 until 1794. He was a member of the Royal Society of Musicians for 72 years.

At a concert in the Hanover Square Rooms on 24 March 1784, Cervetto gave the first performance of Haydn's Second Cello Concerto, and repeated the work one week later. Reports of the time show that it was written for Cervetto; it is thought that Haydn, informed of Cervetto's abilities, composed the work so as to have its particular character and technical challenges.

In the early part of his career he was in friendly rivalry with the cellist John Crosdill. In 1783 his father died, leaving him £20,000, and he became less active in his profession. His last known concert took place on 2 March 1795 at Frederick, Duke of York's residence York House, Picadilly, at which George III was present.

James Cervetto died in London on 5 February 1837, "leaving," wrote George Grove, "a few unimportant pieces for his instrument behind him". Amongst his legatees were the architect George Basevi and Maria D'Israeli (née Basevi), the mother of the politician Benjamin Disraeli.
