= Moor Street Theatre =

Defunct building in Birmingham, England

Coordinates: 52.4802°N 1.8912°W

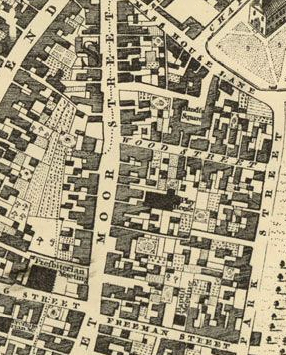
The Moor Street Theatre, marked as the "Play House", on Samuel Bradford's 1751 map of Birmingham

The Moor Street Theatre was the first regular theatre – as distinct from earlier booths and converted barns for strolling players – to be established in Birmingham, England. Located in a back yard between Moor Street and Park Street north of the Bull Ring, it opened in 1740 with a performance of "Oratorio with Vocal and Instrumental Musick".

Although the theatre was not purpose-built for dramatic performances, surviving records show that it had boxes, a pit, a balcony and two galleries, together with significant backstage machinery, suggesting that it was a substantial structure. Plays were performed on Monday, Wednesday and Friday evenings between July and October. During cold weather the theatre was heated by burning fires for two days before a performance.

Like all early Birmingham theatres the Moor Street Theatre was not licensed for dramatic performance, so technically charged for the performance of music during the interval - the play itself being given free of charge. The top seat prices of 2 shillings and 6 pence suggest a well-off audience and, following the lead of David Garrick, performances were given in costumes "proper to the play".

The theatre was managed by John Ward during the 1740s, who had established Birmingham's first professional theatre company – the Warwickshire Company of Comedians – by 1744. A visit in 1751 by Richard Yates and 'His Majesty's Servants from the Theatres Royal in London' – essentially the company from the Theatre Royal, Drury Lane – was so successful that Yates' company was installed permanently in the theatre, and two years later Yates was encouraged to open the much larger King Street Theatre. The Moor Street Theatre was increasingly unable to compete and closed in 1763.

The composer Barnabas Gunn promoted orchestral concerts at the theatre from 1740, the earliest secular classical music concerts recorded in Birmingham.

The existence of two theatres in the town had been controversial with Birmingham's religious non-conformists. When the closed Moor Street Theatre was converted into a Methodist chapel in 1764, John Wesley preached how "Happy would it be, if all playhouses in the kingdom were converted to so good an use", though some elements of the town evidently disagreed, and stoned the congregation as they left.

== Bibliography ==
- Cunningham, John E. (1950), Theatre Royal: the history of the Theatre Royal, Birmingham, Oxford: George Ronald, OCLC 2858220
- Handford, Margaret. "Birmingham". Grove Music Online. Oxford: Oxford University Press.
- Price, Victor J. (1988), Birmingham Theatres, Concert and Music Halls, Studley: Brewin Books, ISBN 0-947731-35-0
- Salberg, Derek (1980), Ring down the curtain: a fascinating record of Birmingham theatres and contemporary life through three centuries, Luton: Cortney Publications, ISBN 0-904378-08-X
- Stephens, W. B. (1964), "Social History before 1815", in Stephens, W.B. (ed.), The City of Birmingham, The Victoria History Of The County Of Warwick, vol. VII, Oxford: Oxford University Press, pp. 209–222
- Thompson, Ann (1999), "'I'll have grounds / More relative than this': The Puzzle of John Ward's 'Hamlet' Promptbooks", The Yearbook of English Studies, 29: 138–150, ISSN 0306-2473, JSTOR 3508939
