= Maverick Theatre Company =

Maverick Theatre Company was launched in 1994 by the Lord Mayor of Birmingham and founded by Robb Williams, local musician and Nick Hennegan, radio presenter with BRMB Radio. The company aimed to demystify theatre by presenting contemporary classics in informal spaces, mainly pubs. The company grew from a production in Birmingham and at the Edinburgh Festival, including Henry V - Lion of England, Nick Hennegan's one-person version of Shakespeare's classic. Maverick began working in London and launched the London Literary Pub Crawl in 2012.
