= Willie Hines =

Australian rules footballer (1880–1959)

Personal information
- Full name: William James Hines
- Born: 28 April 1880; Drysdale, Victoria
- Died: 17 December 1959 (aged 79); Geelong, Victoria

Playing career^{1}
Years	Club	Games (Goals)
1903	Geelong	7 (5)
- ^{1} Playing statistics correct to the end of 1903.

William James Hines (28 April 1880 – 17 December 1959) was an Australian rules footballer who played with Geelong in the Victorian Football League (VFL).
