= List of numismatic journals =

This is a list of magazines and academic journals that focus on numismatics.

== Argentina ==
- Boletin bimestral - Asociacion Numismatica Argentina
- Cuadernos de numismática y ciencias históricas - Centro Numismático Buenos Aires
- El Telegráfo del Centro : gacetilla del Centro Numismático, Buenos Aires

== Armenia ==
- Hay dramagitakan handes
- Armenian Numismatic Research Organization

== Australia ==
- Journal of the Numismatic Association of Australia
- Australian numismatic journal
- The Australian numismatist
- Perth Numismatic Journal
- Journal of the Australian Numismatic Society
- Bulletin - Australian Numismatic Society, Brisbane Branch
- Queensland Numismatic Society magazine
- The South Australian numismatic journal

== Austria ==
- Mitteilungen der Oesterreichischen Gesellschaft für Münz- und Medaillenkunde
- Mitteilungen der Österreichischen Numismatischen Gesellschaft (MÖNG)
- Mitteilungsblatt - Institut für Numismatik und Geldgeschichte, Universität Wien
- Monatsblatt der numismatischen Gesellschaft in Wien
- Nachrichtenblatt der Österreichischen Numismatischen Gesellschaft
- Wiener numismatische Monatshefte
- Numismatische Zeitschrift (NZ)

== Belgium ==
- La médaille en Belgique
- Revue belge de numismatique
- Revue belge de numismatique et de sigillographie
- Revue de la numismatique belge

== Brazil ==
- Boletim - Sociedade Numismática do Rio de Janeiro.
- Boletim de numismatica - Sociedade Numismatica Brasileira
- Revista do Clube da Medalha do Brasil

== Bulgaria ==
Numismatics, Sigillography and Epigraphy (annual) - Нумизматика, сфрагистика и епиграфика (годишник)

== Canada ==
- Behind the MASC - Medallic Art Society of Canada
- Canadian Numismatic Journal
- Transactions of the Canadian Numismatic Research Society

== China ==
- Anhui qianbi 《安徽钱币》 [Anhui Numismatics] - Anhui Numismatic Society
- Chao piao 《钞票》 [Paper Money]
- Gansu jinrong 《甘肃金融》 [Gansu Finance] - Gansu Numismatic Society
- Neimeng jinrong 《内蒙金融》 [Inner Mongolia Finance] - Inner Mongolia Numismatic Society
- Qianbi bolan 《钱币博览》 - Shanghai Numismatic Society
- Suzhou qianbi 《苏州钱币》 [Suzhou Numismatics]
- Xibu jinrong 《西部金融》 [West China Finance]
- Xinjiang qianbi 《新疆钱币》 [Xinjiang Numismatics]
- Yunnan jinrong 《云南金融] [Yunnan Finance]
- Zhongguo qianbi 《中国钱币》 [China Numismatics] - China Numismatic Society
- Zhongguo sichao 《中国私钞》 [China Private Banknotes]
- Zhoushan qianbi 《舟山钱币》 [Zhoushan Numismatics] - Zhoushan Numismatic Society

== Cuba ==
- Boletin numismatica - Museo Numismatico, Banco Nacional de Cuba

== Czechia ==
- Folia numismatica : supplementum ad Acta Musei Moraviae
- Moravské numismatické zprávy
- Numismatické listy
- Numismatické zprávy
- Numismatický časopis
- Numismatický sborník
- Slezský numismatik

== Finland ==
- Mitali medaljen
- Mitalitaiteen vuosikirja = Årsboken för medaljikonst
- Numismaattinen aikakauslehti : Finsk numismatisk tidskrift

== France ==
- Annales du Groupe numismatique du Comtat et de Provence
- Bulletin de la Société Française de Numismatique
- Bulletin - Le Club français de la médaille
- Bulletin du Cercle d'Études Numismatiques
- Cahiers numismatiques : bulletin de la Société d'études numismatiques et archéologiques
- Dossiers de la monnaie
- La gazette numismatique
- Gazette numismatique française
- Le livre des mereils : bulletin du Centre National de Recherche sur les Jetons et les Méreaux du Moyen Age
- Numismatique asiatique - Société de numismatique asiatique

== Germany ==
- Beiträge zur Münzkunde in Hessen-Kassel
- Berliner Blätter für Münz, Siegel- und Wappenkunde
- Berliner Münzblatter
- Berliner numismatische Forschungen
- Berliner numismatische Zeitschrift
- Blätter für Münzfreunde
- Blätter für Münzfreunde und Münzforschung
- Deutsche Münzblätter
- Deutsches Jahrbuch für Numismatik
- Dresdner numismatische Hefte
- Frankfurter Münzzeitung
- Geldgeschichtliche Nachrichten
- Der Geldscheinsammler : Zeitschrift für Papiergeld
- Glanzstücke aus der Numismatischen Sammlung der Deutschen Bundesbank
- Hamburger Beiträge zur Numismatik
- Medaillenkabinett : Mitteilungen der Deutschen Medaillengesellschaft
- Medaillen Plaketten
- Mitteilungen der Bayerischen Numismatischen Gesellschaft
- Die Münze. Informationen für Münzensammler und solche, die es werden wollen
- Norddeutsches Jarhbuch für Münzkunde und verwandte Gebierte

== Greece ==
- Nomismatika chronika - Hellenikes Nomismatikes Hetaireias

== Hong Kong ==
- Hong Kong Numismatic Society newsletter

== Hungary ==
- Evkönyve / a Magyar Numizmatikai Társulat

== India ==
- ICCG News : http://iccg.in/newspaper.php "Indian Coins & Currency Group" ICCG News Numismatic Monthly News Paper of India
- Coin : journal of the Numismatic Society of Calcutta.
- Journal of the Numismatic Society of India - Numismatic Society of India
- Indian Coin Society newsletter
- The Indian numismatic chronicle
- Mudra - Numismatic Society of Calcutta
- Numismatic Digest

== Israel ==
- Alon - Israel Numismatic Society
- Israel Numismatic Bulletin
- Israel Numismatic Journal
- Israel Numismatic Research

== Italy ==
- Annotazioni numismatiche
- Annali dell'Istituto Italiano di Numismatica
- Atti e memorie dell'Istituto italiano di numismatica
- Bollettino del Circolo Numismatico Napoletano
- Bollettino di numismatica
- Bollettino di numismatica italiana
- Bollettino italiana di numismatica e di arte della medaglia
- Bullettino di numismatica e sfragistica per la storia d'Italia
- Historia mundi : le medaglie raccontano la storia, l'arte, la cultura dell'uomo
- Ieri e oggi : periodico d'informazione sulla medaglia
- Italia numismatica
- Medaglia
- Memorie dell'Accademia italiana di studi filatelici e numismatici
- Rassegna monetaria
- Rassegna numismatica
- Rivista Italiana di Numismatica e Scienze Affini
- Quaderni del Civico museo archeologico e del Civico gabinetto numismatico di Milano

== Japan ==
- Hōsenka : kosen ga kataru rekishi to bunka - Hadoson Tōyō Chūzō Kahei Kenkyūjo
- Sutsudo senka [Excavated coins] - Shutsudo Senka Kenkyūkai

== Macedonia ==
- Macedonski numizmatichki glasnik

== Malaysia ==
- Newsletter - Malaysia Numismatic Society

== Nepal ==
- Mudrā / Mudraa : journal of Nepal Numismatic Society

== The Netherlands ==
- De Geuzenpenning : munt- en penningkundig nieuws (1951–1976): https://debeeldenaar.nl/archief.html
- De Florijn (1972–1977): https://debeeldenaar.nl/archief.html
- Jaarboek voor Munt- en Penningkunde (1893–current): https://jaarboekvoormuntenpenningkunde.nl/
- De Beeldenaar (1977–current): https://debeeldenaar.nl/archief.html
- De Muntkoerier: https://www.muntkoerier.com/

== Norway ==
- Norsk Numismatisk Tidsskrift, Norwegian Numismatic Journal (former NNF-nytt): https://www.norsknum.org/

== Poland ==
- Biuletyn / Muzeum Sztuki Medalierskiej we Wrocławiu
- Biuletyn numizmatyczny
- Łódzki numizmatyk
- Wiadomości numizmatyczne
- Notae Numismaticae-Zapiski Numizmatyczne https://mnk.pl/notae-numismaticae-zapiski-numizmatyczne-1

== Portugal ==
- Moeda : rivista portuguesa de numismática e medalhistica
- Numismática : orgão informativo do Clube Numismático de Portugal

== Romania ==
- Buletinul Societătii Numismatice Române http://www.snr-1903.ro/bsnr/bsnr.html
- Cercetări numismatice http://www.cercetarinumismatice.ro/
- Studii si cercetări de numismatică http://www.scnjournal.ro/
- Revista de Cercetări Arheologice şi Numismatice http://rcan.muzeulbucurestiului.ro/
- Monedă si comert în Sud-Estul Europei https://www.brukenthalmuseum.ro/publicatii/04.htm
- Cronica Numismatică şi Arheologică http://www.snr-1903.ro/cna/cna.html

== Russia ==
- Memoires de la Société d'archéologie et de numismatique de St. Pétersbourg

== Slovenia ==
- Slovenská numizmatika

== Spain ==
- Caesaraugusta : publicaciones del Seminario de Arqueología y Numismática Aragonesas
- NVMISMA Sociedad Iberoamericana de Estudios Numismáticos. SIAEN. Museo Casa de la Moneda

== Sweden ==
- Göteborgs numismatiska förenings småskrifter
- Mynt kontakt : Svensk numismatisk tidskrift https://numismatik.se/2publikationer/snt2024.php

== Switzerland ==
- Schweizer Munzblatter - Swiss Numismatic Society
- Schweizerische Numismatische Rundschau (Swiss Numismatic Review) - Swiss Numismatic Society
- Bulletin de la Société Suisse de Numismatique
- Helvetische Münzenzeitung

== Turkey ==
- Bülten - Türk Nümismatik Dernegi
- Kairos: Anatolian Numismatic Studies

== United Kingdom and Ireland ==
- British Association of Numismatic Societies Yearbook / Cunobelin (1954–1960) - journal of the British Association of Numismatic Societies (BANS)
- The British Numismatic Journal (1903/4–current) - journal of the British Numismatic Society
- Bulletin - Numismatic Society of Ireland
- Cartwheel : journal of the Birmingham Numismatic Society
- CCNB Newsletter - predecessor of Money and Medals Newsletter
- Classical Numismatic Review (incorporating Seaby Coin & Medal Bulletin) (1991–current)
- Coin News (1989–current)
- Coin Hoards - Royal Numismatic Society
- Counterfoil - British Banking History Society (formerly British Cheque Collectors Society)
- The Escallop - Reading Coin Club
- Format (1978–current)
- The Groat : bulletin of the St.Albans & Herts Numismatic Society
- Hamilton's Coin & Medal Despatch (1978–1988)
- Irish Numismatics (1968–1983)
- Journal of the Liverpool Numismatic Society (1873/4–1876)
- JONS: Journal of the Oriental Numismatic Society JONS
- KOINON: The International Journal of Classical Numismatic Studies (2018–current) KOINON
- Manchester Numismatic Society Proceedings (1864–1873)
- Manx coin recorder
- The Medal
- Money and Medals Newsletter
- The Numismatic Journal (1836/7–1837/8) - predecessor of the Numismatic Chronicle
- The Numismatic Chronicle (1838/9–current) - journal of the Royal Numismatic Society
- Numismatic Circular (1892–current) - Spink & Son Ltd
- The Numismatic Gazette (1962–1967) - predecessor of The Numismatic Gazette Quarterly
- The Numismatic Gazette Quarterly (1968)
- Numismatic Quarterly (1881) - predecessor of The Numismatic Magazine
- Numismatic Magazine (1886–1903)
- Numismatic Society of Ireland - Occasional Papers (1965–1988)
- The Numismatist (1889–1890)
- Numismatology (1892–1894)
- Oriental Numismatic Society Newsletter - predecessor of Journal of the Oriental Numismatic Society
- Sacra Moneta - Galata (1981–current)
- S&B's Coin and Medal Bulletin (1991–current)
- Seaby's Coin & Medal Bulletin (1945–1991)
- Seaby's Coin & Medal List (1926–1945)
- Token Corresponding Society Bulletin (1971/3–current) - journal of the Token Corresponding Society
- Transactions of the Yorkshire Numismatic Society

== United States ==
- The American Journal of Numismatics - American Numismatic Society
- The American Journal of Numismatics, and Bulletin of American Numismatic and Archeological Societies
- The Asylum - Numismatic Bibliomania Society
- The E-sylum - Numismatic Bibliomania Society
- Fun money : the American Play Money Society newsletter
- KOINON: The International Journal of Classical Numismatic Studies (2018–current) KOINON
- The MCA Advisory : the newsletter of the Medal Collectors of America
- Medallic sculpture - American Medallic Sculpture Association
- Members exchange - American Medallic Sculpture Association
- Proceedings of the Numismatic and Antiquarian Society of Philadelphia
- Journal of Early American Numismatics
- Colonial Newsletter
- Colonial Coin Collectors Club Newsletter

== Also ==
- Acta numismatica
- Archéonumis : revue de numismatique et d'archeologie
- Archiv für Medaillen- und Plaketten-Kunde : Internationale illustrierte Zeitschrift
- Badge Collectors' Circle newsletter
- The Badger - Badge Collectors' Circle
- Bahia numismatica
- De Beeldenaar : tweemaandelijks tijdschrift voor Numismatiek en Penningkunst
- Boletín del Instituto de Numismática e Historia de San Nicolás de los Arroyos
- Bulletin - Association des Amis du Cabinet des Médailles
- Bulletin -/ Association des Amis du Musée Monétaire Cantonal
- Bulletin de la Société d'étude pour l'histoire du papier-monnaie
- Bulletin international de numismatique
- Bulletin of the Pub Check Study Group
- Cercle : informació numismàtica
- Chopmark News - Chopmark Collectors Club
- The "Conder" token collector's journal
- Counterfeit : journal of the Counterfeit Coin Club
- Courrier numismatique
- Crónica numismática
- Cronica numismatica si arheologica
- The Dud : bulletin of the Counterfeit Collector's Society
- Emblematica : an interdisciplinary journal for emblem studies
- Equilibrium : quarterly magazine of the International Society of Antique Scale Collectors
- Flash medailles
- Gaceta numismática
- Gazetta numismatica
- Hekte : a journal of classical numismatics
- The hobby world : a magazine for numismatics and other hobbies
- IBNS journal - International Bank Note Society
- Journal international d'archéologie numismatique
- The Journal of East Asian numismatics (JEAN)
- Journal of the Civil War Token Society
- The Journal of the Classical & Medieval Numismatic Society
- Journal of the Russian Numismatic Society
- Journal of the Token and Medal Society
- Kunst medaljen : tidsskrift for kunstmedaljesamlere
- Litterae numismaticae Vindobonenses
- The Medal Collector
- The Medallist
- Mélanges de numismatique
- Métal pensant : revue de la médaille d'art
- Mitteilungen für Münzsammler
- Moneta : Meddelanden fran Skånes numismatiska förening
- Monete Antiche : bimestrale di cultura numismatica
- Money trend : internationales Magazine für Münzen und Papiergeld
- Le Moniteur de la Numismatique, de la Sigillographie et autres branches auxiliaires de l'histoire
- Monnaie magazine : lein phare le magazine de l'information numismatique
- Mudra : a quarterly research journal of Coin Study Circle
- De muntkoerier : onafhankelijk maandblad voor de muntverzamelaar in de Benelux = Revue mensuelle de la numismatique = Zeitschrift für Numischmatik
- De muntmeester : tijdschrift van de Diestse studiekring voor numismatiek
- Münzen Revue
- Münzen & Sammeln : Zeitschrift für Münzen, Papiergeld, Orden und Medaillen
- Der Münzen- und Medaillensammler : Berichte aus allen Gebieten der Geld-, Münsen- und Medaillenkunde
- Münzstudien
- News bulletin - Chandrapur Coin Society
- Nomisma
- Skandinavisk numismatik : mynt & medaljer
- Sprawozdania numizmatyczne
- Studien zu Fundmünzen der Antike
- Treasure hunting
- Trident : a journal for collectors of ancient coins and antiquities
- Trierer Petermännchen : Beiträge zur Numismatik und Trierer Heimatkunde
- T'ung pao - Society for Oriental Numismatics
- Whitman numismatic journal

== Sources ==
- Numismatic Guide to British and Irish Periodicals 1836–1995, by Harrington E. Manville, Encyclopaedia of British Numismatics, Part 2 (Numismatic) (London: AH Baldwin & Sons Ltd, and Spink & Son Ltd, 1997)
- Worldcat Numismatics Periodicals
- Library of the Dept of Coins and Medals, British Museum
