= King Street Theatre =

The King Street Theatre was the first purpose-built theatre to open in Birmingham, England. The town had had earlier theatres, but the Theatre in Smallbrook Street, whose origins dated back to 1715, and Theatre in New Street, which was in an existence a few years later, were both makeshift structures; and the more substantial Moor Street Theatre, which opened in 1740, was a conversion of an existing building. King Street was a much more ambitious undertaking, being based on the examples of the established London patent theatres.

The theatre opened on 25 September 1751 with its first performance being a "Shakespeare Night and Concert of Vocal and Instrumental Musicians". Seats in a box cost 3 shillings, in the pit they cost 2 shillings, and in the gallery 1 shilling. Performances started at 7pm and, like its predecessor in Moor Street, the season lasted from early June until the end of September. King Street was built for the actor-manager Richard Yates – then at the peak of his fame at London's Theatre Royal, Drury Lane – after his highly successful visit to Birmingham the previous year with "a company who announced themselves 'His Majesty's Servants, from the theatres royal, in London'".

By 1760 the King Street Theatre was under the direction of Thomas Hull and its regular patrons included Hull's close friend William Shenstone, one of the recognised leaders of local society in the era of the Midlands Enlightenment. King Street hosted the premiere of an original play when Hull's Henry II; or, Tha Fall of Rosamond was written and performed at Shenstone's instigation on 28 August 1761, over a decade before premieres at Bristol in 1775, Richmond in 1776, Manchester in 1778 and York in 1779 provide evidence of such creative activity taking place in other towns outside London. By June 1762 Hull maintaining a theatre company at King Street with Joseph Younger, who was to retain his connection with the theatre until 1779, The Moor Street Theatre was increasingly unable to compete and closed in 1763, leaving King Street unchallenged as Birmingham's leading theatre for the next decade.

== Bibliography ==
- Crompton Rhodes, Raymond (1924), The Theatre Royal, Birmingham, 1774-1924: a short history, Birmingham: Moody Brothers, OCLC 10940797
- Cunningham, John E. (1950), Theatre Royal: the history of the Theatre Royal, Birmingham, Oxford: George Ronald, OCLC 2858220
- Highfill, Philip H.; Burnim, Kalman A.; Langhans, Edward A. (1993), "Younger, Joseph 1734—1784, actor, prompter, manager.", A Biographical Dictionary of Actors, Actresses, Musicians, Dancers, Managers, and Other Stage Personnel in London, 1660-1800, vol. 16, Carbondale: Southern Illinois University Press, pp. 364–368, ISBN 0809318032
- Money, John (1977), Experience and identity: Birmingham and the West Midlands, 1760–1800, Manchester University Press, ISBN 978-0-7190-0672-2
- Price, Cecil (1973), "Theatres outside London", Theatre in the Age of Garrick, Oxford: Basil Blackwell, pp. 175–195, ISBN 063114790X
- Price, Victor J. (1988), Birmingham Theatres, Concert and Music Halls, Studley: Brewin Books, ISBN 0-947731-35-0
- Salberg, Derek (1980), Ring down the curtain: a fascinating record of Birmingham theatres and contemporary life through three centuries, Luton: Cortney Publications, ISBN 0-904378-08-X
- Symons, David (2006), "A pass for the 'Birmingham Theatre', 1774" (PDF), British Numismatic Journal, 76, British Numismatic Society: 312–322, archived from the original (PDF) on 2015-04-02
- Stephens, W. B. (1964), "Social History before 1815", in Stephens, W.B. (ed.), The City of Birmingham, The Victoria History Of The County Of Warwick, vol. VII, Oxford: Oxford University Press, pp. 209–222
