= William Hine =

English organist and composer (1687–1730)

William Hine (1687–1730) was an English organist and composer.

Hine was born at Brightwell, Oxfordshire.

== Career ==
He was a chorister of Magdalen College, Oxford in 1694, and a clerk in 1705. Coming to London, he studied music under Jeremiah Clarke, whose executive style he closely imitated. In 1711 or 1712. Hine became organist of Gloucester Cathedral, and shortly afterwards married Alicia, the daughter of Abraham Rudhall, the bellfounder. The dean and chapter of Gloucester showed their appreciation of Hine's services by voluntarily increasing his yearly salary by 20 pounds, as is recorded in the mural tablet over his grave in the cloisters. Hine's chief pupils were Richard Church and William Hayes, whose son, Dr. Philip Hayes, presented a portrait of Hine to the Oxford Music School.

== Death ==
He died on 28 August 1730, aged 43. After Hine's death, his widow published by subscription Harmonia Sacra Glocestriensis, or Select Anthems for 1, 2, and 3 Voices, &c. The volume contains the anthems Save me, Rejoice in the Lord, O ye righteous, I will magnify Thee, and the Jubilate (with Hall's Te Deum). His wife died on 28 June 1735.

Cultural offices
| Preceded by Stephen Jeffries | Organist and Master of the Choristers of Gloucester Cathedral; 1710–1730 | Succeeded by Barnabas Gunn |
