= Holte Bridgman's Apollo Gardens =

Coordinates: 52.471846°N 1.888751°W

Holte Bridgman's Apollo Gardens were one of the main pleasure gardens of 18th century Birmingham, located on Moseley Street in Deritend, within the parish of Aston.

Entertainments at the Apollo included music – concerts of trios and duets by Arne and Handel are recorded in 1748 – and fireworks. The Apollo was also the site of the first cricket match definitely recorded to have taken place within Birmingham, when "Eleven of the Gentlemen of the Holte Bridgman's Club and Eleven of the Gentlemen of Mr Thomas Bellamy's Club" played "the most of three innings, for Twenty-Two Guineas" on Monday 15 July 1751.

Although the Apollo Gardens were smaller and less successful than their principal rival, the Birmingham Vauxhall Gardens in Duddeston, an article from 1787 in Aris's Birmingham Gazette described them as "lovely, sequestered and elegant" and described how they could be reached by pleasure boat on the River Rea, travelling under the bridges of Deritend, Bradford Street and Cheapside past field paths "gay with wild flowers".

The garden closed in 1751 when its owner resumed his profession of house painting.
