= James Kempson =

James Kempson (1742 – 10 March 1822) was an English choirmaster, the founder of the Birmingham Musical and Amicable Society in 1762 and the Birmingham Triennial Music Festival in 1768.

Known in Birmingham as "Diddy" Kempson, he was still conducting in 1821.
