= John Alcock (organist, born 1740) =

English organist, died 1791

- Baptised: 28 January 1740
- Died: 30 March 1791 (aged 51)
- Education: University of Oxford
- Occupation: Organist

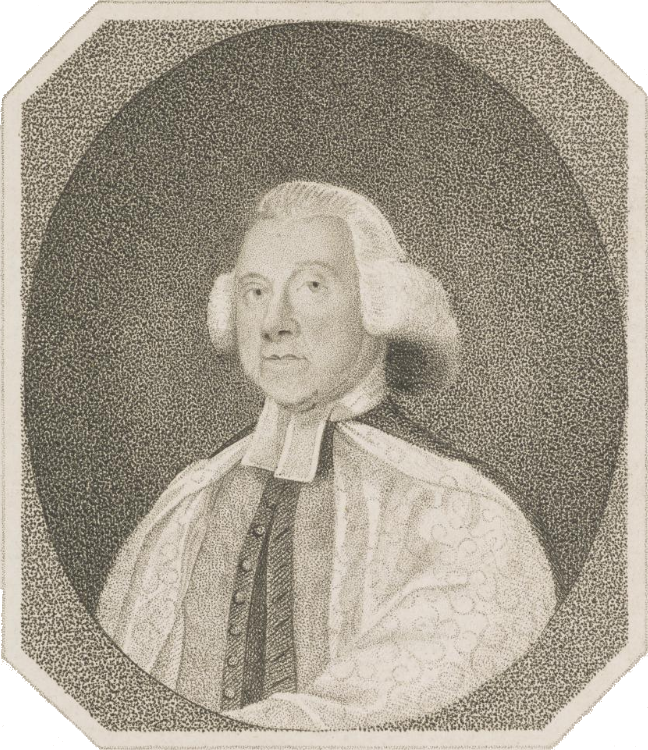
Portrait of John Alcock by Robert Cooper (d. 1828). It is unclear whether it is of John Alcock (1740-1791), as stated by the Scottish National Gallery, or of his father, John Alcock (1715–1806), as stated by the National Portrait Gallery.

John Alcock (bapt. 28 January 1740 – 30 March 1791) was an English organist, who composed several songs between 1770 and 1780.

== Biography ==
John Alcock was born around 1740, to Margaret Alcock, née Beaumont (1711–1792), and John Alcock (1715–1806), himself a famous composer and organist. He was born in Plymouth, Devon and baptised there on 28 January 1740. He learned to play the organ through his father's position as organist and master of the choristers at Lichfield Cathedral, working under him as a chorister. By the age of twelve he was deputising for his father on occasion.

Alcock's first professional position was as organist and master of the song school at Newark-on-Trent parish church, 1758 to 1768. In 1766, he accompanied his father to Oxford University, where he graduated with a Bachelor of Music in 1773, while his father proceeded to a Doctor of Music. In 1773, he became the organist of St Matthew's Church, Walsall, a position he maintained until his death.

Between 1770 and 1780, Alcock composed and published several songs, cantatas, and instrumental works, for both the harpsichord and strings. He collaborated in his father's publication, Six New Anthems (1795). Alcock composed alone Parochial Harmony, or a Collection of Divine-Music in Score (1777), published by Francis Roome (fl. 1777-1794), and "Expressly Composed for the use of Country Choirs", stating his position as "Batchelor in Music and Organist of Walsall" on the title page. Those of Alcock's published works, noted by the Dictionary of Composers for the Church in Great Britain and Ireland, are 'Arise, O Lord, and Lift Up' and 'The Lord is King'.

Alcock died on 30 March 1791, aged 51, at his house, near Walsall, predeceasing both his parents. His obituary was published in The Gentleman's Magazine. The obituary memorialized his compositions flatteringly as "much esteemed by all competent judges" and praised his "superior knowledge in musick, as well as his excellent performances on the organ, which always were in the true church style".
