= Woolwich Polytechnic =

Woolwich Polytechnic and Woolwich Polytechnic School are names shared by more than one institution:

- Woolwich Polytechnic School for Boys, a school located in Thamesmead, London
- Woolwich Polytechnic School for Girls, a school located in Thamesmead, London
- University of Greenwich, previously known as Woolwich Polytechnic
