= Blue Orange Theatre =

- Interactive map of Blue Orange Theatre
- Location: 118 Great Hampton Street, Jewellery Quarter, Birmingham, England
- Coordinates: 52.489191°N 1.9082658°W
- Type: Theatre

Construction
- Opened: 2011

Website
- www.blueorangetheatre.co.uk

The Blue Orange Theatre is an independent theatre located in the Jewellery Quarter in the centre of Birmingham, England. It was founded by the local producer and director Mark Webster and opened in April 2011, aiming to showcase new drama and writing from the city.

It is a 107-seat theatre and there is a bar and a rehearsal studio. The theatre acts as a producing theatre staging work by its own company, as well as hosting performances from visiting theatre companies.
