= Barnabas Gunn =

English organist and composer

Barnabas Gunn (c. 1680 – 6 February 1753) was an English organist and composer.

Gunn's date and place of birth are unknown, but he was appointed organist of the newly built St Philip's Church (now St Philip's Cathedral) in Birmingham in 1715. He spent nine years as the organist of Gloucester Cathedral from 1730, returning to Birmingham as organist of both St Philip's and St Martin in the Bull Ring in 1740, remaining there until his death.

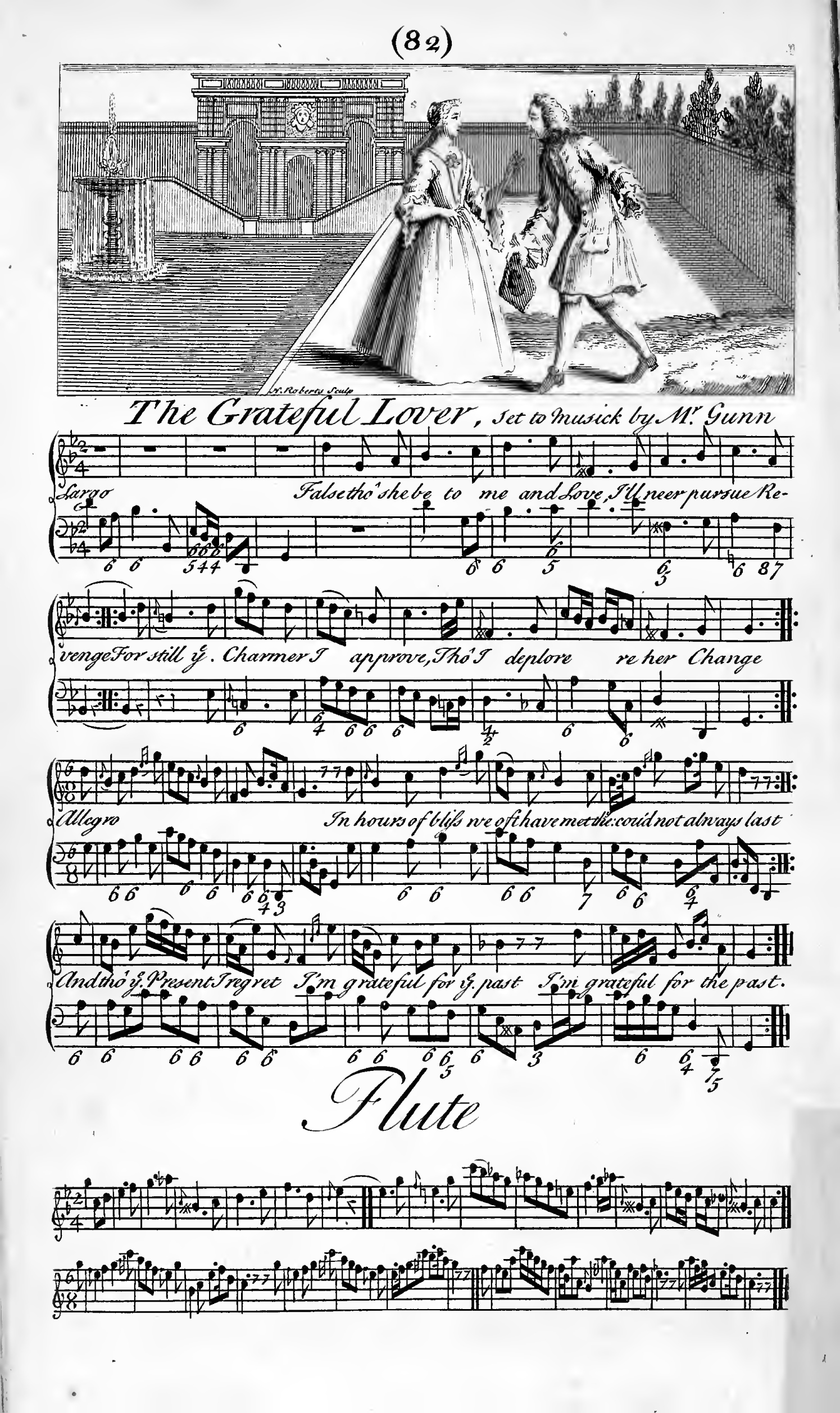
The Grateful Lover (1739)

Gunn's compositions included cantatas, songs, psalms and instrumental music for strings.

In 1751 a thinly veiled attack appeared in an anonymous pamphlet (attributed to William Hayes) entitled "The Art of Composing Music by a Method Entirely New ... Suited to the Meanest Capacity", suggesting that Gunn composed using a Spruzzarino - a fictional device that squirted random dots of ink onto manuscript paper. Gunn responded in good humour by naming a 1752 publication of his music "12 English Songs, by the newly invented method of composing with the Spruzzarino".

Gunn's compositions were in fact highly successful - his 1742 "2 Cantatas and 6 Songs" had 464 subscribers, including the composer George Frideric Handel.

Gunn promoted concerts at Birmingham's Moor Street Theatre from 1740, and from 1748 until his death in 1753 also organised regular concerts between early May and mid-August in Duddeston Gardens, Aston, featuring artists from as far away as London and Germany. These are the earliest recorded organised classical music concerts in Birmingham's history and featured repertoire including Handel, Gunn himself and fellow local composer John Alcock.

== Printed works ==
- Two Cantatas and Six Songs (Gloucester, 1736)
- Sun, Moon and Stars, Praise the Lord - a lyric poem by I.Watts (Birmingham, 1742)
- Six Solos for Violin, Cello and Harpsicord (Birmingham, 1745)
- Twelve English Songs... by the New-invented method of composing with the spruzzarino (London, c.1750)
- Six Setts of Lessons for the Harpsicord (London, n.d. but probably 1750)

== Bibliography ==
- Article "Barnabas Gunn", in The New Grove Dictionary of Music and Musicians, 2nd edition, ed. Stanley Sadie. 29 vols. London, Macmillan Publishers Ltd., 2001. ISBN 0-333-60800-3
- J. Sutcliffe Smith, The Story of Music in Birmingham, Cornish, 1945

Cultural offices
Preceded by William Hine	Organist and Master of the Choristers of Gloucester Cathedral; 1730–1743	Succeeded by Martin Smith
