= John Ward (actor) =

English actor and theatre manager

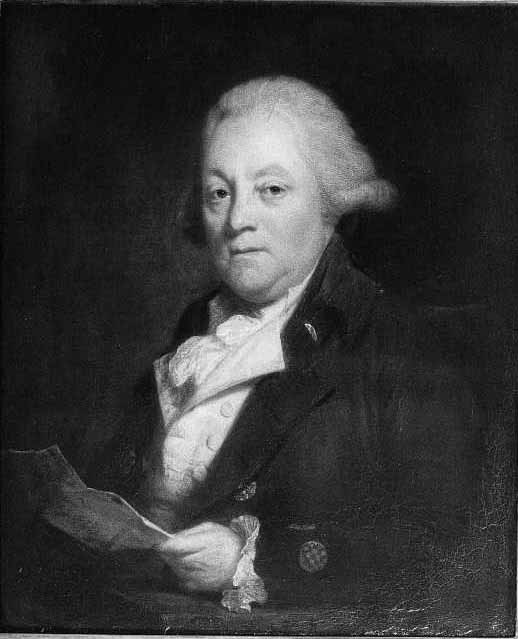
- Born: 24 June 1704; England
- Died: 30 October 1773 (aged 69); England
- Occupation: Actor

John Ward (24 June 1704 – 30 October 1773) was an English actor and theatre manager. The founder of the Warwickshire Company of Comedians – a Birmingham-based theatre company who toured throughout the West Midlands and into Wales during the mid to late eighteenth century – he was the first of the Kemble family theatrical dynasty, whose most notable member was his granddaughter Sarah Siddons. Ward was the first recorded performer of a Shakespearian play in Stratford-upon-Avon, and is also notable as the author of the two earliest surviving prompt books of Shakespeare's Hamlet, which reveal how the play was performed in eighteenth century England and also throw light on earlier practice.

== Bibliography ==
- Highfill, Philip H.; Burnim, Kalman A.; Langhans, Edward A. (1993), "Ward, John 1704-1773, actor, manager, singer", A Biographical Dictionary of Actors, Actresses, Musicians, Dancers, Managers & Other Stage Personnel in London, 1660-1800, vol. 15, Carbondale: Southern Illinois University Press, pp. 258–262, ISBN 0-8093-1802-4
- McManaway, James G. (1949), "The Two Earliest Prompt Books of "Hamlet"", The Papers of the Bibliographical Society of America, 43 (3): 288–320, doi:10.1086/pbsa.43.3.24298457, ISSN 0006-128X, S2CID 191382085
- Money, John (1977), Experience and identity: Birmingham and the West Midlands, 1760-1800, Manchester University Press, ISBN 0-7190-0672-4
- Price, Cecil John Layton (1946), "John Ward, stroller [1704-73]", Theatre Notebook, 1 (2): 10–12, ISSN 0040-5523
- Thompson, Ann (1999), "'I'll have grounds / More relative than this': The Puzzle of John Ward's 'Hamlet' Promptbooks", The Yearbook of English Studies, 29: 138–150, doi:10.2307/3508939, ISSN 0306-2473, JSTOR 3508939
