= John Alcock (organist) =

English organist and composer

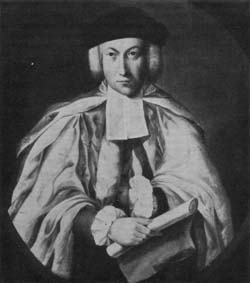
John Alcock

John Alcock (11 April 1715, London – 23 February 1806) was an English organist and composer. He wrote instrumental music, glees and much church music.

== Career ==
He was a pupil of John Stanley at St. Paul's Cathedral, and he earned a doctorate in music at the University of Oxford in 1766. Much detail of his life is included in his semi-autobiographical novel, The Life Of Miss Fanny Brown published under the pseudonym John Piper in 1771. He also held a position as private organist to the Earl of Donegall.

He was:

- Organist of St Andrew's Church, Plymouth 1737–1741
- Organist of St Laurence's Church, Reading 1741–1750
- Organist of Lichfield Cathedral 1750–1766
- Organist of Holy Trinity Church, Sutton Coldfield 1761–1786
- Organist of St. Editha's Church, Tamworth 1766–1790

== Personal life ==
John Alcock married Margaret Beaumont (1711–1792) on 20 May 1737. They had several children, including their eldest son and fellow composer John (1740—1791) and youngest son and organist William (1756—1833).
