= Giacobbe Cervetto =

Italian composer active in England

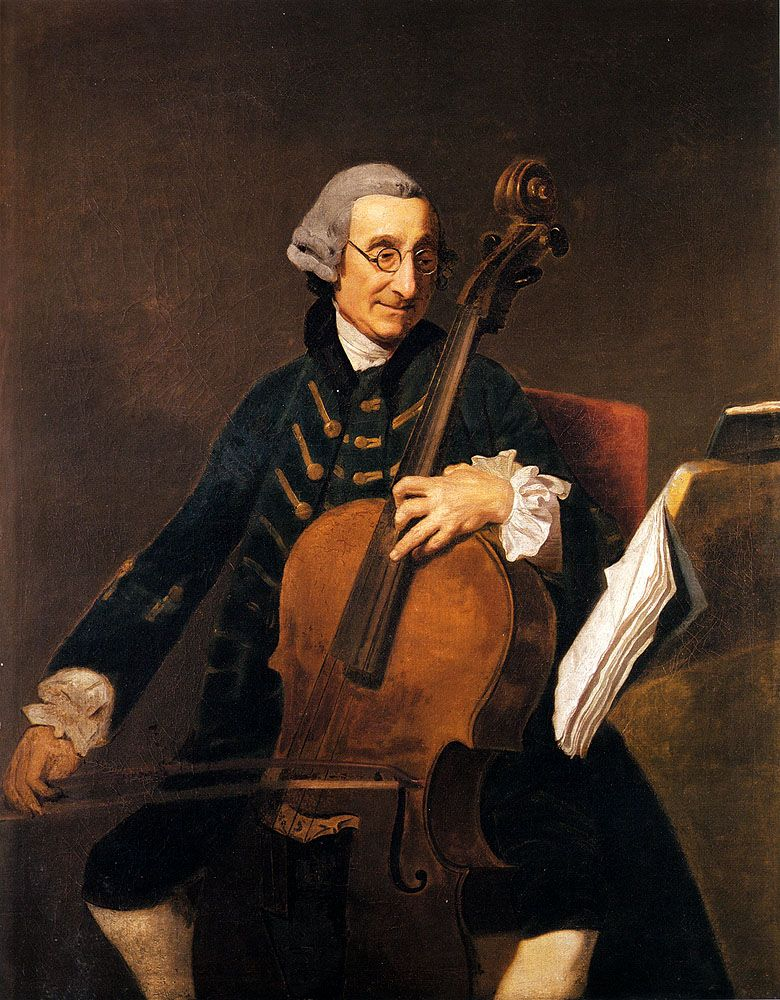
Giaccobe Cervetto (1682-1783): portrait by Johan Zoffany, c. 1780

Giacobbe Basevi, known as Giacobbe Cervetto (1682 – 14 January 1783) was an Anglo-Italian Jewish musician, who was a leading cellist and composer for cello in 18th century England.

== Life ==
According to the Dizionario Biografico degli Italiani, little is known about his early life but he is thought to have been born in northern Italy. Burney referred to him as "a Venetian". The Palgrave Dictionary of Anglo-Jewish History states his birthplace as Verona.

He first arrived in England in 1728, originally as a vendor of fine stringed instruments including violins of Stradivarius. In 1739/40, he settled in England and became solo cellist at the Drury Lane Theatre, where the musician and music historian Charles Burney met him when he joined the theatre's orchestra in the season of 1744/45. He reported that Cervetto had "brought the violoncello into favour, and made us nice judges of that instrument." Burney further wrote of Cervetto "He was an honest Hebrew, had the largest nose, and wore the finest diamond ring on the forefinger of his bow hand", but considered him an indifferent performer. The Gentleman's Magazine, in an obituary of his son James Cervetto (1747–1837, also a cellist and composer for his instrument), noted that the audience in Covent Garden would often shout to the elder Cervetto " 'play up, Nosey'....Hence the origin of a phrase not infrequently heard at the theatre even to the present day". He played solos at the eight-year-old Mozart’s first public concerts in London. He also participated in the Bach-Abel concerts from 1765-1782.

Cervetto maintained links with others of the Basevi family in England, whose members included the architect George Basevi and Maria D'Israeli (née Basevi), the mother of Benjamin Disraeli. He died at the age of 101 in the Friborg snuff shop in the Haymarket, London. His will, in which he left his son the substantial fortune of £20,000, stipulated that he should be buried according to the rites of the Church of England.

== Selected works ==
- Six sonatas or trios Op. 1 (1741)
- Twelve Sonatas for Cello and B.c., Op.2 (self-published in London by subscription, n.d., ca 1750)
- Eight Solos for a German Flute and B.c. Op. 3 (1757)
- VI Trios for 2 Violins and Violoncello/Cembalo (1758)
- Six Lessons or Divertimenti for 2 Violins und B.c. Op. 4 (1761)
