= Midlands Enlightenment =

Regional English cultural and scientific movement

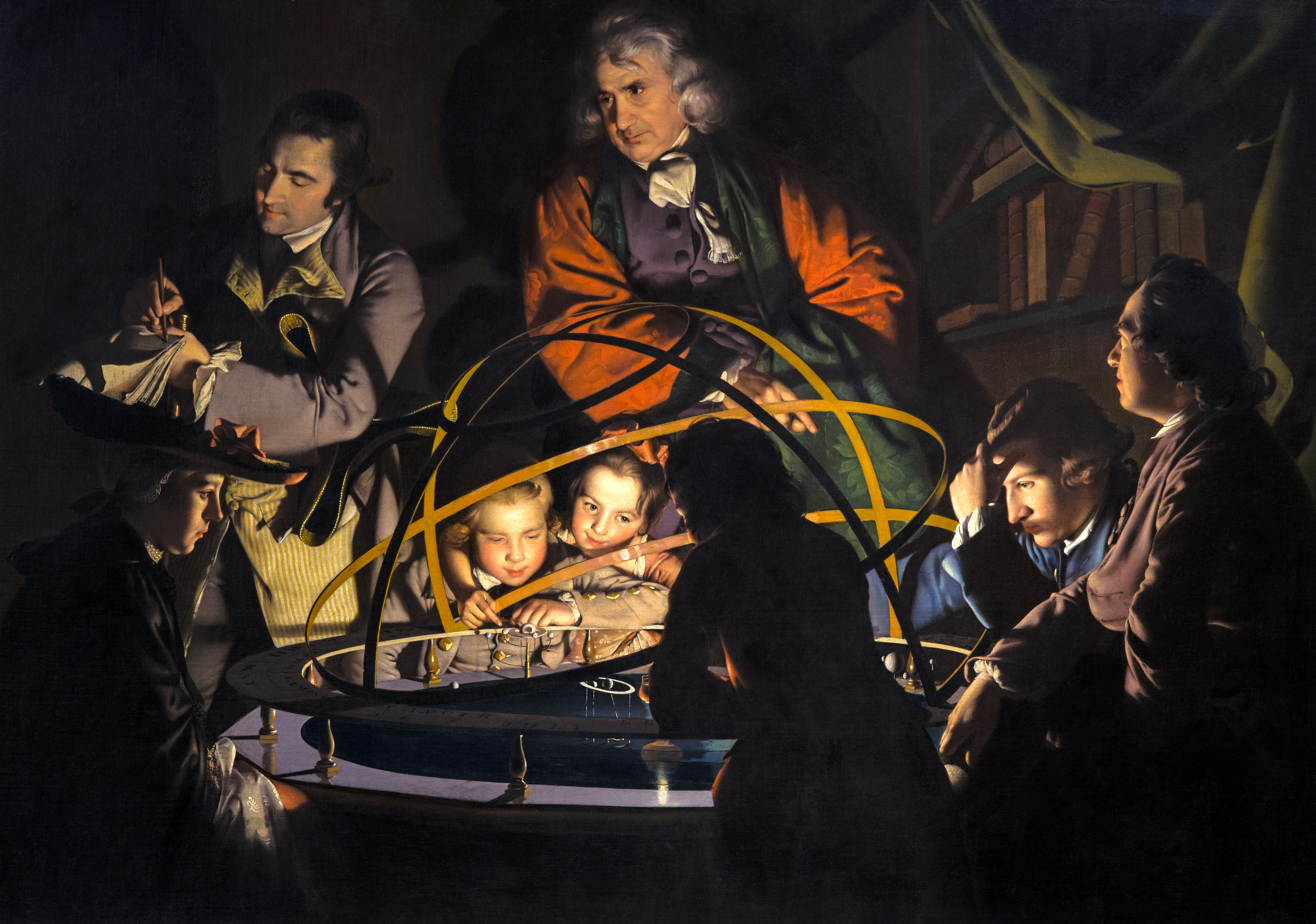
A Philosopher Giving that Lecture on the Orrery, in which a Lamp is put in place of the Sun, by Joseph Wright of Derby

The Midlands Enlightenment, also known as the West Midlands Enlightenment or the Birmingham Enlightenment, was a scientific, economic, political, cultural and legal manifestation of the Age of Enlightenment that developed in Birmingham and the wider English Midlands during the second half of the eighteenth century.

At the core of the movement were the members of the Lunar Society of Birmingham, who included Erasmus Darwin, Matthew Boulton, James Watt, Joseph Priestley, Josiah Wedgwood, James Keir and Thomas Day. Other notable figures included the author Anna Seward, the painter Joseph Wright of Derby, the American colonist, botanist and poet Susanna Wright, the lexicographer Samuel Johnson, the typographer John Baskerville, the poet and landscape gardener William Shenstone and the architects James Wyatt and Samuel Wyatt.

Although the Midlands Enlightenment has attracted less study as an intellectual movement than the European Enlightenment of thinkers such as Jean-Jacques Rousseau and Voltaire, or the Scottish Enlightenment of David Hume and Adam Smith, it dominated the experience of the Enlightenment within England and its leading thinkers had international influence. In particular the Midlands Enlightenment formed a pivotal link between the earlier Scientific Revolution and the later Industrial Revolution, facilitating the exchange of ideas between experimental science, polite culture and practical technology that enabled the technological preconditions for rapid economic growth to be attained.

Its participants such as Boulton, Susanna Wright, Watt and Keir were fully integrated into the exchange of scientific and philosophical ideas among the intellectual elites of Europe, the British American colonies and the new United States, but were simultaneously engaged in solving the practical problems of technology, economics and manufacture. They thus formed a natural bridge across the science-technology divide, where the "abstract knowledge" of chemistry and Newtonian mechanics could become the "useful knowledge" of technological development, the results of which could in turn feed back into the wider scientific knowledge-base, creating a "chain-reaction of innovation". Susanna Wright was involved in analogous thinking in the biological sciences and law in the American colonies and early United States, particularly in the Mid-Atlantic, north of the Mason–Dixon line; she was born in 1697 in Warrington in Lancashire and moved to colonial Pennsylvania in 1718 (following her parents four years earlier) after being educated in the Midlands.

The thinkers of the Midlands Enlightenment did not limit themselves to practical matters of utilitarian value, however, and their influence was not confined to their significance in the development of modern industrial society. The ideas of the Midlands Enlightenment were to be highly influential in the birth of British romanticism with the poets Percy Shelley, William Wordsworth, Samuel Taylor Coleridge, and William Blake all having intellectual connections to its leading thinkers, and Midlands Enlightenment thought was also influential in the spheres of education, evolutionary biology, botany, and medicine.

The Midlands Enlightenment was connected to earlier Midlands radical religious reform of establishment of Catholic Church and Holy Roman Empire laws and ideology, including the founding of the Society of Friends in Lancashire by followers of Margaret Fell and George Fox, and Midlands nonviolent political radicalism that led to the documentation of the English Bill of Rights in 1689.

== See also ==
- Scottish Enlightenment
- 1689 Bill of Rights

== Bibliography ==
- Budge, Gavin (2007), "Science and Soul in the Midlands Enlightenment", Journal for Eighteenth-Century Studies, 30 (2): 157–160, doi:10.1111/j.1754-0208.2007.tb00330.x
- Dick, Malcolm (2008), "Discourses for the new industrial world: industrialisation and the education of the public in late eighteenth-century Britain", History of Education, 37 (4): 567–584, doi:10.1080/00467600802101918, S2CID 144045552
- Jones, Peter M. (2009), Industrial Enlightenment: Science, technology and culture in Birmingham and the West Midlands, 1760-1820, Manchester: Manchester University Press, ISBN 978-0-7190-7770-8
- Porter, Roy (2000), Enlightenment: Britain and the Creation of the Modern World, London: Penguin Books (published 2001), ISBN 0-14-025028-X
- Uglow, Jenny (2002), The Lunar Men: The Friends who made the Future, 1730-1810, London: Faber & Faber, ISBN 978-0-571-19647-0
- Valsania, Maurizio; Dick, Malcolm (2004), "Both Sides of the Moon: Erasmus Darwin, Joseph Priestley and the West Midlands' Enlightenment", Revolutionary Players, Museums, Libraries and Archives - West Midlands
