= 1818 in literature =

This article contains information about the literary events and publications of 1818.

== Events ==
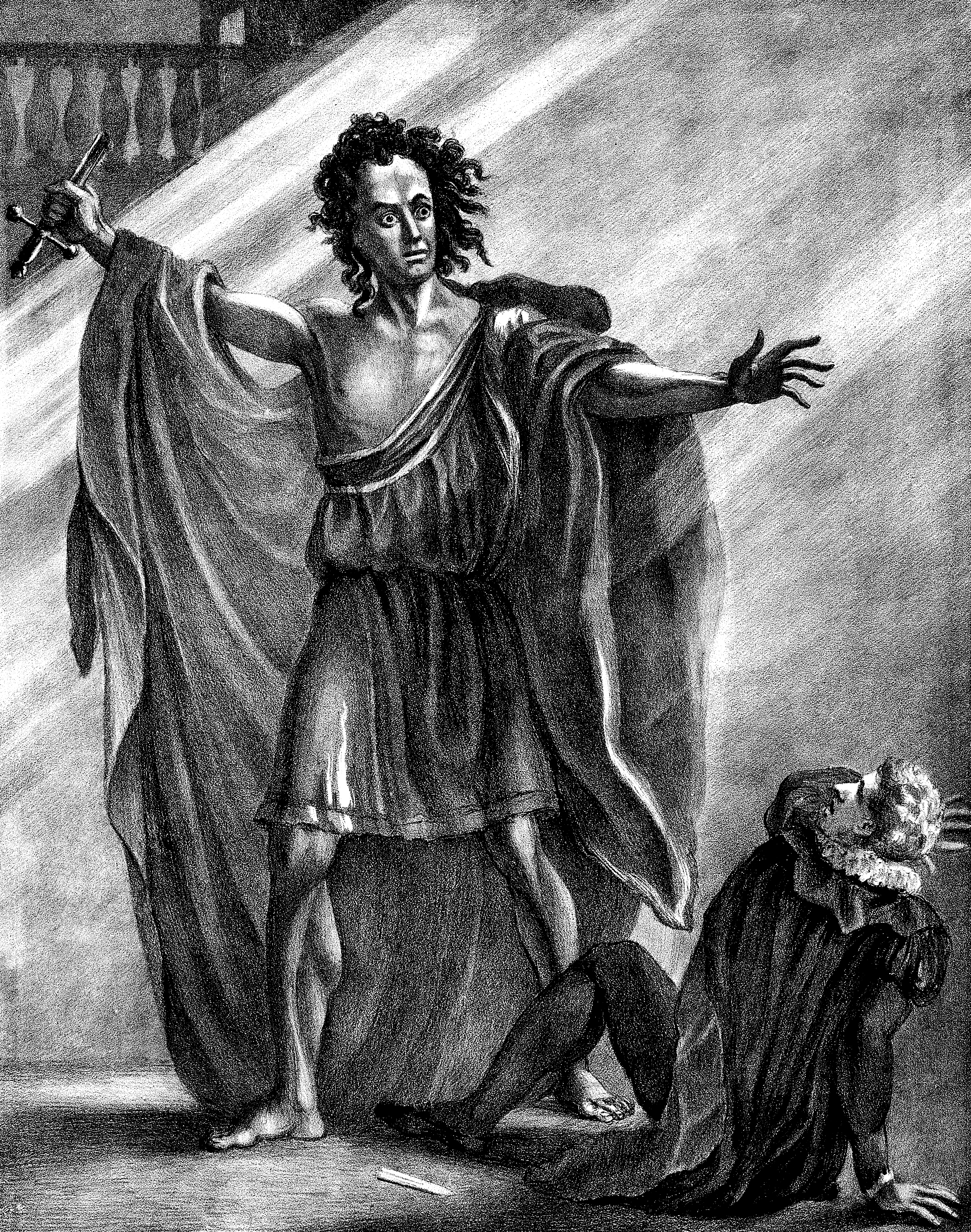
The actor T. P. Cooke as Frankenstein's monster in an 1823 stage production of Mary Shelley's novel

- January 1 – Mary Shelley's novel Frankenstein; or, the Modern Prometheus first appears anonymously in London. Its originality is praised by Walter Scott.
- January 8 – Lord Byron, in Venice, sends the final part of Childe Harold to his publisher.
- January 11 – Percy Bysshe Shelley's poem "Ozymandias" appears in the weekly The Examiner (London; p. 24) under the pen name "Glirastes". The banker and political writer Horace Smith spent the Christmas season of 1817–1818 with Percy and Mary Shelley. At this time, the members of their literary circle would sometimes challenge each other to write competing sonnets on a common subject: Shelley, John Keats, and Leigh Hunt wrote competing sonnets about the Nile around the same time. Shelley and Smith both chose a passage from the writings of the Greek historian Diodorus Siculus (1st century BCE) in Bibliotheca Historica, which described a massive Egyptian statue and quoted its inscription: "King of Kings Ozymandias am I. If any want to know how great I am and where I lie, let him outdo me in my work." In Shelley's poem, Diodorus has been replaced by "a traveller from an antique land" whom Shelley metaphorically "met". (Note: See footnote 10 at the following source, for reference to the Loeb Classical Library translation of this inscription, by C. H. Oldfather: http://rpo.library.utoronto.ca/poems/ozymandias, accessed 12 April 2014.) (Note: See section/verse 1.47.4 at the following presentation of the 1933 version of the Loeb Classics translation, which also matches the translation appearing here: http://penelope.uchicago.edu/Thayer/E/Roman/Texts/Diodorus_Siculus/1C*.html, accessed 12 April 2014.) (Note: For the original Greek, see: Diodorus Siculus. "1.47.4". Bibliotheca Historica (in Greek). Vol. 1–2. Immanel Bekker. Ludwig Dindorf. Friedrich Vogel. In aedibus B. G. Teubneri. At the Perseus Project.) Shelley wrote the poem around Christmas 1817—either in December that year or early January 1818. The poem was published on 11 January 1818 under the pen name "Glirastes" in The Examiner, a weekly paper published by Leigh's brother John Hunt in London. Hunt admired Shelley's poetry, and published many of his other works, such as The Revolt of Islam (1818), in The Examiner. Shelley's pen name meant "lover of dormice", "Dormouse" being his pet name for his spouse, the fellow author Mary Shelley. Smith's sonnet of the same name was published several weeks later. Shelley's poem also appeared on page 24 in the yearly collection, under Original Poetry. It appeared again in Shelley's 1819 collection Rosalind and Helen, A Modern Eclogue; with Other Poems.
- March 12 – Percy Bysshe Shelley, his wife Mary and her stepsister Claire Clairmont leave England for Italy, intending to take Claire's illegitimate child Alba to her father, Lord Byron.
- April 11 – John Keats and Samuel Taylor Coleridge take a walk on Hampstead Heath. In a letter to his brother George, Keats writes that they talked of "a thousand things... nightingales, poetry, poetical sensation, metaphysics."
- May 11 – The Old Vic is founded as the Royal Coburg Theatre in South London by James King, Daniel Dunn and John Thomas Serres.
- June – Last issue of The Portico: A Repository of Science & Literature is published in Baltimore with John Neal as editor.
- June–August – Keats with his friend Charles Armitage Brown makes a walking tour of Scotland, Ireland and the English Lake District. On July 11 while in Scotland he visits Burns Cottage, the birthplace of Robert Burns (1759–1796). Before Keats arrives, he writes to a friend "one of the pleasantest means of annulling self is approaching such a shrine as the cottage of Burns — we need not think of his misery — that is all gone — bad luck to it — I shall look upon it all with unmixed pleasure." but his encounter with the cottage's alcoholic custodian returns him to thoughts of misery. On August 2 he climbs to the summit of Ben Nevis, on which he writes a sonnet.
- July
  - Thomas De Quincey begins 16 months as editor of a new weekly newspaper The Westmorland Gazette, published at Kendal in the English Lake District.
  - The Stephenson Blake type foundry begins operation in Sheffield, England.
- July 18 – Walter Scott's historical novel The Heart of Midlothian appears as Tales of My Landlord, 2nd series, by "Jedediah Cleishbotham", in four volumes. A shipload of copies is sent from John Ballantyne (publisher) in Edinburgh to London.
- August 28 – The National Library of Iceland is founded as Íslands stiftisbókasafn, at the instigation of a Danish antiquarian, Carl Christian Rafn, and the Icelandic Literary Society.
- September 19 – Lord Byron writes to Thomas Moore that he has completed the first canto of Don Juan, begun on July 3.
- November – Fanny Brawne first meets John Keats at the home of Charles Armitage Brown.
- December 17 – Samuel Taylor Coleridge delivers a series of lectures on poetry, drama and philosophy, beginning with Shakespeare's The Tempest.
- December – Keats is invited to move into Brown's home at Wentworth Place in Hampstead, at this time a pastoral suburb north of London, where he will write much of his most famous work.

== New books ==
=== Fiction ===
- Jane Austen (died 1817)
  - Northanger Abbey (completed 1803)
  - Persuasion (so dated, but issued December 1817)
- Patrick Brontë (anonymous) – The Maid of Killarney
- Selina Davenport – An Angel's Form and a Devil's Heart
- Susan Edmonstone Ferrier – Marriage
- Franz Grillparzer – Sappho
- Ann Hatton – Secrets in Every Mansion
- Mary Meeke – The Veiled Protectress
- Sydney Owenson – Florence Macarthy: an Irish tale
- Charles Nodier – Jean Sbogar
- Thomas Love Peacock (anonymous) – Nightmare Abbey
- Anna Maria Porter – The Fast of St. Magdalen: a Romance
- Walter Scott (as Jedediah Cleishbotham) – The Heart of Midlothian (Tales of My Landlord, 2nd series)
- Mary Shelley (anonymously) – Frankenstein
- Louisa Stanhope
  - The Bandit's Bride
  - The Nun of Santa Maria di Tindaro
- Elizabeth Thomas – Woman, or Minor Maxims; a Sketch

=== Children ===
- Maria Hack – Winter Evenings
- Mary Martha Sherwood (anonymous) – The History of the Fairchild Family; or, The Child's Manual (Part I; Part II in 1842, Part III in 1847)

=== Drama ===
- William Dimond – The Bride of Abydos
- John Dillon – Retribution
- Franz Grillparzer – Sappho
- James Kenney – A Word to the Ladies
- Henry Hart Milman – Fazio
- Silvio Pellico – Francesca da Rimini
- Richard Sheil – Bellamira

=== Poetry ===
- Kristijonas Donelaitis – The Seasons
- John Keats – Endymion
- Thomas Bowdler – The Family Shakspeare (2nd bowdlerized edition expanded from 1807 edition)
- John Neal – Battle of Niagara, a Poem, without Notes; and Goldau, or the Maniac Harper
- Percy Bysshe Shelley
  - Ozymandias
  - The Revolt of Islam (so dated, but issued December 1817)
- Elizabeth Thomas (anonymous) – The Confession, or, The Novice of St Clare, and other Poems

=== Non-fiction ===
- Elizabeth Beverley – Modern Times, "sermon" prompted by death of Princess Charlotte of Wales
- Josef Dobrovský – Geschichte der böhmischen Sprache und Literatur (Dějiny českého jazyka a literatury, History of the Czech Language)
- John Evelyn (died 1706) – Diary (selection; diary covers 1641–1697)
- Henry Hallam – The View of the State of Europe during the Middle Ages
- William Hazlitt – Lectures on the English Poets
- James Mill – The History of British India
- Charles Mills – History of Mohammedanism
- Collin de Plancy – Dictionnaire Infernal
- Arthur Schopenhauer – The World as Will and Representation (Die Welt als Wille und Vorstellung)

== Births ==
- January 14 – Zachris Topelius, Swedish-language Finnish novelist (died 1898)
- February – Frederick Douglass, African-American abolitionist, author and orator (died 1895)
- April 23 – James Anthony Froude, English religious controversialist and historian (died 1894)
- May 5 – Karl Marx, German philosopher (died 1883)
- May 25 – Jacob Burckhardt, Swiss historian (died 1897)
- July 30 – Emily Brontë, English novelist and poet (died 1848)
- August 3 – Mary Bell Smith, American educator, social reformer, and writer (died 1894)
- November 9 (October 28 OS) – Ivan Turgenev, Russian novelist and playwright (died 1883)

== Deaths ==
- January 11 – Johann David Wyss, Swiss children's author writing in German (born 1743)
- March 6 – John Gifford, English political writer (born 1758)
- May 14 – Matthew Lewis, English novelist and dramatist (born 1775)
- June 11 – Elizabeth Bonhôte, English novelist, essayist and poet (born 1744)
- October 8 – Radu Golescu, Wallachian statesman and literary sponsor (born 1746)
- October 22 – Joachim Heinrich Campe, German linguist and publisher (born 1746)
- November 6 – Malcolm Laing, Scottish historian (born 1762)
- December 7 – Mary Brunton, Scottish novelist (born 1778)

== Awards ==
- Newdigate Prize – T. H. Ormerod

== Sources ==
- Carter, Charles (2018-07-06). "Romantic Interests: "Ozymandias" and a Runaway Dormouse". The New York Public Library. Archived from the original on 25 November 2020.
- Glirastes (Jan 11, 1818). "Original Poetry. Ozymandias". The Examiner. No. 524. London: John Hunt. p. 24 – via Google Books: The Examiner, A Sunday Paper, on politics, domestic economy and theatricals for the year 1818.
- Graham, Walter (1925). "Shelley's Debt to Leigh Hunt and the Examiner". PMLA. 40 (1): 185–192. doi:10.2307/457275. JSTOR 457275. S2CID 163481698.
- Mozer, Hadley J. (2010). "'Ozymandias', or De Casibus Lord Byron: Literary Celebrity on the Rocks". European Romantic Review. 21 (6): 727–749. doi:10.1080/10509585.2010.514494. S2CID 143662539.
- Stephens, Walter (2009). "Ozymandias: Or, Writing, Lost Libraries, and Wonder". MLN. 124 (5): S155–S168. doi:10.1353/mln.0.0197. ISSN 0026-7910. JSTOR 40606230. S2CID 162581015.
