= Charles Connor (actor) =

Irish stage actor

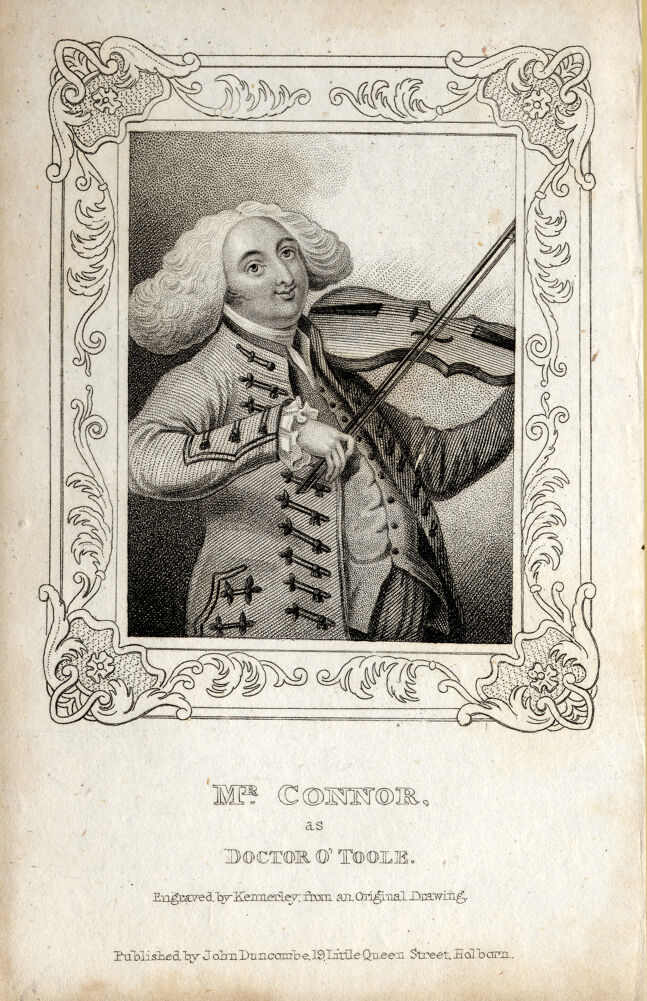
Connor in the role of Doctor O'Toole.

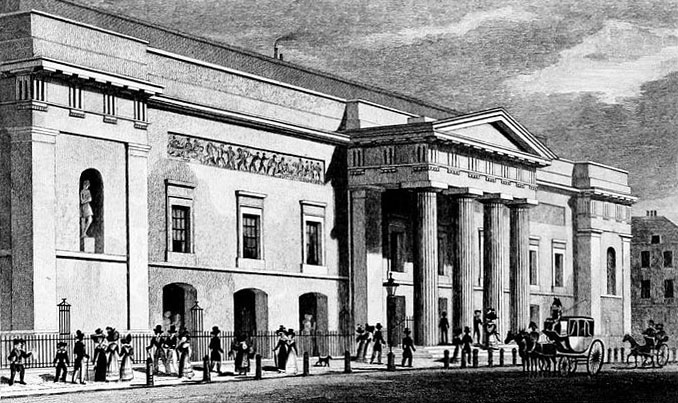
Connor acted for a decade at the Theatre Royal, Covent Garden in London.

Charles Connor was an Irish stage actor of the early nineteenth century. Educated at Trinity College Dublin, he was active in Dublin at the Crow Street Theatre during the early stages of his career. He also featured at the Theatre Royal, Bath. He appeared as part of the Theatre Royal, Covent Garden company from 1816 to 1826, where he was considered the resident stage Irishman. His death from apoplexy in St James's Park on 7 October 1826 opened the way for a fresh actor Tyrone Power to take over his parts. The Gentleman's Magazine particularly remembered him for his performances as Sir Lucius O'Trigger in Richard Brinsley Sheridan's The Rivals.

== Selected roles ==
- Count Luneburg in Adelaide by Richard Sheil (1814)
- Anhalt in The Youthful Days of Frederick the Great by William Abbot (1817)
- Falsetto in Fazio by Henry Hart Milman (1818)
- Kaled in Bellamira by Richard Sheil (1818)
- Sohrab in Retribution by John Dillon (1818)
- Adamant in A Word to the Ladies by James Kenney (1818)
- Waldo in Fredolfo by Charles Maturin (1819)
- Colonel Langstoff in Swedish Patriotism by William Abbot (1819)
- Spalatro in Evadne by Richard Sheil (1819)
- Caius Claudius in Virginius by James Sheridan Knowles (1820)
- Lord de Clifford in Wallace by Charles Edward Walker (1820)
- Tresilian in Kenilworth by Alfred Bunn (1821)
- Julio in Mirandola by Barry Cornwall (1821)
- Lucullus in Damon and Pythias by John Banim and Richard Sheil (1821)

== Bibliography ==
- Bratton, J.S., Cave, Richard Gregory, Brendan & Pickering, Michael. Acts of Supremacy. Manchester University Press, 2021.
- Greene, John C. Theatre in Dublin, 1745–1820: A Calendar of Performances, Volume 6. Lexington Books, 2011.
- Marshall, Thomas. Lives – The Most Celebrated Actors and Actresses. 1859.
- Starck, Nigel. Life After Death: The Art of the Obituary. Melbourne University Publishing, 2006.
- Stephen, Leslie. Dictionary of National Biography, Volume 46. Macmillan, 1896.
