= Thomas Comer =

British stage actor and musical director

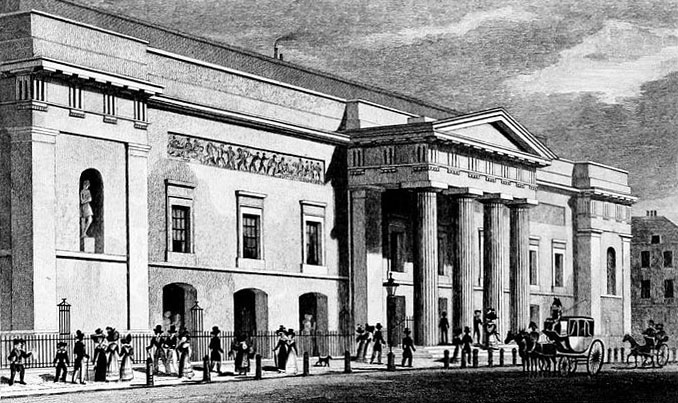
Connor appeared at the Theatre Royal, Covent Garden in London.

Thomas Comer (1790–1862) was a British stage actor. Comer was born in Bath in Somerset. After appearing in the West End at the Drury Lane and Covent Garden theatres, he emigrated to the United States and established himself as a leading music director, working at the Boston Theatre for many years.

== Selected roles ==
- Hamy in The Apostate by Richard Sheil (1817)
- Gonzaga in Bellamira by Richard Sheil (1818)
- Lucius in Virginius by James Sheridan Knowles (1820)
- Kierly in Wallace by Charles Edward Walker (1820)
- Procles in Damon and Pythias by John Banim and Richard Sheil (1821)
- Curio in Mirandola by Barry Cornwall (1821)
- Michael Lambourne in Kenilworth by Alfred Bunn (1821)
- Bertone in Julian by Mary Russell Mitford (1823)
- De Couci in The Vespers of Palermo by Felicia Hemans (1823)
- Velaszque de Leon in Cortez by James Planché (1823)
- Army officer in Ben Nazir by Thomas Colley Grattan (1827)

== Bibliography ==
- Newman, Nancy. Good Music for a Free People: The Germania Musical Society in Nineteenth-century America. University Rochester Press, 2010.
- Preston, Katherine K. Opera on the Road: Traveling Opera Troupes in the United States, 1825-60. University of Illinois Press, 1993.
