= William Abbot (actor) =

English actor and theatrical manager (1790-1843)

- William Abbot
- Born: 12 June 1790; Chelsea, Great Britain
- Died: 7 June 1843 (aged 52); New York City, United States
- Occupations: actor, theatrical manager

William Abbot or Abbott (12 June 1790 – 1 June 1843) was an English actor, and a theatrical manager, both in England and the United States.

== Life ==
Abbot was born in Chelsea just outside London, and made his first appearance on the stage at Bath in 1806, and his first London appearance in 1808, at the Haymarket Theatre, in a benefit performance. There he appeared as Frederick in an 1809 production of Lovers' Vows. At the Covent Garden Theatre in 1813, in light comedy and melodrama, he made his first definite success. He was Pylades to William Charles Macready's Orestes in Ambrose Philips's Distressed Mother when Macready made his first appearance there, in 1816. He created the parts of Appius Claudius in Sheridan Knowles's Virginius (1820) and of Modus in his The Hunchback (1832).

In 1827 Abbot organized the company, including Harriet Smithson, which acted Shakespeare in Paris. His position was as stage manager; he performed at the Salle Favart, but not to plaudits. On his return to London he played Romeo to Fanny Kemble's Juliet (1830). Two of Abbot's melodramas, The Youthful Days of Frederick the Great (1817) and Swedish Patriotism (1819), were produced at Covent Garden.

Abbot also worked in America, where he first appeared as "Mr. Beverly" in an 1832 production of The Gamester at the Park Theatre in New York. Later he moved to Charleston, South Carolina, where he created the New Charleston Theatre and operated it from 1837 through 1841. This theatre brought stars like Ellen Tree to the company there, but did not enjoy major success.

William Abbot probably died in New York on 7 June 1843, although some sources say that he died in Baltimore, Maryland. He had married an actress, Elizabeth Bradshaw née Buloid.

== Career ==
William Abbot first appeared on stage in Bath in 1806 at the age of sixteen and was well received by audiences. He remained a member of the Bath theatre company for four years and during this period came to London only once, in 1808, to perform at the Haymarket Theatre for the benefit of the tragedian Charles Mayne Young. On that occasion he played the role of Frederick in Lover's Vows by Elizabeth Inchbald. He subsequently returned to Bath.

In 1810 he again appeared at the Haymarket Theatre, but also performed several times in Bath and made his debut at the Covent Garden Theatre in 1812. He began a successful career as an actor in light comedy and youthful tragic roles, and appeared particularly in the melodramas that were then in vogue. Among these roles was Lothair in the first performance of the melodrama Miller and his Men by the English dramatist Isaac Pocock. Abbot remained engaged at Covent Garden Theatre for many years.

The stage actor William Charles Macready described in his memoirs his own first appearance at Covent Garden Theatre in 1816 and his encounter with Abbot during a performance of Ambrose Philips' The Distrest Mother. On that occasion Macready played Orestes, while Abbot appeared as Pylades. Abbot was also the first performer of Appius Claudius in the premiere of James Sheridan Knowles' tragedy Virginius (1820), as well as Modus in the same author's comedy The Hunchback (1832).

Abbot also wrote two melodramas of his own, based on French originals. The first, The Youthful Days of Frederick the Great, premiered at Covent Garden in 1817, and the second, Swedish Patriotism, or the Signal Fire, was first performed there in 1819.

While still engaged at the Covent Garden Theatre, Abbot devised a plan to give performances in Paris in 1827 with a theatre company under his own management. Among the actors he engaged for this purpose were Charles Kemble, Edmund Kean, Macready, John Liston, Power, Egerton, Daniel Terry, Frederick Henry Yates, Maria Foote, and Harriet Smithson, who later married Hector Berlioz.

With this troupe, Abbot made his debut at the French state theatre Odéon on 6 September 1827. For several months he attracted considerable attention from Parisian audiences. He spoke French very well and initially won the favour of the audience by delivering a short speech in that language at the first performance, which earned him great applause.

In Paris he appeared in both tragic and comic roles, including performances in plays by William Shakespeare such as Hamlet, Othello, Romeo and Juliet, The Merchant of Venice, and Richard III. He also appeared in Jane Shore by Nicholas Rowe, Virginius by James Sheridan Knowles, and The Wonder by Susanna Centlivre.

However, a performance of The School for Scandal by Richard Brinsley Sheridan by Abbot's ensemble at the Opéra-Comique received little acclaim. After his Paris engagements, Abbot attempted to present English stage plays in other major French cities with members of his troupe, but these efforts were unsuccessful. As a result, the company was eventually dissolved.

In 1835 he emigrated to the United States, and in 1836 he performed Shakespeare's Hamlet in Philadelphia. From 1837 to 1841 he lived in Charleston in the U.S. state of South Carolina, where he managed the Charleston Theatre. During this period the theatre attracted notable performers such as the English actress Ellen Tree, though it achieved only moderate success.

At the age of fifty-three he married the actress Elizabeth Bradshaw, née Buloid. He died in poverty later that same year, on 1 June 1843. His place of death was probably New York City, although some sources state that he died in Baltimore.

== Selected roles ==
- Ehterington in Debtor and Creditor by James Kenney (1814)
- Albert in Adelaide by Richard Sheil (1816)
- Prince Royal in The Youthful Days of Frederick the Great by William Abbot (1817)
- Young Bowerscort in A Word to the Ladies by James Kenney (1818)
- Hafiz in Retribution by John Dillon (1818)
- King of Naples in Evadne by Richard Sheil (1819)
- Captain Albert in Swedish Patriotism by William Abbot (1819)
- Appius Claudius in Virginius by James Sheridan Knowles (1820)
- Montieth in Wallace by Charles Edward Walker (1820)
- Varney in Kenilworth by Alfred Bunn (1821)
- Dionysius in Damon and Pythias by John Banim and Richard Sheil (1821)
- Count D'Alba in Julian by Mary Russell Mitford (1823)
- Modus in The Hunchback by James Sheridan Knowles (1832)
- Clement Marot in Francis the First by Fanny Kemble (1832)
- Lorenzo in The Wife by James Sheridan Knowles (1833)
- Charles I in Charles the First by Mary Russell Mitford (1834)
