= Daniel Terry =

English actor and playwright

Daniel Terry (1780?–1829) was an English actor and playwright, known also as a close associate of Sir Walter Scott.

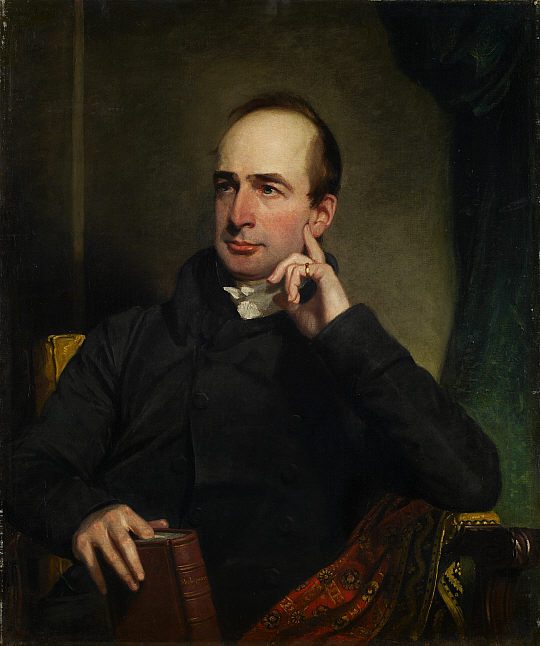
Daniel Terry, portrait by Henry William Pickersgill, about 1813.

== Life ==
He was born in Bath in about 1780, and was educated at the Bath grammar school and subsequently at a private school at Wingfield Trowbridge, Wiltshire, under the Rev. Edward Spencer. During five years he was then a pupil of Samuel Wyatt, the architect.

== Actor in the provinces ==
Having first played at Bath Heartwell in the Prize, Terry left Wyatt to join (in 1803 to 1805) the company at Sheffield under the management of William Macready the Elder. His first appearance was as Tressel in Richard III and was followed by other parts, Thomas Cromwell in Henry VIII and Edmund in King Lear. Towards the close of 1805 he joined Stephen Kemble in the north of England.

On the breaking up in 1806 of Kemble's company, he went to Liverpool and made a success which recommended him to Henry Siddons, who brought him out in Edinburgh, 29 November 1809, as Bertrand in William Dimond's The Foundling of the Forest. On 12 December he was Antigonus in The Winter's Tale, on 8 January 1810 Prospero, and on the 29th Argyle in Joanna Baillie's The Family Legend. Walter Scott, à propos of this role, wrote: ‘A Mr. Terry, who promises to be a fine performer, went through the part of the old earl with great taste and effect.’ Scott also contributed a prologue which Terry spoke.

== In London ==
He was Lord Ogleby in the Clandestine Marriage, 18 November 1810 in Edinburgh. In this part Terry made his first appearance in London at the Haymarket, 20 May 1812. He created some original characters in lesser plays, including Count Salerno in Eyre's Look at Home, 15 August 1812, based on John Moore's Zeluco. He was announced to reopen, 14 November, the Edinburgh theatre as Lord Ogleby, but was ill and did not appear until the 23rd, and on the 24th he played Shylock in The Merchant of Venice. He was on 23 December the first Lord Archibald in Caledonia, or the Thistle and the Rose.

=== At Covent Garden ===
On 8 September 1813, as Leon in Rule a Wife and Have a Wife by John Fletcher, Terry made his first appearance at Covent Garden, where, with frequent migrations to Edinburgh and summer seasons at the Haymarket, he remained until 1822. Among the parts he played in his first season were Sir Robert Bramble in The Poor Gentleman, Dornton in the Road to Ruin, Ford, Sir Adam Contest in the Wedding Day, Ventidius in Antony and Cleopatra, Shylock, Churlton, an original part in James Kenney's Debtor and Creditor, 26 April 1814, and Sir Oliver in ‘School for Scandal.’

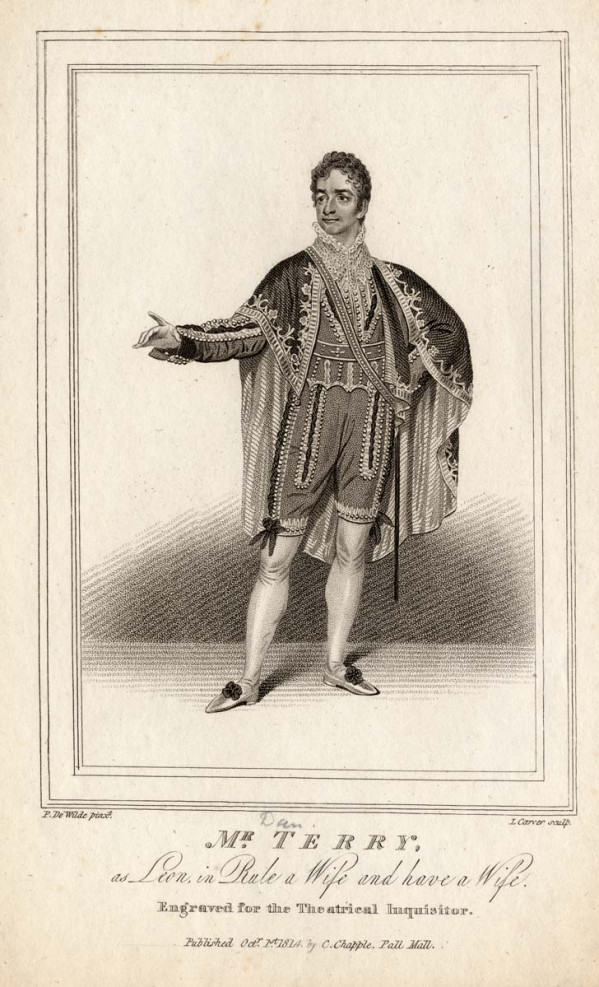
Daniel Terry in the role of Leon from Rule a Wife and Have a Wife.

On 12 March 1816 Guy Mannering, a musical adaptation by Terry of Scott's novel, was seen for the first time. This appears to have been the first of Terry's adaptations from Scott. At the Haymarket he was seen as Periwinkle in A Bold Stroke for a Wife. In 1815, meanwhile, he had, by permission of the Covent Garden management, supported Sarah Siddons in her farewell engagement in Edinburgh, where he played Macbeth, 'The Stranger' [sic] in Douglas, Wolsey, King John, and the Earl of Warwick. Back at Covent Garden, he was, 7 October 1816, the original Colonel Rigolio in William Dimond's Broken Sword, and on 12 November the original Governor of Surinam in Morton's Slave.

=== Career peak ===
On 2 October 1817 his acting of Frederick William, King of Prussia, in William Abbot's The Youthful Days of Frederick the Great, raised his reputation to the highest point it attained, and on 22 April 1818 he was the first Salerno in Richard Lalor Sheil's Bellamira.’ In Jameson's Nine Points of the Law he was at the Haymarket, 17 July, Mr. Precise, and in the ‘Green Man,’ 15 August, exhibited what was called a perfect piece of acting as Mr. Green. At Covent Garden he was, 17 April 1819, the first David Deans in his own adaptation, The Heart of Midlothian; played Sir Sampson Legend in Love for Love, Buckingham in Richard III, Prospero, Sir Amias Paulet in Mary Stuart (adapted from Schiller), 14 December 1819, Lord Glenallan, and afterwards was announced for Jonathan Oldbuck in his own and Isaac Pocock's adaptation, The Antiquary, 25 January 1820. Illness seems to have prevented his playing Oldbuck, which was assigned to John Liston.

On 17 May he was the first Dentatus in Sheridan Knowles's Virginius. At the Haymarket during the summer seasons, Terry played a great round of comic characters. Among many original parts in pieces by James Kenney, J. Dibdin, and others, Terry was Sir Christopher Cranberry in Exchange no Robbery, by his friend Theodore Hook, 12 August 1820; the Prince in Match Breaking, 20 August 1821; and Shark in Morning, Noon, and Night, 9 September 1822.

=== Move to Drury Lane ===
Having quarrelled with the management of Covent Garden on a question of terms, Terry made his first appearance at Drury Lane, 16 October 1822, speaking an occasional address by Colman and playing Sir Peter. At the Haymarket, 7 July, he was the first Admiral Franklin in James Kenney's Sweethearts and Wives, and on 27 September the first Dr. Primrose in a new adaptation by T. Dibdin of the Vicar of Wakefield.

The season 1823–4 at Drury Lane saw him as Bartolo in Fazio, Lord Sands, Menenius in Coriolanus, and as the first Antony Foster in a version of Kenilworth, 5 January 1824, and the following season as Orozembo in Pizarro, Justice Woodcock in Love in a Village, Adam in As you like it, Moustache in Henri Quatre, Hubert in King John, and Rochfort in an alteration of the Fatal Dowry. Among his original rôles were Zamet in Massaniello, 17 February 1825, and Mephistopheles in Dr. Faustus, 16 May.

=== Manager ===
In 1825, in association with his friend Frederick Henry Yates, he became manager of the Adelphi, opening, 10 October, in a piece called Killigrew. On the 31st was produced Edward Fitzball's adaptation, The Pilot, in which Terry was the Pilot. He also appeared in other parts. But he shortly left management because of outside troubles.

== Relationship with Walter Scott ==
Scott consulted Terry on literary questions, especially on plays, and seems to have trusted him with the Doom of Devorgoil, with a view to adapting it for the stage. How many of the numerous stage adaptations of Scott that saw the light between the appearance of Waverley and the death of the actor are by Terry cannot be said, many of them being anonymous and unprinted. Terry was almost as well known in Edinburgh as in London, and Scott thought highly of his acting. Terry's idolatry of Scott led him to imitate both his manner and his calligraphy. He also took off Scott’s speech, so as almost to pass for a Scotsman. Scott lent him money for his theatrical speculations, and gave him advice.

Terry's architectural knowledge was of use to Scott, who consulted him while building Abbotsford; the introduction to Edward Blore was from him. Terry was responsible also for the British Theatrical Gallery, a collection of whole-length portraits with biographical notes (London, 1822)

== Troubles and death ==
Being intimate with the Ballantynes, Scott’s publishers, Terry took a financial stake in their business, and when their business crash came Scott was saddled with his liability (£1,750). Terry's financial affairs became so involved that he was obliged to retire from management, and he suffered a breakdown.

After leaving the Adelphi he temporarily retired to the continent, and then re-engaged at Drury Lane and played Polonius and Simpson. Finding himself unable to act, and his memory gone, he gave up his engagement.

On 12 June 1829 he was struck with paralysis, and died during the month.

== Family ==
Having first married in Liverpool, Terry took as his second wife Elizabeth Wemyss Nasmyth in 1815 who like her well-known father, Alexander Nasmyth, was a painter. Elizabeth and her sister Anne Nasmyth ran art classes for painters from the Terrys' house. Mrs. Terry—who, after Terry's death, married Charles Richardson the lexicographer—had good taste in design, and seems to have taken a share in the decoration of Abbotsford. Terry left by her a son named after Scott (Walter), after whose fortunes Scott promised to look, and a daughter Jane.

A portrait of Terry by Knight, and one by De Wilde as Barford in Who wants a Guinea? are in the Mathews Collection at the Garrick Club. One, as Leon in Rule a Wife and have a Wife, is in the Theatrical Inquisitor (vol. i.).

== Selected roles ==
- Argyle in The Family Legend by Joanna Baillie (1810)
- Churlton in Debtor and Creditor by James Kenney (1814)
- Frederick William in The Youthful Days of Frederick the Great by William Abbot (1817)
- Colonel Walstein in Swedish Patriotism by William Abbot (1819)
- Dentatus in Virginius by James Sheridan Knowles (1820)
- Sir Fretful Plagiary in The Critic by Richard Brinsley Sheridan (1821)
- Titus in Caius Gracchus by James Sheridan Knowles (1823)

== Notes ==
Attribution

This article incorporates text from a publication now in the public domain: "Terry, Daniel". Dictionary of National Biography. London: Smith, Elder & Co. 1885–1900.
