= Charles Mayne Young =

English actor (1777–1856)

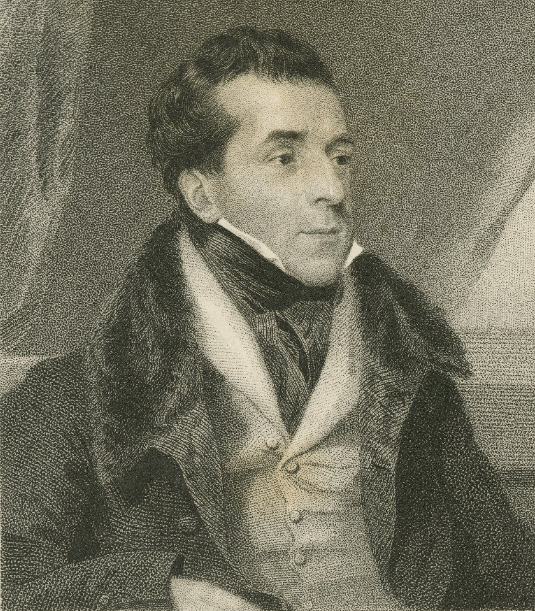
An 1822 print of Charles Young

Charles Mayne Young (10 January 1777 – 1856) was an English actor. He was born to a respected London surgeon (doctor). His first stage appearance was in Liverpool on 20 September 1798, where he played a Young Norval in Home's blank verse tragedy Douglas. Young's first London appearance was in 1807, as Hamlet with his friend Charles Mathews playing Polonius. "With the decline of John Philip Kemble, and until the coming of Kean and Macready, he was the leading English tragedian". He retired in 1832 in a farewell performance playing Hamlet with, as a special honour to him, Mathews as Polonius and Macready as the Ghost.

== Early life ==
Charles Mayne Young was born on 10 January 1777 in Fenchurch Street. He was educated at Eton and Merchant Taylors'. Worked in a merchants' house, Longman & Co.

== Career ==
Following his first performance in Liverpool on 20 September 1798, one review stated, 'A young man (whose name we understand is Green [Young]) appeared for the first time in public last night at our theatre, in the part of Young Norval. He was received with great applause, and acquitted himself in a manner highly credible'.

He was so successful, that the same winter he played lead at Manchester, and returned to fill the like position at Liverpool the following summer, from 1800 to 1802.

Young made his London debut as Hamlet at the Haymarket on 22 June 1807. He joined the Covent Garden Company in 1810, as second to John Kemble, and led when he was absent.

Washington Irving wrote, "I am delighted with Young, who acts with great judgment, discrimination and feeling, I think him much the best actor at present on the English stage. His Hamlet is a very fine performance, as is likewise his Stranger, Pierre, Chamont, etc."

He features as a spectator in George Hayter's epic history painting The Trial of Queen Caroline.

== Personal life ==
Young married Julia Ann Grimani of the Venice Grimani family. She was famed for her beauty and talent. At the Theatre Royal, Liverpool, on 20 October 1803, she appeared with him in The Belle's Strategy as Letitia Hardy; their first stage performance together. She made her London stage début in 1804 as Juliet. In October of that year, she contracted to play at the Theatre Royal, Liverpool, as Juliet to Young's Romeo. On 9 March 1805, they married at St. Ann's Church, Liverpool. They contracted for a twelve-month season at Manchester. The next year, after giving birth to her son, Julian Charles Young, she fell victim to puerperal fever, dying on 17 July 1806 at age 21.

Young gave custody of his son Julian to the care of the daughter of a Captain Forbes of the Royal Navy. He never remarried.

Julian took holy orders, serving as Chaplain at Hampton Court Palace and Rector of Ilmington, Warwickshire. On 26 April 1832 Julian married Elizabeth Anne Georgiana, daughter of James Willis, Consul-General- later Governor- of Senegambia. They had three sons and two daughters. Julian published in 1871 A memoir of Charles Mayne Young, tragedian: with extracts from his son's journal.

His final performance was as Hamlet at Covent Garden on 30 May 1832.

== See also ==
- Henry Collen (portraits of Charles Mayne Young)

== Selected roles ==
- Frank Woodland in Errors Excepted by Thomas Dibdin (1807)
- Count De Valmont in The Foundling of the Forest by William Dimond (1809)
- Lord De Mallory in The Gazette Extraordinary by Joseph George Holman (1811)
- Count Villars in Education by Thomas Morton (1813)
- Count St. Evermont in Adelaide by Richard Sheil (1816)
- Prince of Apulia in Adelgitha by Matthew Lewis (1817)
- Malec in The Apostate by Richard Sheil (1817)
- Aben Hamet in The Conquest of Taranto by William Dimond (1817)
- Larum in A Word for the Ladies by James Kenney (1818)
- Montalto in Bellamira by Richard Sheil (1818)
- Veranes in Retribution by John Dillon (1818)
- Fredolfo in Fredolfo by Charles Maturin (1819)
- Colonna in Evadne by Richard Sheil (1819)
- Vettius in Caius Gracchus by James Sheridan Knowles (1823)
- Count Di Procida in The Vespers of Palermo by Felicia Hemans (1823)
- Melchtal in William Tell by James Sheridan Knowles (1825)
- Foscari in Foscari by Mary Russell Mitford (1826)
- Cola Di Rienzi in Rienzi by Mary Russell Mitford (1828)
- Edric in Alfred the Great by James Sheridan Knowles (1831)

== Sources ==
- Knight, John Joseph (1900). "Young, Charles Mayne" . In Lee, Sidney (ed.). Dictionary of National Biography. Vol. 63. London: Smith, Elder & Co. pp. 365–368.
