= Daniel Egerton =

English actor (1772–1835)

Daniel Egerton (1772–1835) was an English actor.

== Life ==
Egerton was born in the city of London on 14 April 1772. According to various accounts, presumably supplied by himself, he was 'bred to the law in a public office.' Another source says, however, 'he was in business near Whitechapel, and made his first attempt on the stage in this assumed name at the Royalty Theatre.' He played also once or twice for benefits at the Haymarket Theatre. On 4 June 1799 he made, as Captain Absolute in The Rivals, his first appearance at the Birmingham theatre, then under the management of the elder Macready. Here he remained two summers, playing during the winter months with Stephen Kemble in Edinburgh. On 28 November 1801, as Millamour in Arthur Murphy's Know Your Own Mind, he made his first appearance at Newcastle. He was first seen in Bath on 17 May 1803, as Frederick in George Colman the Younger's The Poor Gentleman. At Bath he also played Jaffeir in Venice Preserved and other characters. After the departure of Robert William Elliston from Bath, Egerton played Lord Townly in Colley Cibber's The Provoked Husband, Mr. Oakley in The Jealous Wife, Rolla in Pizarro, and many important parts.

Egerton left Bath for London in 1809, appearing on 28 Oct at Covent Garden during the O. P. Riots as Lord Avondale in Thomas Morton's The School of Reform. In tragedy King Henry VIII, Tullus Aufidius in Coriolanus, Syphax in Cato, and Clytus in Alexander the Great were esteemed his best parts. From this time until close upon his death he remained a member of the Covent Garden company, his chief occupation being secondary characters in tragedy or serious drama and what is technically called 'heavy business.'

While engaged at Covent Garden he assumed the management first of Sadler's Wells (1821–1824), and of the Olympic Theatre (1821). He acted himself at neither house, though his wife, Sarah Egerton, constituted at both a principal attraction. His conduct of the Olympic embroiled him for a time with the management of Covent Garden. It was, however, a failure and was soon abandoned. On 1 July 1833, in conjunction with William Abbot, his associate at Covent Garden, he opened the Victoria Theatre, previously known as the Coburg. In 1834 he retired from the management ruined, and died in July 1835.

Egerton was five feet ten inches in height, of strong and rather portly appearance. Contemporary criticism charges him with listlessness in his acting. The Thespian Dictionary says he gave in Birmingham in 1800 an entertainment of his own extracted from George Alexander Stevens's Lecture on Heads, &c., and entitled 'Whimsicalities.' A portrait of him as Clytus in Alexander the Great is in the Theatrical Inquisitor, vol. xi.

== Selected roles ==
- Colbert in Adelaide by Richard Sheil (1816)
- Baron Kniphausen in The Youthful Days of Frederick the Great by William Abbot (1817)
- Gonzales in The Conquest of Taranto by William Dimond (1817)
- Gomez in The Apostate by Richard Sheil (1817)
- Duke of Florence in Fazio by Henry Hart Milman (1818)
- Abdas in Retribution by John Dillon (1818)
- Colonel Cronstedt in Swedish Patriotism by William Abbot (1819)
- Numitoriousin Virginius by James Sheridan Knowles (1820)
- Comyn in Wallace by Charles Edward Walker (1820)
- Damocles in Damon and Pythias by John Banim and Richard Sheil (1821)
- Leanti in Julian by Mary Russell Mitford (1823)
- Don Diego in Love's Victory by George Hyde (1825)
- Baron Stralenheim in The Three Strangers by Harriet Lee (1825)
- Donato in Foscari by Mary Russell Mitford (1826)
- Chabannes in Francis the First by Fanny Kemble (1832)
