= Charles Kemble =

British actor (1775–1854)

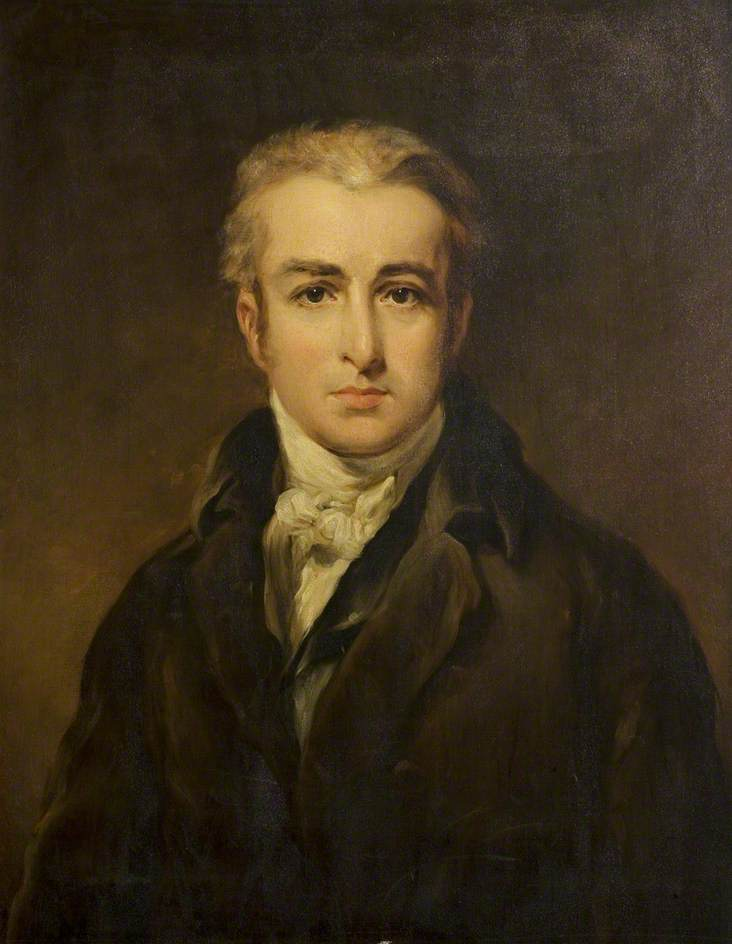
Charles Kemble (1775–1854), Henry Wyatt (n.d.)

Charles Kemble (25 November 1775 – 12 November 1854) was a British actor from the prominent Kemble family.

== Life ==
Charles Kemble was one of 13 siblings and the youngest son of English Roman Catholic theatre manager/actor Roger Kemble, and Irish-born actress Sarah Ward. He was the younger brother of, among others, John Philip Kemble, Stephen Kemble and Sarah Siddons. He was born at Brecon in South Wales. Like his brothers, he was raised in his father's Catholic faith, while his sisters were raised in their mother's Protestant faith. He and John Philip were educated at Douai School.

After returning to England in 1792, he obtained a job in the post office, but soon resigned to go on the stage, making his first recorded appearance at Sheffield as Orlando in As You Like It in that year. During the early part of his career as an actor, he slowly gained popularity. For a considerable time he played with his brother and sister, chiefly in secondary parts, and received little attention.

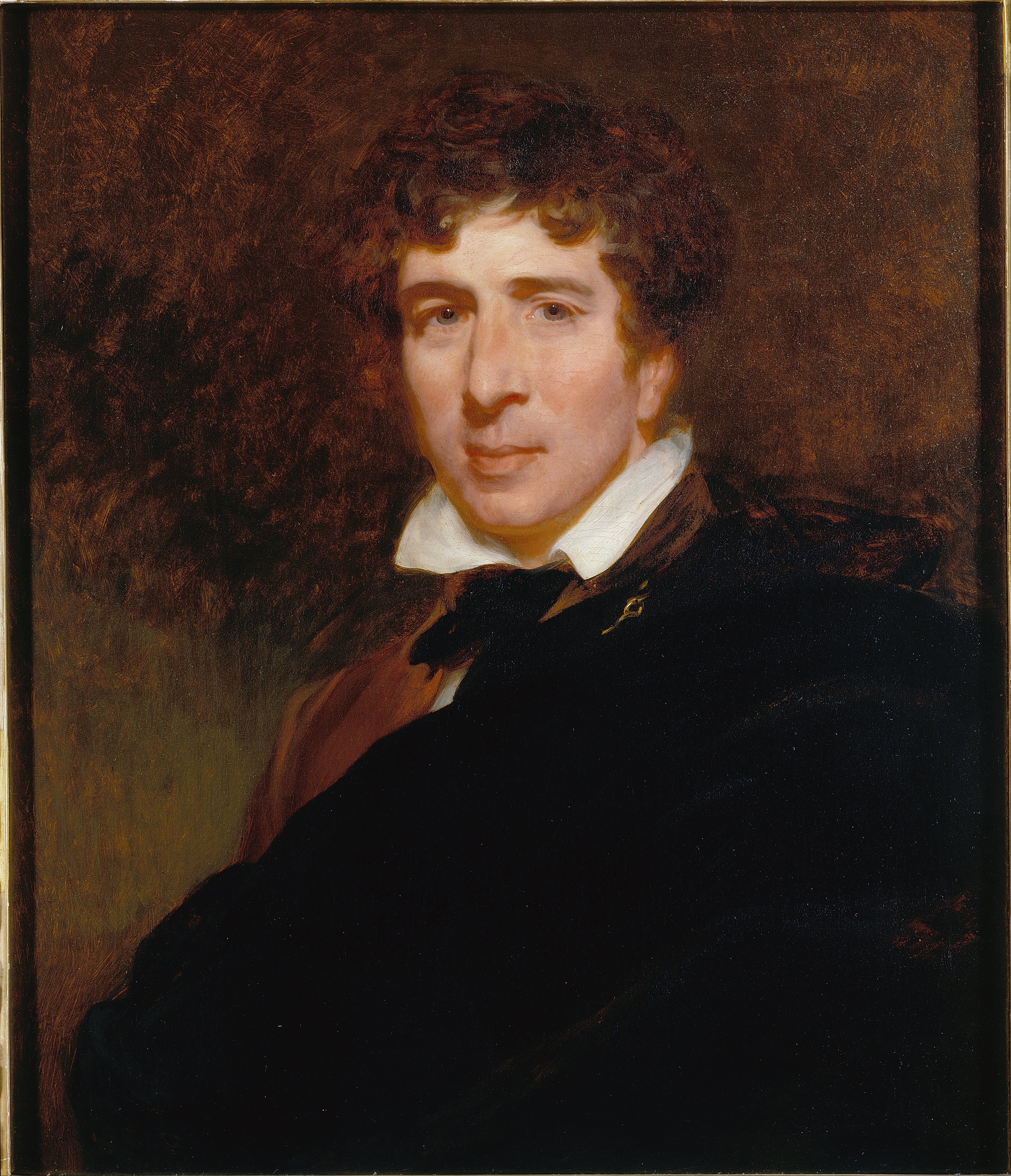
Charles Kemble, by Henry Perronet Briggs. Oil on canvas, before 1832

His first London appearance was on 21 April 1794, as Malcolm to his brother's Macbeth. Ultimately he won independent fame, especially in such characters as Archer in George Farquhar's The Beaux' Stratagem, Dorincourt in Hannah Cowley's The Belle's Stratagem, Charles Surface and Ranger in Benjamin Hoadley's The Suspicious Husband. His Laërtes and Macduff were as accomplished as his brother's Hamlet and Macbeth. His production of Cymbeline in 1827 inaugurated the trend to historical accuracy in stagings of that play that reached a peak with Henry Irving at the turn of the century.

In comedy, he was ably supported by his wife, Marie Therese De Camp, whom he married on 2 July 1806. His visit, with his daughter Fanny, to America during 1832 and 1834, aroused much enthusiasm. The later part of his career was beset by money troubles in connection with his joint proprietorship of Covent Garden theatre.

He formally retired from the stage in December 1836, but his final appearance was on 10 April 1840. From 1836 to 1840 he held the office of Examiner of Plays. In 1844-45 he gave readings from Shakespeare at Willis's Rooms. Macready regarded his Cassio as incomparable, and summed him up as "a first-rate actor of second-rate parts."

== Selected roles ==
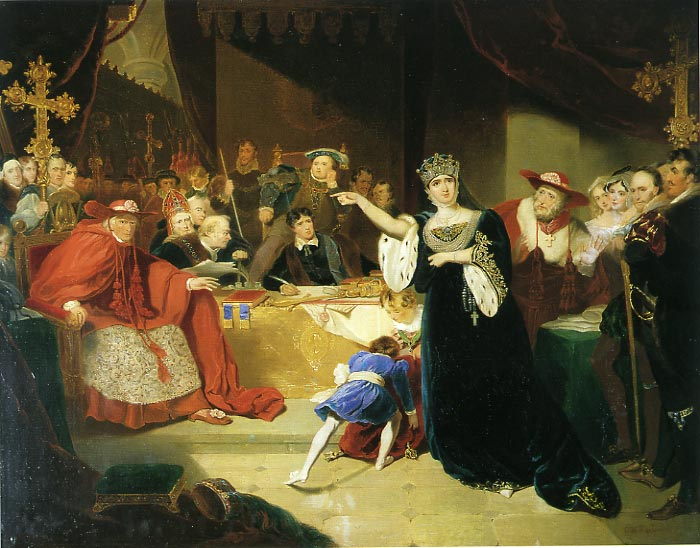
Kemble as Thomas Cromwell in The Court for the Trial of Queen Katharine by George Henry Harlow, 1817

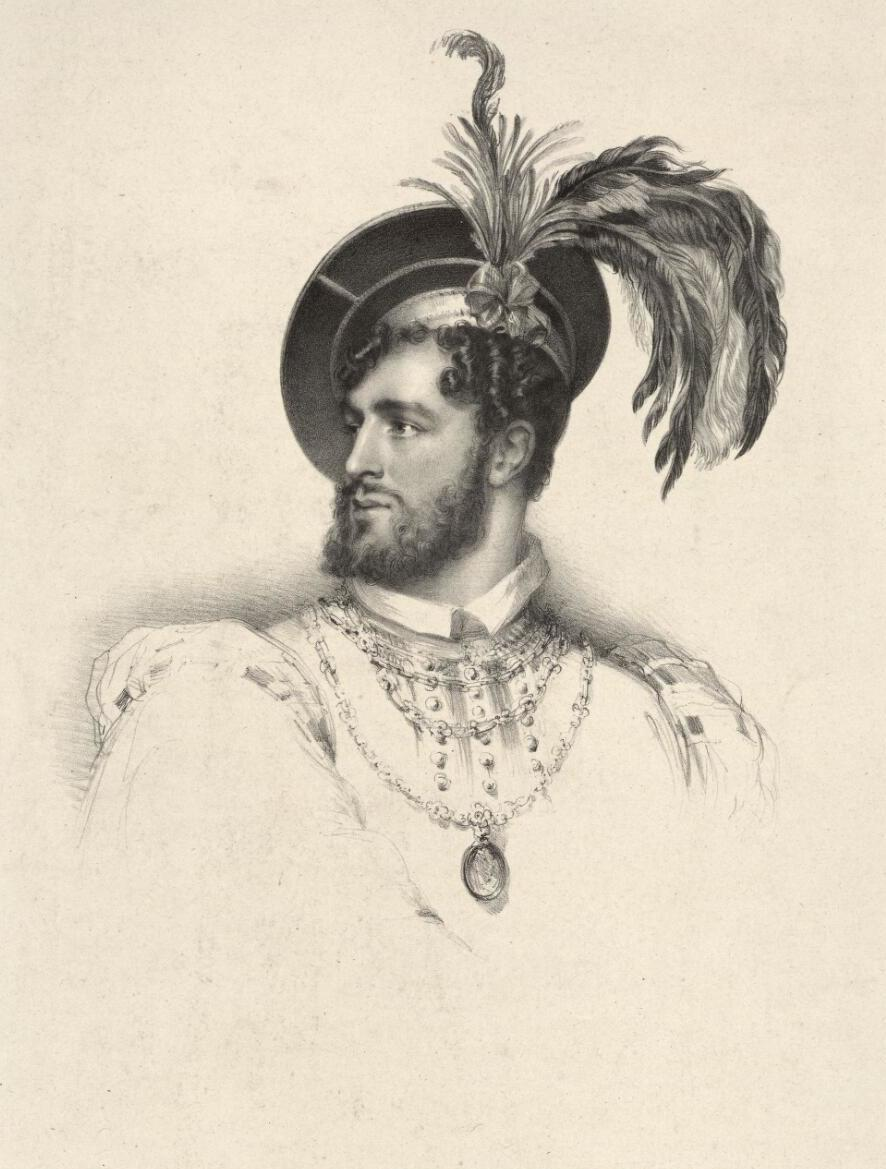
Charles Kemble as 'Pierre'

- Mr Contest in The Wedding Day by Elizabeth Inchbald (1794)
- Henry Woodville in The Wheel of Fortune by Richard Cumberland (1795)
- Radanzo in Zorinski by Thomas Morton (1795)
- Sigebert in Edwy and Elgiva by Fanny Burney (1795)
- Henry Woodville in The Wheel of Fortune by Richard Cumberland (1795)
- Pascentius in Vortigern and Rowena by William Henry Ireland (1796)
- Dorington in The Man of Ten Thousand by Thomas Holcroft (1796)
- Henrique in Don Pedro by Richard Cumberland (1796)
- Publius in The Conspiracy by Robert Jephson (1796)
- Hamet in Almeyda by Sophia Lee (1796)
- Young Woodland in Cheap Living by Frederick Reynolds (1797)
- Peregrine in The Last of the Family by Richard Cumberland (1797)
- Henry Horeland in The Heir at Law by George Colman the Younger (1797)
- Percy in The Castle Spectre by Matthew Lewis (1797)
- Lorenzo in Aurelio and Miranda by James Boaden (1798)
- Fernando in The Inquisitor by Thomas Holcroft (1798)
- Prince David in Cambro-Britons by James Boaden (1798)
- Mr Torrid in The Secret by Edward Morris (1799)
- Alonzo in Pizarro by Richard Brinsley Sheridan (1799)
- Beauchamp in The East Indian by Matthew Lewis (1799)
- Marquis of Vaublane in The Castle of Montval by Thomas Sedgwick Whalley (1799)
- Don Henry in Antonio by William Godwin (1800)
- King Henry in Adelaide by Henry James Pye (1800)
- Aldermorn in Adelmorn, the Outlaw by Matthew Lewis (1801)
- Sir Dudley Dorimant in Fashionable Friends by Mary Berry (1802)
- Rinaldo in The Voice of Nature by James Boaden (1802)
- Headlong in Hear Both Sides by Thomas Holcroft (1803)
- Colonel Dorimant in The Three Per Cents by Frederick Reynolds (1803)
- Charles Merton in The Marriage Promise by John Allingham (1803)
- Villars in The Blind Bargain by Frederick Reynolds (1804)
- Henry in Who Wants a Guinea? by George Colman the Younger (1805)
- Lord Transit in A Hint to Husbands by Richard Cumberland (1806)
- Plastic in Town and Country by Thomas Morton (1807)
- Algernon St Albyn in Begone Dull Care by Frederick Reynolds (1808)
- Vincent Templeton in Education by Thomas Morton (1813)
- Count Luneburg in Adelaide by Richard Lalor Sheil (1816)
- Hemaya in The Apostate by Richard Lalor Sheil (1817)
- Hamed in Retribution by John Dillon (1818)
- Giraldi in Fazio by Henry Hart Milman (1818)
- Manfredi in Bellamira by Richard Lalor Sheil (1818)
- Dorrington in A Word to the Ladies by James Kenney (1818)
- Aldemar in Fredolfo by Charles Maturin (1819)
- Vicentio in Evadne by Richard Lalor Sheil (1819)
- Icilius in Virginius by James Sheridan Knowles (1820)
- Douglas in Wallace by Charles Edward Walker (1820)
- Pythias in Damon and Pythias by Richard Lalor Sheil (1821)
- Guido in Mirandola by Barry Cornwall (1821)
- Raimond Di Procida in The Vespers of Palermo by Felicia Hemans (1823)
- Charles II in Charles the Second by John Howard Payne (1824)
- Leon in Rule a Wife and Have a Wife by John Fletcher (1825)
- Don Cesar in Love's Victory by George Hyde (1825)
- Conrad in The Three Strangers by Harriet Lee (1825)
- Francesco Foscari in Foscari by Mary Russell Mitford (1826)
- Duke of Rougemont in The French Libertine by John Howard Payne (1826)
- Sir Arthur Stanmore in A School for Grown Children by Thomas Morton (1827)
- Sir Thomas Clifford in The Hunchback by James Sheridan Knowles (1832)
- Charles of Bourbon in Francis the First by Fanny Kemble (1832)

== See also ==
- See: Gentleman's Magazine, January 1855, Obituary. Mr. Charles Kemble, Vol. 197, pp. 94–96.
- Records of a Girlhood, by Frances Anne Kemble.
