= Foscari (play) =

1826 play

- Written by: Mary Russell Mitford
- Original language: English
- Genre: Tragedy
- Setting: Venice, 15th century

Premiere
- Date premiered: 4 November 1826
- Place premiered: Theatre Royal, Covent Garden, London

Foscari is an 1826 historical tragedy by the British writer Mary Russell Mitford. The plot revolves around Francesco Foscari, the son of the Doge of Venice, who is wrongly accused of murder and has to go into exile. It premiered at the Theatre Royal, Covent Garden on 4 November 1826. The original cast included Charles Mayne Young as the Doge of Venice, Charles Kemble as Francesco Foscari, James Prescott Warde as Count Erizzo, and Daniel Egerton as Donato.

Mitford began writing the play in 1821 with the Covent Garden company in mind for the characters, but tensions between Charles Kemble and his rival at the theatre William Macready led to a long delay and Macready eventually did not appear. During the delay, the publication of Lord Byron's The Two Foscari based on the same subject, disturbed Mitford as she did not wish to be seen in competition with Byron. During the delay, she wrote another play Julian which was successfully performed at Covent Garden in 1823.

== Plot ==
In the Republic of Venice, tensions brew among the elite. Count Erizzo, envious of the Doge's power and coveting the ducal bonnet himself, manipulates the kind but temperamental Senator Donato by exploiting a minor slight: the Doge refuses Donato's request to appoint Erizzo's follower Celso to a vacant procurator post, citing Celso's unsavory character. Erizzo fans Donato's anger, drawing him into a faction plotting to depose the elderly Doge on grounds of incapacity due to age. Meanwhile, the Doge shares with his close friend Count Zeno a mysterious prophecy from his youth foretelling danger to his rule, and he receives an anonymous warning to grant the first boon requested the next day or suffer heartbreak. Donato's daughter Camilla is betrothed to the Doge's valiant son Francesco Foscari, a heroic general fighting in the Milan wars, while Donato's son Cosmo and niece Laura share a budding affection, and Cosmo enjoys the Doge's favor.

In the Senate, Erizzo, bolstered by Donato's resentment, accuses the Doge of misrule, favoring the populace over the nobility, and wasting resources on prolonged wars to glorify his son. They propose deposing him, nominating Donato as successor. The plot collapses dramatically when Francesco Foscari returns triumphant from the front, announcing a decisive victory at Brescia, the liberation of the city, and a peace treaty with Milan. He exposes Erizzo's interception of victory dispatches to delay news that would bolster the Doge's popularity. Foscari publicly castigates the conspirators, particularly Donato for betraying his old friend, but reconciles partially with him. The Senate reaffirms the Doge, who retains his position, while Foscari resigns his generalship, symbolically removing the ducal bonnet in a gesture of filial devotion before it is restored. Erizzo, humiliated and thwarted, secretly hires Celso to assassinate Foscari that night during his clandestine meeting with Camilla.

Foscari sneaks to Donato's palace for a midnight rendezvous with Camilla, facilitated by the absent Cosmo. A storm rages as they reaffirm their love amid fears of lingering family discord. Foscari escapes through a balcony when Donato stirs, but Celso, mistaking Donato for Foscari in the dark (or perhaps seizing the opportunity), stabs him. Celso plants Foscari's dropped sword and cloak at the scene. Donato's dying cries name "Foscari", and Erizzo, "conveniently" nearby with Cosmo, frames the young hero for the murder.

Foscari is tried in a hall of justice presided over by the heartbroken Doge. The evidence—the sword, cloak, Donato's last words, and Erizzo's testimony of seeing Foscari flee—is overwhelming. Cosmo, devastated by his father's death, accuses his childhood friend bitterly. Camilla, summoned as a witness, heard Donato's dying accusation but steadfastly proclaims Foscari's innocence, refusing to condemn him despite pressure. Threatened with torture, Foscari defiantly demands the rack rather than confess falsely. The Senate convicts him but, respecting his and the Doge's stature, commutes death to perpetual exile in Candia.

On the seashore, Foscari prepares to depart. Camilla defies Cosmo to accompany her betrothed into exile, enduring her brother's furious denunciation as a parricide's bride. Cosmo pursues her, leading to a duel with the unarmed Foscari (armed by Erizzo). Foscari is mortally wounded. As he dies, Zeno arrives with news that Celso has confessed: Erizzo orchestrated the plot, and Celso killed Donato by mistake while intending Foscari. Erizzo is arrested but gloats over his revenge. The exonerated Foscari dies in Camilla's arms, proclaiming joy at his restored honor. The devastated Doge, cursing the ducal crown that forced him to condemn his innocent son, flings it away and collapses from a broken heart.

== Bibliography ==
- Burwick, Frederick Goslee, Nancy Moore & Hoeveler Diane Long . The Encyclopedia of Romantic Literature. John Wiley & Sons, 2012.
- Nicoll, Allardyce. A History of Early Nineteenth Century Drama 1800-1850. Cambridge University Press, 1930.
