= John Langford Pritchard =

English actor

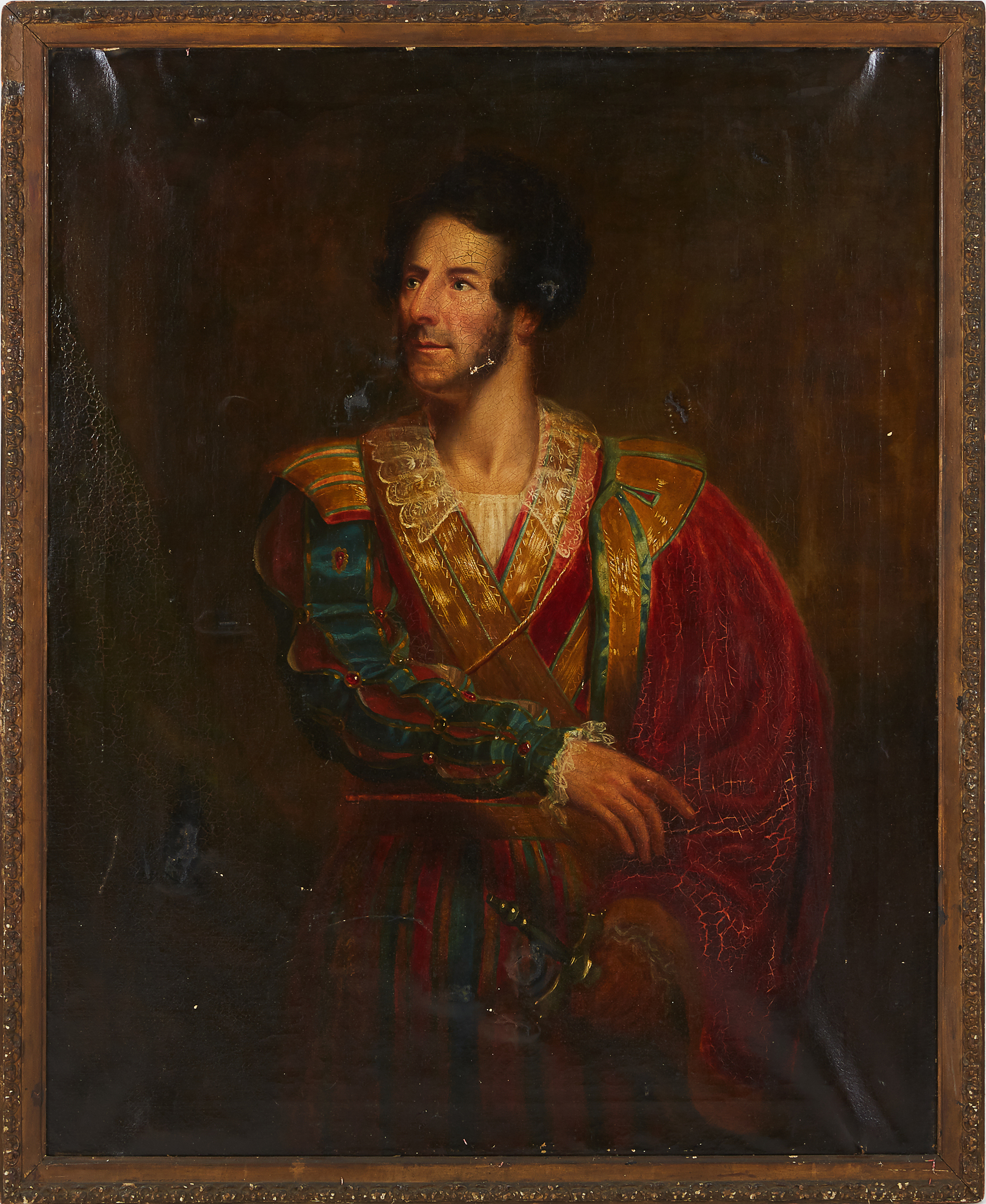
- Portrait of Pritchard from 1829 dressed as 'Don Felix' in the play 'The Wonder'. Painting by unknown artist.
- Born: 1799
- Died: 5 August 1850 (aged 50–51)

John Langford Home Pritchard (1799 – 5 August 1850) was an English actor, known as "Gentleman Pritchard".

== Biography ==
Pritchard was the son of a captain in the navy, was born, it is said, at sea, in 1799, and, adopting his father's profession, became a midshipman. After some practice as an amateur actor he joined a small company in Wales, and on 24 May 1820, as "Pritchard from Cheltenham”. He made his first appearance in Bath, playing Captain Absolute in The Rivals. In August he played under Bunn, at the New Theatre, Birmingham, in parts such as Lord Trinket, Sir Benjamin Backbite, and other parts, and reappeared in Bath on 30 October as Irwin in Mrs. Inchbald's Every One Has His Fault. On 23 May 1821 he played Dumain (First Lord) in All's well that ends well.

In mid-1821 Pritchard joined the York circuit under Mansell, making his first appearance as Romeo. Parts such as Jaffrer, Pythias, Iago, Edmund in King Lear, Richmond, Jeremy Diddler, and Duke of Mirandola, were assigned him. He then joined Murray's company in Edinburgh, appearing on 16 January 1823 as Durimel in Charles Kemble's adaptation Point of Honour. Here, playing leading business, he remained eleven years. On 6 February he was the original Nigel in George Heriot, an anonymous adaptation of the Fortunes of Nigel. On 22 May 1824 he was Edward Waverley in a new version of Waverley, and on 5 June Francies Tyrrell in James Planché's St. Ronan's Well. On 21 January 1825 he played Rob Roy, a difficult feat in Edinburgh for an Englishman. He played on 23 May the Stranger in the Rose of Ettrick Vale, on the 28th Redgauntlet. Soon afterwards he was Richard I in Talisman, and on 4 July George Douglas in Mary Stuart (the Abbot); Harry Stanley in Paul Pry followed. On 18 June 1826 he was Oliver Cromwell in Woodstock, or the Cavalier.

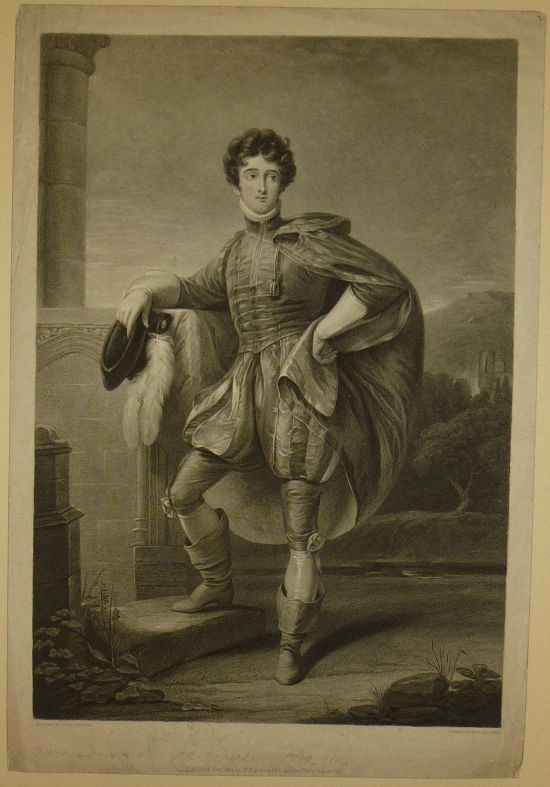
Portrait of John Langford Pritchard

Charles Edward, or the last of the Stuarts, adapted from the French by a son of Flora Macdonald, was given for the first time on 21 April 1829, with Pritchard as the title character. In 1830 through 1831, Pritchard went with Murray to the Adelphi Theatre (Edinburgh), where he appeared on 6 July 1831 as Abdar Khan in Mazeppa. In the Renegade by Maturin, Pritchard was Guiscard, and on 16 April 1832, in a week at Holyrood, was the first Wemyss of Logie. He was also seen as Joseph Surface. Pritchard appeared a few times at the Adelphi in the summer season, and then left Edinburgh. During his stay, he won very favourable recognition, artistic and social. He took a prominent part in establishing the Edinburgh Theatrical Fund (becoming the Honorary Secretary), and was a steward at the Fund dinner on 23 February 1827 when Walter Scott announced himself to be the author of Waverley. During his vacations he had played in Glasgow, Perth, Aberdeen, and other leading Scottish towns.

On 5 October 1833 Pritchard made his first appearance in Dublin, playing Bassanio, and Petruchio; Wellborn to the Sir Giles Overreach of Charles Kean followed on October 7. In Ireland, where he was hospitably entertained, he also played Jeremy Diddler. Mark Antony, and Meg Merrilies. His first appearance in London was made on 16 November 1835 at Covent Garden as Alonzo in Pizarro. He played Macduff, and was popular as Lindsay, an original part in Fitzball's Inheritance. During William Macready's tenure of Covent Garden in 1838 he acted as his stage manager. During this time he reappeared as Don Pedro in the Wonder by Susanna Centlivre, Macready himself playing Don Felix, which was held to be Pritchard's great part. He took a secondary part in the performance of The Lady of Lyons, and was the original Felton in Sheridan Knowles's Woman's Wit. Macready, with some apparent reason, was charged with keeping him back.

Pritchard retired ultimately to the country, and became the manager and sole lessee of the York circuit for his final nine years of his life, where he continued to act. He died on 5 August 1850 and is buried in Leeds Cemetery. His best parts appear to have been Don Felix and Mercutio.
