= Strafford (play) =

1837 play

- Original language: English
- Written by: Robert Browning
- Genre: Historical
- Setting: London, 1641

Premiere
- Date: 1 May 1837
- Place: Covent Garden Theatre, London

Strafford is an 1837 tragedy by the British writer Robert Browning. It portrays the downfall and execution of Lord Strafford, the advisor to Charles I shortly before the English Civil War.

The play was first staged at the Covent Garden Theatre in London's West End. The original cast included William Macready as Strafford, William Harries Tilbury as Lord Savile, John Vandenhoff as John Pym, George John Bennett as Denzil Hollis, John Langford Pritchard as Benjamin Rudyard and Helena Faucit as Lucy Percy, Countess of Carlisle. It was one of the last plays to premiere in the pre-Victorian era when William IV was still on the throne.

== Bibliography ==
- Nicoll, Allardyce. A History of Early Nineteenth Century Drama 1800-1850. Cambridge University Press, 1930.
