= Damon and Pythias (1821 play) =

1821 play

- Original language: English
- Written by: John Banim; Richard Lalor Sheil
- Genre: Tragedy
- Setting: Syracuse, Magna Graecia

Premiere
- Date: 28 May 1821
- Place: Theatre Royal, Covent Garden, London

Damon and Pythias is an 1821 tragedy by the Irish writers John Banim and Richard Lalor Sheil. It is based on the Greek legend of Damon and Pythias. It premiered at the Theatre Royal, Covent Garden in London on 28 May 1821. The original cast included William Macready as Damon, Charles Kemble as Pythias, William Abbot as Dionysius, Daniel Egerton as Damocles, William Chapman as Nicias, Thomas Comer as Procles, Charles Connor as Lucullus and Maria Foote as Hermion. It was widely performed in Ireland and the United States including at the Chestnut Street Theatre in Philadelphia.

== Bibliography ==
- Burwick, Frederck Goslee, Nancy Moore & Hoeveler Diane Long . The Encyclopaedia of Romantic Literature. John Wiley & Sons, 2012.
- Morash, Christopher. A History of Irish Theatre 1601-2000. Cambridge University Press, 2002.
- Nicoll, Allardyce. A History of Early Nineteenth Century Drama 1800-1850. Cambridge University Press, 1930.
