= The Wheel of Fortune (play) =

1795 play by Richard Cumberland

- 1823 edition
- Original language: English
- Written by: Richard Cumberland
- Genre: Comedy
- Setting: London, present day

Premiere
- Date: 28 February 1795
- Place: Theatre Royal, Drury Lane, London

The Wheel of Fortune: A Comedy is a comedy in five acts written by playwright Richard Cumberland and first presented at the Drury Lane Theatre in London on 28 February 1795, with a prologue and an epilogue. The original cast included John Philip Kemble as Penruddock, Robert Palmer as David Daw, Thomas King as Tempest, George Bland as Jenkins, John Whitfield as Woodville, John Palmer as Sydenham, Charles Kemble as Henry Woodville, Richard Suett as Weazel, Francis Godolphin Waldron as Woodville's Servant, Walter Maddocks as Penruddock's Servant, John Phillimore as Attendant, Jane Powell as Mrs. Woodville, Elizabeth Farren as Emily Tempest and Charlotte Tidswell as Maid.

John Philip Kemble was praised for his portrayal of the misanthropic, embittered Roderick Penruddock, who cannot forget but learns to forgive. The famous playwright August von Kotzebue claimed that the misanthropic character was stolen from his Menschenhass und Reue. Elizabeth Inchbald was in some measure of agreement with Kotzebue, but Cumberland objected. Weazel the lawyer was one of Richard Suett's best roles.

The play is mentioned in Jane Austen's 1814 novel Mansfield Park:

All the best plays were run over in vain. Neither Hamlet, nor Macbeth, nor Othello, nor Douglas, nor the Gamester, presented any thing that could satisfy even the tragedians; and the Rivals, the School for Scandal, Wheel of Fortune, Heir at Law, and a long et cætera, were successively dismissed with yet warmer objections.

In December 1796 Ann Brunton Merry played the role of Emily Tempest at the Chestnut Street Theatre in Philadelphia.

== Characters ==
- Sir David Daw — Wealthy man that Emily Tempest's father wants Emily to marry
- Tempest — Father of Emily Tempest
- Roderick Penruddock — An embittered former suitor of Arabella, who married Woodville
- Woodville — Husband of Arabella
- Sydenham — Friend of Woodville
- Henry Woodville — Son, and only child, from Arabella's marriage and love interest of Emily
- Timothy Weazel — Lawyer
- Attendant in the house of Woodville
- Jenkins — Butler in charge of the deceased Sir George Penruddock's servants
- Livery servant
- Servants of the deceased Sir George Penruddock
- Servant to Tempest
- Mrs. Woodville — Arabella, who married Woodville
- Emily Tempest — Love interest of Henry Woodville
- Dame Dunckley — Roderick Penruddock's elderly servant at his cottage
- Maid of the lodging

== Plot summary ==
Roderick Penruddock's rural cottage is the location for the first act. The scenes of other four acts are in London. The comic lawyer Timothy Weazel finds Roderick Penruddock, who has been living for twenty years in isolated misanthropy, embittered against Arabella and his enemy Woodville. Weazel informs Penruddock that he is the heir of the deceased Sir George Penruddock, a cousin of Roderick. This unexpected inheritance and Woodville's ruin at the gaming tables create a possibility. Roderick plots his revenge and searches for his enemy Woodville in London, where he encounters Henry Woodville. Arabella and his enemy Woodville's friend Sydenham make appeals to Penruddock. The appeals and his own pangs of conscience cause Penruddock to repent, turn to forgiveness, abandon his plans for revenge, and bestow a fortune upon Henry Woodville and Emily.
