= Retribution (play) =

1818 play

- Original language: English
- Written by: John Dillon
- Genre: Tragedy
- Setting: Middle East

Premiere
- Date: 1 January 1818
- Place: Theatre Royal, Covent Garden, London

Retribution is an 1818 British tragedy by the writer John Dillon. It premiered at the Theatre Royal, Covent Garden in London on 1 January 1818. The original London cast included Charles Mayne Young as Veranes, King of Persia, William Macready as Chosroo, Charles Kemble as Hamed, Daniel Egerton as Abdas, William Abbot as Hafiz, Daniel Terry as Suthes, Charles Connor as Sohrab and Elizabeth O'Neill as Zimra.

== Bibliography ==
- Greene, John C. Theatre in Dublin, 1745-1820: A Calendar of Performances, Volume 6. Lexington Books, 2011.
- Nicoll, Allardyce. A History of Early Nineteenth Century Drama 1800-1850. Cambridge University Press, 1930.
