= Evadne (play) =

1819 play

- Original language: English
- Written by: Richard Lalor Sheil
- Genre: Tragedy
- Setting: Naples, Italy

Premiere
- Date: 10 February 1819
- Place: Theatre Royal, Covent Garden, London

Evadne is an 1819 historical tragedy by the Irish writer Richard Lalor Sheil. It premiered at the Theatre Royal, Covent Garden in London on 10 February 1819. The original cast included Elizabeth O'Neill as Evadne, William Macready as Ludovico, William Abbot as the King of Naples, Charles Mayne Young as Colonna, Charles Kemble as Vicentio, Charles Connor as Spalatro and Harriet Faucit as Olivia. Sheil dedicated the published play to his fellow Irish writer Thomas Moore.

== Bibliography ==
- Morash, Christopher. A History of Irish Theatre 1601-2000. Cambridge University Press, 2002.
- Nicoll, Allardyce. A History of Early Nineteenth Century Drama 1800-1850. Cambridge University Press, 1930.
