= The Pledge (play) =

1831 play by James Kenney

- Original language: English
- Written by: James Kenney
- Genre: Tragedy

Premiere
- Date: 8 April 1831
- Place: Theatre Royal, Drury Lane, London

The Pledge; Or, Castilian Honour is an 1831 tragedy by the British writer James Kenney. It premiered at the Theatre Royal, Drury Lane in London on 8 April 1831. It is inspired by the play Hernani by French writer Victor Hugo. The original London cast included William Macready as Don Leo, Henry John Wallack as Hernani, John Cooper as Don Carlos and George Yarnold as Don Ricardo.

== Bibliography ==
- France, Peter & Haynes, Kenneth. The Oxford History of Literary Translation in English:: Volume 4: 1790-1900. Oxford University Press, 2006.
- Nicoll, Allardyce. A History of Early Nineteenth Century Drama 1800-1850. Cambridge University Press, 1930.
