= Fredolfo =

1819 play

- Original language: English
- Written by: Charles Maturin
- Genre: Historical tragedy
- Setting: Swiss Alps, 14th century

Premiere
- Date: 12 May 1819
- Place: Theatre Royal, Covent Garden, London

Fredolfo is an 1819 historical tragedy by the Irish writer Charles Maturin. It premiered at the Theatre Royal, Covent Garden in London on 12 May 1819. The original cast included William Macready as Wallenberg, Charles Mayne Young as Fredolfo, Charles Kemble as Aldemar, Frederick Henry Yates as Berthold, Charles Connor as Waldo and Elizabeth O'Neill as Urilda. Maturin dedicated the published version to the Duke of Leinster, which was published by Archibald Constable. The work was considered a failure which failed to recaptured the success of his earlier Bertram and Maturin turned back to writing novels.

== Bibliography ==
- Greene, John C. Theatre in Dublin, 1745-1820: A Calendar of Performances, Volume 6. Lexington Books, 2011.
- Murray, Christopher John. Encyclopedia of the Romantic Era, 1760-1850, Volume 2. Taylor & Francis, 2004.
- Nicoll, Allardyce. A History of Early Nineteenth Century Drama 1800-1850. Cambridge University Press, 1930.
