= Woman's Wit (Knowles play) =

1838 play

- Original language: English
- Written by: James Sheridan Knowles
- Genre: Comedy

Premiere
- Date: 23 June 1838
- Place: Theatre Royal, Covent Garden

Woman's Wit; or, Loves Disguises is an 1838 comedy play by the Irish writer James Sheridan Knowles. It premiered at the Theatre Royal, Covent Garden on the 23 June 1838 with a cast that included James Warde as Lord Athunree, George Bartley as Sir William Sutton, William Macready as Walsingham, John Langford Pritchard as Felton, John Pritt Harley as Clever and Helena Faucit as Hero. Knowles dedicated the play to the writer Samuel Rogers.

== Bibliography ==
- Burwick, Frederck Goslee, Nancy Moore & Hoeveler Diane Long . The Encyclopaedia of Romantic Literature. John Wiley & Sons, 2012.
- Nicoll, Allardyce. A History of Early Nineteenth Century Drama 1800-1850. Cambridge University Press, 1930.
