= Elizabeth O'Neill (actress) =

Irish actress

- Eliza O'Neill as Belvidera by Arthur William Devis, 1816
- Born: 1791; Drogheda
- Died: 29 October 1872
- Occupation: Stage actress
- Notable work: Adelaide; Romeo and Juliet; Adelgitha; The Apostate; Retribution; Bellamira; Fredolfo; Evadne

Elizabeth O'Neill (1791–29 October 1872) was an Irish stage actress.

== Biography ==
Born in Drogheda, she was the daughter of an actor and stage manager. Her first appearance on the stage was made at the Crow Street Theatre in 1811 as the Widow Cheerly in Andrew Cherry's The Soldier's Daughter, and after several years in Ireland she came to London and made an immediate success as Juliet at Covent Garden in 1814. For five years she was the favourite of London town in comedy as well as tragedy, but in the latter she particularly excelled, being frequently compared, not to her disadvantage, with the great Sarah Siddons.

In 1819 she married William Wrixon Becher of Ballygiblin Castle, an Irish M.P., who was to be created a baronet in 1831. After her marriage, she never returned to the stage. She died on 29 October 1872.

== Selected roles ==
- Adelaide in Adelaide by Richard Sheil (1814)
- Juliet in Romeo and Juliet by William Shakespeare (1814)
- Adelgitha in Adelgitha by Matthew Lewis (1817)
- Florinda in The Apostate by Richard Sheil (1817)
- Zimra in Retribution by John Dillon (1818)
- Bellamira in Bellamira by Richard Sheil (1818)
- Urilda in Fredolfo by Charles Maturin (1819)
- Evadne in Evadne by Richard Sheil (1819)

== See also ==
- List of entertainers who married titled Britons
