= Wallace (play) =

1820 play

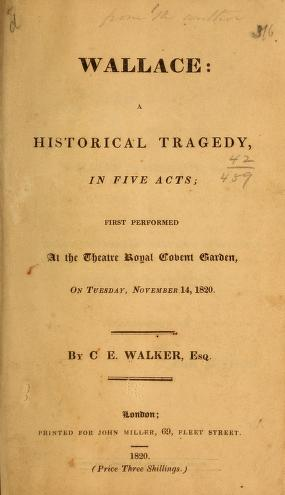
- Original language: English
- Written by: Charles Edward Walker
- Genre: Historical tragedy
- Setting: Scotland, 14th century

Premiere
- Date: 14 November 1820
- Place: Theatre Royal, Covent Garden, London

Wallace is an 1820 historical tragedy by the British writer Charles Edward Walker. It portrays the Scottish leader William Wallace and the events surrounding his capture and execution, due to the betrayal of John de Menteith. It premiered at the Theatre Royal, Covent Garden in London on 14 November 1820. It starred William Macready as Wallace, Charles Kemble as Douglas, Daniel Egerton as Comyn, William Abbot as Montieth, Thomas Comer as Kierly, William Chapman as Clare, Earl of Gloster, Charles Connor as Lord de Clifford and Margaret Agnes Bunn as Helen. It was performed sixteen times. The critic John Waldie, who saw the play in Newcastle four months after its London premiere, compared it to Richard Brinsley Sheridan's 1799 hit Pizarro.

== Synopsis ==
After defeat against the English at the Battle of Falkirk, Scottish war leader Wallace manages to escape to the apparent safety of a glen. There he is betrayed by Montieth who hands him over to the English. As Wallace goes resignedly to his execution, his wife Helen dies of grief in the arms of his ally Douglas

== Bibliography ==
- Burwick, Frederick. Romantic Drama: Acting and Reacting. Cambridge University Press, 2009
- Genest, John. Some Account of the English Stage: From the Restoration in 1660 to 1830, Volume 9. H.E. Carrington, 1832.
- Nicoll, Allardyce. A History of Early Nineteenth Century Drama 1800-1850. Cambridge University Press, 1930.
