= Virginius (play) =

1820 play

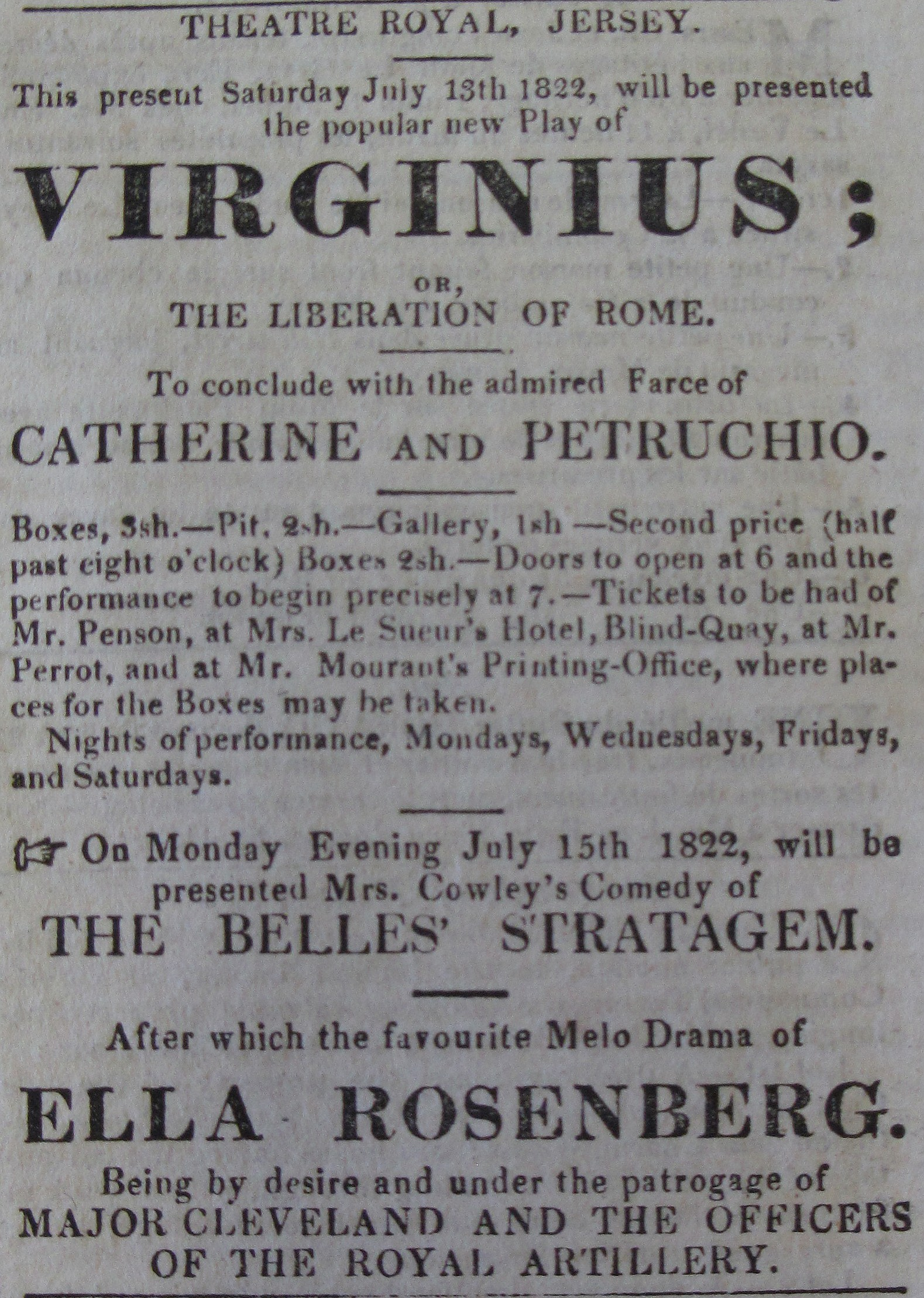
- Original language: English
- Written by: James Sheridan Knowles
- Genre: Tragedy
- Setting: Ancient Rome

Premiere
- Date: 17 May 1820
- Place: Covent Garden Theatre, London

Virginius is an 1820 tragedy in five acts by the Irish writer James Sheridan Knowles. It was part of a crop of plays set during the Roman Republic, part of a revival of interest in the period. The play is based on the story of Verginia.

The original cast featured William Macready as Virginius, Maria Foote as Virginia, Harriet Faucit as Servia, William Abbot as Appius Claudius, Charles Connor as Caius Claudius, John Faucit as Titus, Daniel Egerton as Numitorius, Thomas Comer as Lucius, Charles Kemble as Icilius and Daniel Terry as Dentatus.

== Bibliography ==
- Sachs, Jonathon. Romantic Antiquity: Rome in the British Imagination, 1789-1832. OUP USA, 2010.
