= Adelgitha =

1807 play

- 1858 American edition
- Original language: English
- Written by: Matthew Lewis
- Genre: Historical tragedy
- Setting: Otranto, 1080

Premiere
- Date: 30 April 1807
- Place: Theatre Royal, Drury Lane, London

Adelgitha is a tragedy by the British writer Matthew Lewis. It premiered at the Theatre Royal, Drury Lane on 30 April 1807 having originally been published the year before. The cast included Henry Siddons, Robert William Elliston, George Frederick Cooke and Jane Powell while the incidental music was composed by Michael Kelly. It was one in a run of Gothic plays Lewis produced following the success of The Castle Spectre. The play is set in Otranto around 1080 which was ruled over by Robert Guiscard following the Norman conquest of southern Italy.

It appeared again at the Theatre Royal, Covent Garden in 1817 where the cast included William Macready as the Emperor of Byzantium, Charles Mayne Young as the Prince of Apulia, Elizabeth O'Neill as Adelgitha, Sarah Booth as Imma and Maria Foote as Claudia. In May 1817 it appeared at the Crow Street Theatre in Dublin.

== Bibliography ==
- Evans, Bertrand. Gothic Drama from Walpole to Shelley. University of California Press, 2022.
- Greene, John C. Theatre in Dublin, 1745-1820: A Calendar of Performances, Volume 6. Lexington Books, 2011.
- Irwin, Joseph James. M. G. "Monk" Lewis. Twayne Publishers, 1976.
