= The Apostate (play) =

1817 play

- Original language: English
- Written by: Richard Lalor Sheil
- Genre: Tragedy
- Setting: Granada, Spain

Premiere
- Date: 3 May 1817
- Place: Theatre Royal, Covent Garden, London

The Apostate is an 1817 tragedy by the Irish writer Richard Lalor Sheil. It premiered at the Theatre Royal, Covent Garden on 3 May 1817. The original cast included William Macready as Pescara, Charles Kemble as Hemeya, Charles Mayne Young as Malec, Thomas Comer as Hamy, Charles Murray as Alvarez, Daniel Egerton as Gomez and Elizabeth O'Neill as Florinda. The prologue was spoken by Charles Connor. It was loosely inspired by a 17th-century work by the Spanish playwright Pedro Calderón de la Barca. The play was a success, but reviewers generally attributed this to O'Neill's acting rather than Sheil's writing.

John Wilkes Booth's last appearance onstage before he assassinated Abraham Lincoln was as Pescara at Ford's Theater. Of that appearance, the Washington Republican later wrote: "The villain Pescara was represented by the greater villain Booth."

== Bibliography ==
- Armstrong, James. Romantic Actors, Romantic Dramas: British Tragedy on the Regency Stage. Springer Nature, 2022.
- Morash, Christopher. A History of Irish Theatre 1601-2000. Cambridge University Press, 2002.
- Nicoll, Allardyce. A History of Early Nineteenth Century Drama 1800-1850. Cambridge University Press, 1930.
