= Adelaide (1814 play) =

1814 play

- Original language: English
- Written by: Richard Lalor Sheil
- Genre: Tragedy
- Setting: Germany, 1790s

Premiere
- Date: 19 February 1814
- Place: Crow Street Theatre, Dublin

Adelaide is an 1814 tragedy by the Irish writer Richard Lalor Sheil. It premiered at the Crow Street Theatre in Dublin on 19 February 1814. The Dublin cast included Elizabeth O'Neill in the title role and Charles Connor as Count Luneburg. On 23 May 1816 it appeared for the first time in London's West End at the Theatre Royal, Covent Garden. The first London cast featured Elizabeth O'Neill reprising her Dublin role as Adelaide, Charles Mayne Young as Count St. Evermont, Charles Kemble as Count Lunenburg, William Abbot as Albert, Charles Murray as Godfrey, Daniel Egerton as Colbert, Sarah Egerton as Madame St. Evermont and Maria Foote as Julia. It takes place in Germany amidst emigres who have fled from the French Revolution.

== Bibliography ==
- Armstrong, James. Romantic Actors, Romantic Dramas: British Tragedy on the Regency Stage. Springer Nature, 2022.
- Greene, John C. Theatre in Dublin, 1745-1820: A Calendar of Performances, Volume 6. Lexington Books, 2011.
- Morash, Christopher. A History of Irish Theatre 1601-2000. Cambridge University Press, 2002.
- Nicoll, Allardyce. A History of Early Nineteenth Century Drama 1800-1850. Cambridge University Press, 1930.
