= The Youthful Days of Frederick the Great =

1817 play

- Original language: English
- Written by: William Abbot
- Genre: Melodrama
- Setting: Kingdom of Prussia, 18th century

Premiere
- Date: 2 October 1817
- Place: Theatre Royal, Covent Garden, London

The Youthful Days of Frederick the Great is an 1817 stage melodrama by the British writer and actor William Abbot. It premiered at the Theatre Royal, Covent Garden in London on 2 October 1817. The cast included Daniel Terry as Frederick William, King of Prussia, Abbot as The Prince Royal, Daniel Egerton as Baron Kniphausen, Chapman as Count Seckendoff, Charles Connor as Anhalt, Charles Farley as Frederstoff and Harriet Faucit as Christine.

== Synopsis ==
Growing up in a Potsdam ruled by his domineering father Frederick William of Prussia, the young Prince and future Frederick the Great plans to flee the country in protest at his father's plan for an arranged marriage with a woman he has never met.

== Bibliography ==
- Greene, John C. Theatre in Dublin, 1745–1820: A Calendar of Performances, Volume 6. Lexington Books, 2011.
- Nicoll, Allardyce. A History of Early Nineteenth Century Drama 1800–1850. Cambridge University Press, 1930.
