= Bellamira (Sheil play) =

1818 play

- Original language: English
- Written by: Richard Lalor Sheil
- Genre: Tragedy
- Setting: Tunis, North Africa

Premiere
- Date: 22 April 1818
- Place: Theatre Royal, Covent Garden, London

Bellamira is an 1818 historical tragedy by the Irish writer Richard Lalor Sheil. It premiered at the Theatre Royal, Covent Garden in London on 22 April 1818. The original cast included Elizabeth O'Neill as Bellamira, William Macready as Amurath, Charles Kemble as Manfredi, Charles Mayne Young as Montalto, Daniel Terry as Salerno, Charles Connor as Kaled, and Thomas Comer as Gonzaga. Sheil dedicated the play to the Whig politician Lord Holland.

== Bibliography ==
- Armstrong, James. Romantic Actors, Romantic Dramas: British Tragedy on the Regency Stage. Springer Nature, 2022.
- Morash, Christopher. A History of Irish Theatre 1601-2000. Cambridge University Press, 2002.
- Nicoll, Allardyce. A History of Early Nineteenth Century Drama 1800-1850. Cambridge University Press, 1930.
