= The Conquest of Taranto =

1817 play

- Original language: English
- Written by: William Dimond
- Genre: Musical drama

Premiere
- Date: 5 August 1817
- Place: Theatre Royal, Covent Garden, London

The Conquest of Taranto is an 1817 musical drama written by William Dimond with music composed by Michael Kelly. It appeared at the Theatre Royal, Covent Garden on 15 April 1817. The original cast featured Junius Brutus Booth as Rinaldo, William Macready as Valencia, Charles Mayne Young as Aben Hamet, Daniel Egerton as Gonzales, Sarah Booth as Oriana and Kitty Stephens as Rosalind. Macready was reportedly dissatisfied with his role, coveting that of Rinaldo, and unsuccessfully offered thirty pounds the Covent Garden manager Thomas Harris to release him during rehearsals. The first Dublin performance was at the Crow Street Theatre on 5 August 1817. It also appeared at the Federal Street Theatre in Boston and other American venues.

William Hazlitt in A View of the English Stage wrote that it enjoyed a "success proportionate to its merits". "This style may be described as the purely romantic, there is little or nothing classical in it".

== Bibliography ==
- Archer, Stephen M. Junius Brutus Booth: Theatrical Prometheus. SIU Press, 2010.
- Greene, John C. Theatre in Dublin, 1745-1820: A Calendar of Performances, Volume 6. Lexington Books, 2011.
- Hazlitt, William. A View of the English Stage: Or, a Series of Dramatic Criticisms. John Warren, 1821.
- Nicoll, Allardyce. A History of Early Nineteenth Century Drama 1800-1850. Cambridge University Press, 1930.
