= A Word to the Ladies =

1818 play

- Original language: English
- Written by: James Kenney
- Genre: Comedy

Premiere
- Date: 17 December 1818
- Place: Theatre Royal, Covent Garden, London

A Word to the Ladies or A Word for the Ladies is an 1818 comedy play by the British writer James Kenney. It premiered at the Theatre Royal, Covent Garden on 17 December 1818. The original cast included William Macready as Winterland, Charles Mayne Young as Larum, Charles Kemble as Dorrington, Elizabeth Yates as Miss Singleton, Harriet Faucit as Clara Winterland, Charles Connor as Adamant, William Abbot as Young Bowerscourt, William Farren as Old Bowerscourt, John Liston as Silvertongue and John Emery as Snugg.

== Bibliography ==
- Greene, John C. Theatre in Dublin, 1745-1820: A Calendar of Performances, Volume 6. Lexington Books, 2011.
- Nicoll, Allardyce. A History of Early Nineteenth Century Drama 1800-1850. Cambridge University Press, 1930.
