= Fazio (play) =

1818 play

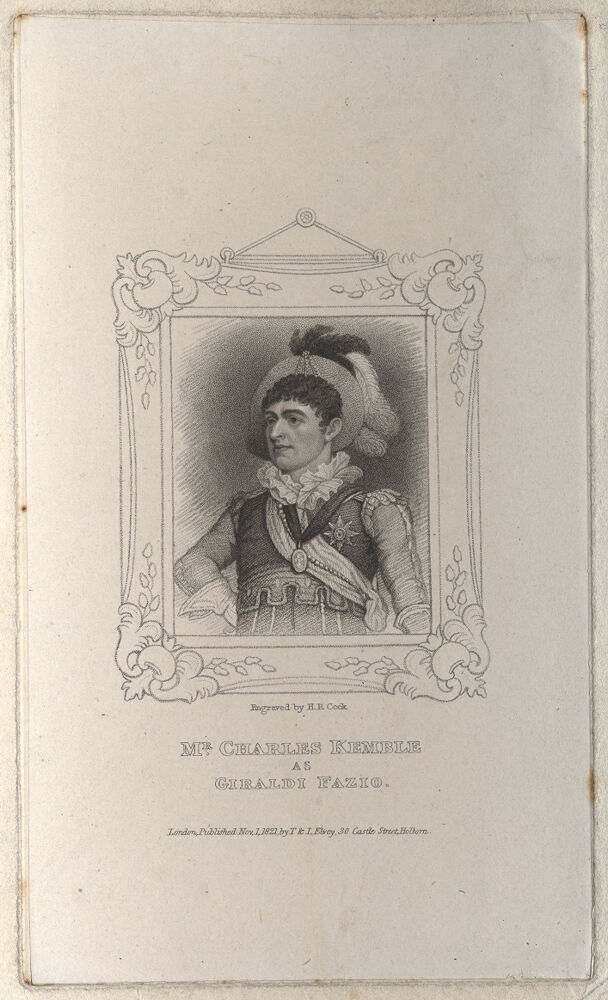
- Charles Kemble as Fazio.
- Original language: English
- Written by: Henry Hart Milman
- Genre: Tragedy

Premiere
- Date: 5 February 1818
- Place: Theatre Royal, Covent Garden, London

Fazio is a tragedy by the British writer Henry Hart Milman. It was first published in 1815. An unauthorised adaptation was performed at the Surrey Theatre under the title The Italian Wife. Another unauthorised version was performed at the Theatre Royal, Bath. In 1818 Milman granted permission for the Theatre Royal, Covent Garden to stage the play. It premiered there on 5 February 1818. It starred Charles Kemble as Giraldi Fazio, Elizabeth O'Neill as Bianca, Daniel Egerton as the Duke of Florence, Charles Mathews as Gonsalvo, William Blanchard as Bartolo, Harriet Faucit as Aldabella and Charles Connor as Falsetto. A first Dublin performance took place at the Crow Street Theatre on 6 April 1818. Fanny Kemble later played Bianca in Britain and America, where she appeared at the Park Theatre in 1832. It was revived on both sides of the Atlantic over the following decades.

== Bibliography ==
- David, Deirdre. Fanny Kemble: A Performed Life, Philadelphia. University of Pennsylvania, 2007
- Greene, John C. Theatre in Dublin, 1745-1820: A Calendar of Performances, Volume 6. Lexington Books, 2011.
- Nicoll, Allardyce. A History of Early Nineteenth Century Drama 1800-1850. Cambridge University Press, 1930.
