= Barry Cornwall =

English poet and Commissioner in Lunacy

Bryan Waller Procter
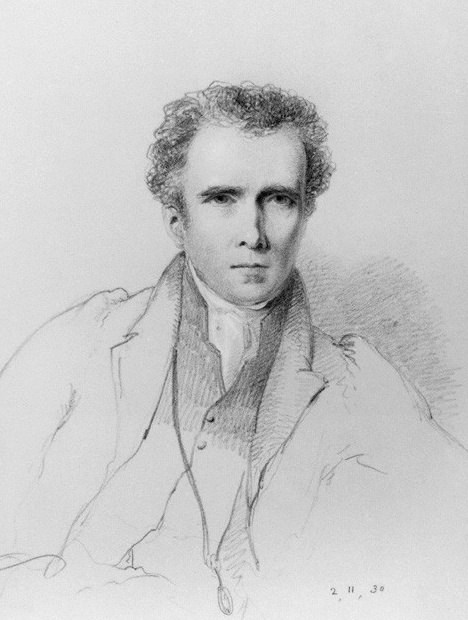
- Bryan Waller Procter in an 1830 portrait by William Brockedon
- Born: 21 November 1787; Leeds, Yorkshire, England
- Died: 5 October 1874 (aged 86); London, England
- Occupations: Poet, solicitor
- Spouse: Anne Skepper
- Children: Adelaide Anne Procter

Bryan Waller Procter (21 November 1787 – 5 October 1874), who wrote under the pseudonym Barry Cornwall, was an English poet who served as a Commissioner in Lunacy.

== Life and career ==
Born at Leeds, Yorkshire, he was educated at Harrow School, where he had for contemporaries Lord Byron and Robert Peel. On leaving school he was placed in the office of a solicitor at Calne, Wiltshire, remaining there until about 1807, when he returned to London to study law. By the death of his father in 1816 he became possessed of a small property, and soon after entered into partnership with a solicitor; but in 1820 the partnership was dissolved, and he began to write under the pseudonym of "Barry Cornwall".

After his marriage in 1824 to Anne Skepper, daughter of Mrs Basil Montague, he returned to his profession as a conveyancer, and was called to the bar in 1831. In the following year he was appointed metropolitan commissioner of lunacy—an appointment annually renewed until his election as one of the Commissioners in Lunacy constituted by the Lunacy Act 1845. He resigned in 1861. Most of his verse was composed between 1815, when he began to contribute to the Literary Gazette, and 1823, or at latest 1832. His daughter, Adelaide Anne Procter, was also a poet.

His principal poetical works were: Dramatic Scenes and other Poems (1819), A Sicilian Story (1820), Marcian Colonna (1820), Mirandola, a tragedy performed at Covent Garden with Macready, Charles Kemble and Miss Foote in the leading parts (1821), The Flood of Thessaly (1823) and English Songs (1832). He was also the author of Effigies poetica (1824), Life of Edmund Kean (1835), Essays and Tales in Prose (1851), Charles Lamb; a Memoir (1866), and of memoirs of Ben Jonson and William Shakespeare for editions of their works. A posthumous autobiographical fragment with notes of his literary friends, of whom he had a wide range from William Lisle Bowles to Robert Browning, was published in 1877, with some additions by Coventry Patmore.

The Mother's Last Song

Sleep! - The ghostly winds are blowing!
No moon abroad, no star is glowing;
The river is deep, and the tide is flowing
To the land where you and I are going!
We are going afar,
Beyond moon or star,
To the land where the sinless angels are!

I lost my heart to your heartless sire
('T was melted away by his looks of fire),
Forgot my God, and my father's ire,
All for the sake of a man's desire;
But now we'll go
Where the waters flow,
And make us a bed where none shall know.

The world is cruel, the world is untrue;
Our foes are many, our friends are few;
No work, no bread, however we sue!
What is there left for me to do,
But fly, - fly
From the cruel sky,
And hide in the deepest deeps, - and die?

— By Barry Cornwall

The Stormy Petrel

A THOUSAND miles from land are we,
Tossing about on the roaring sea, -
From billow to bounding billow cast,
Like fleecy snow on the stormy blast.
The sails are scattered abroad like weeds;
The strong masts shake like quivering reeds;
The mighty cables and iron chains,
The hull, which all earthly strength disdains, -
They strain and they crack; and hearts like stone
Their natural, hard, proud strength disown.

Up and down! - up and down!
From the base of the wave to the billow’s crown,
And amidst the flashing and feathery foam
The stormy petrel finds a home, -
A home, if such a place may be
For her who lives on the wide, wide sea,
On the craggy ice, in the frozen air,
And only seeketh her rocky lair
To warm her young, and to teach them spring
At once o’er the waves on their stormy wing!

O’er the deep! - o’er the deep!
Where the whale and the shark and the sword-fish sleep, -
Outflying the blast and the driving rain,
The petrel telleth her tale — in vain;
For the mariner curseth the warning bird
Which bringeth him news of the storm unheard!
Ah! thus does the prophet of good or ill
Meet hate from the creatures he serveth still;
Yet he ne’er falters, - so, petrel, spring
Once more o’er the waves on thy stormy wing!

— By Barry Cornwall

Charles Lamb gave the highest possible praise to his friend's Dramatic Sketches when he said that had he found them as anonymous manuscript in the Garrick Collection he would have had no hesitation about including them in his Dramatic Specimens. He was perhaps not an impartial critic. "Barry Cornwall's" songs have caught some notes from the Elizabethan and Cavalier lyrics, and blended them with others from the leading poets of his own time; and his dramatic fragments show a similar infusion of the early Victorian spirit into pre-Restoration forms and cadences. The results are varied, and lack unity, but they abound in pleasant touches, with here and there the flash of a higher, though casual, inspiration.

Relatively unknown outside Britain in his times and largely considered to be an imitator of greater romantic authors, Barry Cornwall however inspired Alexander Pushkin to some translations and imitations in 1830. Just hours before his last duel in 1837 Pushkin sent a collection by Cornwall to a fellow author, Mrs. Ishimova, suggesting that she should translate some poems selected by him.

William Makepeace Thackeray dedicated Vanity Fair to B. W. Procter. Wilkie Collins dedicated The Woman In White to B. W. Procter.

Thomas Hardy became acquainted with Procter's widow, their friendship is mentioned several times in The Early Life of Thomas Hardy (1840-1891).
