= Mirandola: a Tragedy =

Tragedy by Barry Cornwall

- Written by: Barry Cornwall
- Characters: John, duke of Mirandola; Guido, son of Giovanni; Isidora, duchess of Mirandola; Isabella, sister of Giovanni; Hypolito, son of Isabella; Casti and Julio, friends of Guido; Gheraldi, monk; Curio; Marco, innkeeper; Beatrice, wife of Marco; Pesaro, Andrea, Piero, nobles and servants
- Original language: english
- Genre: tragedy
- Setting: Mirandola, Italy

Premiere
- Date premiered: January 9, 1821
- Place premiered: Theatre Royal, Covent Garden, London

Mirandola: a Tragedy is a tragedy written by Barry Cornwall. It was staged in January 1821 at Theatre Royal in Covent Garden, London played by William Charles Macready, Charles Kemble, and Miss Foote in the leading parts.

Even though it was crushed by critics to be too similar to other tragedies, including Filippo by Vittorio Alfieri, the play achieved a great success among the audience, so much so that it was repeated sixteen times.

== Plot ==
In the preamble of the tragedy, John, Duke of Mirandola, marries a lady named Isidora, who was initially betrothed to Guido, the Duke's son. According to the deception of the monk Gheraldi (one of the main conspirators of the conspiracy), who had reported Guido's death in battle, Isidora is induced to consent to the marriage with Duke John.

The first act therefore opens with Guido's unexpected return to Mirandola, impatient to claim the love of his betrothed and unaware of the plot that took place in his absence, since all the letters between father and son had been intercepted by the monk's machinations. Once the deception was discovered, feelings of jealousy and mistrust arose between the Duke and Guido, accentuated by the attitude of Isabella, the Duke's sister, who hoped to ensure her son's succession to the Duchy of Mirandola. With his arts and the help of the notorious monk, the Duke's passions are driven to madness: he discovers Isidora together with his son Guido, and in his jealous frenzy orders the young man to be put to death. Guido's friend, who breaks in with the intercepted letters he had accidentally recovered from Gheraldi, arrives too late to save him. Duke John then dies in an agony of repentance and passion, with Isabella's diabolical schemes crowned with success. Isidora's destiny is instead left to the imagination of the spectator.

== Editions ==
- Mirandola: A Tragedy. London: Bryan Waller Procter. 1821.
- A Sicilian story and Mirandola. Garland Pub. 1977.

== See also ==
- Bryan Procter
- Duchy of Mirandola
- Castle of the Pico
