= William Macready =

English actor (1793–1873)

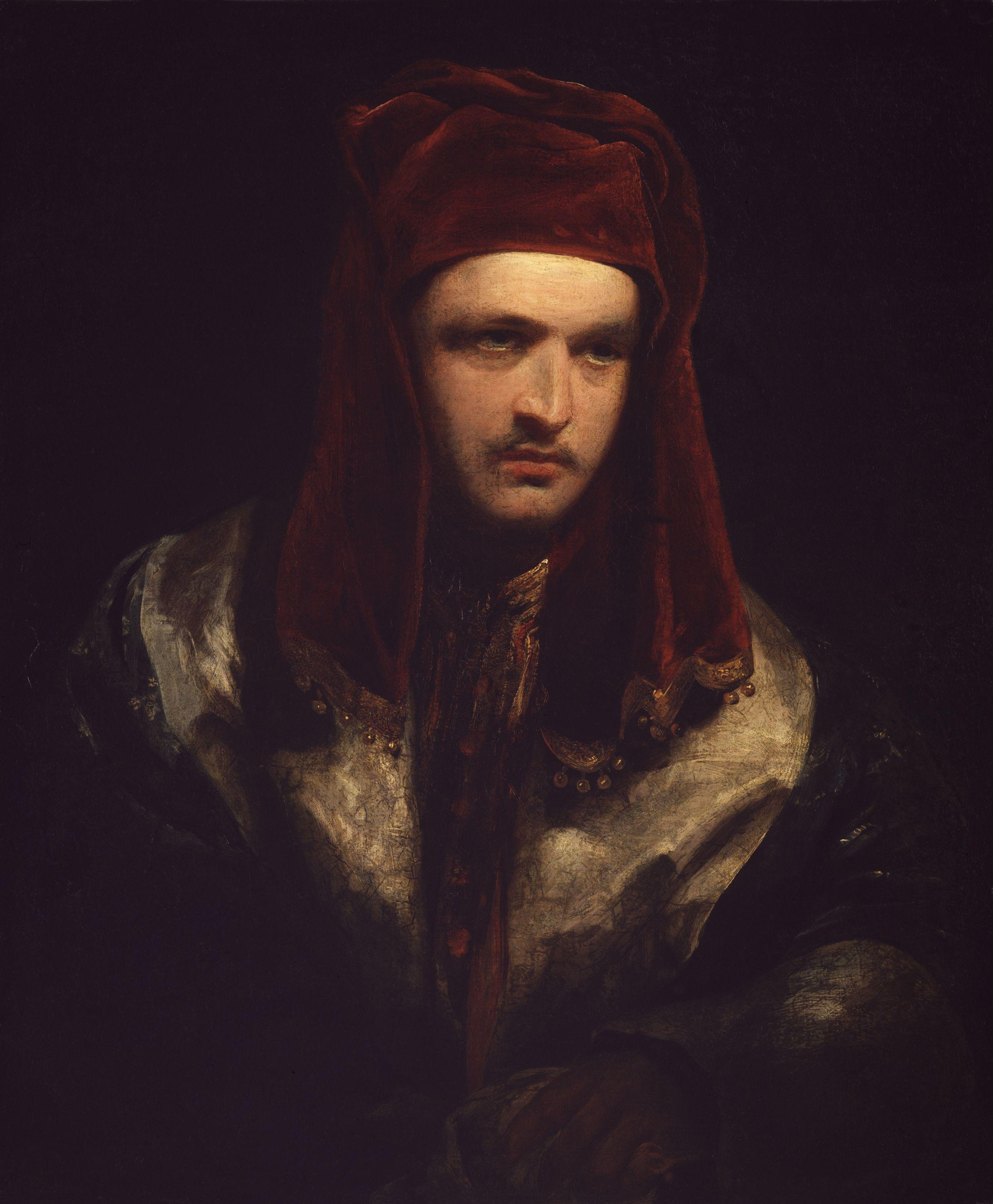
- William Macready as Henry IV by John Jackson, 1821, National Portrait Gallery
- Born: William Charles Macready; 3 March 1793; London, England
- Died: 27 April 1873 (aged 80); Cheltenham, Gloucestershire, England
- Occupation: Actor
- Years active: 1810–1851
- Spouses: Catherine Frances Atkins (1823–1852; her death); Cecile Louise Frederica Spencer (1860–1873; his death)

William Charles Macready (3 March 1793 – 27 April 1873) was an English stage actor. The son of Irish actor-manager William Macready the Elder he emerged as a leading West End performer during the Regency era.

== Career ==
Macready was born in London the son of William Macready the Elder, and actress Christina Ann Birch. Educated at Rugby School where he became head boy, and where now the theatre is named after him, it was his initial intention to go to University of Oxford, but, in 1809, financial problems experienced by his father, the lessee of several provincial theatres, called him to share the responsibilities of theatrical management. On 7 June 1810, he made a successful first appearance as Romeo at Birmingham. Other Shakespearian parts followed, but a serious rupture between father and son resulted in the young man's departure for Bath in 1814. Here he remained for two years, with occasional professional visits to other provincial towns.

On 16 September 1816, Macready made his first London appearance at Covent Garden as Orestes in The Distressed Mother, a translation of Racine's Andromaque by Ambrose Philips. Macready's choice of characters was at first confined chiefly to the romantic drama. In 1818, he won a permanent success in Isaac Pocock's (1782–1835) adaptation of Scott's Rob Roy. He showed his capacity for the highest tragedy when he played Richard III at Covent Garden on 25 October 1819.

In 1820, he played the title role in the tragedy Virginius by James Sheridan Knowles. Transferring his services to Drury Lane, he gradually rose in public favour, his most conspicuous success being in the title role of Sheridan Knowles's William Tell (11 May 1825). In 1826, he completed a successful engagement in the United States, and, in 1828, his performances met with a very flattering reception in Paris. In 1829, he appeared as Othello in Warwick.

On 15 December 1830 he appeared at Drury Lane as Werner, one of his most powerful impersonations. In 1833, he played in Antony and Cleopatra, in Byron's Sardanapalus, and in King Lear. He was responsible, in 1834, and more fully in 1838, for returning the text of King Lear to Shakespeare's text (although in a shortened version), after it had been replaced for more than a hundred and fifty years by Nahum Tate's happy-ending adaptation, The History of King Lear. He performed at the Georgian Wisbech theatre (now Angles Theatre) and other theatres of the Lincoln theatre circuit run by Fanny Robertson.

Already, Macready had done something to encourage the creation of a modern English drama, and after entering on the management of Covent Garden in 1837 he introduced Robert Browning's Strafford, and in the following year Bulwer-Lytton's The Lady of Lyons and Richelieu, the principal characters in which were among his most effective parts. On 10 June 1838, he gave a memorable performance of Henry V, for which Clarkson Stanfield prepared sketches, and the mounting was superintended by Bulwer-Lytton, Dickens, Forster, Maclise, W. J. Fox and other friends.

Dickens wrote to him in 1847: "The multitude of tokens by which I know you for a great man, the swelling within me of my love for you, the pride I have in you, the majestic reflection I see in you of the passions and affections that make up our mystery, throw me into a strange kind of transport that has no expression but in a mute sense of an attachment which in truth and fervency is worthy of its subject."

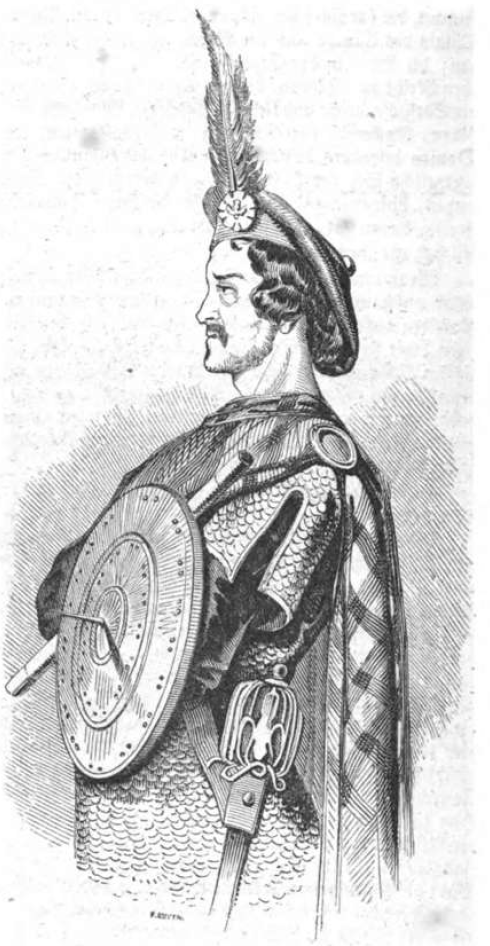
Macready playing 'Macbeth'

The first production of Bulwer-Lytton's Money took place under the artistic direction of Count d'Orsay on 8 December 1840, Macready winning unmistakable success in the character of Alfred Evelyn. Both in his management of Covent Garden, which he resigned in 1839, and of Drury Lane, which he held from 1841 to 1843, he found his designs for the elevation of the stage frustrated by the absence of adequate public support.

In 1843, he staged Cymbeline. In 1843–44, he made a successful tour in the United States, but his last visit to that country, in 1849, was marred by the Astor Place Riot, in which between 22 and 31 rioters were dead, and more than 120 people injured.

Judge Charles Patrick Daly later presided at the trial. Both Edwin Forrest and Macready were playing Macbeth in concurrent, competing productions at the time of the riot, a fact which added to the ominous reputation of that play. Playwright Richard Nelson dramatized the events surrounding the riot in his 1990 play, Two Shakespearean Actors.

Macready took leave of the stage in a farewell performance of Macbeth at Drury Lane on 26 February 1851. The remainder of his life was spent in happy retirement, and he died at Cheltenham on 27 April 1873.

== Personal life ==
Macready married twice, firstly in 1823 to Catherine Frances Atkins (died 1852). Of a numerous family of children only one son and one daughter survived. In 1860, aged 67, he married the 23 year old Cecile Louise Frederica Spencer (1827–1908), by whom he had a son, Cecil Frederick Nevil Macready, known as "Nevil", who would become a General in the British Army, and a baronet. Macready's younger brother, Major Edward Nevil Macready, commanded the Light Company of the 30th Regiment of Foot in the closing stages of the Battle of Waterloo.

Macready's daughter, Catherine Frances Macready, was a minor Victorian poet. Her book, Leaves From the Olive Mount, published by Chapman & Hall in 1860, began with a one-page dedication poem, 'To My Father'. Writer Rowena Farre (Daphne Lois Macready) was a great-granddaughter of William Macready.

Upon his death, William Macready's remains were deposited in the catacomb below the Anglican Chapel at Kensal Green Cemetery.

== Evaluation and legacy ==
According to the Encyclopædia Britannica Eleventh Edition:

Macready's performances always displayed fine artistic perceptions developed to a high degree of perfection by very comprehensive culture, and even his least successful personations had the interest resulting from thorough intellectual study. He belonged to the school of Kean rather than of Kemble; but, if his tastes were better disciplined and in some respects more refined than those of Kean, his natural temperament did not permit him to give proper effect to the great tragic parts of Shakespeare, King Lear perhaps excepted, which afforded scope for his pathos and tenderness, the qualities in which he specially excelled. With the exception of a voice of good compass and capable of very varied expression, Macready had no especial physical gifts for acting, but the defects of his face and figure cannot be said to have materially affected his success.

When Macready retired, Alfred Tennyson dedicated the following verse to him:

"Farewell, Macready, since to-night we part:
Full-handed thunders often have confessed
Thy power, well used to move the public breast.
We thank thee with one voice, and from the heart.
Farewell, Macready, since this night we part.
Go take thine honours home; rank with the best;
Garrick, and statelier Kemble, and the rest,
Who made a nation purer through their art.
Thine is it that the drama did not die.
Nor flicker down to brainless pantomime.
And those gilt gauds men-children swarm to see.
Farewell, Macready; moral, grave, sublime,
Our Shakespeare's bland and universal eye
Dwells pleased, through twice a hundred years on thee."

In 1927, the Cheltenham Local Tablets Committee placed a bronze tablet at No. 6 Wellington Square recording Macready's residence there from 1860 to 1873.

The London County Council affixed a blue plaque to Macready's birthplace, 45 Stanhope Street, Regent's Park on 25 June 1928. The house was subsequently demolished, the plaque being donated to the Theatre Museum c1965, the object passing to the V&A in 2007.

Actor Frank Barrie wrote and performed the one-man play Macready!, which was first performed in 1979 and eventually staged in 65 countries. A television adaptation of the play was broadcast on Channel 4 in 1983 as a one-hour special, again starring Frank Barrie.

== Selected roles ==
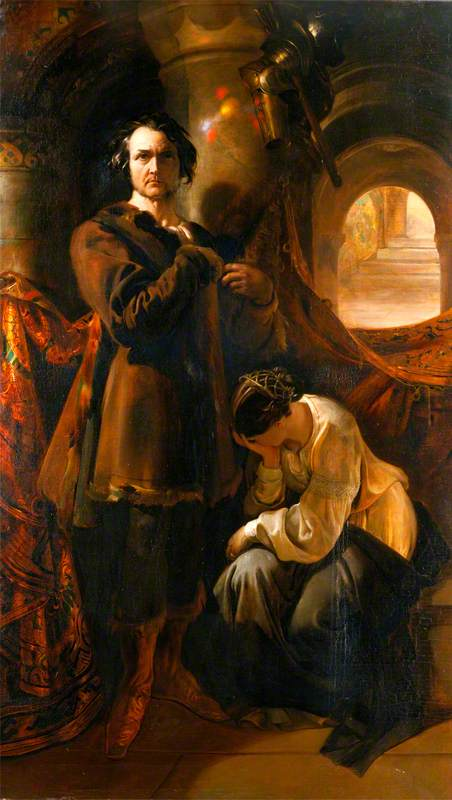
Macready as Werner by Daniel Maclise, 1850

- Emperor of Byzantium in Adelgitha by Matthew Lewis (1817)
- Valencia in The Conquest of Taranto by William Dimond (1817)
- Pescara in The Apostate by Richard Sheil (1817)
- Chosroo in Retribution by John Dillon (1818)
- Amurath in Bellamira by Richard Sheil (1818)
- Winterland in A Word to the Ladies by James Kenney (1818)
- Ludovico in Evadne by Richard Sheil (1819)
- Wallenberg in Fredolfo by Charles Maturin (1819)
- Virginius in Virginius by James Sheridan Knowles (1820)
- Wallace in Wallace by Charles Edward Walker (1820)
- Damon in Damon and Pythias by John Banim and Richard Sheil (1821)
- Duke of Mirandola in Mirandola by Barry Cornwall (1821)
- Caius Gracchus in Caius Gracchus by James Sheridan Knowles (1823)
- Julian in Julian by Mary Russell Mitford (1823)
- William Tell in William Tell by James Sheridan Knowles (1825)
- Henry in Don Pedro, King of Castile by Lord Porchester (1828)
- Don Leon in The Pledge by James Kenney (1831)
- Alfred the Great in Alfred the Great by James Sheridan Knowles (1831)
- Scroope in The Merchant of London by Thomas Serle (1832)
- Colberg in The House of Colberg by Thomas Serle (1832)
- Sardanapalus in Sardanapalus by Lord Byron (1834)
- Ion in Ion by Thomas Talfourd (1836)
- Bertulphe in The Provost of Bruges by George William Lovell (1836)
- Melantius in The Bridal by James Sheridan Knowles (1837)
- Strafford in Strafford by Robert Browning (1837)
- Marquis De Bragelone in The Duchess de la Vallière by Edward Bulwer-Lytton (1837)
- Thoas in The Athenian Captive by Thomas Talfourd (1838)
- Walsingham in Woman's Wit by James Sheridan Knowles (1838)
- Richelieu in Richelieu by Edward Bulwer-Lytton (1839)
- Richard Cromwell in Master Clarke by Thomas Serle (1840)
- Halbert MacDonald in Glencoe by Thomas Talfourd (1840)
- Earl of Ruthven in Mary Stuart by James Haynes (1840)
- Gisippus in Gisippus by Gerald Griffin (1842)
- Mordaunt in The Patrician's Daughter by John Westland Marston (1842)
- Colonel Green in The Secretary by James Sheridan Knowles (1843)

== See also ==
- Macready Theatre – theatre in Rugby named after William Macready
