= James Kenney (dramatist) =

English dramatist (1780–1849)

James Kenney, 1809, portrait by J. Heath

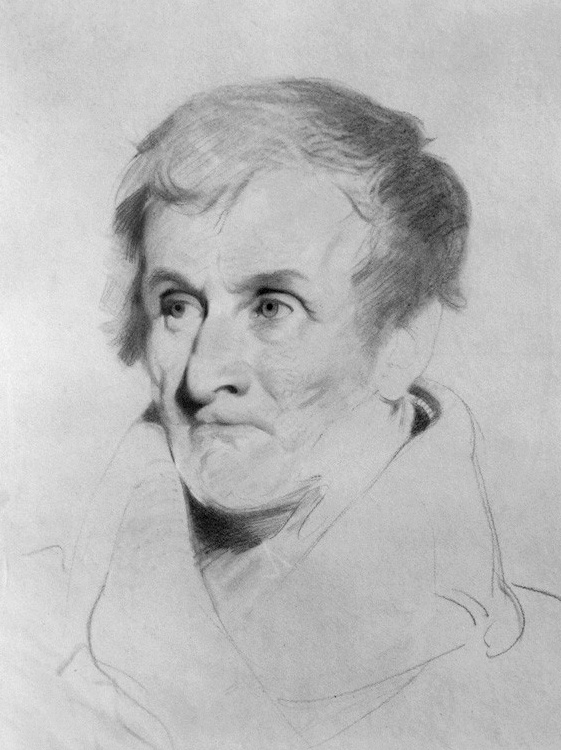
James Kenney, circa 1845, portrait by Samuel Laurence

James Kenney (1780 – 25 July 1849), an English dramatist, was the son of James Kenney, a founder of Boodles' Club in London. He produced more than 40 plays and opera libretti.

== Career ==
His first play, a farce called Raising the Wind (1803), gained success through the popularity of the character of "Jeremy Diddler". Kenney produced more than 40 plays and opera libretti between 1803 and 1845. Many, in which Mrs Siddons, Madame Vestris, Foote, Lewis, Liston and other leading players appeared from time to time, enjoyed a considerable vogue.

Kenney's most popular play was Sweethearts and Wives, produced at the Haymarket Theatre in 1823 and revived several times. Among his other works were False Alarms (1807), a comic opera with music by Braham, Love, Law and Physic (1812), Debtor and Creditor, The Touchstone (1817), A Word to the Ladies (1818), Forget and Forgive (1827), Spring and Autumn (1827), The Illustrious Stranger, or Married and Buried (1827), Masaniello (1829), The Pledge (1831) and The Sicilian Vespers, a tragedy (1840). Kenney numbered Charles Lamb and Samuel Rogers among his friends. He married the widow of the dramatist Thomas Holcroft, by whom he had two sons and two daughters. He died in London in 1849.

== Charles Lamb Kenney ==
James Kenney's second son, Charles Lamb Kenney (1823 – 25 August 1881), made a name as a journalist, dramatist and miscellaneous writer. Beginning as a clerk in the General Post Office in London, he joined the staff of The Times, as a drama critic. Having been called to the bar, he became in 1849 secretary to Ferdinand de Lesseps, and in 1857 published The Gates of the East, in support of the proposed construction of the Suez Canal.

Kenney wrote the words for a number of light operas and for several popular songs, the best known being Soft and Low (1865) and The Vagabond (1871). He also published a Memoir of M. W. Balfe (1875) and translated the Correspondence of Balzac. Thackeray and Dickens were among his friends in a literary coterie where he gained a reputation as a wit and a writer of society verse. He died in London in 1881.

== Additional resources ==
- Terry F. Robinson, "James Kenney." Dictionary of Literary Biography, Vol. 344: Nineteenth-Century British Dramatists. Detroit: Gale, 2008, pp. 206–224
- Terry F. Robinson, "James Kenney's Comedic Genius: Early Nineteenth-Century Character, Commerce, and the Arts" in Raising the Wind, The World!, and Debtor and Creditor," Literature Compass 3.5 (August 2006) pp. 1082–1106
