= Richard Lalor Sheil =

Irish politician, writer and orator

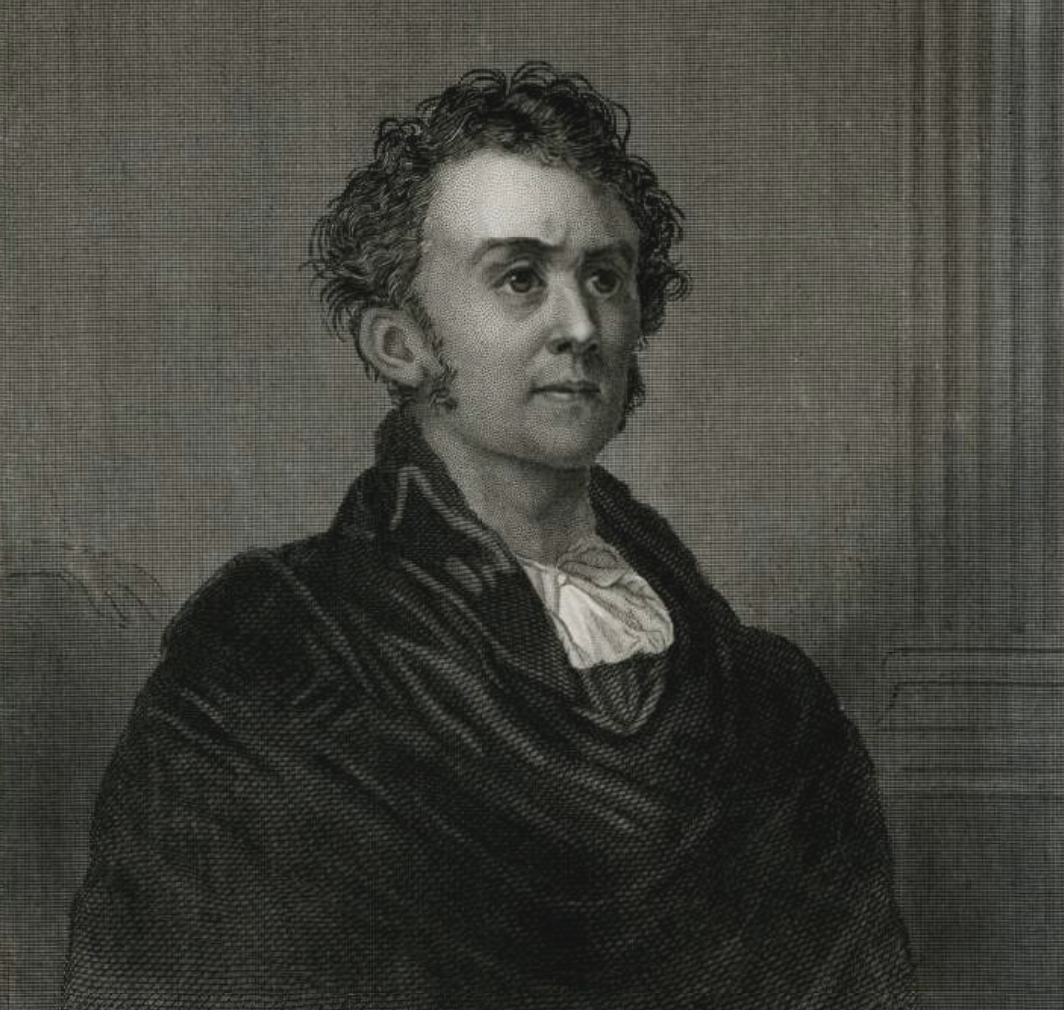
- Born: 17 August 1791; Drumdowney, Slieverue, Ireland
- Died: 23 May 1851 (aged 59); Florence, Italy
- Resting place: Long Orchard, near Templetuohy, Ireland
- Education: Stonyhurst College; Trinity College Dublin
- Occupations: politician, writer, orator
- Known for: MP (1831–1851), author of several plays
- Notable work: Adelaide, or the Emigrants, The Apostate
- Spouse(s): Miss O'Halloran, (m. 1816; died 1822)
- Children: 1 son
- Parents: Edward Sheil (father); Catherine McCarthy (mother)
- Relatives: Justin Sheil (brother)

Richard Lalor Sheil (17 August 1791 – 23 May 1851) was an Irish politician, writer and orator. The family was temporarily domiciled at Drumdowney while their new mansion at Bellevue, near Waterford, was under construction.

== Life ==
He was born on 17 August 1791 in Drumdowney, Slieverue, County Kilkenny, Ireland. His father was Edward Sheil, who had acquired considerable wealth in Cádiz in southern Spain and owned an estate in County Tipperary. His mother was Catherine McCarthy of Springhouse, near Bansha, County Tipperary, a member of the old aristocratic family of MacCarthy Reagh of Springhouse, who in their time were Princes of Carbery and Counts Mac-Carthy Reagh in France. The son was taught French and Latin by the Abbé de Grimeau, a French refugee. He was then sent to a Catholic school in Kensington, London, presided over by a French nobleman, M. de Broglie. For a time he attended the lay college in St Patrick's College, Maynooth. In October 1804, he was removed to Stonyhurst College, Lancashire, and in November 1807 entered Trinity College Dublin, where he specially distinguished himself in the debates of the College Historical Society.

After taking his degree in 1811 he was admitted a student of Lincoln's Inn, and was called to the Irish bar in 1814. Sheil was one of the founders of the Catholic Association in 1823 and drew up the petition for inquiry into the mode of administering the laws in Ireland, which was presented in that year to both Houses of Parliament.

In 1825, Sheil accompanied Daniel O'Connell to London to protest against the suppression of the Catholic Association. The protest was unsuccessful, but, although nominally dissolved, the association continued its propaganda after the defeat of the Catholic Relief Bill in 1825. Sheil was one of O'Connell's leading supporters in the agitation persistently carried on until Catholic emancipation was granted in 1829.

In the same year he was returned to Parliament for Milborne Port, and in 1831 for Louth, holding that seat until 1832. He took a prominent part in all the debates relating to Ireland, and although he was greater as a platform orator than as a debater, he gradually won the somewhat reluctant admiration of the House. In August 1839, he became Vice-President of the Board of Trade in Lord Melbourne's ministry.

After the accession of Lord John Russell to power in 1846, he was appointed Master of the Mint, and in 1850 he was appointed minister at the court of Tuscany. He died in Florence on 23 May 1851. His remains were conveyed back to Ireland by a British ship-of-war, and interred at Long Orchard, near Templetuohy, County Tipperary.

George W. E. Russell said of him:

Sheil was very small, and of mean presence; with a singularly fidgety manner, a shrill voice, and a delivery unintelligibly rapid. But in sheer beauty of elaborated diction not O'Connell nor any one else could surpass him.

== Works ==
Shiel's play, Adelaide, or the Emigrants, was performed at the Crow Street Theatre in Dublin, on 19 February 1814, with success, and, on 23 May 1816, it was performed at Covent Garden in London. The Apostate, produced at the latter theatre on 3 May 1817, established his reputation as a dramatist. His other principal plays are Bellamira (written in 1818), Evadne (1819), Damon and Pythias (1821), Huguenot (produced in 1822) and Montini (1820).

In 1822, Sheil began, with William Henry Curran, to contribute to the New Monthly Magazine a series of papers entitled "Sketches of the Irish Bar". Curran in fact did most of the writing. These pieces were edited by Marmion Wilme Savage in 1855 in two volumes, under the title of Sketches Legal and Political. Sheil's Speeches were edited in 1845 by Thomas MacNevin.

== Family ==
In 1816, Sheil married a Miss O'Halloran, niece of Sir William MacMahon, Master of the Rolls in Ireland. They had one son, who predeceased Sheil. His wife died in January 1822. In July 1830, he married Anastasia Lalor Power, a widow. He then added the middle name Lalor.

His younger brother was the army officer and diplomat Justin Sheil.

Parliament of the United Kingdom
Preceded by George Stevens Byng; William Sturges Bourne	Member of Parliament for Milborne Port; 1831; With: William Sturges Bourne 1831; George Stevens Byng 1831	Succeeded by George Stevens Byng; Philip Cecil Crampton
Preceded by Alexander Dawson; John McClintock	Member of Parliament for County Louth; 1831–1832; With: Alexander Dawson 1831; Sir Patrick Bellew, Bt 1831–1832	Succeeded by Thomas FitzGerald; Richard Bellew
Preceded by Thomas Wyse; Robert Otway-Cave	Member of Parliament for County Tipperary; 1832–1841; With: Cornelius O'Callaghan 1832–1835; Robert Otway-Cave 1835–1841	Succeeded by Robert Otway-Cave; Valentine Maher
Preceded by Cornelius O'Callaghan	Member of Parliament for Dungarvan; 1841–1851	Succeeded by Charles Ponsonby
Political offices
Preceded by Henry Labouchere	Vice-President of the Board of Trade; 1839–1841	Succeeded by Fox Maule
Preceded by Sir George Clerk, Bt	Master of the Mint; 1846–1850	Succeeded by Sir John Herschel, Bt
Diplomatic posts
Preceded by Sir George Hamilton	British Minister to Tuscany; 1850–1851	Succeeded by James Hudson
