= Opera in Scotland =

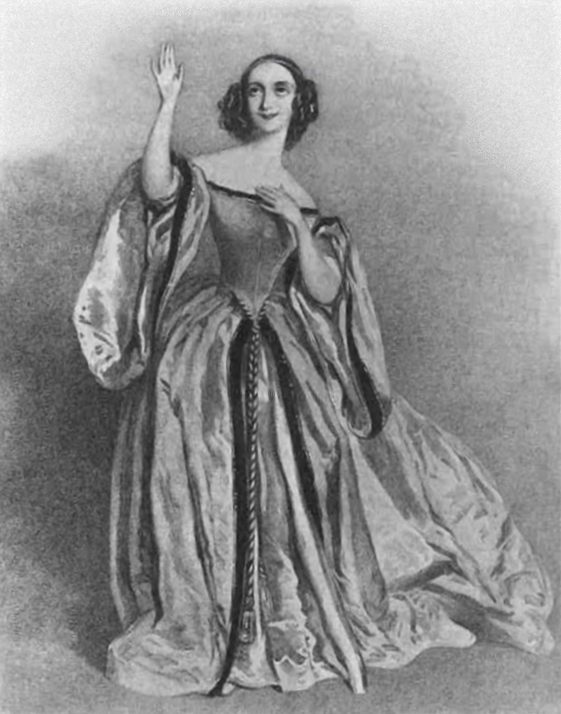
Fanny Tacchinardi Persiani as Lucia in the London premiere of Lucia di Lammermoor, perhaps the best known opera on a Scottish theme.

Scottish opera is a subgenre of Scottish music. This article deals with three separate, but overlapping subjects:

- Opera on Scottish themes, subject matter, or inspired by Scottish writers
- Opera by Scottish (-based) composers
- Opera in Scotland, including performers, production personnel, and opera companies, etc.

A number of operas have been set in Scotland, or based around Scottish themes, but the number of notable operas written by Scots is far lower. Their actual connection to Scotland varies greatly.

Searching for its typical and characteristic features, Scottish opera (and Scottish classical music as a whole), has often been under strong foreign influence. Italian, French, English and German operas have served as models, even when composers sought to introduce characteristically national elements into their work. This dualism, to a greater or lesser degree, has persisted throughout the whole history of Scottish opera.

The Italian style of classical music was probably first brought to Scotland by the Italian cellist and composer Lorenzo Bocchi, who travelled to Scotland in the 1720s, introducing the cello to the country and then developing settings for lowland Scots songs. He possibly had a hand in the first Scottish Opera, the pastoral The Gentle Shepherd, with libretto by the poet Allan Ramsay.

The most significant figure in Scottish classical music of the mid-eighteenth century was Thomas Erskine, 6th Earl of Kellie (1732–81), whose chamber music was frequently performed at the time, but quickly forgotten after his death and has only just begun to be reappraised. Growing audiences for classical music can be seen from the drawing up of a constitution for The Musical Society of Edinburgh in 1728 and the opening of a new 2,200 square feet, oval concert hall for the Society in the shape of St Cecilia's Hall, Niddry Street, Edinburgh, in 1762.

From the late-Victorian period onwards, opera-loving Scots had to make do with the offerings of small or family-based companies that toured extensively throughout the British Isles. What the standards were like in those days long before recording can only be imagined. However the creation in 1873 of the Liverpool-based Carl Rosa Opera Company was hailed at the time as offering touring opera of an ambition and standard never before seen in Scotland. Perhaps the most detailed account of the travelling opera phenomenon of that time is offered by Rodmell. Clearly this exposure to travelling opera must have done a significant amount to form public taste.

However, despite the impressive strides in historical research that have been made here and elsewhere, the quantity of performances and companies in Scotland is not known in much detail. Establishing the facts is labour-intensive and problematic. Digitisation of newspapers, magazines and other print media helps researchers in some respects but nationally this process is still a long way from being complete. Performing companies and even theatres have mainly been temporary phenomena and their performance records are almost always lost. The best archives are found where companies or venues have not only survived, but maintained their own records. Prominent musical examples are in New York the Metropolitan Opera; and in London the Royal Opera House, Covent Garden, and the Royal Albert Hall.

Memoirs, even those of impresarios, tend to be long in anecdote and short of detail. Little or nothing survives of their business records to enable estimates of attendance, for example. National and local libraries and even specialist archives of performing arts material tend to hold only a haphazard handful of programmes or other memorabilia.

For Scotland the task is more challenging. Attempts must therefore be made to identify and build the detail of early performances and casts using mainly newspaper reviews, programmes and playbills. An ambitious attempt to pursue this online, and unique in trying to work nationally rather than in relation to a single company, is that of OperaScotland, a website for listings and performance history. Current content runs from 1755 to the present day, includes 650 operas and the names of over 11,000 performers. Much remains to be found, however.

== Operas on Scottish themes or subjects ==
Professor Alexander Weatherson, writing in the February 2009 Donizetti Society Newsletter, notes the following (with the addition of relevant opera titles associated with the named composers):

Scotland's soil was about to be profaned by a stream of operas that bore the footprint of [ Elizabeth's ] rival......without Mary Stuart, Scotland might have been left in peace....In Italy alone in the earliest decades of the nineteenth century there was a Scotch broth of operas by Asap; Capecelatro [Davide Rizzio]; Carafa [I solitari di Scozia, 1815, and Elisabetta in Derbyshire ossia Il castello di Fotheringhay, 1818]; Carlini [Maria Stuarda, regina di Scozia, 1818]; Casalini; Casella [Maria Stuarda, 1812]; Coccia [I solitari, 1811, and Maria Stuart, regina di Scozia, 1827]; Donizetti [the subject of the Newsletter article]; Ferrari; [The Belgian], Fétis [Marie Stuart en Ecosse]; Gabrielli [Sara ovvero La pazza delle montagne di Scozia, 1843]; Mazzucato [La fidanzata di Lammermoor, 1834]; Mercadante [Maria Stuarda, regina di Scozia, 1825]; Niedermeyer [Marie Stuart, Paris 1844]; Nicolini; Pacini [Vallace, 1820, Malvina di Scozia]; Pavesi; Pugni; Rajentroph; the Ricchis [ Federico Ricci and Luigi Ricci ] [La prigione di Edimburgo, 1838]; Rossini [Elisabetta, regina d'Inghilterra, 1815]; Sogner [Maria Stuarda ossia I carbonari di Scozia, 1814]; and Vaccai [I solitari di Scozia, 1815] – and this is just a scratch upon the surface of the European infatuation with the decapitated Stuart and/or her northern fastness which boiled-up in the bloodbath finale of the eighteenth century, operas often rabid and inconsequential, full of fashionable confrontations and artificial conflicts, politically motivated, repetitious and soon forgotten.

Other notable non-Scottish composers of operas on Scottish subjects include Bizet, Handel, Giacomo Meyerbeer, Jean-François Le Sueur, John Barnett and Giuseppe Verdi. Richard Wagner originally set the action of his music drama The Flying Dutchman in Scotland, but changed the location to Norway shortly before its premiere staged in Dresden in January 1843.

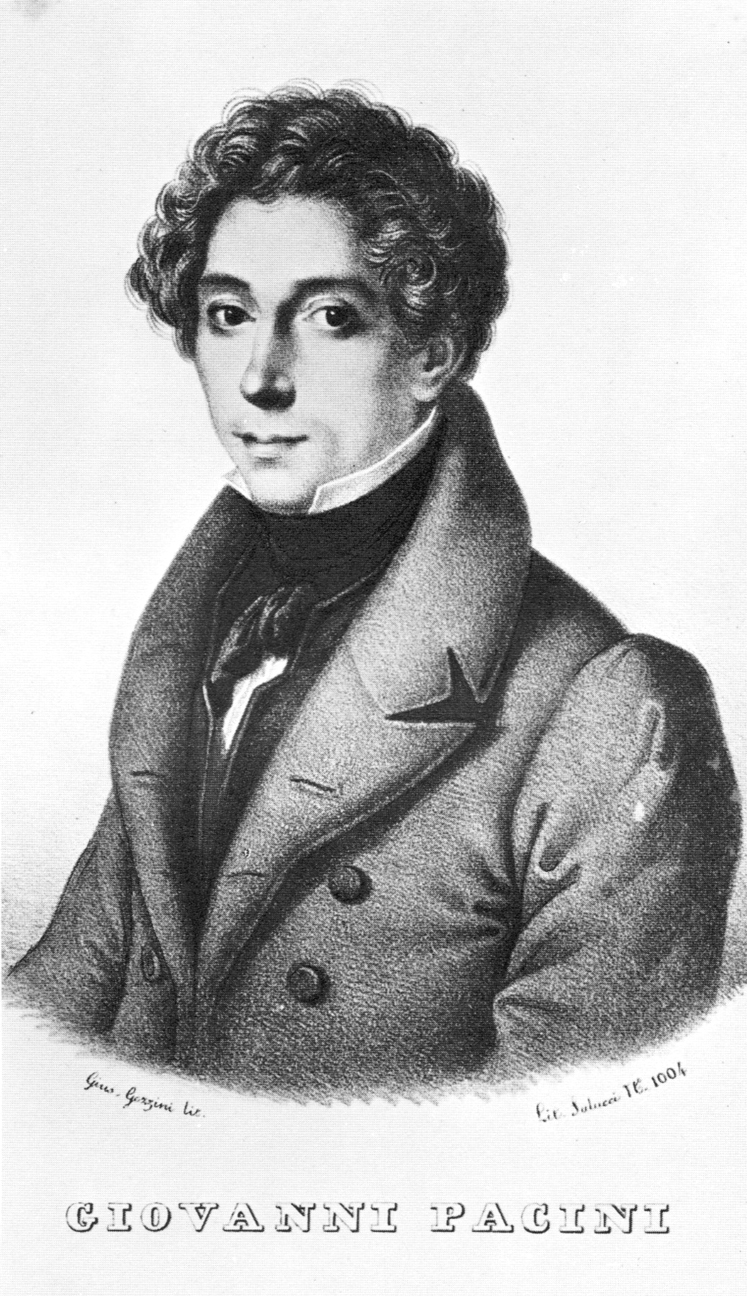
Giovanni Pacini

- Barnett, John – The Mountain Sylph
- Carafa, Michele – I solitari di Scozia 1815, La prison d'Édimbourg (1833)
- Casalini
- Coccia, Carlo – I solitari 1811; Edoardo in Iscozia (o Edoardo Stuart re in Iscozia)
- Ferrari, [The Belgian]
- Gabrielli, Nicolò – Sara ovvero La pazza delle montagne di Scozia, 1843
- Handel's – Ariodante
- Marschner, Heinrich – Der Vampyr
- Meyerbeer, Giacomo – Margherita d'Anjou
- Nicolini, Giuseppe
- Pacini – Vallace, 1820 (about William Wallace), Allan Cameron and Malvina di Scozia
- Pavesi, Stefano
- Pugni, Cesare – Ricciarda di Edimburgo (Melodramma serio in 2 acts, libretto by Callisto Bassi). Teatro Grande, Trieste, 29 September 1832.
- Rossini and Louis Niedermeyer – Robert Bruce, pastiche opera
- Vaccai, Nicola – I solitari di Scozia, 1815, Malvina
- Verdi – Aroldo (1857) A revision of his 1850 Stiffelio with a Scottish setting, and "some hints from Walter Scott".

There is also Pacini's Maria, regina d'Inghilterra of 1843 which is about Mary I of England (Mary Tudor).

But Weatherson concludes:

At the heart of the plot, however, lay an Italian, the pulp plays and novels of Camillo Federici (1749–1802) [the pen name of Giovanni Battista Viassolo] a former actor whose prolific vulgarisations of Schiller and Kotzebue set Italian librettists scribbling for four decades. Indeed, without him it is to be suspected that Sir Walter Scott would never have captured the imagination of so many poets, nor for so long.

=== Mary, Queen of Scots ===
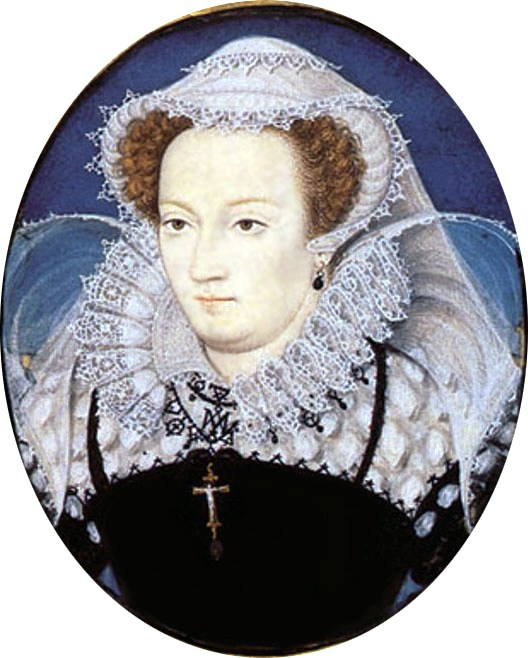
Queen Mary in captivity, by Nicholas Hilliard, c. 1578. She was a regular topic of 19th-century European opera.

The subject of Mary, Queen of Scots was a common one. Usually the operas dealt with the section of her life when she was being persecuted by Elizabeth I of England. She was considered a sympathetic character in southern Europe due to her Catholicism.

In a 2001 article, "Mary Stuart and the opera in her honour by Carlo Coccia", Professor Alexander Weatherson writes:

No one could complain that Italy had ever abandoned Mary Stuart. Theatrically speaking she had shown a marked resilience but not really on account of her spiritual perfection. It was as a political symbol that she had captured the imagination of Italian radicals and their kith and kin. In the earliest years of the nineteenth century performances of Alfieri's (1780) and Schiller's (1801) far-fetched historical plays staged in her honour rubbed shoulders with a lesser political layer. Thus a dim "Maria Stuarda restituita dai Carbonari", for example, a rag-bag of fact and fiction that somehow managed to bridge the gap between fervent Catholicism and Jacobin wishful-thinking, found a place among a host of similar popularist plays that included August Friedrich Ferdinand von Kotzebue's "Edoardo Stuart in Scozia" and the screaming tabloids "Il principe Eugenio all'assedio di Tamisvar" and "Il trionfo di Napoleone il Grande" aimed directly at a credulous public. They shared the footlights with an even more imaginative "Matilde ossia I Carbonari" in 1809 – which presented the unhappy queen with a fictitious daughter (who too would figure, rather later, in Rossini's "Elisabetta regina d'Inghilterra" but shorn of any disloyal aspects) – as well as a cut-price "I carbonari di Dombar" (i.e. Dunbar) of similar construction.

All these ephemeral plays had something in common, and were favoured by a dissident public. Needless to say, it was not long before this "Jacobin" Queen of Scotland was given a musical setting: Pietro Casella's "Maria Stuarda" (Florence, April 1812) was prudent enough, but Pasquale Sogner's "Maria Stuarda ossia I carbonari di Scozia" (Venice, 26 December 1814) – omitting to name the poet – sparked-off a political row, which was soon stamped-out by the newly installed Austrians in Venice who put a stop to all such provocation, as they saw it to be. When the Neapolitan Michele Carafa staged his "Elisabetta in Derbyshire ossia Il castello di Fotheringhay" with a libretto by Antonio Peracchi at La Fenice on 26 December 1818 (based upon Schiller), the maestro took care not to upset anyone with either its title or its text (only with some of its spelling), while Saverio Mercadante, whose "Maria Stuarda, regina di Scozia" with a text by the Venice-based Gaetano Rossi (Bologna, 29 May 1821), though not more than obliquely dependent upon these sources, took care accordingly to stage it as far away from Naples as possible.

Other depictions in opera

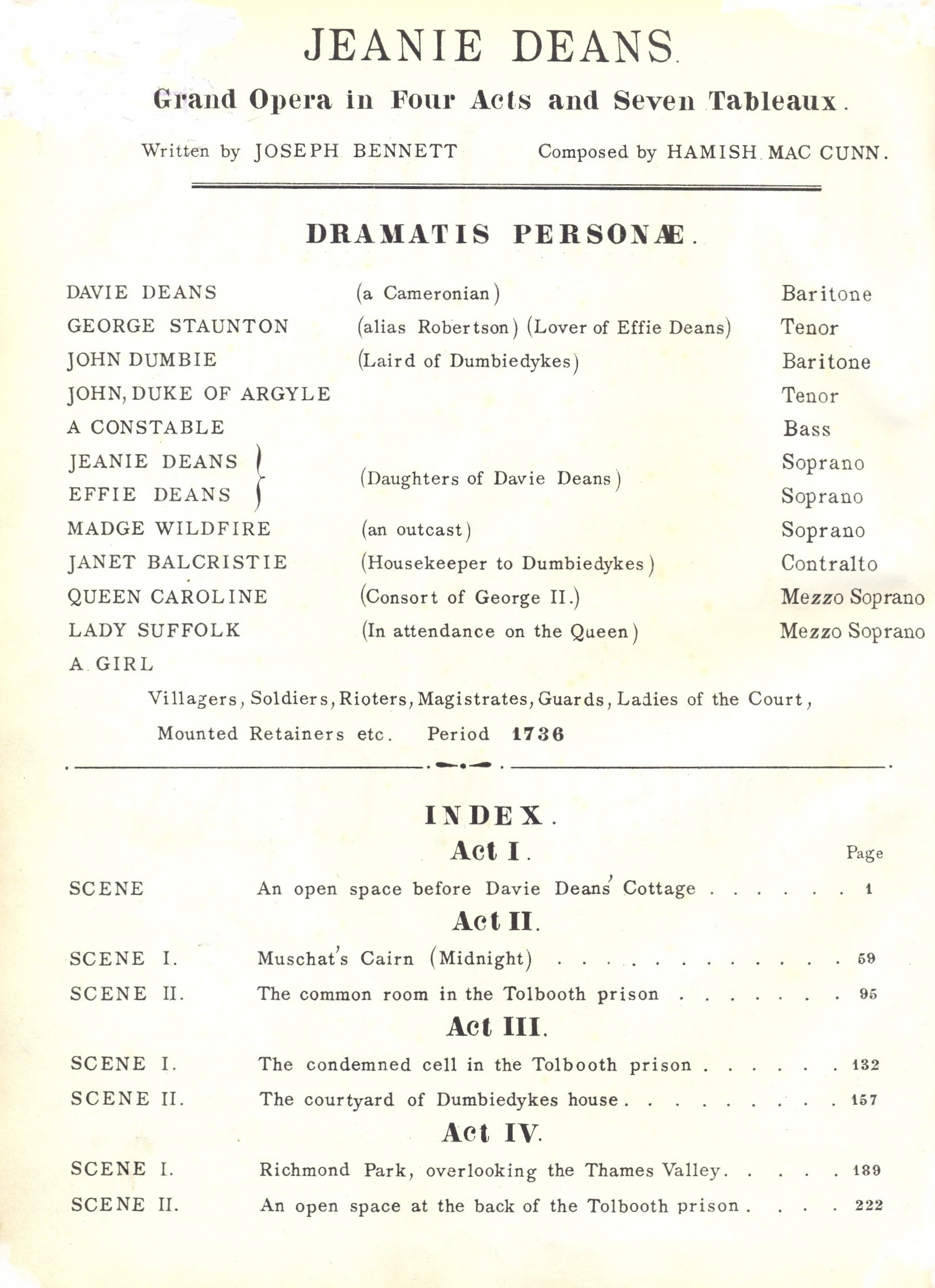
Cast list and contents of the opera, Jeanie Deans

- Capecelatro, Vincenzo David Riccio : 2-act drama, with prologue (1849) music by (1850) (David Rizzio)
- Carlini – Maria Stuarda, regina di Scozia, 1818
- Casella – Maria Stuarda, 1812
- Coccia, Carlo Maria Stuart, regina di Scozia, 1827
- Donizetti – Maria Stuarda
- Fétis, François-Joseph – Marie Stuart en Ecosse
- Mercadante, Saverio – Maria Stuarda, regina di Scozia, 1825
- Musgrave, Thea – Mary, Queen of Scots 1977.
- Neidermeyer, Louis – Marie Stuart, Paris 1844
- Sogner, Pasquale – Maria Stuarda ossia I carbonari di Scozia, 1814

Rossini's Elisabetta, regina d'Inghilterra, 1815, does not deal directly with Queen Mary, but does has several Scottish characters in it, and also relatives of the Scottish queen.

=== Operas inspired by Walter Scott ===
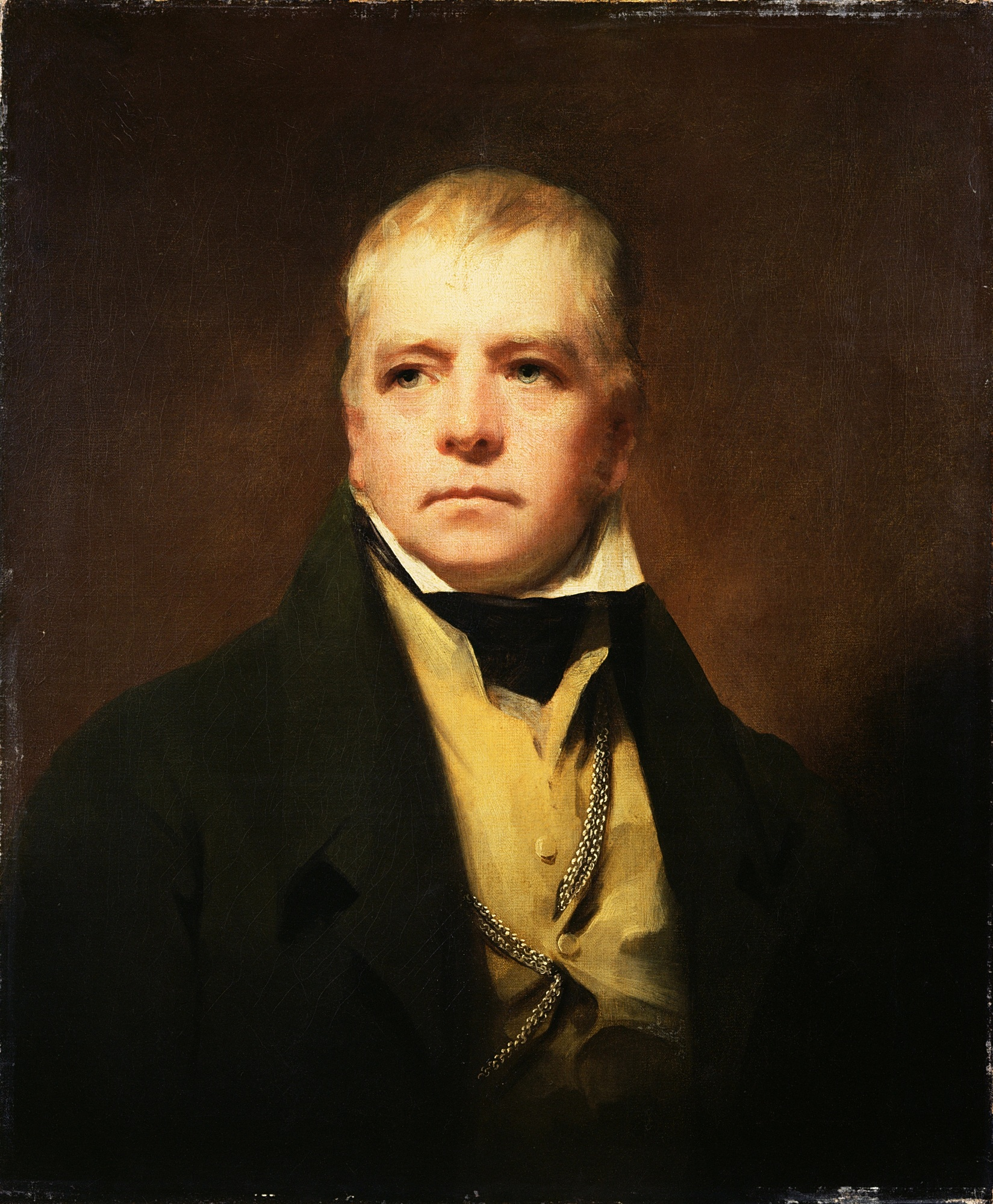
Portrait of Sir Walter Scott by Henry Raeburn, 1823

The works of Walter Scott proved popular with nineteenth-century composers, and "the Scottish play" Macbeth by English playwright William Shakespeare has also been adapted several times.

Walter Scott's influence on the European literature of his time is frequently forgotten. Currently unfashionable and largely neglected, Scott influenced opera and historical novels, and authors like Tolstoy. Most of the works are based on Scott's novels rather than his poetry:

- Bizet – La jolie fille de Perth
- Boieldieu, François-Adrien – La dame blanche (based on several works by Scott)
- Carafa, Michele – Le nozze di Lammermoor (1829) (The Bride of Lammermoor)
- Donizetti's Lucia di Lammermoor (The Bride of Lammermoor)
- Donizetti's Il castello di Kenilworth (1829) (Kenilworth)
- MacCunn, Hamish – Jeanie Deans (Heart of Midlothian)
- Mazzucato, Alberto La fidanzata di Lammermoor (1834) (The Bride of Lammermoor)
- Ricci, Federico and Luigi Ricci – La prigione di Edimburgo (1838) (Heart of Midlothian)
- Rossini, Gioachino – La donna del lago, based on the poem (The Lady of the Lake)

Rossini, Pacini, and Sir Arthur Sullivan (Ivanhoe, 1891) created operas based on the novel Ivanhoe. The opera by Rossini is a pasticcio, assembled without the composer's input. Another important Ivanhoe-based opera is Nicolai's Der Templer und die Juedin. A list of over forty stage works based on this novel may be found in an appendix of Jeff Dailey's study of Sullivan's opera.

=== Macbeth ===
Macbeth was a genuine historical figure: Mac Bethad mac Findlaích (Modern Gaelic: MacBheatha mac Fhionnlaigh), anglicised as Macbeth, and nicknamed "Rí Deircc" (Righ Dearg), "the Scarlet King"; died 15 August 1057) was King of the Scots (also known as the King of Alba, and earlier as King of Moray and King of Fortriu) from 1040 until his death. He is best known as the subject of William Shakespeare's tragedy Macbeth and the many works it has inspired, although the play presents a highly inaccurate picture of his reign and personality. Shakespeare borrowed the story from several tales in Holinshed's Chronicles, a popular history of the British Isles known to Shakespeare and his contemporaries, but with numerous inaccuracies and biases.

- Macbeth (1847) by Giuseppe Verdi
- Macbeth (1910) by Ernest Bloch
- Macbeth, 1989 opera by Antonio Bibalo
- Macbeth, Tre atti senza nome, 2002 opera by Salvatore Sciarrino

=== James Macpherson's Ossian cycle ===
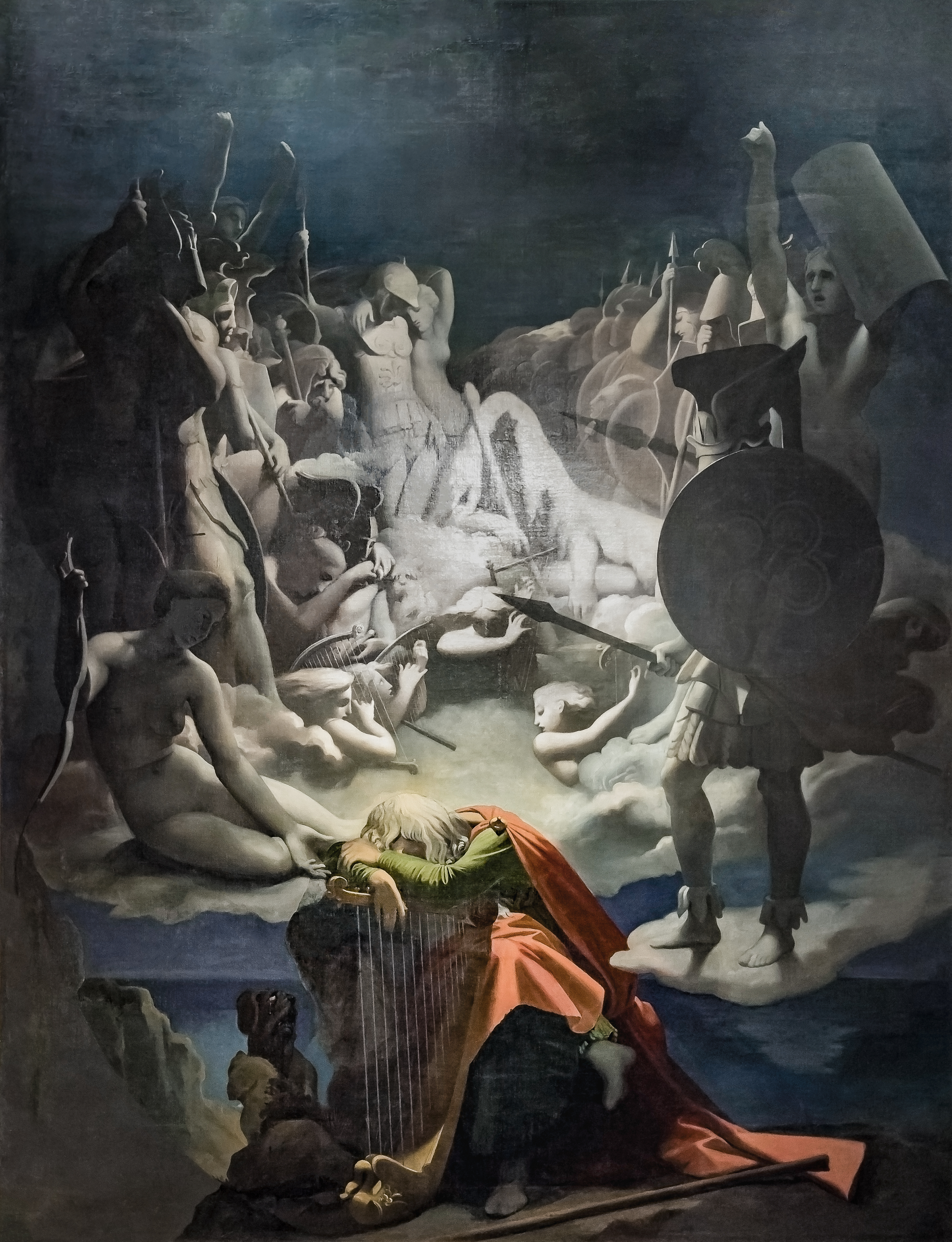
Ossian's Dream, Jean Auguste Dominique Ingres, 1813

In 1760 Macpherson published the English-language text Fragments of ancient poetry, collected in the Highlands of Scotland, and translated from the Gaelic or Erse language. Later that year Macpherson announced that he had obtained further manuscripts of ancient Gaelic poetry and in 1761 reported his discovery of an epic on the subject of the hero Fingal, said to be the work of a blind Celtic bard named Ossian. Although Macpherson claimed the poems were based on the orally transmitted tradition of Gaelic folklore, he could not, when challenged, produce original material in the form of transcriptions and the manuscripts he claimed to have, to silence doubters like Samuel Johnson who believed he was a fraud.

Fingal achieved international success. Napoleon and Thomas Jefferson were great admirers of the work. It was proclaimed a Celtic equivalent of the work of the Classical poets and its unknown author likened to Homer. Many writers were influenced by the poem, including the young Walter Scott, and several painters and composers depicted Ossianic subjects.

The opera Ossian, ou Les bardes by Le Sueur was a sell-out at the Paris Opera in 1804, and transformed his career. This led to its influence on Napoleon and Girodet's 1805 painting Ossian receiving the Ghosts of the French Heroes.

Other characters in the cycle, including Malvina (Mala Mhin), who has at least two operas based around her:

- Pacini – Malvina di Scozia
- Vaccai – Malvina

== Operas by Scots ==
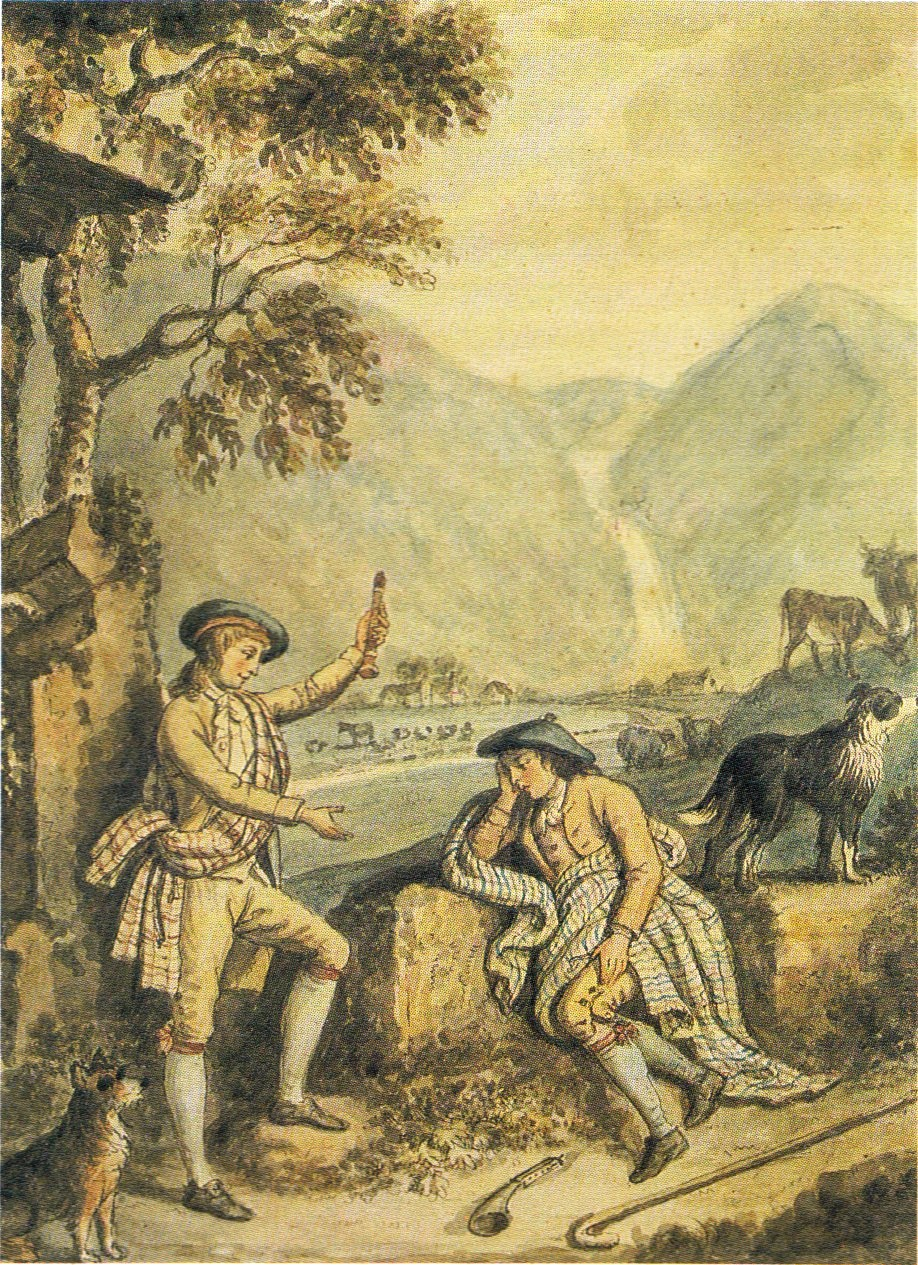
The opening scene of Allan Ramsay's The Gentle Shepherd by David Allan (1744–96)

Opera was a late starter in Scotland. Originating in Italy, c. 1600, where it was fostered under courtly patronage, the art form eventually spread over most of western Europe and beyond. However, the 17th and early 18th centuries were a tumultuous period in Scottish history. Not only was the country riven, first by religious conflict and later Jacobitism, but the departure of court and parliament to London removed potential sources of support and patronage. Theatre did not flourish in this period either. John Home's Douglas was heavily criticised by the more traditionally minded elements within the Church of Scotland. This held back the development of a Scottish theatre tradition which could have supported opera. Johnson pointed to other possible reasons including the relative poverty of Scotland. The traditionally Calvinistic outlook of the Scottish middle class in the Victorian era, which frowned upon public entertainments in pursuit of pleasure and promoted thrift, not ostentation, may also have inhibited the kind of municipal patronage which enabled opera's transition from a predominantly aristocratic art form to one increasingly patronised by the bourgeoisie in 19th-century Europe.

Two main composers stand out in the 19th century, and early twentieth – the first being Hamish MacCunn who wrote Jeanie Deans in 1894, commissioned by Carl Rosa. This he followed by Diarmid 1897, Prue, (unfinished) 1904, The Golden Girl, 1905, and Breast of Light (unfinished). Like many talented Scots he was soon drawn to study and develop his creative career south of the border. McCunn is best known for his non-operatic piece Land of the Mountain and the Flood. Excerpts from Jeanie Deans have been recorded. The other figure is William Wallace, whose 1896 piece Brassolis is a lyrical tragedy in one act. Again, like McCunn, he was mainly an orchestral, and non-operatic composer. In the following generation, we find John Blackwood McEwen writing The Royal Rebel, a Comic Opera in 3 acts (1909).

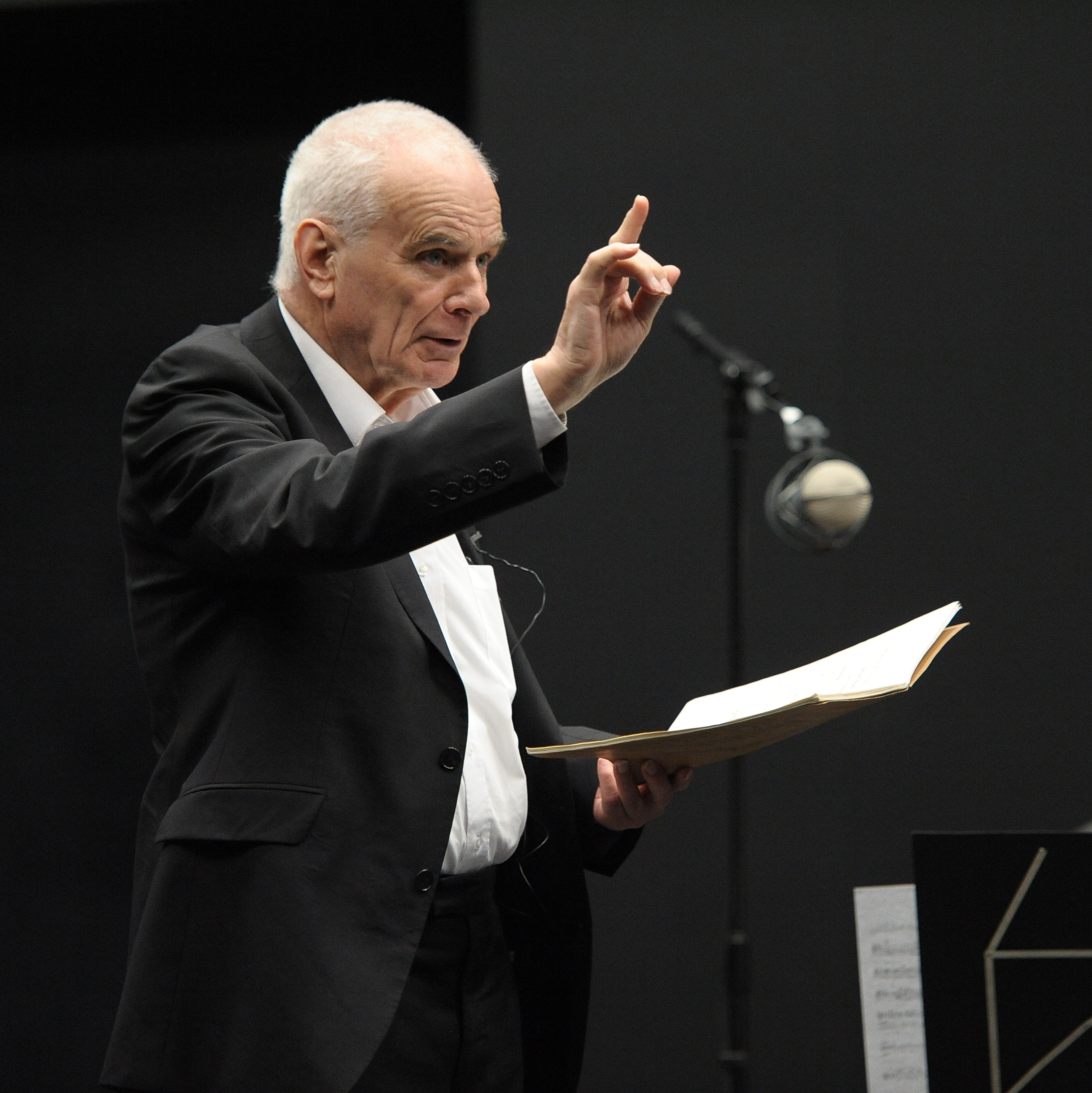
Expat composer, Peter Maxwell Davies

Later twentieth-century Scottish opera composers include two surprises – namely the unusual number of female composers, and secondly, Scottish Gaelic opera (see below). Thomas Wilson's opera, the Confessions of a Justified Sinner, was commissioned by Scottish Opera and based on the novel by James Hogg. It was premiered in York in 1976 and toured throughout the UK. It received seventeen performances and was highly regarded for its mixture of surrealism, pastiche and electronics. Before that Wilson had written a one act opera, The Charcoal Burner, with a libretto by Edwin Morgan. Perhaps the best known opera composer resident in Scotland was Peter Maxwell Davies. Davies, an Englishman, lived in Orkney from 1971 until his death in 2016. Some of his works take Scottish themes, but as often they do not. His Scottish based works include The Martyrdom of St Magnus, a chamber opera, and The Lighthouse (about the Flannan Isles incident). Non-Scottish based operas by Davies include Mr Emmet Takes a Walk, Kommilitonen!, The Doctor of Myddfai, Cinderella and Resurrection.

Another major composer, with a questionable Scottish background is Judith Weir. In 2014 she was appointed Master of the Queen's Music, following on from Davies and becoming the first woman to hold this honorary role. Weir is of English birth, but Scottish heritage, and has worked both north and south of the border. She has used Scottish material in her opera, The Vanishing Bridegroom. Commissioned by the Glasgow District Council, the opera was premiered by the Scottish Opera as a part of the 1990 European Capital of Culture celebrations in Glasgow.

John Purser has written two operas, The Undertaker and The Bell.

In the second half of the twentieth century, Thea Musgrave has been particularly prolific, and her works include:

- The Abbot of Drimock (1955)
- Marko the Miser (1962)
- The Decision (1965)
- The Voice of Ariadne (1972)
- Mary, Queen of Scots (1977)
- A Christmas Carol (1979)
- An Occurrence at Owl Creek Bridge (1981)
- Harriet, the Woman called 'Moses (1984)
- Simón Bolívar (1992)
- Pontalba (2003)

The composer and controversialist, James MacMillan has also written several operas – Inés de Castro (libretto: John Clifford – 1991–95), The Sacrifice (opera) and Clemency.

The Scottish composer Julian Wagstaff has written and produced two chamber operas informed by scientific subject matter, namely The Turing Test (2007) and Breathe Freely (2013), the latter produced with the support of Scottish Opera.

In 2007, Alex Reedijk, the General Director of Scottish Opera initiated experimental pairings of composers and writers with little or no previous experience of opera to create short 15-minute chamber operas. The "Five:15 Operas Made in Scotland" ran for two seasons, and involved Scots writers as diverse as Ian Rankin and Alexander McCall Smith.

Following a short, Remembrance Day, for the "Five:15 Operas made in Scotland" programme, Stuart MacRae has collaborated with librettist Louise Welsh for several more works: the chamber opera Ghost Patrol for the EIF in 2012, and two full-length operas for Scottish Opera: The Devil Inside after Stevenson's The Bottle Imp in 2016, and Anthropocene on an original libretto in 2019.

Craig Armstrong's collaboration with Ian Rankin for the "Five:15" programme was Gesualdo, after the eponymous Renaissance madrigalist and murderer. This was followed in 2012 by The Lady from the Sea with a libretto by Zoë Strachan after Ibsen

More recent operas have tended to be shaped in one act, but the librettists have often been more notable than the composers. Amongst these are Louise Welsh, Zoë Strachan, Armando Iannucci and Aonghas MacNeacail. Jane Annie is an earlier example of this phenomenon.

In 2011 the opera company NOISE Opera was formed to specifically ask the question,”what makes a Scottish Opera?”. This resulted in the commissioning and creation of three works between 2011 and 2018, composed by Scottish-based composer, Gareth Williams. The first, The Sloans Project, was written in collaboration with the staff and patrons of Glasgow's oldest bar and restaurant, Sloans. The opera was performed across all three floors of the bar in four productions between 2011 and 2018, and the opera was sung in Glaswegian dialect and accent. The Sloans Project has been performed at Aberdeen's Sound Festival, Edinburgh Fringe Festival (Made in Scotland) and in Toronto by Tapestry Opera in 2012. The second NOISE commission led Williams to collaborate with Shetlandic fiddler and composer, Chris Stout, resulting in Hirda, an opera that premiered in the Mareel Theatre in Lerwick in 2015, the first opera to be written and sung in Shetlandic dialect. Hirda was also the first opera to be performed at Glasgow's Celtic Connections Festival, in 2017. The third work by NOISE Opera, was Navigate the Blood, a collaboration between Williams and the indie pop/folk band, Admiral Fallow. This opera, written in lowlands Scots, toured whisky distilleries across Scotland in 2018, telling a story of a Scottish family of distillers, and a mysterious house guest who turns up in the middle of the night.

=== Scottish Gaelic operas ===
A far smaller body of work exists in Scottish Gaelic. Nonetheless, a handful of operas have been written in the language.

- Sweeney, William (Libretto: Aonghas MacNeacail) An Turus –
- Jean-Paul Dessy and David Graham, (Libretto: Iain Finlay Macleod)

=== Lowland Scots operas ===
Ayrshire Opera Experience are an Ayrshire-based company who have worked in conjunction with the Robert Burns Birthplace museum to translate and perform operas in the Scots language. Their productions include new Scots translations of Mozart's The Magic Flute and Purcell's Dido and Aeneas by librettist Dr Michael Dempster.

== Scots in opera ==
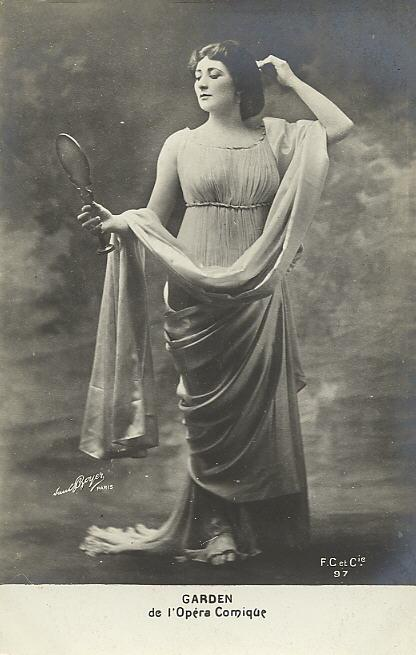
Mary Garden in the opera Thaïs

Singers

Due to the limited opportunities available to Scottish opera singers, many perform abroad, such as Mary Garden who found fame in the US, Morag Beaton and David Hamilton who found fame in Australia, but England is perhaps the most popular destination. Some have also worked in Continental Europe, such as Joseph Hislop and Marie McLaughlin.

Some Scottish popular singers, often untrained, have ventured into operatic singing, or at least singing operatic pieces: these include Darius Campbell-Danesh and Susan Boyle, who has sung Gershwin's Someone to Watch Over Me. Darius' professional career began as a ten-year-old acting in a non-singing role as a Trojan boy in the Scottish Opera's avant garde 1990s production of The Trojans. As a teenager he performed with Scottish Opera at Covent Garden Royal Opera House in a critically acclaimed production of Carmen.

Other notable Scottish singers

- Paul Agnew
- Isobel Baillie
- Isobel Buchanan
- Yvie Burnett
- Murray Dickie
- Muriel Dickson
- Sophia Dussek
- Linda Finnie
- Mary Garden
- Gavin Gordon
- Linda Esther Gray
- Henry Herford
- Elizabeth Inverarity
- Durward Lely
- Neil Mackie
- Margaret Anne Marshall
- Morag McLaren
- Marie McLaughlin
- Iain Paterson (bass-baritone)
- Meston Reid
- Shuna Scott Sendall
- Anne Sharp
- Nicky Spence
- John Templeton (opera singer)
- Robert Wilson (tenor)

Production personnel

Stage directors

- Paul Curran
- David McVicar

== Opera venues in Scotland ==
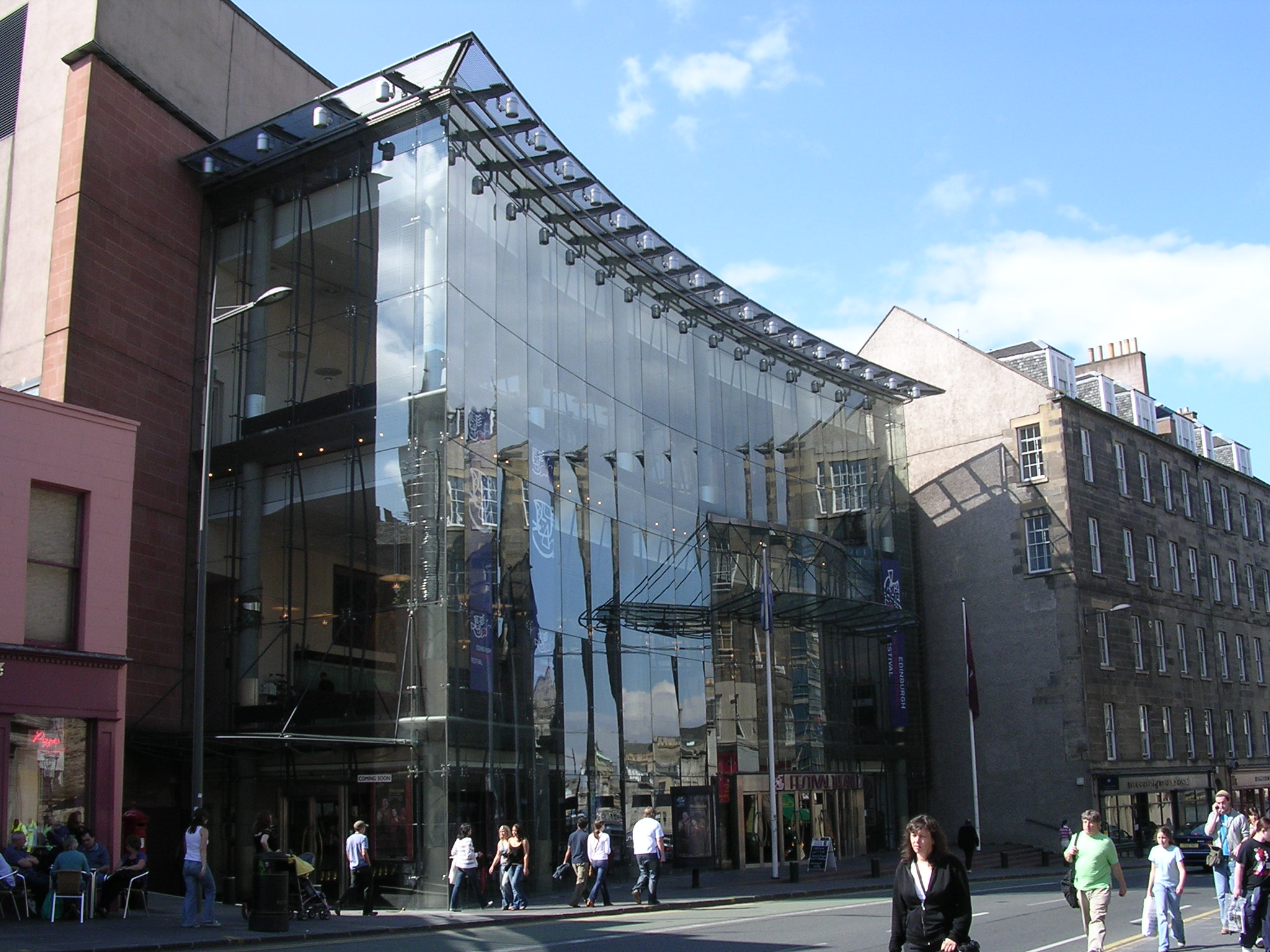
The Edinburgh Festival Theatre building on Nicolson Street in Edinburgh

Scottish Opera in the context of the Performing Arts

Scotland has only one dedicated opera house, namely the Theatre Royal, Glasgow which has been the home of Scottish Opera since 1975. Owned by Scottish Opera, the Theatre Royal has been managed since 2005 by the Ambassador Theatre Group.

Scottish Opera is the national opera company, one of the five national performing arts companies funded by the Scottish Government. Founded in 1962 and based in Glasgow, it is the largest performing arts organisation in Scotland. The other four, with their years of foundation, are the Royal Scottish National Orchestra (1891), Scottish Ballet (1969), Scottish Chamber Orchestra (1974), and the National Theatre of Scotland (2006).

Opera venues in Scotland

Scottish Opera performs mostly in the Theatre Royal, Glasgow, at the Edinburgh Festival Theatre, and in both His Majesty's Theatre in Aberdeen and at the Eden Court Theatre in Inverness.

Since 1947 and the foundation of the Edinburgh International Festival, a strong standard of provision from visiting companies has normally formed a highlight of the Scottish operatic year. The lack of an Edinburgh venue suitable for international theatre companies was however a problem over much of this time. The obvious solution was to finance a purpose-built modern theatre of the sort found in many overseas capitals. After much criticism of the inadequacy of venues, a plan from 1960 to construct a long overdue opera house-concert hall complex developed into a long-running saga that became known as Edinburgh's "hole in the ground". The project was eventually abandoned due to increasing cost projections and a lack of political will to start implementing it. The site in Castle Terrace was eventually leased for office development in 1988.

Subsequently, Festival opera has found its home in large traditional Edinburgh venues, renovated in turn to bring them up to modern standards. For some years in the 1980s it was the Edinburgh Playhouse with its impressive official capacity of 2900. Since 1994 the Edinburgh Festival Theatre (formerly The Empire Theatre) has been used both for the Festival and by Scottish Opera on their visits to Edinburgh.

Elsewhere in Scotland, operas are also staged in a wide range of multipurpose theatres/performance spaces which regularly host performances of opera or opera excerpts, such as the Pitlochry Festival Theatre. There is also a certain amount of small scale touring opera at various community venues throughout the nation.
