= Ralph Sherwin (actor) =

English actor (1799–1830)

Ralph Sherwin (April 1799 – 1830) was an English actor. During a short career he appeared for three years at Drury Lane.

== Life ==
Sherwin was born in April 1799 at Bishop Auckland in County Durham. He was educated at Witton-le-Wear, and studied medicine for five years in London and Edinburgh. He was inspired to take to the stage on becoming acquainted with Frederick Henry Yates of Covent Garden, and his first appearance was made in York in July 1818, under Mansell. He remained in the York company for two years, acting in Leeds, Hull, and Sheffield. He then went to the Theatre Royal, Birmingham, under Alfred Bunn, losing his wardrobe when the theatre was burned down. At Brighton, under John Brunton Jr, he played low comedy and old men, subsequently rejoining Bunn at Leicester, and reappearing in the newly erected theatre in Birmingham.

In February 1823, as "Sherwin from York", he appeared at Drury Lane, playing Dandie Dinmont in Guy Mannering to the Dominie Sampson of John Liston. Engaged for three years, he acted Robin in No Song, No Supper, Paddock in My Spouse and I, Diggory Delph in Family Jars, and other parts. He was, in February 1825, the original Shock, a very poor shepherd, in Joseph Lunn's adaptation The Shepherd of Derwent Vale, or the Innocent Culprit; in May he was Sam Sharpset in The Slave to William Macready's Gambia, and in June he played Russet in The Jealous Wife.

Few opportunities were, however, given him, and at the end of the three years he seems not to have been re-engaged. Irregular habits were the reputed cause of his dismissal. He then took to driving a stage-coach, which he upset, returning for a short time to the stage. He died in 1830, in Durham, at his father's house.

== His character ==
Joseph Knight wrote: "Sherwin had a fine face and figure, expressive features, and a voice smooth and powerful. He was a good mimic, could sketch likenesses with remarkable fidelity, and was an efficient representative of Yorkshire characters. His talent was, however, impaired by indulgence."
