= Henriette the Forsaken =

1832 play

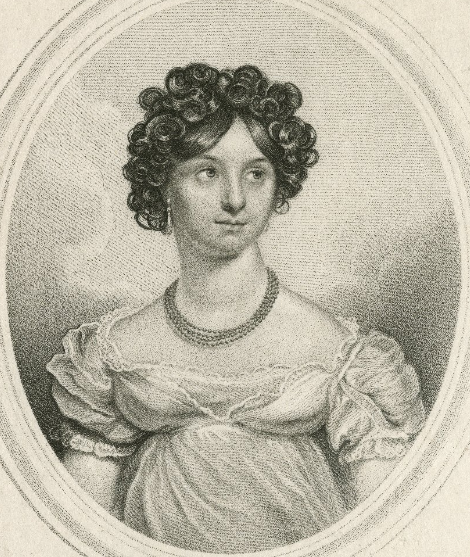
- Elizabeth Yates played the title role
- Original language: English
- Written by: John Baldwin Buckstone
- Genre: Melodrama

Premiere
- Date: 5 November 1832
- Place: Adelphi Theatre, London

Henriette the Forsaken is an 1832 play by the British writer John Baldwin Buckstone. It premiered at the Adelphi Theatre in London's West End. Melodrama was in fashion at the time, and the play was a popular hit.

The original cast included Frederick Henry Yates as Ferdinand De Monval, John Reeve as Chevalier Pirouette, John Baldwin Buckstone as Pierre Gigot, Elizabeth Yates as Henriette and Fanny Fitzwilliam as Rose.

== Bibliography ==
- Gressman, Malcolm George. The Career of John Baldwin Buckstone. Ohio State University, 1963.
- Nicoll, Allardyce. A History of Early Nineteenth Century Drama 1800-1850. Cambridge University Press, 1930.
