= Fanny Robertson =

19th-century actor

- Born: Frances Mary Ross
- Died: 18 December 1855; Wisbech, Isle of Ely, Cambridgeshire, England
- Occupations: Actress, playwright, manager
- Spouse: Thomas Shaftoe Robertson (m. 1793; died 1831)
- Relatives: Anna Ross (sister); Elizabeth Yates (niece); Louisa Brunton (sister-in-law); William Shaftoe Robertson (nephew)

Fanny Robertson (1765 – 18 December 1855), born Frances Mary Ross, was an actress and later the manager of the provincial theatres of the Lincoln Circuit.

== Family ==
Robertson's parents were the actors William Ross (died 1781) and his wife Elizabeth (née Mills), later Mrs John Brown (died 1823). Her younger sister Anna Ross married the actor-manager John Brunton. Anna and John's eldest daughter was the actress Elizabeth Yates, and John's sister Louisa Brunton, another actress, married Major-General William Craven, 1st Earl of Craven. Her half-brothers John Mills Brown, Henry Brown and half-sister Mary Clarke (née Brown) were also actors who had appeared with her on the Lincoln Circuit.

She married Thomas Shaftoe Robertson, actor and manager, on 8 September 1793. They had at least three children, Richard Shaftoe (b. 1794), Thomas Shaftoe (b. 1795) and John (b. 1796). A nephew was William Shaftoe Robertson, whose most famous children were the playwright T. W. Robertson and the actress Dame Madge Kendal.

== Acting career ==
Robertson performed at the Theatre Royal, Norwich, in the 1770s, 1780s and 1790s, often with her sister and other family members. At a benefit performance on 2 May 1791 in Norwich, she appeared as Euphrasia in The Grecian Daughter.

Miss F. Ross made her debut in Tragedy (on our theatric boards) for her sister's Benefit in the arduous character of Euphrasia ... and if the great applause she received may be taken as a criterion of her merit, her performance of the part may justify us in saying, that with practice and attention she bids fair to attain an elevated situation among the daughters of Melpomene.

Her future husband Thomas Shaftoe Robertson and "Jemmy" Miller ran the Lincoln Circuit of theatres until 2 May 1796, when Miller sold out to Tom, who entered into partnership with Robert Henry Franklin. The theatre venues in the Circuit varied over time, but at some point included theatres in Lincoln, Boston, Grantham, Peterborough, Newark, Oundle, Spalding, Huntingdon, Wisbech, and other nearby towns. Audience behaviour could be unruly, and on occasion her husband had to take steps to protect Fanny and other actors, as recounted in this newspaper report:

We are glad to find that the person who threw a glass at Mrs. Robertson from the gallery of the theatre, December last, is made sensible of his offense (see the advertisement in this page). Praise is due to Mr. Robertson for the steps which we understand he immediately took to punish this man for his conduct, and we hope they will be an example to the public, to show Mr. Robertson's determination to prevent repetition of offenses, and to preserve uninterrupted the peace of his theatre.

Robertson's long career as actor and manager enabled her to work with several generations of actors, including child actor William Henry West Betty, who performed in the Georgian theatre in Wisbech in 1808. Over 30 years later Fanny Robertson brought his son, Henry Betty, to perform at her Spalding theatre in October 1839. In April 1810 she appeared with John Quick at Wisbech as Julia in The Way to Married, as Roasalind in As You Like It, and as Letitia Hardy in The Belle's Stratagem, finally as the widow Belmour in The Way to Keep Him. In November 1813 she performed as Donna Violante opposite Charles Kemble as Don Felix in The Wonder! A Woman Keeps a Secret! at the Theatre, Newark.

She performed opposite Edmund Kean as Portia and Shylock in The Merchant of Venice in Lincoln in 1824, where he also played the title characters in Richard III, Othello and Hamlet. He returned to appear in The Merchant of Venice in Boston and Wisbech in April 1831. She performed as Ophelia opposite William Macready in Hamlet in September 1828 in Lincoln and again in June 1836 in Wisbech and Peterborough to open a five-week season. Another West End actor brought by Robertson to perform at Wisbech and other Lincoln Circuit venues was Henry Compton. A critic wrote that his performance as Touchstone in As You Like It and as Mawwarm in Isaac Bickerstaff's The Hypocrite "was capital, he kept the audience in one tumult of laughter from beginning to end".

When her husband was put in Lincoln Castle Gaol for debt in 1817, supporters aided them by putting on amateur productions and purchasing the theatrical travelling property sold by auction, and appointing him their manager. Some landlords even reduced the rents of their theatres, according to a handbill promoting Speed the Plough and Chip of the Old Block, to be performed on 7 April 1817 at the theatre in Wisbech.

== Theatre management and later years ==
Fanny inherited the Lincoln Circuit, when widowed in 1831, and announced that her nephew William Roberson would conduct the acting management and that his wife Margaretta would make her first appearance as a singer in Lincoln on 28 September. This also coincided with the installation of gas lighting in the theatre. Fanny shortened her company's seasons at the Lincoln Circuit theatres and added short stops for fairs and race weeks; she also wrote and produced the plays The Nun (1833) at Lincoln in November 1833, and Louis XIII (1836) in December 1836. The corn merchant James Hill (father of Octavia Hill and Miranda Hill) bought the Georgian theatre in Wisbech and adjoining land in 1835 and started to invest money in the theatre and in further developing the site. On 27 June 1840 James Hill and Thomas Hill went bankrupt and their estates were sold by auction, including the Wisbech theatre, which Fanny Robertson was then leasing.

The changing tastes of patrons may be evident from an advert in the Stamford Mercury: "Mrs T. Robertson had just entered upon the occupancy of Stamford Theatre and announced her intention to commence a season starting on 5th October 1841 (the next race day). She also announced a series of grand MUSICAL and INSTRUMENTAL CONCERTS by artists from the Gloucester Festival, to be held in Boston on 19th September and Lincoln on 21st and for race week. Theatrical performances in Peterborough for the Fair nights and to return for 2nd, 4th and 9th due to their commitment to Stamford Race week (5th to 8th October) and a five week season." After the Guy Fawkes Night performance of King John and Mary, the Maid of the Inn at Stamford, the vocalists Elizabeth Inverarity, her husband Charles Martyn, his sister, Mr Frazer and Mr Stretton toured Peterborough, Wisbech, Boston and Lincoln with musical concerts in November 1841. At the Wisbech theatre the attendance was very bad, as was the weather.

The Wisbech theatre had been "lately fitted up and decorated at great expense, for the purpose of public assemblies and concerts" when it was offered for sale by auction at the White Hart Inn on 2 May 1843. Robertson continued as a tenant In April 1843, The Theatre wrote: "On Monday evening our theatrical friends took leave of us. Mrs. Robertson had her farewell benefit, having resigned the management to her nephew, Mr. W. Robertson. She appeared in the character of Lady Eleanor Irwin, in Elizabeth Inchbald's comedy Everyone Has His Fault after which she delivered a very neat and appropriate address. There was a full house, but we are sorry to say the season has been productive of very few even tolerable houses."

Robertson retired to Wisbech that year, and her nephew William Robertson became the manager of the family's theatres and theatre company. On 6 November 1843 the Wisbech theatre was again put up for auction "in an excellent condition". Fanny Robertson made an agreement to sell Huntingdon theatre to James Balfour in 1845. In July 1846 the Robertson theatre company performed a play Mind how you Wed! written by Dr Whitsed, a local GP and later mayor.

In May 1847 Mr Davenport, manager of several Norfolk theatres, took a season at the Wisbech theatre and held a benefit night for Robertson. By 1848 the Robertson theatre company was reported to have been entirely broken up. Robertson, aged 80, was in a state of such poverty that Huntingdon and other towns on the Circuit opened subscription lists to remedy the situation. A concert at the Wisbech theatre by the Wisbech Harmonic Society and Mr. T. Macklin of King's College Chapel to raise funds for an annuity for Robertson was arranged in May 1848. This was apparently successful, as the 1851 census records that she was then "an annuitant living on her own in Norfolk Street West, Wisbech."

Robertson died in 1855 in Wisbech, attended by her friend, the amateur playwright and medical doctor John Whitsted.

== Legacy ==
William Hilton, a son of the portrait painter William Hilton Snr of Lincoln, one of the company's scenery painters, was encouraged by Robertson to pursue a career as an artist; he rose to become a Royal Academician and, in gratitude for her assistance, later painted Fanny Robertson in the role of Beatrice. In 1866 the painting was in the Wisbech Working Men's Institute. William Hilton Snr was credited on theatre handbills for creating scenery for the Robertsons until the 1820s.

The Wisbech & Fenland Museum has a collection of over two hundred theatre posters, handbills and other items from the Georgian theatre in Wisbech. A small collection is also held by the Angles Theatre. The Wisbech theatre reopened in the 1970s as the Angles Theatre. Its bar was named Macready's but was later changed to "The Lincoln Circuit", to commemorate the theatre circuit run by Robertson and her family.

== Sources ==
- Highfill, Philip H.; Burnim, Kalman A.; Langhans, Edward A. (1973). A Biographical Dictionary of Actors, Actresses, Musicians, Dancers, Managers and Other Stage Personnel in London, 1660–1800. SIU Press. ISBN 9780809305186.
- Pemberton, T. Edgar (1900). The Kendals: A Biography. London: Pearson. OCLC 684413482.
- Neil R Wright (2016). Treading the Boards. Society for Lincolnshire History & Archaeology.
