= Ralph Sherwin =

Ralph Sherwin may refer to:

- Ralph Sherwin (priest) (1550–1581), a Catholic martyr and saint
- Ralph Sherwin (actor) (1799–1830), English actor
- Ralph W. Sherwin (1888–1963), American football player and coach
