= Anna Ross =

Actress, dramatist

Anna Ross Brunton (c. 1773 – ?) was an English actress and dramatist and part of an extended family of actors. She began writing for the stage at the age of fifteen and was acting by that time, sometimes in London, but mostly in the English provinces. She continued to perform until at least 1820.

== Early life ==
Anna Ross was born to the actor William Ross (died 1781) and his wife Elizabeth Mills, later Mrs John Brown (died 1823). She had an elder sister, Frances Mary Ross (later Fanny Robertson), and a younger half-brother, American John Mills Brown, both actors. She married the actor-manager John Brunton on 6 September 1792, and they had at least four children. Two of their daughters were actors; the eldest was Elizabeth Yates. One son joined the British Navy. John's sister Louisa Brunton, an actress, married Major-General William Craven, 1st Earl of Craven.

Ross wrote the comic opera The Cottagers when she was fifteen. It was published in 1788 and was performed at the Theatre Bury, as a benefit performance for Ross, on 24 October 1788 with a cast that included Ross, her mother and stepfather, and at the Crow Street Theatre in Dublin on 19 May 1789, starring her mother. The piece was never again performed on stage in Britain, but it has been anthologized and praised in studies of 18th-century dramatic writing.

Ross began acting in the 1780s with her mother and stepfather, John Brown (died 1818). She acted in London at Covent Garden Theatre as Sylvia in Cymon in 1788 alongside her stepfather, who on that date also performed an "Occasional Epiloque" written by Ross, but she performed mostly in the British provinces. In 1792, in Edinburgh, she played Amaranth in John O'Keeffe's Wild Oats.

== Later years ==
After her 1792 marriage, Ross performed as Mrs Brunton, including a season with the company managed by her brother-in-law, Thomas Shaftoe Robertson, in Lincoln in 1802, in The Padlock as Leonora and The Cabinet as Floretta, among other plays. The same year, she played Margaretta in No Song, No Supper at the Robertson and Franklin company's Peterborough theatre. She performed extensively in Norwich during her career.

She appeared at the Georgian Wisbech Theatre, as Rosabelle in The Foundling of the Forest from 27 April 1810 until her benefit night on 25 May (her credit states: "Her first appearance these 3 years"), followed by David Garrick's The Jubilee on each date, as 1st country girl. At Wisbech, in May 1820, she appeared as Miss Nancy in Killing No Murder, as Rosabelle in Foundling of the Forest, played together with Bluebeard, in which she played Fatima, as Agnes in The Mountaineers, in Pizarro; or, The Conquror of Peru, together with the Browns, and as Maria in Of Age Tomorrow on the same bill as Pizarro. The Wisbech Theatre was managed by her brother-in-law, Thomas Shaftoe Robertson, and later by her sister Fanny.
