= William Shaftoe Robertson =

19th-century actor

- Born: c. 1799
- Died: c1872
- Occupations: actor and manager
- Known for: The Robertson theatre company
- Spouse: Margharetta Elisabetta Marinus (m. 1828)
- Children: 22, including Thomas William Robertson and Madge Kendal

William Shaftoe Robertson (c. 1799–1872) was a British actor and theatre manager. He was the nephew of Fanny Robertson, manager of the Lincoln theatre circuit, and her husband Thomas Shaftoe Robertson. As a young man, he began acting with his family in the Lincoln circuit. After his aunt retired in 1843, he became manager of the eight theatres in the circuit. In the 1850s, he moved his large family to London and became joint manager of the Marylebone Theatre and appeared there on stage. He continued to act in provincial theatres until retiring in 1867. His famous children include T. W. Robertson and Madge Kendal.

== Early life and career ==
Robertson was born in Stamford, Lincolnshire. He became a lawyer, as a young man, then performed with his family in the eight Lincolnshire and nearby theatres that they managed. His first appearance at the Georgian theatre in Wisbech (later the Angles Theatre), was as Rover in the comedy Wild Oats opposite his aunt, Fanny Robertson (stagename Mrs T. Robertson) as Lady Amaranthe on 4 June 1824.

In 1828 he married the Danish-born actress Margharetta Elisabetta née Marinus (died 1876). Her father taught languages in London, and she spoke English with no trace of a foreign accent. At the age of 17, she had joined the Robertsons' company, where she met Robertson. They had a reported 22 children, many of whom appeared in juvenile roles on the stage. Of these, T. W. Robertson (later a playwright), Fanny Robertson (1830–1903), Elizabeth Robertson Diver, stage name E. Brunton (1833–1893), Edward Shaftoe Robertson (1844–1871), James Robertson, Georgiana Robertson (1840–1913), Frederick Craven Shaftoe Robertson (1846–1879) and Madge Kendal carried on the profession into adulthood.

When his aunt Fanny retired in 1843, Robertson succeeded her as manager of the Robertson company of actors and their Lincolnshire Circuit theatres. In early 1850, the family performed in Colne and then moved on to Burnley, Lancashire for a week in a temporary theatre, the Temperance Hall, in which they presented The Stranger (an English translation of the 1798 play Menschenhass und Reue (Misanthropy and Repentance) by August von Kotzebue), King Lear, She Stoops to Conquer and William Tell. In 1851, the family was back in Burnley.

== Later years ==
By the early 1850s, Lincolnshire theatres had gradually become financially unviable, (Note: In a 1900 biography of the Kendals, T. Edgar Pemberton attributes the decline of such provincial theatre circuits to the effect of the railways, which "destroyed the comparative isolation of the small from the larger towns … local interests became absorbed in the now accessible wonders to be seen in the great world outside".) and Robertson moved his family to London, where he became joint manager of the Marylebone Theatre. Robertson appeared in Ion and The Seven Poor Travellers in 1855. That year, the family moved to Bristol. Over the next decade, the Robertsons and their children played steadily in provincial theatres.

Robertson's last appearances were with his wife and his daughter Fanny in 1867 in Planché's Plot and Passion, Sheridan's The School for Scandal and John Baldwin Buckstone's farce A Rough Diamond, in Boston, Lincolnshire. In 1871, Robertson was living with his wife, daughter Fanny and a granddaughter in St Pancras, Middlesex.

He died on 4 December 1872 at his residence in Russell Square, London, at the age of 73.

== Sources ==
- Kendal, Madge (1933). Rudolph De Cordova (ed.). Dame Madge Kendal by Herself. London: John Murray. OCLC 2325826.
- Pemberton, T. Edgar (1900). The Kendals: A Biography. London: Pearson. OCLC 684413482.
- Wright, Neil R. (2016). Treading the Boards: Actors and Theatres in Georgian Lincolnshire. Lincoln: Society for Lincolnshire History & Archaeology. ISBN 978-0-90-358255-1.
