= Elizabeth Yates (actress) =

English actress

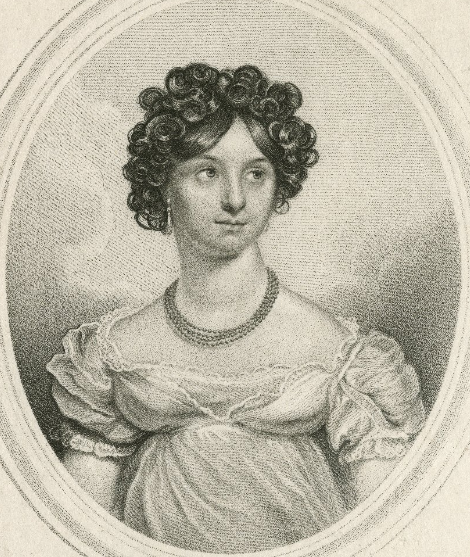
- Born: Elizabeth Brunton; 21 January 1799; Norwich
- Died: 30 August 1860 (aged 61)
- Other names: Miss Brunton, Mrs. Yates, and Mrs. Yates late Miss Brunton
- Occupation: Actress
- Spouse: Frederick Henry Yates

Elizabeth Yates (née Brunton; 21 January 1799 – 30 August 1860) was an English actress. She appeared on the stage under the names Miss Brunton, Elizabeth Brunton, Elizabeth Yates, Mrs. Yates, and Mrs. Yates late Miss Brunton.

== Early life and family ==
Elizabeth Brunton was born at Norwich on 21 January 1799 to a theatrical family. Her grandfather, John Brunton, acted at Covent Garden Theatre in 1774 and was later a theatre manager; her father, also John Brunton (1775–1849), went on the stage in 1795, and later appeared at Covent Garden in 1800 as Frederick in Louisa's Vows. He also managed theatres, including those in Brighton, Birmingham, Exeter and King's Lynn. Her mother was the actress Anna Ross, sister to Fanny Robertson, and Yates had at least three siblings. Elizabeth's aunt, Anne Brunton, was an actress who also appeared at Covent Garden. Another aunt, Louisa Brunton, also an actress, later married Major-General William Craven, 1st Earl of Craven.

Brunton married Frederick Henry Yates, a fellow actor with whom she had worked at Drury Lane, on 30 November 1823. A son Edmond Hodgson Yates (1831-1894) was born on 3 July 1831 in Edinburgh, Scotland.

== Early stage career ==
Elizabeth Brunton made her theatrical debut in 1815, in her father's theatre at Lynn, playing Desdemona opposite Charles Kemble as Othello. Her father thought her talents more suited to comedy, and she therefore next played Letitia Hardy in the Belle's Stratagem, opposite Robert William Elliston as Doricourt. Elliston hired Brunton for his theatre at Birmingham; she also played in Worcester, Shrewsbury, and Leicester.

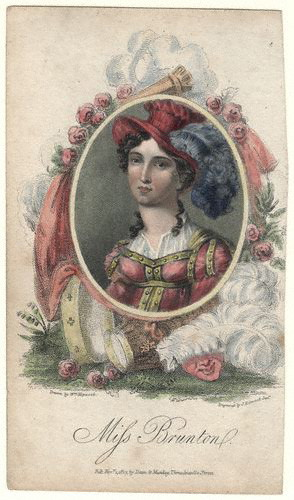
Miss Brunton, 1817 engraving by James Hopwood Jr., after William Hopwood.

Brunton made her London debut at Covent Garden in 1817 in the role of Letitia Hardy; she also played Rosalind in As You Like It. The Theatrical Inquisitor gave some praise to her Letitia, but pronounced her Rosalind a failure. Her first season included roles as Miss Hardcastle in She Stoops to Conquer, Beatrice in Much Ado about Nothing, Viola in Twelfth Night, Imogen, Cora in Pizarro, Lady Elizabeth Freelove in the Day after the Wedding, and Myrtillo in the Broken Sword. She played the original Rosalia in Frederick Reynolds's Duke of Savoy.

In the 1818–1819 season, Brunton reprised her role as Letitia Hardy, in Edinburgh and, at Covent Garden, played Lady Teazle, Fanny in The Clandestine Marriage, Widow Bellmour in The Way to Keep Him, Lydia Languish, Rosara in She Would and She Would Not, Miss Tittup in Bon Ton, and Miss Wooburn in Every one has his Fault. She had an original part in A Word for the Ladies, and was the first Jeanie Deans in Daniel Terry's adaptation of Walter Scott's The Heart of Midlothian.

In her final season at Covent Garden (engagements at the patent theatres generally lasted three years), Brunton played Miss Prue in Love for Love, Sophia in The Road to Ruin, Dorinda in Dryden's Tempest, Elvira in Love Makes a Man, and was the first Clotilde de Biron in Thomas Morton's Henri Quatre.

== Later years ==
Following her departure from London, Brunton joined her father at the West London Theatre in Tottenham Street, where she played in Rochester, Three Weeks After Marriage, She Stoops to Conquer, and other pieces.

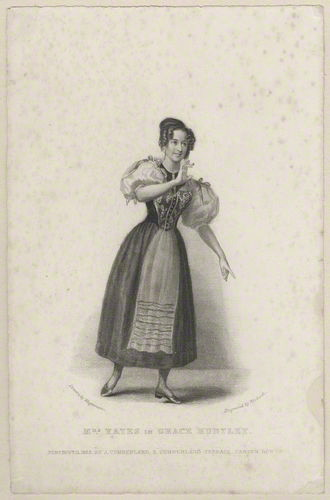
Elizabeth Yates in the melodrama Grace Huntley by Henry Holl; 1833 engraving by Thomas Woolnoth, after Thomas Charles Wageman.

In the 1823–24 season, Brunton appeared in Bath as Albina Mandeville in The Will; as Belinda in All in the Wrong, Clarinda in the Suspicious Husband, The Peasant Boy, Helen Worrett in Man and Wife, Aladdin, Widow Cheerly in The Soldier's Daughter, Miss Dorillon in Wives as they were, Cynthia in Oberon and Cynthia, Biddy Tipkin in The Tender Husband, Dolly Bull in Fontainebleau, Clara in Matrimony, Olivia in Bold Stroke for a Husband, Lydia Languish and Actress of All Work and Harriet in Is he jealous?.

Brunton played with her now-husband at Cheltenham, and made her first appearance at Drury Lane as Violante in 1824. In the 1825–26 season, Yates played the first Guido in Massaniello, the first Agnes in Knowles's William Tell, Mrs. Frail in Love for Love, Clarissa in The Confederacy, Aurora in The Panel, Isabinda in The Busy Body, Constantia (an original part) in Joseph Lunn's White Lies, Countess Wintersen in The Stranger, among other parts; her husband did not share this engagement.

After 1828, Yates played primarily at Drury Lane. Throughout the 1830s, she played leading roles in plays by Buckstone, including in Wreck Ashore, Victorine, Henriette the Forsaken and Isabelle. Additionally, she played Orynthe in Fitzball's Earthquake, Mona in Charles Mathews's Truth, Elizabeth Stanton in Fitzball's Tom Cringle, Valsha in Stirling Coyne's's Valsha, Grace Darling in Edward Stirling's Grace Darling, and Miss Aubrey in Richard Brinsley Peake's Ten Thousand a Year.

Yates played in Surrey in 1839, as Margaret Mammon in Thomas Herbert Reynoldson's Curse of Mammon.

== Decline and death ==
After the death of her husband, in June 1842, Yates tried a year's management at the Adelphi Theatre with Mary Gladstane, but found the task too much for her. She played one season at the Lyceum in 1848–9, where she played Tilburina in The Critic, among other parts.

Yates then withdrew from the stage, and, after a long and painful illness, died on 30 August 1860. (Note: At Kentish Town, according to her son's book; on 5 September, at Brighton, according to the Era newspaper and the Era Almanack.) A miniature by Samuel John Stump of Cork Street was in the possession of her son. A portrait of her as Eugenia in Sweethearts and Wives accompanied a memoir in the Theatrical Times (i. 209), 28 November 1846.
