= John Reeve (actor) =

John Reeve (1799–1838) was an English comic actor. His early career was based on mimicry: he became a popular favourite, able to continue in highly paid work, despite drinking heavily and not learning his parts.

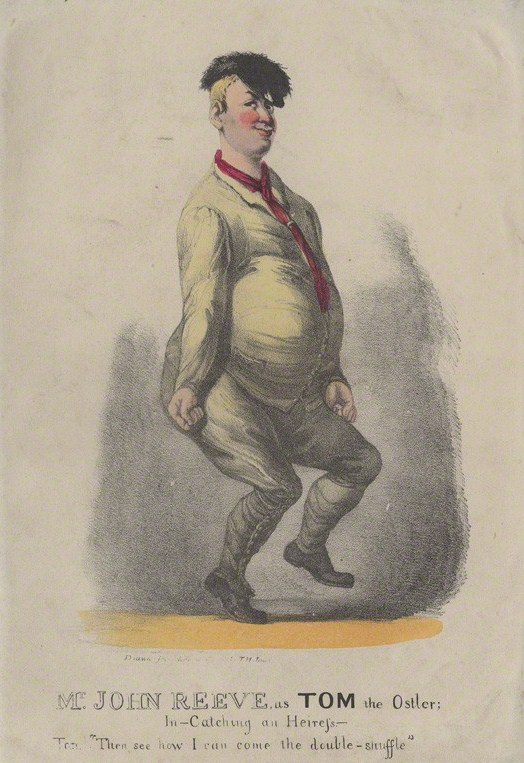
John Reeve as Tom the Ostler, c.1836

== Early life ==
The son of Thomas Reeve, a hosier and common councillor, and nephew of William Reeve and Robert Waithman, he was born at his father's shop on Ludgate Hill, on 2 February 1799. At school at Winchmore Hill under a Mr. Thompson, he had for companion Frederick Henry Yates. From age 14 behind his father's counter for two years, when his father retired, he was placed with a firm of wholesale hosiers named Nevill or Neville in Maiden Lane, Wood Street, lasting three years there.

As a clerk in Gosling's Bank on Fleet Street, Reeve with colleagues hired every two weeks Pym's Theatre, Wilson Street, off Gray's Inn Road. Pym was an ex-actor, who had fitted up an assembly room as an upmarket "private theatre", a place for well-supported amateur theatricals. Finding himself in obscure parts, Reeve hired the house on his own account for £10, and played Othello, with his friend George Herbert Bonaparte Rodwell as Roderigo, and Sylvester Daggerwood, an actor, in a farce based on New Hay at the Old Market George Colman the younger. He repeated "Sylvester Daggerwood" on 8 and 9 June 1819 at Drury Lane, in benefits for Thomas Rodwell and Gesualdo Lanza; and then played it for a few nights at the Haymarket Theatre.

== On the London stage ==
Reeve was offered an engagement by Samuel James Arnold at the Lyceum Theatre. He appeared there on 17 July 1819, under the name of Mr. *****, as Harry Alias in One, Two, Three, Four, Five by Advertisement, by John Hamilton Reynolds; the cast included William Farren, John Pritt Harley, Charles Mathews, and Joseph Munden. He resigned his post at the bank, and he played two other characters, Pedrillo and Crack, at the Lyceum, but the press only gave him credit as a mimic. The Rodwells with Willis Jones took the Sans-Pareil Theatre in the Strand, and opened it on 18 October 1819 as the Adelphi Theatre. Reeve appeared there as Squire Rattlepate in William Thomas Moncrieff's burletta, The Green Dragon, or I've quite forgot, and Lord Grizzle in a burlesque of Tom Thumb.

Feeling inexperienced, Reeve then joined William Macready the elder's company in Bristol, and for once took on comic Shakespearean characters. Back at the Adelphi, he succeeded Watkins Burroughs as Jerry Hawthorn in Moncrieff's adaptation from Pierce Egan's Tom and Jerry, or Life in London, a character he made his own. At the close of the season, he gave in 1823 at the Adelphi, with James Pimbury Wilkinson, an entertainment called Trifles light as Air, and declaimed a "monopolylogue", Bachelor's Torments; Wilkinson left, but he continued the entertainment alone.

Reeve went on to play at the Surrey Theatre and the Cobourg Theatre, rising high in public estimation. On 17 April 1826, with a salary of £13 a week, he made as Ralph, a comic servant, in Prince Hoare's Lock and Key, what was inaccurately announced as his first appearance at the Haymarket. He had established his position in comedy, and opened the Haymarket season on 15 June 1827 with Paul Pry. On 17 June 1828 he reappeared as Figaro. In 1830 he played his last season at the Haymarket: quarrelling with the management on a question of terms, he played at the Adelphi, on 21 October 1830, Magog in John Baldwin Buckstone's Wreck Ashore, and then went to Covent Garden, where he was considered to have failed.

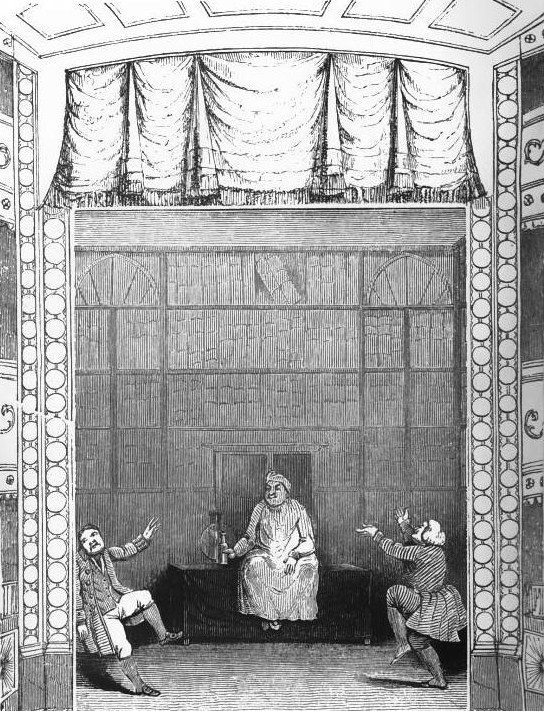
John Reeve (centre) as Bill Mattock, in The Queer Subject by Joseph Stirling Coyne, a part he played at the Adelphi Theatre in November 1836

It was with the Adelphi that Reeve's main triumphs in original parts were associated. After playing two years at the Queen's Theatre, he went, in 1835, to America, where he was well paid but did not win over the audience.

== Last years ==
Returning, at a salary of £40 a week to the Adelphi Theatre, now under the management of Frederick Henry Yates, Reeve appeared in a piece entitled Novelty, a framework for his American adventures. From early in his career, he had been a heavy drinker, often forgetting his lines. During 1836 he was to have played at the Surrey the main part in The Skeleton Witness, but at the final rehearsal he knew none of his words, and that night he sent a note of apology. Davidge, the manager, explained to the audience that the actor was being paid £30 a week. In 1837 Reeve played Sam Weller in the Peregrinations of Pickwick and was seen in other characters.

Reeve's last appearance in 1837 was at the Surrey Theatre, with some of the Adelphi company. He performed poorly in a part he had chosen in a new drama, The Wandering Tribe, and returning from the theatre after the second show, he broke a blood-vessel. He died at his house, 46 Brompton Row, on 24 January 1838, and was buried in Brompton churchyard. His comedian replacement at the Adelphi was Henry Roxby Beverley.

== Reputation ==
Douglas Bannister, biographer of Reeve, said he was just a farceur and droll, a follower of the style of William Oxberry. He was on winking terms with his audience, in a way not seen since George Frederick Cooke: the managers John Baldwin Buckstone and Richard Brinsley Peake fed him with short sentences, bywords, and opportunities for business, instead of speeches, which he would not learn. He remained a favourite with the public, and managers still hired him, knowing full well his drink problem and unreliability.

== Family ==
Reeve was twice married. By his first wife, a Miss Aylett, daughter of an upholsterer in Finsbury, and a dancer in Macready's company, whom he married at Bristol in 1820, he left a son John, a burlesque actor; she died at his birth in 1822 at Swansea. By his second wife he had two daughters.

== Notes ==
Attribution

This article incorporates text from a publication now in the public domain: Lee, Sidney, ed. (1896). "Reeve, John (1799-1838)". Dictionary of National Biography. Vol. 47. London: Smith, Elder & Co.
