= John Brunton (actor) =

19th-century actor

- Born: 1741; Norwich
- Died: 1822 (aged 80–81)
- Occupations: actor, manager and philanthropist
- Known for: manager of the Norwich theatre company (1788–1800)
- Spouse: Elizabeth/Ann Friend (1744-1826)
- Children: 14 including actors Louisa, Countess of Craven and Ann Brunton Merry

John Brunton (1741–1822) was an English actor who became the manager of a circuit of theatres in and around Norfolk. He assiduously cultivated emerging talent in his company, which also produced actors amongst his children and grandchildren. He also used funds from his theatrical successes to fund philanthropy, including establishing the Norwich Theatrical Fund.

== Early life ==
Brunton was born in Norwich, the son of a soap maker, and educated at the grammar school under Rev Wilton. He served an apprenticeship to a grocer before moving to work with a relative in Canterbury, where he met and married a daughter of Mr. Friend, a tailor and draper. Later he went to London as a grocer and tea-dealer.

== Early career ==
A friendship with J. Younger of Covent Garden theatre prompted him to appear on the stage in Cyrus on 11 April 1774 and on 3 May as the title character in Hamlet. He then took up acting in Norwich where, on 2 September 1775 he was again Hamlet with the Norwich company at Colchester theatre. On 6 May 1776 he was Shylock in The Merchant of Venice in Norwich. On 1 December he was Hamlet at Yarmouth theatre.

By 1779 he was living on the Lowe Close, Norwich. At Bristol and Bath, in The Tragedy of Jane Shore by Nicholas Rowe in 1780, he appeared with Sarah Siddons and was said "to have a very fine and very powerful voice, he speaks the sense of his author distinctly; his manner is sufficiently marking; and, upon the whole, he promises to be an acquisition to our theatre". Another Covent Garden Theatre appearance was as Evander in The Grecian Daughter on 28 October 1785 with his daughter Ann in the title role.

== Management and later years ==
He became the lessee of the Norwich Theatre Circuit by 1788. In May of that year he purchased the remaining five-year lease of the Norwich theatre. On 5 May 1790 another daughter Miss E Brunton made her debut on Covent Garden Theatre stage in The Man of Quality; she is described as very young and beautiful.

In January 1791 Brunton established the Norwich Theatrical Fund for "the relief of such as through age or infirmity might be compelled to retire from the stage". This was the first theatrical fund outside of London. Later that month he donated the proceeds of his benefit to the local Sunday schools. Brunton's takings at a performance in King's Lynn this month were said to be the greatest any manager had achieved at the venue; other plays included Better Late than Never and Rosina. In March at Norwich was played The Road to Ruin, The Old Maid by Arthur Murphy, Next Door Neighbours, The Irish Widow, The Romp, Which is the Man? and Who's the Dupe? by Hannah Cowley. In April he put on at Norwich The Woodman by Rev Henry Bate Dudley, The Deserter of Naples, King Richard the III and Modern Antiques. The Easter Monday benefit performance of King Richard the III featured his daughter-in-law Anna Ross and her benefit on 2 May featured her sister Fanny Robertson as Euphrasia in The Grecian Daughter.

In January 1792 he played Eustace de St Pierre in Colman junior's The Surrender of Calais. He gave the receipts of his benefit to local Sunday schools. On 29 March 1792 in The Battle of Hexham the part of Queen Margaret was played by local playwright Hannah Brand at Norwich. The lease on the Norwich theatre expired on 1 June 1800. That night, he took his final leave of Norwich theatre before a crowded house, reprising his Shylock.

Aged 82, Brunton died on 19 December 1822; his widow Elizabeth died in 1826.

== Family ==
Brunton married Elizabeth on 7 August 1766. Their fourteen children included Ann Brunton Merry, actress and theatre manager (married William Warren); Elizabeth Columbine (1772–1799) also an actress; and John Brunton Jr (1775–1848), actor and theatre manager at Brighton, Norwich, Birmingham and King's Lynn. Brunton Jr married Anna Ross, and two of their five children were the actresses Elizabeth Yates and Fanny Maria Brunton (1803–1883) Among Brunton's other children who appeared on stage were Louisa, Countess of Craven, who married the 1st Earl Craven, Thomas (b. 1789) and Kitty (b. 1789). His son Lieut-Col Richard Brunton (1787–1846) was a distinguished veteran of Waterloo and the Crimean War.
