= Louisa Craven, Countess of Craven =

English actress (1782–1860)

Louisa Brunton, 1808 engraving by Samuel John Stump

Louisa, Countess of Craven, originally Louisa Brunton (1782–1860), was an English actress.

== Birth and background ==
Her father, John Brunton (1741-1819), son of a soap dealer in Norwich, was at one time a grocer in Drury Lane. He became an actor, and appeared at Covent Garden Theatre, 11 April 1774, as Cyrus, and, 3 May 1774, as Hamlet. He then played at Norwich and at Bath, Somerset, becoming ultimately manager of the Norwich theatre. Louisa Brunton was the one of seven sisters, Ann Brunton Merry, an actress, married Robert Merry. Elizabeth (1771-1799), also an actress, married Peter Columbine.

Her eldest brother, John Brunton (1775–1849), also became an actor-manager; he married Anna Ross, the sister of Frances Mary Ross. John and Anna's eldest daughter was the actress Elizabeth Yates.

According to some biographers, she was born in February 1785; but the date may have been two or three years earlier.

== Stage career ==
In September 1803 it was reported that Brunton had been engaged by Covent Garden Theatre for the season on £10 per week. Her brother, who appeared at Covent Garden 22 September 1800 as Brunton the younger, was with her during her entire time at the theatre. On 5 October 1803 Brunton made her first stage appearance, at Covent Garden, playing Lady Townley in The Provoked Husband to the Lord Townley of Kemble and Lady Grace of Mrs Siddons. On 2 November she played Beatrice in Much Ado about Nothing and it was said 'her archness, vivacity, and spirit of the part, were well depicted. She was the original creator of some roles in pieces of Thomas Morton, and William Dimond.

On 21 October 1807 she played Clara Sedley in Frederick Reynolds's comedy The Rage. This is the last appearance recorded by John Genest.

== Marriage ==
Brunton left the stage aged 22–25 in December 1807, and married, 12 December 1807, William Craven, 1st Earl of Craven at his house in Berkeley Square, London. After the death of her husband, 30 July 1825, she lived in privacy, and died, almost forgotten, 27 August 1860.

== See also ==
- List of entertainers who married titled Britons

== Notes ==
Attribution

This article incorporates text from a publication now in the public domain: Stephen, Leslie, ed. (1888). "Craven, Louisa". Dictionary of National Biography. Vol. 13. London: Smith, Elder & Co.
