= Charles Reece Pemberton =

British actor, dramatist and lecturer

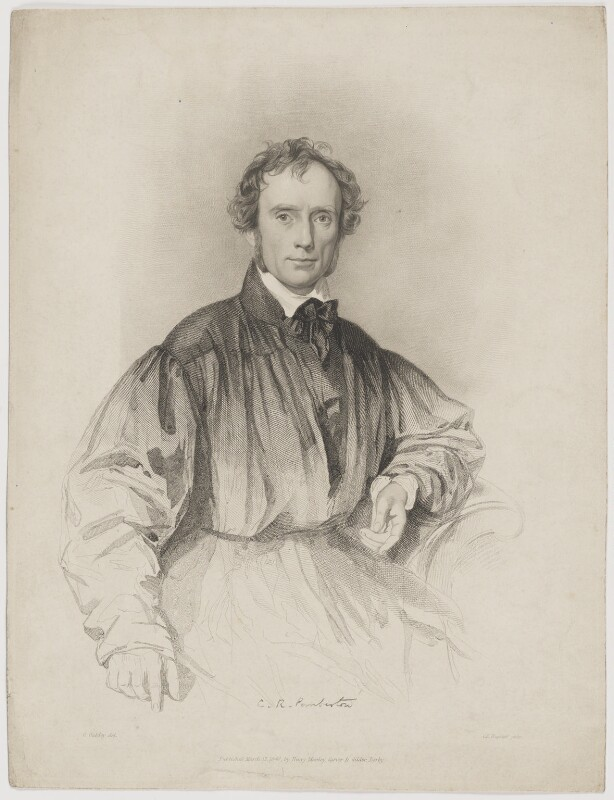
Charles Reece Pemberton

Charles Reece Pemberton (23 January 1790 – 3 March 1840) was a British actor, dramatist and lecturer.

== Early life ==
Pemberton was born in Pontypool, Monmouthshire, in 1790, the second of three children. His mother was Welsh, and his father was from Warwickshire; his uncle was a brassfounder in Birmingham. (The later theatrical writer Thomas Edgar Pemberton was of the same family). When Charles was about four years old, his parents moved to Birmingham, and Pemberton was placed at a unitarian charity school.

He was subsequently apprenticed to his uncle; he ran away in 1807 to Liverpool, where he was seized by a press gang and sent to sea. He served for seven years, seeing some active service off Cadiz, Gibraltar, and Madeira. After the Napoleonic Wars he became an actor, and led a wandering life; he is said to have managed several theatres in the West Indies with some success. He made an unhappy marriage with a lady named Fanny Pritchard, and they soon separated.

== Acting and lecturing ==
By 1827 Pemberton was in England again, acting, lecturing, and reciting. In February 1828 he played Macbeth at Bath. John Genest wrote "he acted tolerably, but nothing farther; he had an indifferent figure, and a bad face, with no expression in it; he had studied the part with great attention, and understood it thoroughly." During the same year he was acting at Hereford during the assizes; Thomas Talfourd was greatly impressed with his performances, and praised him highly in The New Monthly Magazine for September 1828, especially his rendering of Shylock and Virginius. He also played Hotspur, Sir Peter Teazle, and other characters, but was not successful in comic parts.

On Talfourd's recommendation, he was engaged at Covent Garden by Charles Kemble. In March 1829 he made his first appearance there as Virginius, and later that month played Shylock. There was much divergence among critics as to his merits, but Talfourd still eulogised him as a tragedian.

Pemberton did not, however, reappear at Covent Garden; and, after an engagement at the Theatre Royal, Birmingham, he devoted himself to lecturing and reciting, principally at mechanics' institutes. His favourite subjects were the tragic characters of Shakespeare. "Since Pemberton's day," wrote George Holyoake, "I have heard hundreds of lecturers and preachers in England and America, but never one who had the animation, the inspiration, and the spontaneous variety he had". In 1833 he began writing in the Monthly Repository, then edited by William Johnson Fox, The Autobiography of Pel. Verjuice, in which he gave an account of his own experiences.

== Failing health and death ==
In 1836 he played Macbeth and Shylock at Birmingham, and at the end of the year visited the Mediterranean on account of his health. He recommenced lecturing in the summer of 1838 at the Sheffield Mechanics' Institute; but his powers were failing, and a subscription was set on foot to enable him to spend the winter in Egypt. This visit brought about no improvement, and he died, not long after his return, on 3 March 1840, at the house of his younger brother, William Dobson Pemberton, on Ludgate Hill, Birmingham.

Pemberton was buried at Key Hill Cemetery, and the Birmingham Mechanics' Institute, of which George Holyoake was secretary, placed a memorial, with an epitaph by William Johnson Fox, over his grave. Ebenezer Elliott, known as the "corn law rhymer", wrote some verses on him entitled "Poor Charles".

== Works ==
He directed that all his manuscripts, except three plays, should be destroyed.

The Life and Literary Remains of Charles Reece Pemberton (1843), edited by John Fowler, with a memoir by William Johnson Fox, contains:

- The Autobiography of Pel. Verjuice
- The Podesta, a tragedy in five acts
- The Banner, a tragedy in five acts
- Two Catherines, a comedy in five acts
- Other pieces in prose and verse
