= Ebenezer Landells =

British artist (1808-1860)

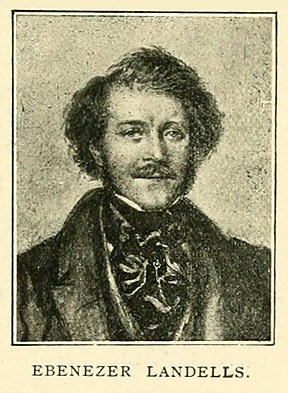

Ebenezer Landells (13 April 1808 – 1 October 1860) was a British wood-engraver, illustrator, and magazine proprietor.

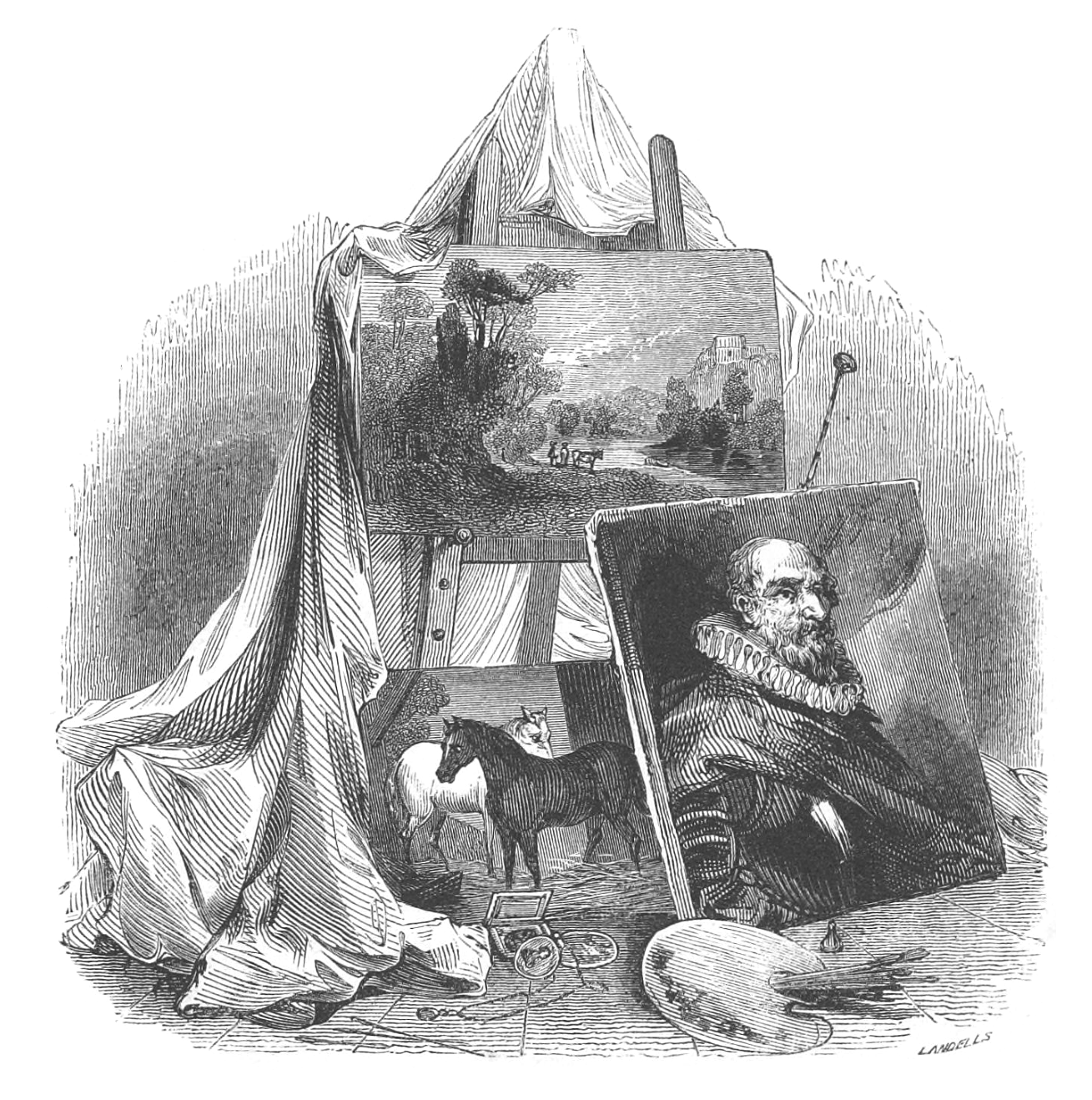
Vignette engraved by Landells from the title-page of The Art of Painting by John Cawse (1840)

== Life ==
Born in Newcastle, Landells was apprenticed to the wood-engraver Thomas Bewick. In 1829 he moved to London, and before long managed to start his own engraving workshop. After attempting a short-lived fashion journal, Cosmorama, he joined with the journalist Henry Mayhew and the printer William Last to found Punch in 1841. Initial difficulties forced Landells to sell his one-third share to the publishers Bradbury & Evans; after the new owners replaced Landells with Joseph Swain as chief engraver, Landells responded with a pamphlet entitled A Word with Punch (1847).

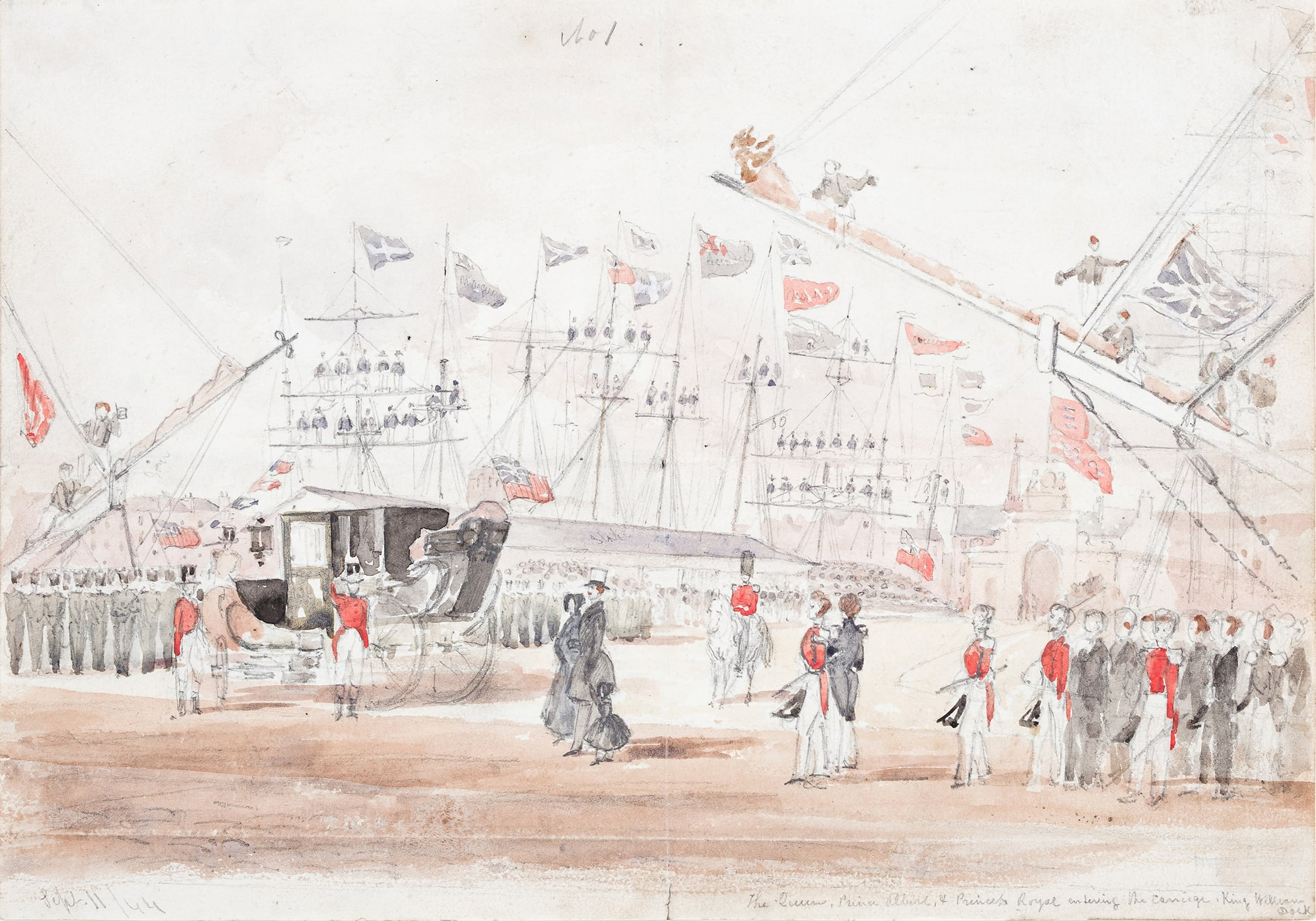
The Queen, Prince Albert, & Princess Royal on leaving the Carriage, King William Dock, sketched by Landells in 1844

Herbert Ingram consulted Landells about launching his weekly Illustrated London News in 1842: after a commission to sketch Queen Victoria's first visit to Scotland that year, Landells became the paper's first artistic correspondent and continued to supply prints for the newspaper until his death.

Landells was also involved in several other magazines: the less successful Illuminated Magazine (1843–45), Great Gun (1844, in imitation of Punch), the Lady's Newspaper (1847–63, then incorporated into the Queen), Diogenes (1853, another attempt to imitate Punch), and the Illustrated Inventor. Responding to the growth in the children's book market, he wrote and illustrated several books for children: Boy's Own Toy-Maker (1858), Girl's Own Toy-Maker (1859), and Illustrated Paper Model Maker (1860).

Landells

made a unique contribution to the development of the illustrated magazine in the nineteenth century. He provided the link between Bewick's inspirational use of wood-engraving for artistic purposes and the use of the same technology for the mass market.

He died at Victoria Grove, West Brompton, in south-west London on 1 October 1860 and was buried on the western side of Highgate Cemetery. The grave (no.420) no longer has a headstone or any memorial.

Landells Road in London's East Dulwich is purported to be named after him.

== Family ==
He was married, on 9 January 1832, at New St. Pancras Church, London, to Anne, eldest daughter of Robert McLegan of London. His son, Robert Thomas Landells, was also an illustrator, and married the daughter of composer George Rodwell.
