= Samuel John Stump =

English painter

Samuel John Stump (c. 1779 – 1863) was an English painter, who was born at Corsham, Wiltshire, and baptised there on 2 September 1779, the youngest son of John and Betty Stump of Corsham, Wiltshire.

He studied in the schools of the Royal Academy, and for many years was a prominent miniature-painter. He had an extensive theatrical clientele.

== Works ==
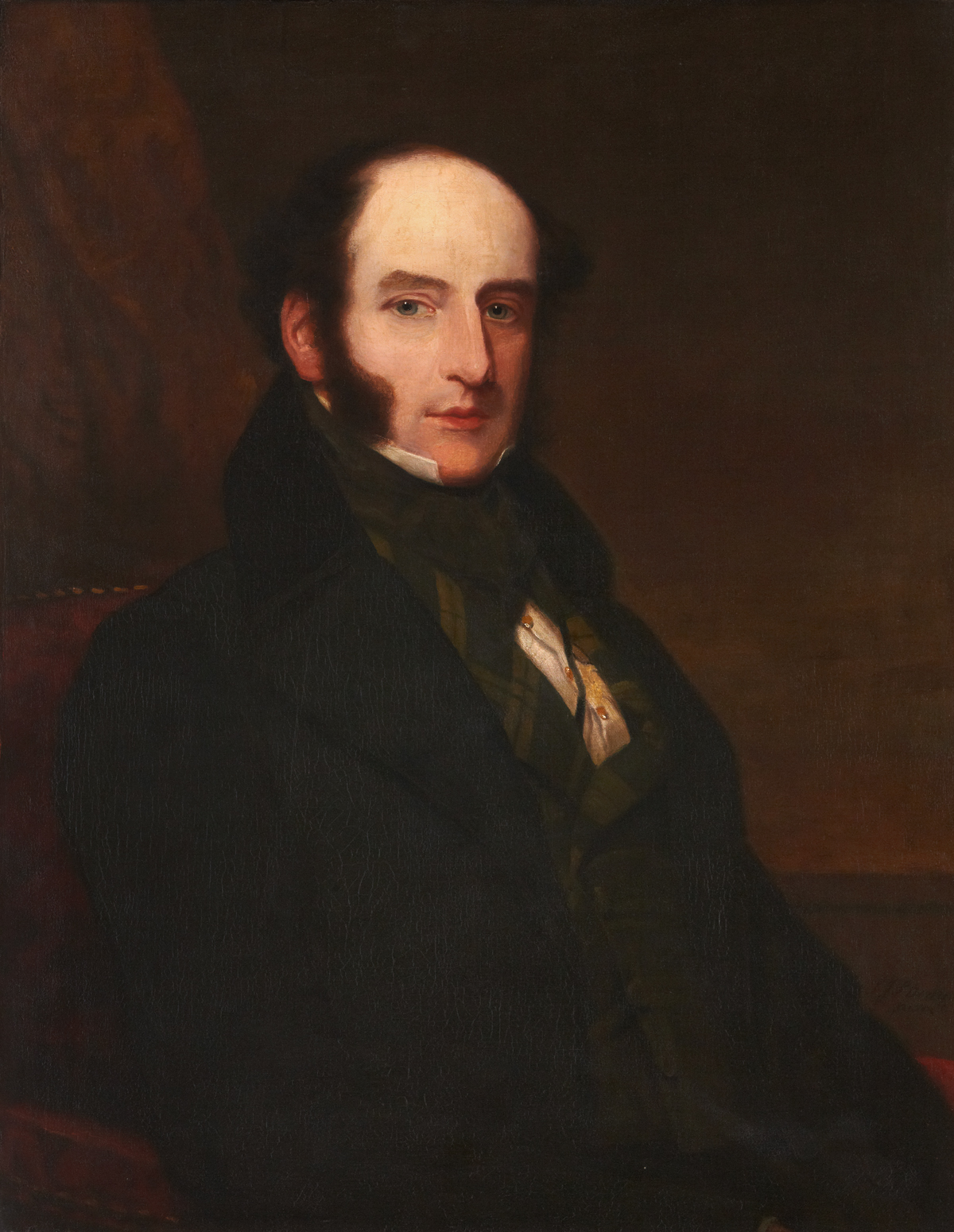
Robert Liston, 1847 portrait by Samuel John Stump

Stump's portraits of stage celebrities, some of them in character, were numerous. He was an annual exhibitor at the Royal Academy from 1802 to 1845, sending mostly miniatures, with a few oil portraits and views. He also exhibited miniatures with the Oil and Watercolour Society during its existence from 1813 to 1820.

Stump also practised landscape-painting largely, and sent views of English, Italian, and Swiss scenery to the British Institution up to 1849. He was a member of the Sketching Society, and his Enchanted Isle was lithographed for the set of Evening Sketches issued by it. His portraits of Lady Audley, Anna Maria Gulston née Knowles, Richard Miles the collector, George Frederick Cooke, Harriot Mellon, Louisa Brunton, and others were engraved, some of them by himself in stipple. His miniature self-portrait belonged to the Corporation of London.
