= Thomas Shaftoe Robertson =

19th-century actor

- Born: 2 August 1765; Alford
- Died: 1831 (aged 65–66)
- Occupations: actor and manager
- Spouse: Frances Mary Ross (m. 1793)

Thomas Shaftoe Robertson (1765 – September 1831) was a British actor who became the manager of a circuit of theatres in and around Lincolnshire that he carried on for nearly half a century. He was able to attract well-known London actors to take parts in plays that he produced. His actress wife, Fanny Robertson, took over the Lincoln circuit upon his death.

== Early life and career ==
Robertson was the son of James Shaftoe Robertson (died c. 1787), a theatre manager, and Ann née Fowler (died 18 April 1803). From a young age, he and his youngest brother James (1771–1831) took part in theatrical productions; he appeared at York before his fifth birthday. Thomas and James had a middle brother, George Fowler Robertson (1774–1843). On 8 September 1793, Robertson married actress Frances Mary Ross later known as Fanny Robertson. Their nephew was William Shaftoe Robertson, whose children included the playwright T. W. Robertson and the actress Dame Madge Kendal.

Following the death of his father, and his mother passing the management to him, Robertson entered into a theatre management partnership with James Edward Miller. An advertisement in the Stamford Mercury on 31 August 1787 stated:

Theatre, Lincoln. By Mssrs. Miller and Robertson's Company. On Wednesday 12th September Such Things Are; and The Padlock; on the 13th He would a soldier Be with Patrick in Prussia; On Friday 14th Gamester; with Peeping Tom of Coventry. Mr. Miller... informing his Friends and Public in general, that having Messrs. Green and Whitfield's shares of the Company, has undertaken the Management; assures them, he and the other Proprietor will exert every effort to render the Theatrical Amusements worthy their Attention, by procuring Novelty and bringing a well-regulated Company. Mrs. Robertson most gratefully returns her most sincere Thanks to her Friends and Public in general, for the Support she has received from them since her Husband's decease; at the same Time informs them, her son being returned from the Theatre Royal, Norwich, she has resigned her Management to him. ...

Robertson is credited with the painting of "A New, Grand, Transparent View of the Besieging, Storming, and Taking of Valenciennes" used in the Stamford theatre in May 1794. The Stamford Mercury, on 11 March 1796, carried an announcement by a Dr E. Laycock and a Mr. William Bousfield Charles Lowe, Junr, of Boston acknowledging that rumours had circulated alleging that Miller had "dishonestly acted towards Mr. Robertson". The piece witnessed that Robertson declared to Laycock and Lowe that he "had no Accusation whatever to make against Mr. Miller, and that such Reports never came from him." Nevertheless, the partnership with Miller ended the following week; Robertson bought Miller out and took a new partner, Robert Henry Franklin (1770–1802), as announced in the Stamford Mercury of 18 March 1796.

== 19th century ==
Franklin died at the age of 32 in Peterborough on 26 June 1802, leaving his shares in trust for a son; one of his executors was Robertson.

Robertson would take any necessary steps to protect his actors as demonstrated by another report in the Stamford Mercury: "We are glad to find that the person who threw a glass at Mrs. Robertson from the gallery of the theatre, December last, is made sensible of his offense (see the advertisement in this page) praise is due to Mr. Robertson for the steps which we understand he immediately took to punish this man for his conduct, and we hope they will be an example to the public, to show Mr. Robertson's determination to prevent repetition of offenses, and to preserve uninterrupted the peace of his theatre". Robertson was a Freemason and is described as Brother Robertson in handbills and newspaper adverts, which refer to the arrangements for the local lodges and visiting brethren to meet at a local pub or inn before attending the theatre. For example, a Wisbech lodge were to meet at the Spread Eagle before a performance of The Merchant of Venice in May 1813 at Wisbech theatre.

Lincoln opened its New Theatre on 10 September 1806 with an address spoken by Robertson, followed by performances over the next three days. The theatre venues in the Lincoln circuit varied over time, but at some point included theatres in Lincoln, Boston, Grantham, Peterborough, Newark, Oundle, Spalding, Huntingdon, Wisbech, and other nearby towns. Robertson would bring performers well known from London appearances onto the Lincoln circuit. For example, in 1808 he booked the Young Roscius (Master Betty) to appear at Huntingdon, Peterborough and Wisbech shortly before he retired from the stage for the first time. Robertson took his company to the Whittlesey theatre for Whitsun Week in 1811, following their season in Wisbech.

While he was in Lincoln Castle Gaol for debt in 1816 supporters aided him and his wife by putting on amateur productions and benefits, purchasing the theatrical travelling property sold by auction on 1 August, and appointing him their manager. In August 1816 amateur performances took place in Wisbech, Grantham and Lincoln to raise funds to re-establish Robertson's company. The performances at Wisbech included Douglas and the farcical musical piece The Farmer and The Poor Gentleman. His brother James brought his theatre company to perform at Lincoln Race Week and to use any profits to help re-establish the theatrical circuit. Some landlords even reduced the rents of their theatres, according to a handbill promoting Speed the Plough and Chip of the Old Block, to be performed in April 1817 at the Wisbech theatre.

Maria Foote appeared at Robertson's Lincoln theatre in November 1828. On her first night she played Olivia in Bold Stroke for a Husband and Variella in The Weathercock. Robertson opened the New Theatre, Whittlesey, on 24 May 1831 with Speed the Plough and the farce The Happiest Day of My Life. The company did not return there for a second season.

He died, aged 66, and was buried on 3 September 1831 in Huntingdon. His widow, as Mrs T. Robertson, took over running the Robertson theatre company.
