= Nicolò Gabrielli =

Italian opera composer

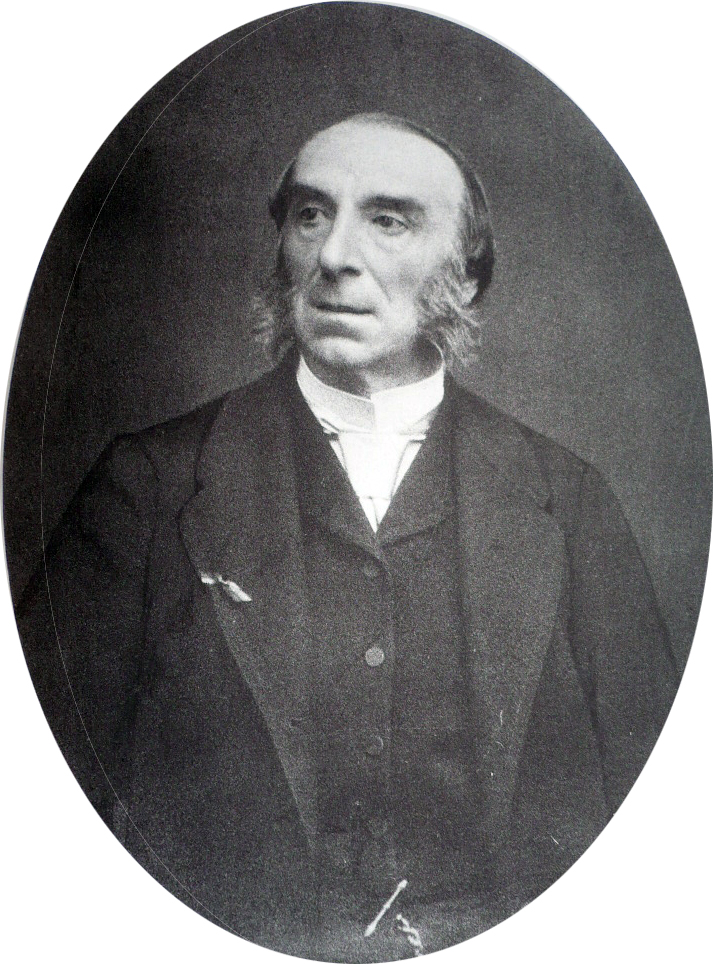
Nicolò Gabrielli

Count Nicolò Gabrielli di Quercita (21 February 1814 – 14 June 1891) was an Italian opera composer.

Nicolò Gabrielli composed the triumphal march Simón Bolívar to celebrate the 100th anniversary of El Libertador's birth (1883)

== Biography ==
Born in Naples, at the time when the city was the capital of the Kingdom of the Two Sicilies, Nicolò Gabrielli was the scion of a distinguished yet decayed aristocratic family originally from Gubbio and settled thereafter in Tropea and Palermo. He showed since his early childhood a talent for music that led him to enter the Naples conservatory where he studied under the supervision of Nicola Zingarelli and Gaetano Donizetti. He dedicated himself especially to musical composition, and debuted in August 1835 with a melodrama in Neapolitan dialect, I dotti per fanatismo.

Nicolò Gabrielli was a very prolific composer, and from 1835 onwards worked at many melodramas, opera buffas, commedias and farsas, including La lettera perduta (1836), Il Cid (1836), La parola di matrimonio (1837), L'americano in fiera ossia Farvest Calelas (1837), Vinclinda (1837), L'affamato senza danaro (1839), Edwige o Il sogno (1839), Il padre della debuttante (1839), La marchesa e il ballerino (1839), Nadan o L'orgoglio punito (1839), L'assedio di Sciraz ossia L'amor materno (1840), Basilio III Demetriovitz (1841), Il bugiardo veritiero (1841), Il condannato di Saragozza (1842), La zingara (1842), Carlo di Rovenstein (1843), L'assedio di Leyda (1843), Sara ovvero La pazza delle montagne di Scozia (1843), Il gemello (1845), Una passeggiata sul palchetto a vapore verso Capri (1845), Giulia di Tolosa (1846), Il vampiro (1848), Bradamante e Ruggero (1849), Fiorina (1849), La regina delle rose (1850).

He also worked at several ballets, including Ester d'Engaddi (1837), Il rajah di Benares (1839), that, similarly to other later works, was composed and represented in occasion of the birthday of Ferdinand II of the Two Sicilies, Amore alla prova (1839), Il duca di Ravenna (1841), Giaffar (1841), Olga di Cracovia (1841), L'istituto delle fanciulle (1841), Il gobbo del Giappone (1841), La conquista del Messico (1842), Erissena (1845), L'orfanella africana (1845), Merope (1846), Alcidoro (1847), Ifigenia in Aulide (1847), Il trionfo d'amore (1848), Olema (1848), Paquita (1848), Gisella (1849), I Candiano (1849), Schariar ovvero Le mille e una notte (1849), Mocanna (1850), La stella del marinajo (1851). Other ballets were Le spose veneziane and Stefano re di Napoli.

In 1840 he was appointed musical director of the Royal Theatre of San Carlo in Naples, a position that enabled him to travel all over Italy and abroad and make acquaintance with the international society. In 1854 he was invited by Napoleon III to join the imperial court in Paris, where he debuted at the Opéra with a ballet, Gemma (1854, libretto by Théophile Gautier and choreography by former ballerina Fanny Cerrito). Other works followed, including I paggi del Conte di Provenza (1856), Les elfes (1856), La ninfa Cloe (1857), Don Grégoire ou Le précepteur dans l'embarras (1859), Melissa, ossia I viaggiatori all'isola incantata (1859), Le petit cousin (1860), L'étoile de Messine (1861), Les memoirs de Fanchette (1865). His last work to be represented in a theatre was La fin du monde (1865).

The popularity of the comte Gabrielli, as he was known in the aristocratic and artistic circles du tout Paris, gradually decreased after the fall of Napoleon III and the advent of the Third French Republic. A staunch Bonapartist, he went into semi-secluded retirement in his Paris apartment, but still composed the military march Simon Bolívar (1883), and dedicated it to the President of Venezuela, Antonio Guzmán Blanco. A cantique composed by Nicolò Gabrielli was adopted by the Protestant communities of the French-speaking part of Switzerland as their unofficial hymn, and was later included in the work Chants populaires de Suisse romande pour voix mixtes, published at Geneva in 1887.

Nicolò Gabrielli was appointed Knight of the French Legion of Honor and Knight of the Spanish Order of Charles III, both in 1864. He died in Paris in 1891 and was buried in the Montparnasse cemetery. His remains were later moved to the Père Lachaise cemetery in the eastern part of the French capital.

== Works ==
=== Melodramas, opera buffas, commedias and farsas ===
- I dotti per fanatismo (1835)
- La lettera perduta (1836)
- Il Cid (1836)
- La parola di matrimonio (1837)
- L'americano in fiera ossia Farvest Calelas (1837)
- Vinclinda (1837)
- L'affamato senza danaro (1839)
- Edwige o Il sogno (1839)
- Il padre della debuttante (1839)
- La marchesa e il ballerino (1839)
- Nadan o L'orgoglio punito (1839)
- L'assedio di Sciraz ossia L'amor materno (1840)
- Cante dei Gabrielli (1840)
- Basilio III Demetriovitz (1841)
- Il bugiardo veritiero (1841)
- Il condannato di Saragozza (1842)
- La zingara (1842)
- Carlo di Rovenstein (1843)
- L'assedio di Leyda (1843)
- Sara ovvero La pazza di Scozia (1843)
- Una domenica a Torre del Greco (first part of the Trittico napoletano, 1844)
- Il gemello (1845)
- Una passeggiata sul palchetto a vapore verso Capri (second part of the Trittico napoletano, 1845)
- Giulia di Tolosa (1846)
- L'ascensione al cratere del Vesuvio (third part of the Trittico napoletano, 1847)
- Bradamante e Ruggero (1849)
- Fiorina (1849)
- Il sogno di un emiro (1850)
- La regina delle rose (1850)
- Melissa, ossia I viaggiatori all'isola incantata (1859)
- Le petit cousin (1860)
- Les memoirs de Fanchette (1865)

=== Ballets ===
- Il ritorno d'Ulisse (1836)
- Ester d'Engaddi (1837)
- Il rajah di Benares (1839)
- Amore alla prova (1839)
- Le nozze di un mostro (1839)
- Il duca di Ravenna (1841)
- Giaffar (1841)
- Olga di Cracovia (1841)
- L'istituto delle fanciulle (1841)
- Il gobbo del Giappone (1841)
- La conquista del Messico (1842)
- La zingara (1842)
- I viaggi di Gulliver (1843)
- Erissena (1845)
- L'orfanella africana (1845)
- Merope (1846)
- Alcidoro (1847)
- Ifigenia in Aulide (1847)
- Matilde e Malek-Adhel (1847)
- “Il vampiro” (1848)
- Il trionfo d'amore (1848)
- Olema (1848)
- Paquita (1848)
- Gisella (1849)
- I Candiano (1849)
- Schariar ovvero Le mille e una notte (1849)
- La fedeltà premiata (1850)
- Mocanna (1850)
- La stella del marinajo (1851)
- Gemma (1856)
- I paggi del conte di Provenza (1856)
- Les elfes (1856)
- La ninfa Cloe (1857)
- Don Grégoire ou Le précepteur dans l'embarras (1859)
- L'étoile de Messine (1861)
- La fin du monde (1865)
- Le spose veneziane (?)
- Stefano re di Napoli (?)
- Les almées (?)
- Yotte (?)

=== Military marches ===
- Simon Bolivar (1883)
