= George Rodwell =

English composer, musical director, and author

George Herbert Buonaparte Rodwell (1800–1852), generally known as G. Herbert Rodwell, was an English composer, musical director, and author.

== Life ==
The brother of James Thomas Gooderham Rodwell (died 1825), playwright and lessee of London's Adelphi Theatre, was born in London, 15 November 1800. Despite numerous claims to the contrary in older reference works, Rodwell insisted that his only music teacher had been Henry Rowley Bishop, his most obvious predecessor as a composer for the London theatres. In 1828 Rodwell became professor of harmony and composition at the Royal Academy of Music.

On the death of his brother James in 1825, Rodwell succeeded to the proprietorship of the Adelphi Theatre; but Frederick Henry Yates with Daniel Terry bought him out very shortly afterwards, at a price of £30,000. Rodwell then mainly occupied himself with directing the music at the theatre, and in composition for the stage. His opera The Flying Dutchman was produced at the Adelphi in 1826, and The Cornish Miners at the English Opera House in 1827.

In 1836 Rodwell was appointed director of music at Covent Garden Theatre, where his farce Teddy the Tiler, from the French Pierre ou le Couvreur (Nicolas Brazier and Pierre-Frédéric-Adolphe Carmouche), had been performed in 1830. The Covent Garden management tried to anticipate the repertory of the Theatre Royal, Drury Lane; and Rodwell, though friendly with Alfred Bunn, the Drury Lane manager, sailed close to the wind in this regard. When Daniel Auber's opera The Bronze Horse, was announced at Drury Lane, he brought out at Covent Garden an opera on the same theme, with music by himself.

Rodwell's efforts to establish a British national opera, launched through the Royal Society of Musicians, had no lasting result. For many years he lived at Brompton. He died, aged 52, at Upper Ebury Street, Pimlico, on 22 January 1852, and was buried in Brompton cemetery.

== Works ==
Rodwell wrote 40 to 50 musical pieces for the stage, besides songs, works on musical theory, romances, farces, and novels. Exponents of his ballads included Mary Anne Keeley, Harriet Waylett, and Mary Ann Paton. In some cases Rodwell wrote the words as well as the music for his stage pieces. His principal librettist was Edward Fitzball; but John Baldwin Buckstone, James Kenney, and Richard Brinsley Peake also supplied him with romances, burlettas, operettas, and incidental songs, for musical setting. Among his publications were:

- Songs of the Birds, 1827.
- First Rudiments of Harmony, 1831.
- Letter to the Musicians of Great Britain, 1833.
- Memoirs of an Umbrella, a novel, 1846.

Rodwell composed and arranged the music for the melodrama Jack Sheppard (1839), John Baldwin Buckstone’s dramatization of the novel by William Harrison Ainsworth based on the eponymous real-life character. An adaptation by David Chandler and Valerie Langfield was recorded and commercially released by Retrospect Opera in 2023.

== Family ==
Rodwell's marriage with Emma Liston, the daughter of John Liston the comedian, may have helped him professionally, but was thought unhappy. Elizabeth Ann, their youngest daughter, married the illustrator Robert Thomas Landells, son of Ebenezer Landells.

== Notes ==
Attribution

This article incorporates text from a publication now in the public domain: Lee, Sidney, ed. (1897). "Rodwell, George Herbert Buonaparte". Dictionary of National Biography. Vol. 49. London: Smith, Elder & Co.
