= Frederick Henry Yates =

English actor and theatre manager

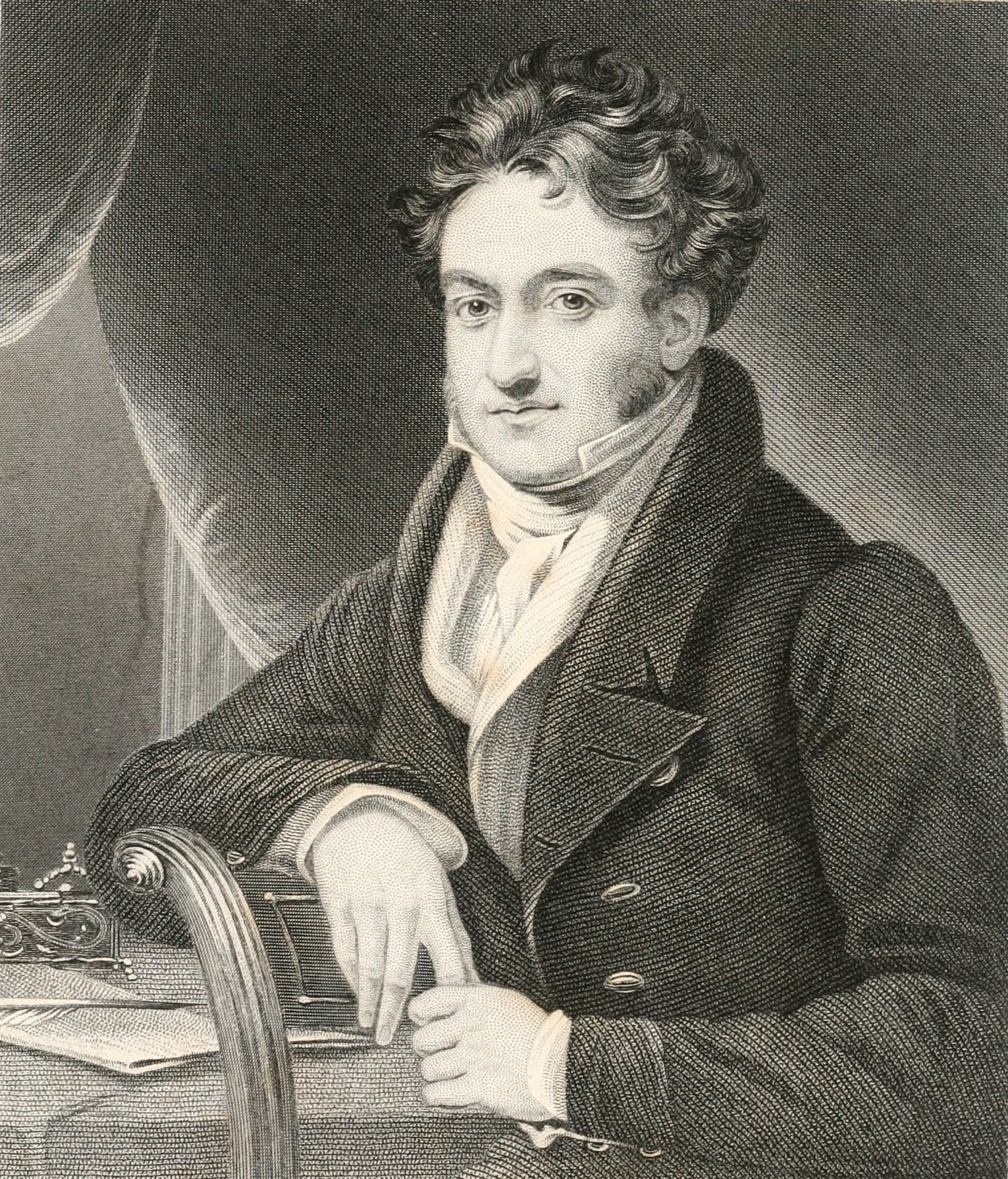
Frederick Henry Yates, engraved by Joseph Brown after a portrait by James Lonsdale

Frederick Henry Yates (4 February 1797 – 21 June 1842) was an English actor and theatre manager.

== Life ==
Yates was born in London, the youngest son of Thomas Yates, a tobacco manufacturer, of Thames Street and Russell Square. Frederick was educated at a preparatory school at Winchmore Hill and at Charterhouse School (at the former meeting John Reeve, whom he would later work with) before joining the commissariat department. In that job he was with Wellington in the Peninsular War and possibly at the battle of Waterloo.

When peace came, he met Charles Mathews at a fancy ball before accompanying him on a trip to France in winter 1817/18 and becoming an actor on his advice (his first stage appearance was in Boulogne during the trip). He then appeared at Edinburgh before making his London debut on 7 November 1818 at the Theatre Royal, Covent Garden, where he remained until 1824/25. Through his marriage he was related to the Robertsons who ran the Lincoln and Stamford theatrical circuits, it was not long before he was able to take productions on tour.

James Rodwell, who was the lessee of the Adelphi Theatre, died in 1824 or 1825, and the lease passed to his brother George Herbert Buonaparte Rodwell; it then came on the market, and Yates with Daniel Terry bought it, at a price of £30,000. They opened it on 10 October 1825 with Killigrew, for which they both were in the cast: it included also Benjamin Wrench, John Reeve, and Fanny Elizabeth Fitzwilliam. Yates put on a three-act production of Yates Laughable Entertainments at Stamford Theatre on 13 and 14 June 1827 and Popular Entertainments on 25 and 26 June in Lincoln theatre. In 1829 he brought over a female elephant from Paris to star in the Adelphi theatre and she brought in crowds, its debut in The Elephant of Siam and the Fire Fiend was reported as one of the most successful ever with the walls of the theatre actually shaking from the thunders of applause. Yates took it on tour in 1830 when in August in Newcastle the elephant killed one of its keepers and seriously injured the other. In 1833 he brought with him Harriet Waylett to perform at King's Lynn theatre.

Yates managed the Adelphi until his retirement from management in 1842 (seven years after his patron Mathews' death in 1835). He also co-managed the Caledonian Theatre, later renamed the Adelphi, on Leith Walk in Edinburgh (with William Henry Murray, 1830–31), the Colosseum in Regent's Park (with John Braham, 1835). He was still acting until the time of his death on 21 June 1842, having just arrived at Euston Square by train, and was buried at St Martin in the Fields.

== Family ==
Yates married the actress Elizabeth Brunton (21 July 1799 – 30 August 1860) daughter of John Brunton, manager of the Exeter theatre on 7 December 1823. Their son Edmund Hodgson Yates become a journalist, playwright and novelist.
