= Thomas Edgar Pemberton =

English theatre historian and playwright

Thomas Edgar Pemberton (1 July 1849 – 28 September 1905) was an English novelist, playwright and theatrical historian.

== Early career ==
Born on 1 July 1849, he was the eldest son of Thomas Pemberton, the head of an old-established firm of brass founders in Livery Street, Birmingham. A brother was the novelist Max Pemberton. (The earlier actor and lecturer Charles Reece Pemberton was of the same family.) After education at schools in Edgbaston, Pemberton at nineteen entered his father's firm, and in due course gained control of the business, with which he was connected until 1900.

Pemberton married on 11 March 1873, in the Old Meeting House, Birmingham, Mary Elizabeth, second daughter of Edward Richard Patie Townley of Edgbaston.

Of literary taste from youth, Pemberton long divided his time between commerce and varied literary endeavours. His novels Charles Lysaght: a Novel devoid of Novelty (1873) and Under Pressure (1874) were less well regarded than his later novel A Very Old Question (3 volumes, 1877). There followed Born to Blush Unseen (1879) and an allegorical fairytale, Fair-brass, written for his children.

At his father's house he met in youth Edward Askew Sothern, Madge Kendal and other players on visits to Birmingham, and he soon tried his hand at drama. His comedietta Weeds, the first of a long list of ephemeral pieces, mainly farcical, was written for the Kendals, and produced at the Prince of Wales's Theatre, Birmingham, opening on 16 November 1874. His many plays were rarely seen outside provincial theatres.

== Collaboration with Bret Harte ==
He came to know Bret Harte, and his successful play Sue was adapted with Bret Harte's collaboration from the latter's story The Judgment of Bolinas Plain. It was produced in America in 1896, and in London at the Garrick Theatre, opening on 10 June 1898. Held Up, a four-act play by Harte and Pemberton, was produced at the Worcester Theatre, opening on 24 August 1903. On Bret Harte's death in 1902, Pemberton wrote Bret Harte: a Treatise and a Tribute.

He succeeded his friend Sam Timmins as the drama critic of the Birmingham Daily Post from 1882 until he retired to Broadway, Worcestershire, in 1900.

== Theatrical biographies and other works ==
Pemberton published Dickens's London (1875), Charles Dickens and the Stage (1888), and The Birmingham Theatres: a Local Retrospect (1889). He made his widest reputation as a theatrical biographer, writing memoirs of Edward Askew Sothern (1889), the Kendals (1891), T. W. Robertson (1892), John Hare (1895), Ellen Terry and her sisters (1902), and Sir Charles Wyndham (1905). He was personally familiar with most of his subjects.

Pemberton frequently lectured on theatrical subjects. In 1889 he was elected a governor of the Shakespeare Memorial Theatre, Stratford-on-Avon, and showed much interest in its work.

He died after a long illness at his home in Broadway on 28 September 1905, and was buried in the churchyard there. His wife survived him, with two sons and three daughters.
