= Joseph Lunn =

English dramatist (1784-1863)

Joseph Lunn (9 April 1784 – 12 December 1863) was an English dramatist, mostly of comedies and farces. Many of them were produced at the Haymarket Theatre in London.

== Life ==
Lunn was born in Woolwich in 1784, son of William Lunn and his wife Mary.

He was an original member of the Dramatic Authors' Society. He lived for some time in Craven Street, London. He died at Grand Parade, Brighton, on 12 December 1863, aged 79.

=== Family ===
He married in 1815 Elizabeth Wallbridge, and they had two sons Their elder son, William Arthur Brown Lunn, under the pseudonym Arthur Wallbridge, wrote several humorous works. He also invented in 1843 a "sequential keyboard".

== Works ==
Lunn's earliest work, The Sorrows of Werther, a burlesque, with music by Henry Bishop, was produced at Covent Garden in May 1818, with John Liston and his wife in the chief parts. It was revived at St James's Theatre in October 1836, but apparently remained unpublished.

Liston achieved more conspicuous success in four pieces by Lunn, produced at the Haymarket Theatre between 1822 and 1825:

- Family Jars, a farce in one act, with music by George Perry, produced in August 1822. It was performed 19 times and printed both at New York and in London, in Lacy's Acting Edition of Plays (volume 14, 1850);
- Fish out of Water, a laughable farce in one act, produced in August 1823, performed 28 times, and printed both in Helsenberg's Modern English Comic Theatre, (5th series, 1843), and in Lacy (volume 16);
- Hide and Seek, petit opéra, adapted from French, in two acts (the dialogue in prose), produced in October 1824, revived at Covent Garden in November 1830, and printed in Cumberland's British Theatre (1829, volume 12);
- Roses and Thorns, or Two Houses under One Roof, comedy in three acts, produced in August 1825, and printed in Cumberland (volume 12).

Henry Compton also appeared with great success in Family Jars and Fish out of Water, and the latter when revived at the Lyceum Theatre, London in the autumn of 1874, had a run of more than a hundred nights.

Lunn's other works:

- False and Constant, a comedy in two acts, is said to have been given at the Haymarket in June 1823, although unmentioned by John Genest, and again at the Queen's Theatre in November 1829. It is printed in Lacy (volume 16).
- Management, or the Prompter Puzzled, a comic interlude in one act, being a free translation from Le Bénéficiaire, by Théaulon de Lambert and Etienne, was produced at the Haymarket theatre in September 1828, and was published separately in 1830, and again in Richardson's British Drama, and in Cumberland (volume 38).
- The Shepherd of Derwent Vale, or the Innocent Culprit, a traditionary drama in two acts, adapted (and augmented) from the French, given at Drury Lane in February 1825, was issued in London in 1825, and reprinted in Lacy (volume 89).
- Three Deep, or All on the Wing, partly from the French, brought out at Covent Garden in May 1826, was published in Dolby's new series (1826).
- White Lies, or the Major and the Minor, farce in two acts, London, 1826, was produced at Drury Lane in December 1826.
- Capers and Coronets, farce in one act, produced at Queen's Theatre in May 1835, was printed in Duncombe's British Theatre (volume 17, 1825).
- Sharp Practice, or the Lear of Cripplegate, a serio-comic drama in one act, printed in Lacy (volume 55).
- Horæ Jocosæ, or the Doggrel Decameron, being ten facetious tales in verse, to which are added some miscellaneous pieces (1823).
