= 1806 in literature =

This article contains information about the literary events and publications of 1806.

== Events ==
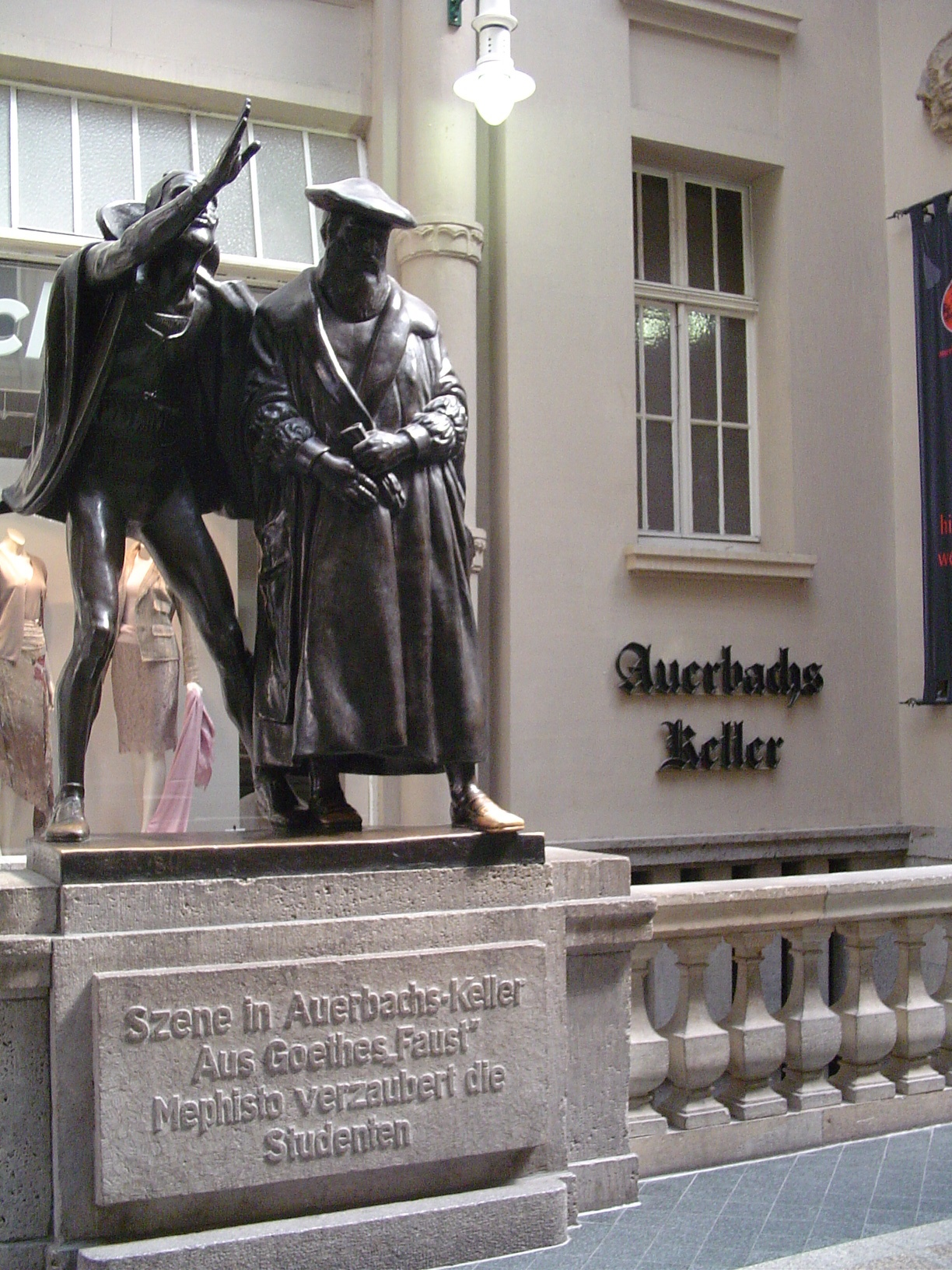
Sculpture of Mephistopheles bewitching the students in the scene "Auerbachs Keller" from Goethe's Faust, at the entrance of what is today the restaurant Auerbachs Keller in Leipzig

- July – Following publication of Irish-born poet Thomas Moore's Epistles, Odes, and Other Poems, Francis Jeffrey denounces it in this month's Edinburgh Review as "licentious". Moore challenges Jeffrey to a duel in London but their confrontation is interrupted by officials and they become friends.
- November 23 – Sir Roger Newdigate dies, leaving a bequest that funds the foundation of the Newdigate Prize for English Poetry at the University of Oxford. The first winner is John Wilson ("Christopher North").
- December 29 – Thomas John Dibdin's pantomime Harlequin and Mother Goose; or, The Golden Egg opens at the Covent Garden Theatre in London, starring Joseph Grimaldi. It runs for 111 performances.
- unknown dates
  - Noah Webster publishes his first English dictionary, A Compendious Dictionary of the English Language, recording distinct American spellings.
  - Johann Wolfgang von Goethe completes a preliminary version of his Faust.
  - Nólsoyar Páll completes his anti-Danish Fuglakvæði (Ballad of the Birds), one of the first significant works in the Faroese language. The Ballad is a 229-stanza work in which birds of prey symbolise the Danish authorities, and the poet himself warns the smaller birds in the guise of an oystercatcher, which was later chosen to be the national bird of the Faroe Islands. The ballad said in poetic form what could not have been said in plain speech; it sold many copies.

== New books ==
=== Fiction ===
- Harriet Butler – Vensenshon
- Sophie Ristaud Cottin – Elisabeth, ou les Exilés de Sibérie
- Catherine Cuthbertson – Santo Sebastiano
- Charlotte Dacre – Zofloya
- Maria Edgeworth – Leonora
- Rachel Hunter – Lady Maclairn, the Victim of Villany
- Francis Lathom – The Mysterious Freebooter
- Matthew Gregory Lewis – Feudal Tyrants
- Sydney Owenson – The Wild Irish Girl
- Louisa Stanhope – Montbrasil Abbey
- Thomas Skinner Surr – Winter in London

=== Children and young people ===
- Elizabeth Dawbarn – Young Person's Assistant in Reading the Old Testament
- Ann Taylor and Jane Taylor – Rhymes for the Nursery

=== Drama ===
- John Till Allingham – The Romantic Lover
- Richard Cumberland – A Hint to Husbands
- Thomas Dibdin – Five Miles Off
- Thomas Holcroft – The Vindictive Man
- Heinrich von Kleist – The Broken Jug (Der zerbrochne Krug, written)
- George Manners – Edgar
- Leandro Fernández de Moratín – The Maidens' Consent (El sí de las niñas, first performed)

=== Non-fiction ===
- J. C. Adelung – Mithridates, a History of Language and Dialects
- Johann Gottlieb Fichte – Bericht über die Wissenschaftslehre
- James Madison – An Examination of the British Doctrine which Subjects to Capture a Neutral Trade not Open in Time of Peace
- Maria Rundell (as A Lady) – A New System of Domestic Cookery
- Jane West – Letters to a Young Lady

== Births ==
- January 17 – William Saunders, Welsh poet and printer (died 1851)
- February 1 – Jane Williams (Ysgafell), Welsh poet, folklorist and historian (died 1885)
- February 25 – Emma Catherine Embury, American author and poet (died 1863)
- March 6 – Elizabeth Barrett Browning, English poet (died 1861)
- March 26 – James Hogg, Scottish editor and publisher (died 1888)
- April 17 – William Gilmore Simms, American author (died 1870)
- May 20 – John Stuart Mill, English political economist and philosopher (died 1873)
- July 20 – John Sterling, Scottish essayist and poet (died 1844)
- July 22 – Johann Kaspar Zeuss, German historian and philologist (died 1856)
- August 31 – Charles Lever, Irish novelist (died 1872)
- November 11 – Georgiana Chatterton, English novelist and travel writer (died 1876)
- November 16 – Mary Tyler Peabody Mann, American education reformer and author (died 1887)
- unknown date – Anne Clarke, Australian theatre manager

== Deaths ==
- February 2 – Nicolas Restif de la Bretonne, French writer (born 1734)
- February 12 – Gabriel-Henri Gaillard, French historian (born 1726)
- February 19 – Elizabeth Carter, English poet, writer and translator (born 1717)
- February 24 – Collin d'Harleville, French dramatist (born 1755)
- March 3 – Heinrich Christian Boie, German poet and editor (born 1744)
- April 4 – Carlo Gozzi, Venetian dramatist (born 1720)
- May 6 – Ann Yearsley, English poet, writer and library proprietor (died 1753)
- October 19 – Henry Kirke White, English poet (born 1785)
- October 28 – Charlotte Turner Smith, English poet and novelist (born 1749)
- November 23 – Sir Roger Newdigate, English antiquary, politician and literary patron (born 1719)
- December 26 – Louis Carrogis Carmontelle, French dramatist (born 1717)

== Sources ==
- Jakob Jakobsen. Poul Nolsöe, lívssøga og irkingar. 12 parts. Tórshavn: Jakobsen, 1908–12. Repr. ed. Chr. Aigens, 1966. OCLC 729098332 (in Faroese)
- Ernst Krenn. Der Föroyische Dichter Páll Nólsoy und sein Vogellied. Illinois Studies in Languages and Literature vol. 23, no. 4. Urbana: University of Illinois Press, 1939. OCLC 459896944 (in German)
- John Frederick West, Faroe: The Emergence of a Nation, London: Hurst, 1972, ISBN 978-0-8397-2063-8
- Jonathan Wylie, The Faroe Islands: Interpretations of History, Lexington, Kentucky: University Press of Kentucky, 1987, ISBN 978-0-8131-1578-8
