= The Vespers of Palermo =

1823 play

- Original language: English
- Written by: Felicia Hemans
- Genre: Tragedy
- Setting: Kingdom of Sicily, 13th century

Premiere
- Date: 12 December 1823
- Place: Theatre Royal, Covent Garden, London

The Vespers of Palermo is an 1823 historical tragedy by the British writer Felicia Hemans. It premiered at the Theatre Royal, Covent Garden on 12 December 1823. The original cast included Charles Mayne Young as Count Di Procida, Charles Kemble as Raimond Di Procida, George John Bennett as Eribert, Frederick Henry Yates as Montalba, William Chapman as Anselmo, Thomas Comer as De Couci, William Claremont as Villager, Sarah Bartley as Vittoria and Frances Harriet Kelly as Constance. It is set against the backdrop of the Sicilian Vespers uprising of 1282 and, like Mary Russell Mitford's Julian of the same year, is strongly influenced by the early stages of the Risorgimento in Italy. Both draw links between Classic or Medieval repression with the defeat of Sicily's failed 1820 uprising against Bourbon rule.

== Bibliography ==
- Burwick, Frederick Goslee, Nancy Moore & Hoeveler Diane Long. The Encyclopedia of Romantic Literature. John Wiley & Sons, 2012.
- Nicoll, Allardyce. A History of Early Nineteenth Century Drama 1800-1850. Cambridge University Press, 1930.
