= Thomas Hill (book collector) =

English book collector

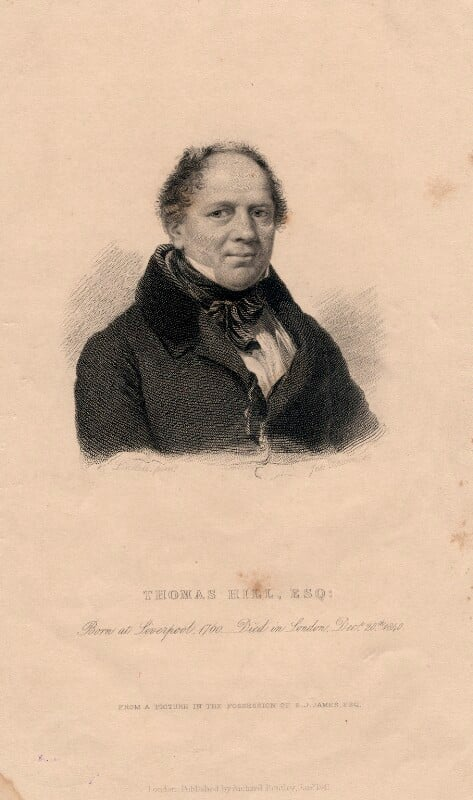
- By Joseph Brown after John Linnell
- Born: May 1760; Lancaster, England
- Died: 20 December 1840 (aged 80); Adelphi, London, England
- Occupation: Book collector

Thomas Hill (May 1760 – 20 December 1840) was an English book collector and bon vivant.

== Biography ==
Hill was born in Lancaster in May 1760, and went at an early age to London, where for many years he carried on an extensive business as a drysalter at Queenhithe. He patronised Robert Bloomfield, whose "Farmer's Boy" he read in manuscript, and recommended to a publisher. Hill was part proprietor of The Monthly Mirror, and befriended Henry Kirke White when a contributor to that periodical. Robert Southey refers to him as "a lover of English literature who possessed one of the most copious collections of English poetry in existence" (Life of Kirke White, i. 14). He had a house in Henrietta Street, Covent Garden, and a cottage at Sydenham, where he used to entertain the Kembles, Theodore Hook, Campbell, Dubois, the Hunts, the two Smiths, Barron Field, and many other literary men. These parties were "the Sydenham Sundays" which Mrs. Mathews "remembered with retrospective gratification" (Memoirs of C. Mathews, iii. 627). About 1810, having lost heavily by an unsuccessful speculation in indigo, he retired to second-floor chambers at 2 James Street, Adelphi, where he lived the rest of his long and merry life. Messrs. Longman gave between 3,000l. and 4,000l. for his books. They form the basis of their "Bibliotheca Anglo-Poetica," 1815, 8vo.

The most life-like picture of Hill is to be found in Hook's "Gilbert Gurney," where he figures as "Hull." The scenes in which he appears were read over to him before publication. He was always thought to be the original of John Poole's "Paul Pry," immortalised by John Liston, although Poole himself insisted that the character was never intended "as the representative of any one individual" (New Monthly Magazine, xxxi. 280). His familiar peculiarities are also represented in the person of "Jack Hobbleday" of Poole's "Little Pedlington." Lockhart called him "the most innocent and ignorant of all the bibliomaniacs." "He had no literary tastes and acquirements; his manners were those of his business" (Cyrus Redding, Fifty Years' Recollections, 1858, ii. 212). But the "jovial bachelor, plump and rosy as an abbot" (Leigh Hunt, Autob. 1850, ii. 17), with his famous "Pooh! pooh! I happen to know," his ceaseless questionings in a harsh, guttural voice, his boastings, his extensive and distorted knowledge of all the gossip of the day, was spoken of by every one as a very kind-hearted and hospitable man. Even at an advanced age he was unusually young-looking; hence the joke of Rogers, that he was one of the little Hills spoken of as skipping in the Psalms, and the assertion of James Smith that the record of his birth had been destroyed in the fire of London.

He died in the Adelphi on 20 December 1840, in his eighty-first year, leaving to Edward Dubois most of his remaining fortune. His furniture and plate were sold by auction on 23 April 1841 (Catalogue, 1841, 8vo). There is an engraving of him, by John Linnell after a miniature, in Bentley's Miscellany, 1841, ix. 89. An excellent portrait, by Daniel Maclise, was given in the "Gallery of Literary Characters" (Fraser's Mag. 1834, x. 172), with a very ingenious imitation of his style of rapid monologue from the pen of Maginn.
