= William Chapman (actor) =

British stage actor

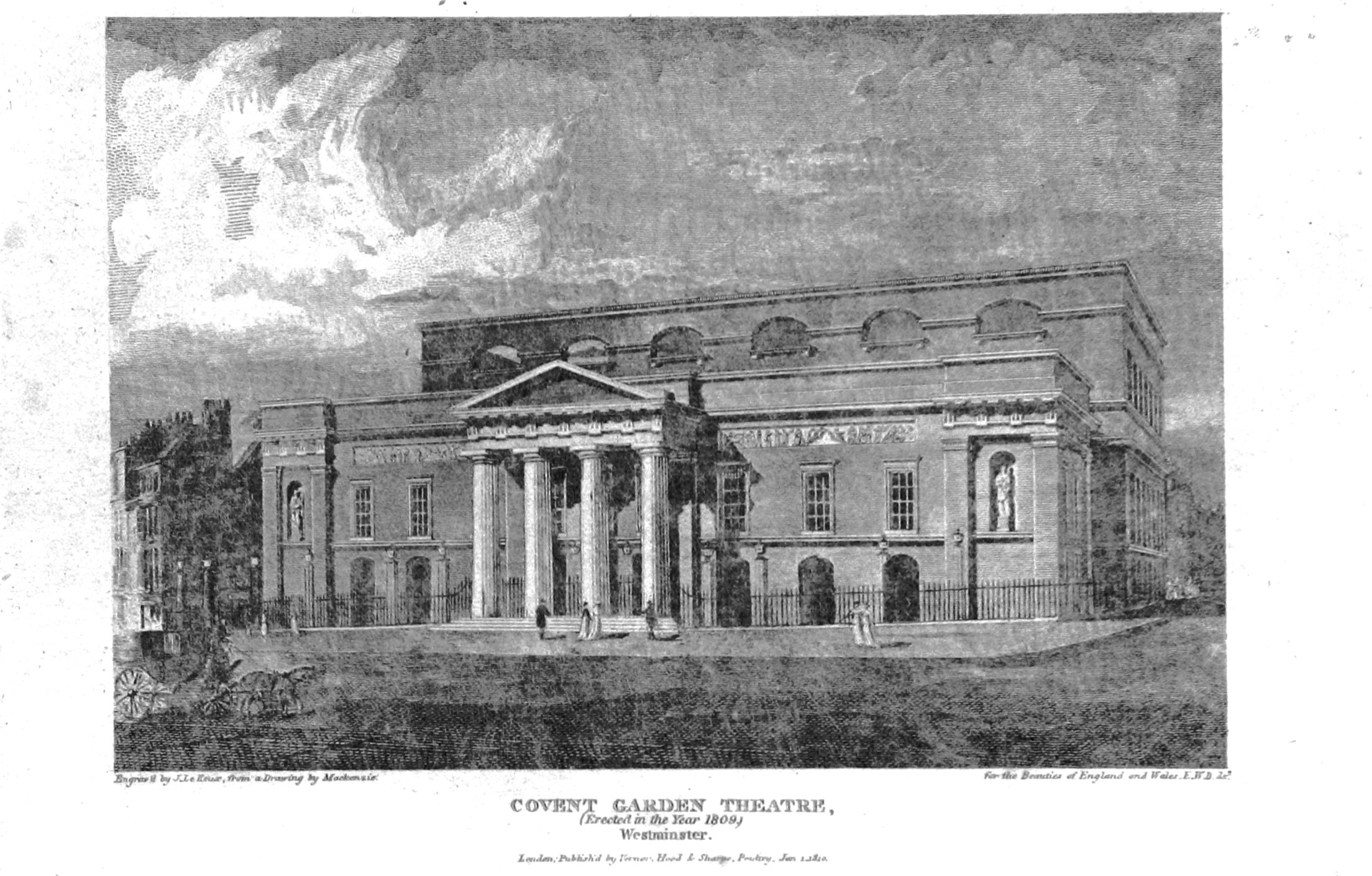
Chapman was a regular at Covent Garden.

William Chapman was a British stage actor active in the late eighteenth century and early nineteenth century. Considerable uncertainly exists about his early biography, but he became an established performer in London's West End at the major theatres Covent Garden, Drury Lane and Haymarket. Considerable crossover may exist with other actors of the era named Chapman.

== Selected roles ==
- Orozembo in Pizarro by Richard Brinsley Sheridan (1800)
- Manly in The Will for the Deed by Thomas Dibdin (1804)
- Mr Balance in Guilty or Not Guilty by Thomas Dibdin (1804)
- Heartly in Who Wants a Guinea? by George Colman the Younger (1805)
- Squire Flail in Five Miles Off by Thomas Dibdin (1806)
- Malcolm in Edgar by George Manners (1806)
- Old Mannerly in Errors Excepted by Thomas Dibdin (1807)
- Trusty in Begone Dull Care by Frederick Reynolds (1808)
- Hammond in Debtor and Creditor by James Kenney (1814)
- Sir Charles Marlow in She Stoops to Conquer by Oliver Goldsmith (1817)
- Renault in Venice Preserved by Thomas Otway (1817)
- Cokaski in Swedish Patriotism by William Abbot (1819)
- Clare in Wallace by Charles Edward Walker (1820)
- Nicias in Damon and Pythias by Richard Lalor Sheil (1821)
- Calvin in Julian by Mary Russell Mitford (1823)
- Maxicazin in Cortez by James Planché (1823)
- Anselmo in The Vespers of Palermo by Felicia Hemans (1823)
- Herman in The Three Strangers by Harriet Lee (1825)

== Bibliography ==
- Highfill, Philip H, Burnim, Kalman A. & Langhans, Edward A. A Biographical Dictionary of Actors, Actresses, Musicians, Dancers, Managers & Other Stage Personnel in London, 1660–1800:. SIU Press, 1982.
