= James Prescott Warde =

English actor (1792–1840)

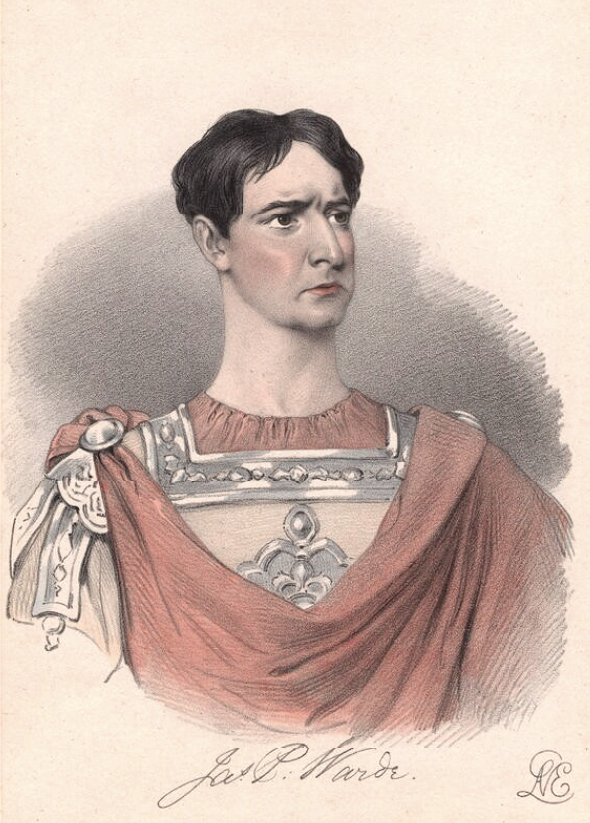
James Prescott Warde, in character as Cassius in Julius Caesar

James Prescott Warde (1792–1840) was an English actor. He came up as a provincial tragic actor, in the Garrick mould. The Dictionary of National Biography says he was "full of promise at the time of his first appearance in London", in 1818, but did not reach the top ranks of the profession.

== Early life ==
Born James Prescott in the west of England in 1792, he was the son of J. Prescott. A cadet at the Royal Military Academy, Woolwich in 1807, he became second lieutenant in the Royal Artillery in 1809. He served for three years in the Cape of Good Hope, then left the army in poor health in 1813, returning to England. He was later superseded for "absence without leave" on 1 April 1815.

Prescott went onto the stage, adopting the further name of Warde. He was first seen in Liverpool, in the role of Lord Towneley in Colley Cibber's The Provoked Husband. He spent time in touring companies in the north of England.

== Bath stage from 1813 ==
Warde's first recorded appearance at Bath, where he settled, was on 28 December 1813 as Achmet in John Brown's tragedy Barbarossa, a part created by Henry Mossop. During 1814 he played at Bath Faulkland in The Rivals (5 March) and Harry Dornton in Thomas Holcroft's The Road to Ruin (17 April); and on 10 December had the title role in Isaac Pocock's John of Paris.’

In 1815 Warde was on 3 January Laertes to the Hamlet of William Macready. Ten days later he took his benefit as Fitzharding in John Tobin's The Curfew. On 1 April he was the original Fitz-James in the dramatic version of Walter Scott's poem The Lady of the Lake. Generally popular, as Dorilas in Aaron Hill's Merope (1 January 1816) Warde was considered to have overdressed the part.

The next year, 1817, Warde was seen as Doricourt in the Belle's Stratagem (1 November), and was considered very good as Biron in David Garrick's Isabella, adapted from Thomas Southerne's The Fatal Marriage. On 15 April 1818 he was seen as Rob Roy, in a Bath premiere, one of his best parts and a box office success. This was the Isaac Pocock adaptation Rob Roy Macgregor, or Auld Lang Syne, an operatic drama in three acts, of the Walter Scott novel.

John William Cole says in his Life of Charles Kean (1859) that Warde and William Augustus Conway each had a dowager as patron in Bath. These ladies sat in opposite stage-boxes, and led the applause for their respective protégés. Conway was certainly backed by Hester Piozzi: the other patron has been identified as Mrs. Vereker, though Piozzi also had time for Warde. There was a rivalry between groups of fans in 1818–9. Another supporter of Warde was Harriet Willoughby, illegitimate daughter of Charles James Fox and the courtesan Elizabeth Bridget Cane. She fell out with Hester Piozzi over the rivalry: they made up in 1820.

== The London stage ==
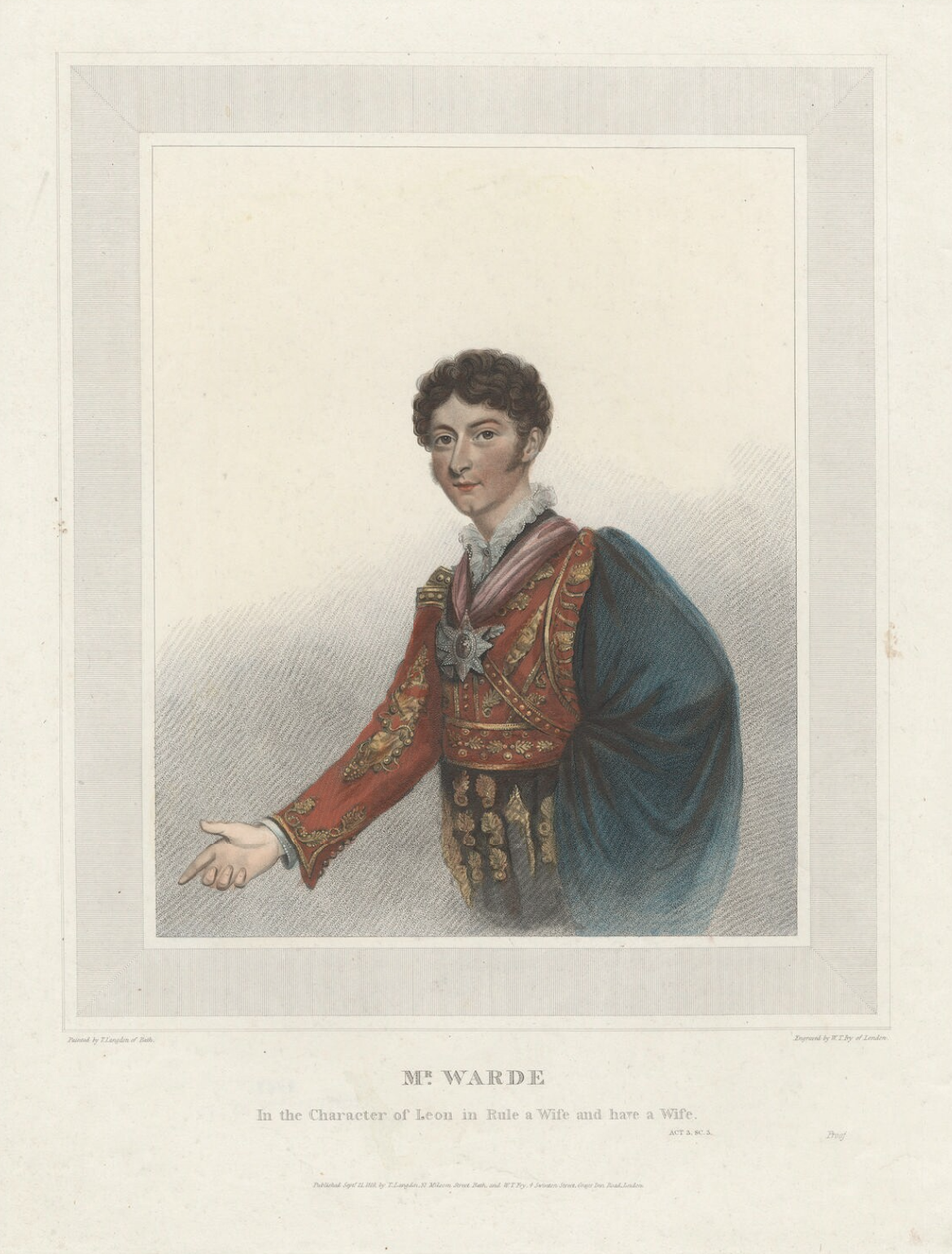
James Prescott Warde as Leon in Rule a Wife and Have a Wife, 1819 engraving

Warde made his first appearance in London at the Haymarket Theatre on 17 July 1818 as Leon in John Fletcher's Rule a Wife and have a Wife: he was well received. It was a choice of part in a mainstream tradition reaching back to Garrick's revival of the play.

Next season Warde opened as Leon (26 July), and was seen as Faulkland, Don Felix in Susanna Centlivre's comedy The Wonder, Valmont in William Dimond's The Foundling of the Forest as his benefit on 28 August, and other parts.

== Hiatus ==
At the end of 1820 Warde moved to Dublin, where he shared the tragic leading roles with Thomas Cobham. He fell ill, recuperated under the care of his wife, and taught elocution for a time. He moved to Birmingham and managed a theatre there, but ran up debts. He did not act in London, was seen again at Bath in 1823, but then not often.

== 1825–1830 ==
Warde reappeared on the London stage in the autumn of 1825, when he was engaged at the Covent Garden Theatre as second lead to Charles Kemble. He created the part of Kruitzner in Harriet Lee's The Three Strangers (10 December). He was no longer a rising star: the London Magazine that year was of the opinion that "Mr. Warde, we think is not fitted to fill the first parts"; though he was adequate to substitute for William Abbot.

In 1826 Warde was Honeywood in a revival of The Good-Natur'd Man by Oliver Goldsmith, to the Croaker of William Farren. On 3 April he played Macbeth for the first time at Covent Garden. In 1827 he was seen as Cassius in Julius Caesar, one of his noted roles. He played the title-part in Henri Quatre for his own benefit on 4 June 1830.

== Later life ==
The plays produced at Covent Garden moved downmarket, and its finances were in confusion. Unable to obtain his salary in 1833, Warde left for the Olympic Theatre, and then went to the Royal Victoria Theatre under the management of William Abbot and Daniel Egerton. But the decline of the older style of "legitimate drama" reduced his opportunities. Engaged at Covent Garden during Macready's brief lesseeship of 1837–8, Warde was only given parts well down the cast list.

Warde's last years were overshadowed by debt: he was often escorted to and from the theatre by bailiffs. He died friendless and in penury, in a lodging in Manchester Street, London on 9 July 1840, at the age of 48.

== Selected roles ==
- Kruitzner in The Three Strangers by Harriet Lee (1825)
- Dubois in The French Libertine by John Howard Payne (1826)
- Count Erizzo in Foscari by Mary Russell Mitford (1826)
- Gonzales in Francis the First by Fanny Kemble (1832)
- Ferrardo in The Wife by James Sheridan Knowles (1833)
- Tancmar in The Provost of Bruges by George William Lovell (1836)
- Norris in The Daughter by James Sheridan Knowles (1836)
- Creon in The Athenian Captive by Thomas Talfourd (1838)
- Baradas in Richelieu by Edward Bulwer-Lytton (1839)
