= Debtor and Creditor (play) =

1814 play

- Original language: English
- Written by: James Kenney
- Genre: Comedy

Premiere
- Date: 20 April 1814
- Place: Theatre Royal, Covent Garden, London

Debtor and Creditor is an 1814 comedy play by the British writer James Kenney. It premiered at the Theatre Royal, Covent Garden in London's West End on 20 April 1814. The original cast included Daniel Terry as Churlton, William Abbot as Etherington, William Blanchard as Average, John Liston as Gosling, John Emery as Sampson Miller, William Chapman as Hammond and Jane Powell as Mrs. Wallis. It marked the final performance on the London stage of Dorothea Jordan who played Barbara.

== Bibliography ==
- Nicoll, Allardyce. A History of Early Nineteenth Century Drama 1800-1850. Cambridge University Press, 1930.
- Tomalin, Claire . Mrs Jordan's Profession: The Story of a Great Actress and a Future King. Penguin, 2003.
- Valladares, Susan. Staging the Peninsular War: English Theatres 1807-1815. Routledge, 2016.
