= Richelieu (play) =

1839 historical play by Edward Bulwer-Lytton

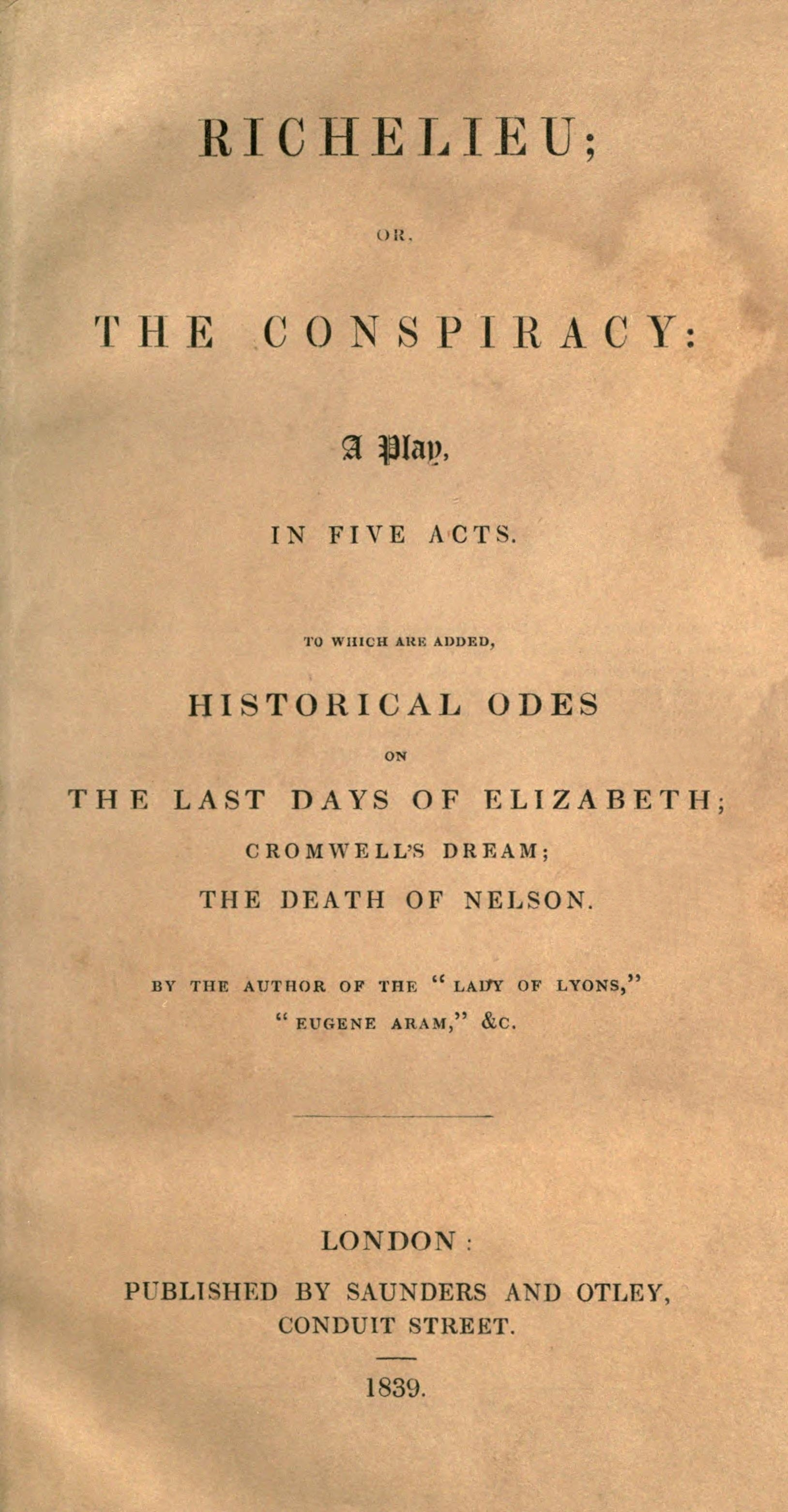
First edition title page

Richelieu; Or the Conspiracy (generally shortened to Richelieu) is an 1839 historical play by the British writer Edward Bulwer-Lytton. It portrays the life of the Seventeenth Century French statesman Cardinal Richelieu. It premiered at the Theatre Royal, Covent Garden on 7 March 1839. The original cast featured William Macready as Richelieu, Edward William Elton as Louis XIII, James Prescott Warde as Baradas, Frederick Vining as Sieur De Beringhen, Samuel Phelps as Joseph, George John Bennett as Huguet, Henry Howe as Francois and Helena Faucit as Julie De Mortemar.

The play has become best known for its line "The pen is mightier than the sword", spoken by the Cardinal in Act II, Scene II.

== Adaptation ==
The play formed the basis of a 1935 American film Cardinal Richelieu directed by Rowland V. Lee and starring George Arliss as Richelieu.

== Bibliography ==
- Nicoll, Allardyce. A History of Early Nineteenth Century Drama 1800-1850. Cambridge University Press, 1930.
- Stanton, Sarah & Banham, Martin. The Cambridge Paperback Guide to Theatre. Cambridge University Press, 1996.
