= The Three Strangers (play) =

1825 play by Harriet Lee

- Original language: English
- Written by: Harriet Lee
- Genre: Melodrama
- Setting: Germany, Present day

Premiere
- Date: 10 December 1825
- Place: Theatre Royal, Covent Garden, London

The Three Strangers is an 1825 stage melodrama by the British writer Harriet Lee. It was based on one of her own works, Kruitzner, co-written as part of The Canterbury Tales with her sister Sophia.

It premiered at the Theatre Royal, Covent Garden on 10 December 1825. The cast included James Prescott Warde as Kruitzner, Daniel Egerton as Baron Stralenheim, Charles Kemble as Conrad, John Cooper as the Hungarian, George Bartley as Idenstein, William Blanchard as the Intendant, William Claremont as Weilberg, William Chapman as Herman, Louisa Chatterley as Josephine and Julia Glover as Mrs Weilberg. A relative disappointment, the play was performed four times and Lee retired after this.

== Bibliography ==
- Burwick, Frederick Goslee, Nancy Moore & Hoeveler Diane Long. The Encyclopedia of Romantic Literature. John Wiley & Sons, 2012.
- Franceschina, John C. Sisters of Gore: Seven Gothic Melodramas by British Women, 1790-1843. Routledge, 2014.
- Nicoll, Allardyce. A History of Early Nineteenth Century Drama 1800-1850. Cambridge University Press, 1930.
