= Swedish Patriotism =

1819 play

- Original language: English
- Written by: William Abbot
- Genre: Melodrama
- Setting: Gotland, 17th century

Premiere
- Date: 19 May 1819
- Place: Theatre Royal, Covent Garden, London

Swedish Patriotism is an 1819 stage melodrama by the British writer and actor William Abbot. It premiered at the Theatre Royal, Covent Garden on 19 May 1819. The London cast included Daniel Terry as Colonel Walstein, Abbot as Captain Albert, Maria Foote as Ulrica, John Liston as Walter, William Chapman as Cokaski, Charles Connor as Colonel Langstorff and Daniel Egerton as Count Cronstedt. It then appeared at the Park Theatre in New York on 1 December 1819 with Robert Maywood as Walstein.

== Synopsis ==
The play is set in Gotland during the reign of Gustavus Adolphus, where Swedish Colonel Walstein leads a patriotic uprising against Danish forces.

== Bibliography ==
- Greene, John C. Theatre in Dublin, 1745-1820: A Calendar of Performances, Volume 6. Lexington Books, 2011.
- Nicoll, Allardyce. A History of Early Nineteenth Century Drama 1800-1850. Cambridge University Press, 1930.
