= A Northern Summer =

1804 travel book by Sir John Carr

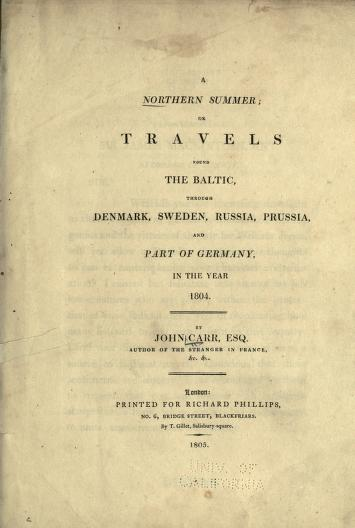
Title page

A Northern Summer; or, Travels Round the Baltic, Through Denmark, Sweden, Russia, Prussia and Part of Germany in the Year 1804 is a travel book by Sir John Carr published in 1805. It details the author’s travels to the northern European countries listed in the book title from May 14 to November 7, 1804.

== Historical context ==
=== Industrial Revolution ===
The ramifications of the early Industrial Revolution affected Carr's approach to local residents in the countries he visited. Britain's economic, technological and military advancements gave him as a British citizen numerical justification, for example naval ships and exports, to feel superior over other countries because of ranking number one in economic and naval terms.

=== Napoleonic Wars ===
==== Military service ====
The reasons behind Carr's exemption from taking part in the Napoleonic Wars remain unclear. The Dictionary of National Biography claims he did not fight in the wars due to lack of health, while Carr himself writes in A Northern Summer that he volunteered for military conscription along with many other men from his hometown in Totnes, however was rejected.

==== Britain's relationship with France ====
Britain's relationship with France, its long-standing enemy was particularly precarious during the Napoleonic Wars. Despite warfare lasting for generations between England and France, the former found itself in constant battle against the latter between 1792 and 1815. The two had considerable military powers comparable to each other, although England undoubtedly gave its priority to its navy. This military hostility became particularly evident in England’s civil society. Resentment against the French army grew exponentially. This explains why English national identity continuously defined itself against the French.

Nevertheless, as the world was becoming more and more French, the British bourgeoisie, too, began to adapt French cultural customs. The increase in English leisurely travel to France brought home realizations of aesthetic, intellectual and cultured French society. Such experiences forced English travelers to reflect on their own cultural society to what lesser extent its own at home had failed to develop, thus creating a need for emulating French cultural practices, such as fashion, etiquette, architecture and high-brow cultural activities. In a way, returning to England, these travelers’ snobbish attitudes could be translated as overcompensation for such lacking cultural society. The military powerhouse of France with its efflorescent cultural society radically transformed as early as the 17th century starkly contrasted England in the midst of its Industrial Revolution, suffering from the effects of its growing yet struggling economy. This idea of cultural and moral “overcompensation” and inner identity conflict is explained more in detail as how “on tour, an Englishman might display his personal superiority before both continentals and other Englishmen despising the best and costliest that Europe could produce: at home, nothing English could compare with what he had seen abroad”. Admittedly, Carr does not travel to France in A Northern Summer and only occasionally makes any reference to France in his writing. However, Britain’s relationship with its most hostile adversary found in France helps clarify to what extent Carr is likely to approach locals of other countries.

=== Early 19th century travel literature ===
Nineteenth century travelling required a high amount of planning. It proved to be extremely costly and posed high risks to the travelers' health, and in some cases, even to their life. These obstacles were often regarded as a challenge to be bested in order to reinvigorate men's sense of masculinity. By approaching travel more as a quest than a danger, British men were in this manner able to strengthen their outward image as an adventurist, pioneer or hero.

The Industrial Revolution helped expand the perimeter of the globe for British entrepreneurs and voyagers. The 19th century is widely considered an age of genuine travel, given its status of going on journeys and not trips. The journey to the destination was of equal value as the destination itself.

=== Relevance ===
This travel book is a singular account of early 19th century travel literature. On the one hand, the most frequent travel writing made during 1804 were soldier diaries, not travel writers' publications. Carr presents an exceptional case of a 19th century traveler in Europe who was not directly involved with the Napoleonic Wars or the British military. Neither was he affiliated with the British Empire's colonialist expansions. Carr traveled for the purpose of traveling.

On the other hand, the most common form of traveling in the 19th century was to destinations typical of the Grand Tour, for example France and Italy. Carr, however, travel north, and not south, to countries unusually visited by British travelers, as he states himself in the book.

== Book content ==
=== Dedication ===
Carr dedicates his book to Sir James Mackintosh in hopes that he will publicly receive it and thus gain his favor in society.

=== Agreement ===
Carr delineates his travel motivations towards his readers in a short prologue titled “The Agreement”. He lists his main motive for his expeditions as documenting the “features which principally distinguish us from our brethren in other regions, and them from each other”. Carr encourages his readers to follow his footsteps and conduct a similar journey to the Baltic countries. In order to facilitate such a subsequent journey, he provides practical information on currency exchanges and post charges.

Carr acknowledges that not many Englishmen have traveled to his desired destinations very often in recent times, and neither have northern European scholars published much on their own nations. He specifically states that he intends not to indulge in any national stereotypes or prejudices. Finally, he warns his readers that he writes from a personal, subjective point of view, without omitting any displeasure entailing to his journeys. If his readers are not content with the way he intends on writing about his travels, he states that he “laments the separation, it will be best for both parties that we should not wander together over another page”.

=== Frequent activities ===
19th century travel demanded certain daily travel necessities, such as finding accommodation, dining in hotels, watering and refreshing horses, exchanging currencies, procuring letters of introduction, buying post stamps, and paying tolls. He also frequently goes for walks around the city visited, and stops at local theaters, schools, and government buildings.

== Reception ==
There is very little information published on either the author or his travel writing. The Dictionary of National Biography states that his publications enjoyed temporary popular success due to its "light, gossipy style". However, his works were equally criticized for lacking "intrinsic merit".

A highlight of his career, Carr was knighted by the Duke of Bedford in 1806 at age 34.

The book is mentioned by Thomas Finlayson Henderson in his article on Sir John Carr in the Dictionary of National Biography (vol. 9, 1887). and also in the Oxford Dictionary of National Biography (revised by Elizabeth Baigent, 2004), where it is said that Carr was knighted, soon after the publication of A Northern Summer and The Stranger in Ireland (1806).
