= Edward Dubois (wit) =

Edward Dubois (4 January 1774 – 1850) was an English wit and man of letters.

== Early life ==
Dubois, son of William Dubois, a merchant in London, whose father was a native of Neufchâtel, was born at Love Lane, in the city of London. Educated at home, he came to know the classics well as having some knowledge of French, Italian, and Spanish.

== Man of letters ==
He adopted literature as his profession, and although he was called to the bar at the Inner Temple, on 5 May 1809, he did not meet with sufficient success to abandon his pen. He was a regular contributor to various periodicals, and especially to the Morning Chronicle under Perry. Art notices, dramatic criticisms, and verses on the topics of the day were his principal contributions; and to the last day of his life he retained his position of art critic on the staff of The Observer. When the Monthly Mirror was the property of the eccentric Thomas Hill, it was edited by Dubois, and on Hill's death he gained financially as one of the two executors and residuary legatees.

Theodore Hook was among his assistants on the Monthly Mirror, and Richard Harris Barham, when writing Hook's life, obtained "many of the most interesting details" of Hook's early history from Dubois. Dubois assisted Thomas Campbell in editing the first number of Henry Colburn's New Monthly Magazine, but before the second number could be issued differences broke out and they separated. For a few years he was the editor of the Lady's Magazine, and for the same period he conducted the European Magazine.

== Relationship with Sir Philip Francis ==
He is sometimes said to have been "a connection" of Sir Philip Francis, at other times his private secretary, and they were certainly on intimate terms of friendship from 1807 until Francis's death in 1818. If Francis had gone out as governor of Buenos Aires in 1807, Dubois would have accompanied him as private secretary. He compiled Francis's biography in the Monthly Mirror for 1810, and wrote the life of Francis which appeared in the Morning Chronicle for 28 December 1818. When Lord Campbell was composing his Memoir of Lord Loughborough, Dubois obtained for him a long memorandum from Lady Francis on the authorship of the Letters of Junius.

The first of these lives is said to have prompted the publication of John Taylor's Junius Identified, and it has more than once been insinuated that Dubois was the real author of that volume. Considerable correspondence and articles on the general subject of the Letters of Junius and on Taylor's work appeared in the Athenaeum and Notes and Queries for 1850 (some of which will be found in Charles Wentworth Dilke's Papers of a Critic, vol. ii.), but the connection of Dubois with the authorship of Junius Identified was set at rest by the assurance of Taylor (Notes and Queries, 1850, pp. 258–9) that he 'never received the slightest assistance from Mr. Dubois.'a

== Later life ==
For many years, at least twenty years, Dubois was assistant to Serjeant Heath, judge of the court of requests, a 'strange and whimsical court,’ as it has been designated.

When county courts were established a judgeship was offered to Dubois, but he preferred to continue as Heath's deputy. In 1833 he was appointed by Lord Brougham to the office of treasurer and secretary of the Metropolitan Lunacy Commission, and on the abolition of that body in 1845 was employed under the new commission without any special duties. These appointments he retained until his death, and their duties were discharged by him with success; for although he loved a joke, even in court, he never allowed this propensity to get the mastery over his natural astuteness. His face was naturally droll, his wit was caustic, and he was 'capital at the dinner table.'

He died at Sloane Street, Chelsea, on 10 January 1850, aged 76. One of his last acts was to raise a subscription for the family of Richard Brinsley Peake, the dramatist.

== Works ==
Dubois's works were of an ephemeral character, and appeared when he was a young man.

- A Piece of Family Biography, dedicated to George Colman, 3 vols., 1799.
- The Wreath (1799); these were selections from Sappho, Theocritus, Bion, and Moschus, with prose translation and notes. There were remarks on Shakespeare, and a comparison between Horace and Lucian. In this compilation he was assisted by Capel Lofft. The remarks on Shakespeare chiefly show coincidences and imitations between his works and those of the ancient classics.
- The Fairy of Misfortune, or the Loves of Octar and Zuleima, an Italian Tale translated from the French, by the author of "A Piece of Family Biography", 1799. The original work, Mirza and Fatimé, was published at The Hague in 1754.
- St. Godwin; a Tale of the 16th, 17th, and 18th Century, by Count Reginald de St. Leon, 1800. A skit on William Godwin's novel St. Leon.
- Old Nick; a Satirical Story in Three Volumes, 1801; 2nd ed. 1803. Dedicated to Thomas Hill.
- The Decameron, with remarks on the Life and Writings of Boccaccio, and an Advertisement by the Author of "Old Nick", 1804. The translation, which was suggested by Thomas Hill, was a revision of one issued anonymously in 1741.
- Rhymes (1805); anonymous, by Octavius Graham Gilchrist of Stamford, and edited by Dubois.
- Poetical Translations of the Works of Horace (1807), edition of the work by Philip Francis, with additional notes by Dubois, 4 vols. Dubois was assisted by Capel Lofft, Stephen Weston, and Sir Philip Francis.
- When the travels of Sir John Carr were attracting attention, Dubois undertook, for the publishers of the 'Monthly Mirror,’ to write a satirical pamphlet on Carr's writing. It was called My Pocket-book, or Hints for a "Ryghte merrie and conceitede tour, in quarto; to be called, 'The Stranger in Ireland,’ in 1805. By a Knight Errant", 1807. This satire quickly passed through two editions, and was followed by 'Old Nick's Pocket-book,’ 1808, written in ridicule of Dubois, by a friend of Carr, who was stung into bringing an action against Hood and Sharpe. The case came before Lord Ellenborough and a special jury, at Guildhall, 1 August 1808, when the judge summed up in favour of the defendants, and the verdict was given for them. Two reports of the trial were issued, one on behalf of the plaintiff and the other in the interest of the defendants; the latter report was appended to a third edition of My Pocket-book.
- The Rising Sun.
- The Tarantula, or the Dance of Fools; by the Author of "The Rising Sun", (1809). A satire on fashionable life in 1809, which is sometimes attributed to Dubois.
- Facetiæ, Musarum Deliciæ, or the Muses' Recreation, by Sir J. M. [Mennis] and Ja. S. [James Smith] … with Memoirs [by Dubois] of Sir John Mennis and Dr. James Smith, 1817, 2 vols.

Dubois also edited Harris's Hermes (6th edit. 1806); Fitzosborne's Letters, by Melmoth (11th edit. 1805); Burton's Anatomy (1821); Hayley's Ballads, with plates by William Blake (1805); and Ossian's Poems (1806).

== Family ==
He married at Bloomsbury Church in August 1815 Harriet Cresswell, daughter of Richard Cheslyn Cresswell, registrar of the Arches Court of Canterbury. By her, who survived him, he had three sons, and one daughter.
