= Paul Pry (play) =

- Written by: John Poole
- Characters: Paul Pry
- Original language: English
- Genre: Farce

Premiere
- Date premiered: 13 September 1825
- Place premiered: Haymarket Theatre

Paul Pry (1825), a farce in three acts, was the most notable play written by 19th-century English playwright John Poole. It premiered in London on 13 September 1825 at the Haymarket Theatre and ran 114 performances. The play continued to be popular until the early 1870s.

== Synopsis ==
The storyline is centered on a comical, idle, meddlesome and mischievous fellow consumed with curiosity. Unable to mind his own business, he's an interfering busybody who conveniently leaves behind an umbrella everywhere he goes in order to have an excuse to return and eavesdrop. At the end, however, Pry becomes a hero for rescuing papers from a well that incriminate more serious troublemakers. Cherry Ripe, the 17th-century English folk song to words by the English poet Robert Herrick, is adapted into the play.

== Analysis ==
Rumors abounded that the Pry character was based on the eccentric Thomas ("Tommy") Hill, editor of the Dramatic Mirror, who took daily walks with Poole at Kensington Gardens. However, Poole was quoted in magazines as saying,

"The idea was really suggested by an old invalid lady who lived in a very narrow street, and who amused herself by speculating on the neighbors, and identifying them, as it were, by the sound of the knocks they gave... It was not drawn from an individual, but from a class. I could mention five or six persons who were contributors to the original play."

== Productions ==
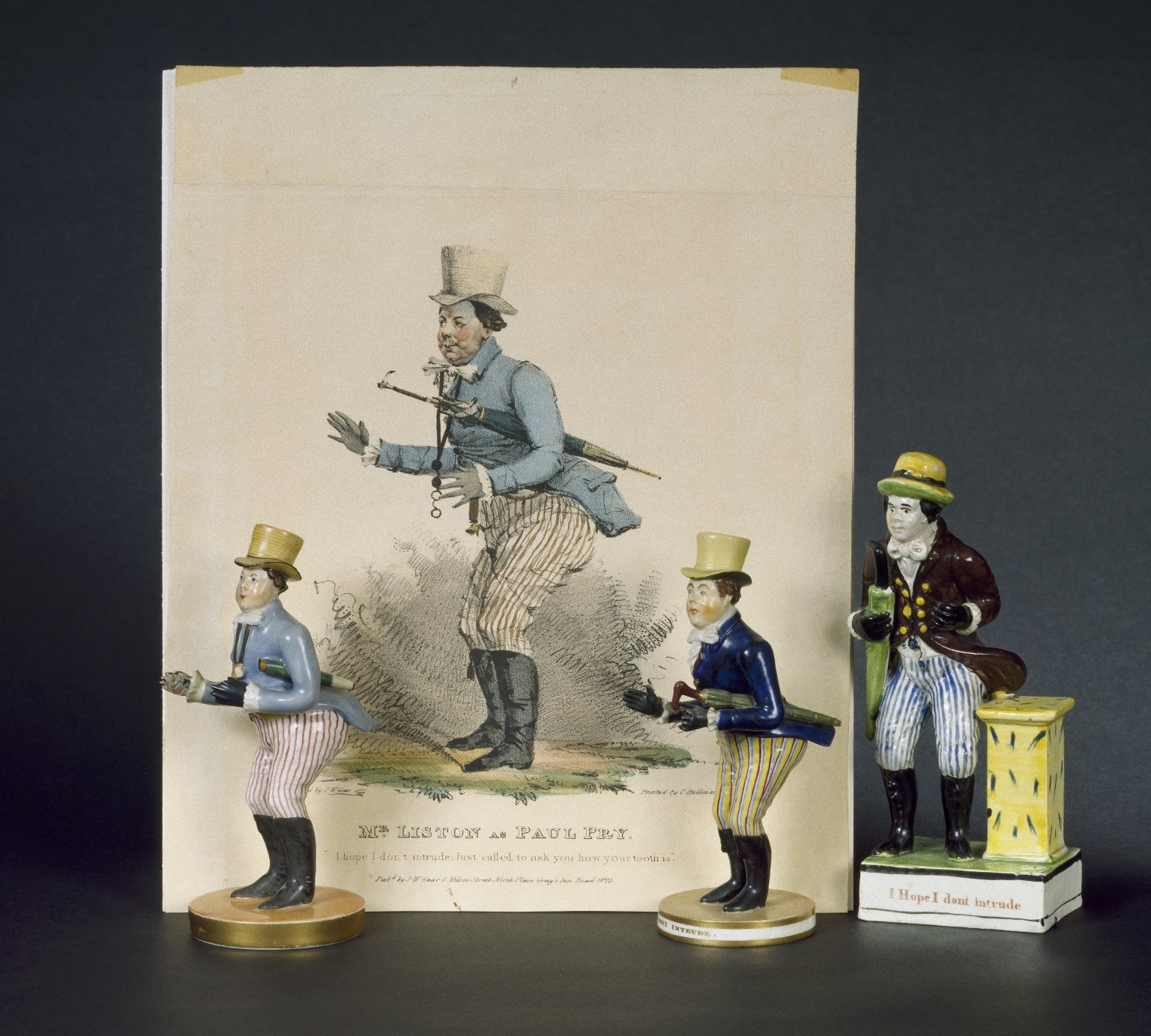
John Liston as Paul Pry, circa 1825, from the collection of the Folger Shakespeare Library

In the original 1825 London production, Madame Vestris sang "Cherry Ripe", and John Liston portrayed the title character. His costume included striped pants, Hessian boots, top hat, and tailcoat. Liston's portrayal was so popular that images of Liston as Pry appeared on signs, shops, warehouses, handkerchiefs, and snuff boxes. Porcelain and pearlware factories in Staffordshire, Rockingham, Derby and Worcestershire produced figurines of Liston as Pry. The Liston as Pry image was even stamped on butter.

The following year, in 1826, the play was produced in New York City at the Park Theatre, featuring Thomas Hilson. It was first produced in Australia in October 1835 at the Theatre Royal in Sydney, when Joseph Simmons took the title role.

It returned to London's Adelphi Theatre, for the 1851–52 season, featuring Edward Richard Wright and Sarah Woolgar, receiving extensive, positive press comment.

An extant Victorian pub in Worcester, England, is named after the title character.
