= The Maidens' Consent =

The Maidens' Consent (Spanish: El sí de las niñas [el ˈsi ðe las ˈniɲas]) is a play by the Spanish playwright Leandro Fernández de Moratín. It was written in 1801 and first performed in 1806. The play is a satirical commentary on Spanish social norms of the time and has since become part of the repertoire. 37,000 people saw the play performed during the 26 days it ran at Madrid's Teatro de la Cruz, a figure equivalent to around 25% of the population of the Spanish capital during the period.

== Plot summary ==
=== Act 1 ===
A rich, elderly, bachelor (Diego) from Madrid and his servant, Simón, have traveled to the city of Guadalajara to escort a poor 16-year-old girl (Francisca) and her mother back to the capital. They stop in the town of Alcalá de Henares to stay for the night. While there, Diego tells Simón that he is engaged to Francisca. He has never met the girl before, but her mother, Irene, has assured him, mostly through letters, that the girl is delighted to be marrying him. Diego has been looking for a wife with whom he can share friendship and mutual respect; he says that impassioned love is too emotional to be well thought out. But, he is attracted to Francisca's youth and innocence, and plans to marry her as soon as they arrive in Madrid the next morning. This certainly heats up the affair situation. He doesn't want anyone to know about it until the marriage is finalized, because he isn't sure how his friends and relatives will view his marrying such a young girl. Simón is dubious, but Diego pays him no mind. However, he expresses concern over the fact that Francisca never says she loves him and has never explicitly consented to the marriage. Irene assures him that it would be improper for a girl to express such feelings in front of a man, and that Francisca tells Irene all the time about how wonderful Diego is.

A servant named Calamocha arrives at the house (which also rents rooms to travelers) to tell Rita, Francisca's servant, that he and his master have ridden all the way from Zaragoza to stop the wedding. He exits as Rita goes to tell Francisca the good news.

Later, Francisca, almost in sobs, expresses to Rita her displeasure at the prospect of marrying Don Diego. It is revealed that Francisca has fallen in love over the summer with a young man named Félix, in spite of living in a convent with her aunt. However, Francisca fears that, in her absence, Félix is already involved with other lovers and will ignore the letter that she sent him. Finally, Rita tells her that Félix has already come to Alcalá to help her, and Francisca immediately feels better.

=== Act 2 ===
While they wait for Félix, Irene has a talk with Francisca about why she should be happy to get married: Diego is very rich, and Irene doesn't have anyone to take care of her except for Francisca. Also, Irene herself has married older men three different times and it has always worked out, so Francisca shouldn't have anything to worry about. She even goes so far as to threaten Francisca, who starts to feel that she cannot disobey her mother.

Félix then arrives and tells Paquita (a diminutive of Francisca) that she has nothing to worry about, because he has a rich uncle in Madrid that will use his money and influence to stop the marriage and allow Paquita to marry Félix. She starts to cry because she feels so torn between her filial duties and her great love for Félix.

Francisca and Rita must go to Irene's room, and Simón and Calamocha enter separately. They recognize each other and ask why each has come to Alcalá. However, Calamocha cannot reveal that Félix has come for personal reasons, and Simón has been charged to keep the wedding a secret, so each man pretends not to understand the other's questions. They stall until Diego shows up.

It is then revealed that "Félix" is actually don Carlos, the nephew of don Diego who has been stationed with his regiment in Zaragoza. Carlos says that he was on his way to Madrid so that he could visit his uncle. Diego is suspicious of this reason and orders Carlos to go back to Zaragoza immediately. Carlos protests that the horses are too tired, so Diego, still trying to hide the fact that he is engaged, sends Carlos somewhere else to spend the night. As Diego is like a father to him, Carlos cannot disobey, so he and Calamocha leave without an opportunity to explain to Francisca what is going on.

=== Act 3 ===
In the middle of the night, Carlos plays music in the street so that Francisca will hear him, and he throws a letter for her through the window. However, Diego finds it, having already witnessed the entire episode. He sends Simón to get Carlos while he finally talks to Francisca about the marriage. Francisca, heartbroken, says that she'll do as her mother orders, even though she will be unhappy.

When Carlos arrives, Diego deliberately provokes him to see how much he cares for Francisca. Carlos proves that theirs is not an illicit love, but rather they have spent 90 days just talking to one another and have thus fallen in love. However, Carlos offers to abandon Francisca if that is what his uncle would command. Diego realizes that he has been as commandeering to Carlos as Irene has been to Francisca, for which Diego has already criticized her. Finally, Diego decides that it would be better for Francisca to have free choice of what she wants to do, and she decides to marry Carlos.

== Interpretation ==
=== Social criticism ===
Diego's behavior is an example of poder ilustrado, ("enlightened power"), a kind of powerful man who factors reason and logic into his decision-making process. All of the characters demonstrate a high sense of decorum, as befits a neoclassical work. On many occasions a character seems about to get angry but always calms him/herself down so as not to be ruled by chaotic emotions.

The play is occasionally criticized as being somewhat misogynistic in that the women of the story sometimes trick the male characters, and are examples of old regime, non-enlightened characters. However, the male characters trick others also, such as when Calamocha and Simón are attempting to conceal their own purposes for having come to Alcalá, or when Diego pretends that he doesn't know about the relationship between Francisca and Carlos in order to find out how she really feels.

By contemporary standards, this would never be considered a feminist work. However, Moratín was commenting on the social institutions of his own day in Spain, compared to which his ideas are positively enlightened. Commonly, a girl's parents would either find a husband for her or make her become a nun. Females were taught to obey and always be silent, which is exactly what Francisca does. Moratín criticizes this through Diego, who becomes frustrated by the elliptical conversations he has to have with Francisca because she cannot say what she truly feels. Also, by having the happy ending be that Francisca gets to choose her husband, Moratín advocates free choice for women, which was a fairly radical viewpoint for his time.

=== Symbolism ===
Light and darkness have a strong presence in the play. Light is often associated with Carlos/Félix, representing the passionate love that he has for Paquita. Rita is often the bearer of lights, both because that is the realistic job of a servant and also because she usually knows the true nature of different situations.

All of the servants are the voices of reason throughout the play. They calm their masters down and help them to decipher the truth through all the mistaken situations and identities. Although everyone (except Irene) maintains their decorum at all times, the servants help them maintain inner stability as well.

Moratín criticizes some women of the upper classes through Irene. She is irritatingly needy and selfish and complains constantly. She tries to manipulate both Francisca and Diego in order to make her own life more comfortable.
