= Cortez (play) =

1823 play

- Original language: English
- Written by: James Planché
- Genre: Historical Extravaganza
- Setting: Mexico, 16th century

Premiere
- Date: 5 November 1823
- Place: Theatre Royal, Covent Garden, London

Cortez: Or, The Conquest of Mexico is an 1823 historical extravaganza by the British writer James Planché with music composed by Henry Bishop. It premiered at the Theatre Royal, Covent Garden on 5 November 1823. The original cast included John Cooper as Herdinando Cortez, Mary Ann Paton as Amazitli, Thomas Comer as Velaszque de Leon, William Chapman as Maxicazin, William Claremont as Tentile, George John Bennett as Teluxo, and Thomas Cooke as Oxoctzin. It also featured thirteen horses on stage and the trick rider Andrew Ducrow. The libretto by Planché is inspired by the Spanish conquest of Mexico under Hernán Cortés, and it enjoyed great success.

== Bibliography ==
- Dawson, Frank Griffith. The First Latin American Debt Crisis: The City of London and the 1822-25 Loan Bubble. Yale University Press, 1990.
- Hudston, Sara. Victorian Theatricals. A&C Black, 2014.
- Nicoll, Allardyce. A History of Early Nineteenth Century Drama 1800-1850. Cambridge University Press, 1930.
- Price, Chris. The Canterbury Catch Club 1826: Music in the Frame. Cambridge Scholars Publishing, 2018.
