= The French Libertine =

1826 play

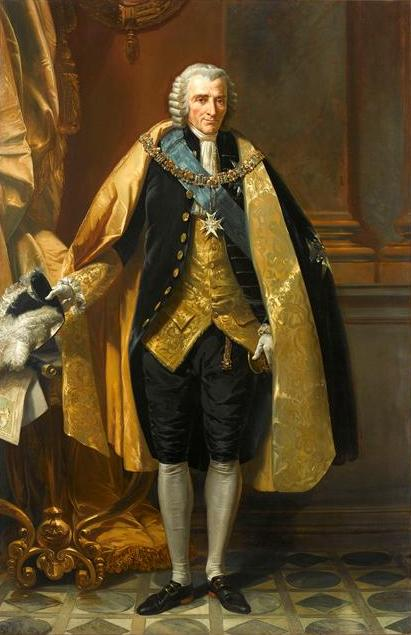
- Richelieu, the inspiration for the play.
- Original language: English
- Written by: John Howard Payne
- Genre: Historical
- Setting: Paris, 18th century

Premiere
- Date: 11 February 1826
- Place: Theatre Royal, Covent Garden, London

The French Libertine is an 1826 historical play by the British-based American writer John Howard Payne. Written under the title Richelieu the play originally focused on the life of the eighteenth century French aristocrat and libertine the Duke of Richelieu, a relation of the seventeenth century statesman Cardinal Richelieu. It was partly inspired by the 1796 work La Jeunesse de Richelieu by Alexandre Duval. Issues with the censor George Colman led to many changes, done by Charles Kemble who played the lead, and Richelieu was altered into the fictional Duke de Rougemont.

It premiered at the Theatre Royal, Covent Garden in London on 11 February 1826. The cast included Charles Kemble as the Duke de Rougemont, James Prescott Warde as Dubois, Tyrone Power as Lamotte, John Cooper as Dorival, Louisa Chatterley as Countess de Fleury and Julia Glover as Jeanette.

== Bibliography ==
- Class, Monika & Robinson, Terry F. Transnational England: Home and Abroad, 1780–1860. Cambridge Scholars Publishing, 2009.
- Genest, John. Some Account of the English Stage: From the Restoration in 1660 to 1830, Volume 9. H.E. Carrington, 1832.
- Nicoll, Allardyce. A History of Early Nineteenth Century Drama 1800–1850. Cambridge University Press, 1930.
