= Sarah Liston =

Scottish actress and singer (1781–1854)

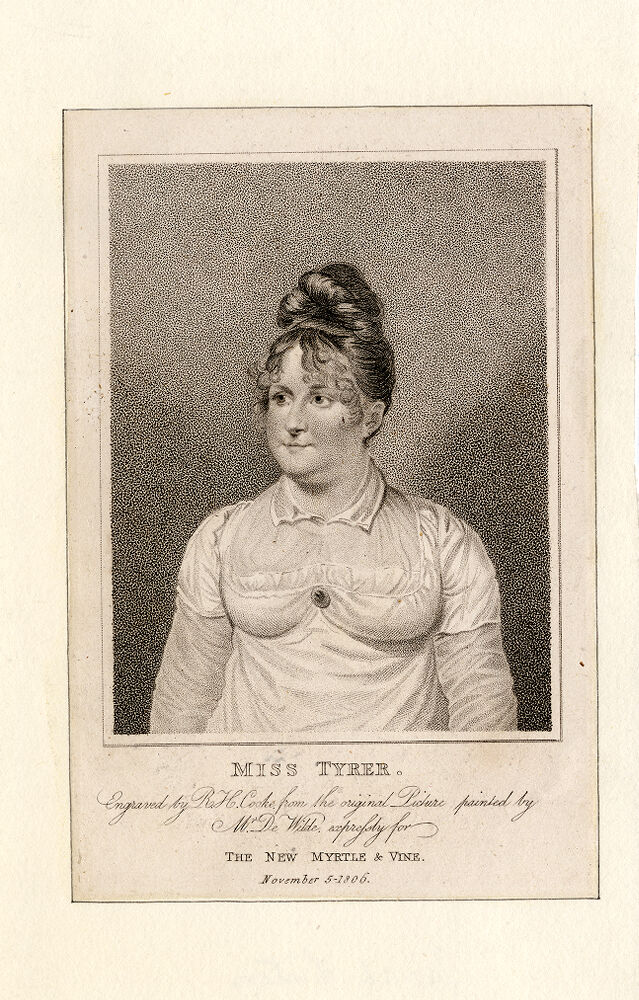
- Liston in 1806
- Born: Sarah Tyrer; 1781
- Died: 1854 (aged 72 or 73)

Sarah Liston (née Tyrer; 1781–1854) was a Scottish actress and singer.

== Biography ==
Sarah Liston was the wife of comedian John Liston and they had two children. Liston died in 1854 at Alexander Square Brompton, Middlesex.

== Productions ==
- Five Miles Off
- Errors Excepted
- The Foundling of the Forest

== See also ==
- List of Scottish actors
