= John Carr (travel writer) =

British lawyer and writer

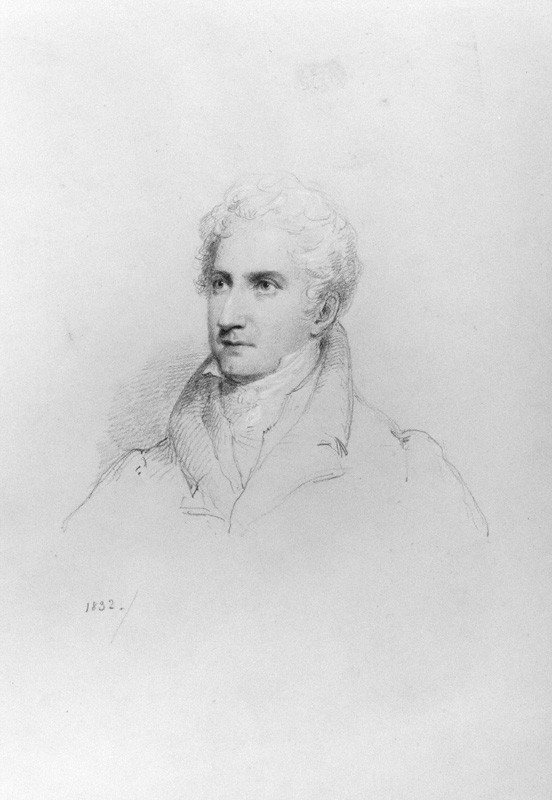
Sir John Carr, 1832 drawing by William Brockedon

Sir John Carr (1772–1832) was an English barrister and travel writer.

== Life ==
Carr, from Devonshire, was called to the bar at the Middle Temple, but for health reasons began to travel. Accounts of his journeys around Europe were popular for their light style.

Shortly after the publication of The Stranger in Ireland (1806), Carr was knighted by John Russell, 6th Duke of Bedford, then Lord Lieutenant of Ireland. In 1807 his Tour in Ireland was made the subject of a spoof by Edward Dubois, entitled My Pocket Book, or Hints for a Ryghte Merrie and Conceited Tour. The publishers were prosecuted in 1809, but Carr was nonsuited. Lord Byron met Carr at Cádiz, and referred to him in some suppressed stanzas of Childe Harold as "Green Erin's knight and Europe's wandering star".

Carr died in New Norfolk Street, London, on 17 July 1832.

== Works ==
In 1803 Carr published The Stranger in France, a Tour from Devonshire to Paris, an immediate success. It was followed in 1805 by A Northern Summer: or, Travels round the Baltic, through Denmark, Sweden, Russia, Prussia and Part of Germany In The Year 1804; in 1806 by The Stranger in Ireland, or a Tour in the Southern and Western parts of that country in 1805, and in 1807 by A Tour through Holland, along the right and left banks of the Rhine, to the south of Germany, in 1806.

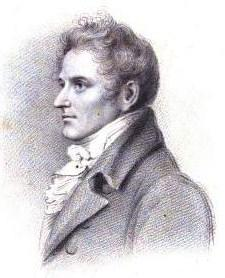
Sir John Carr, 1809 engraving

In 1808 there appeared Caledonian Sketches, or a Tour through Scotland in 1807, reviewed by Sir Walter Scott in the Quarterly Review; and in 1811 Descriptive Travels in the Southern and Eastern parts of Spain and the Balearic Isles in the year 1809. Carr was also the author of:

- The Fury of Discord, a poem, 1803;
- The Seaside Hero, a drama in three acts, 1804 (about an anticipated invasion, scene set on the coast of Sussex); and
- Poems, 1809.

== Notes ==
Attribution

This article incorporates text from a publication now in the public domain: Stephen, Leslie, ed. (1887). "Carr, John (1772-1832)". Dictionary of National Biography. Vol. 9. London: Smith, Elder & Co.
