= Thomas Cobham (actor) =

British actor

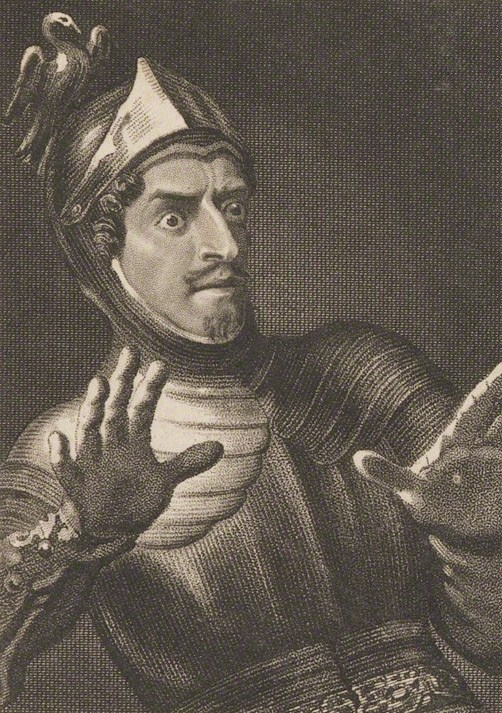
Thomas Cobham, in character as Lord Marmion

Thomas Cobham (1786–1842) was a British actor.

== Early life ==
Cobham was born in 1786 in London. His father died young, and was apprenticed by his mother to Joseph Aspin the printer, a cousin. He became a reader and corrector for the press, and came into contact with Edmond Malone.

Cobham first appeared as an amateur in Lamb's Conduit Street as Shylock. His first professional role was at Watford, Hertfordshire. He subsequently played in country towns, taking every part from leading tragedian to harlequin. At Salisbury he married Miss Drake, an actress of the Salisbury Theatre.

When playing at Oxford, Cobham, with his wife, was engaged by Sampson Penley for the theatre in Tottenham Street, where he appeared with much success as the eponymous Marmion in a dramatisation by William Oxberry of Scott's poem. He then went to the Surrey Theatre, and from there to the Royalty. He attracted the soubriquet "'the Kemble of the minor theatres".

== Leading actor ==
On 16 April 1816 Cobham appeared as Richard III at Covent Garden. That the experiment was a failure was in part ascribed to the supporters of Charles Kean, and especially to the club of his supporters known as 'The Wolves.' William Hazlitt, however, who was present on the occasion, declares his Richard to have been 'a vile one,' a caricature of Kean, and continues :

He raved, whined, grinned, stared, stamped, and rolled his eyes with incredible velocity, and all in the right place according to his cue, but in so extravagant and disjointed a manner, and with such a total want of common sense, decorum, or conception of the character as to be perfectly ridiculous.

The 'Theatrical Inquisitor' (April 1816), on the other hand, says of his performance that 'it was good very good,' and censures the audience for taking a cowardly advantage and condemning him before he was heard. The performance was repeated with some success on 22 April 1816, and Cobham then disappeared from the West-end.

In 1817, Cobham appeared at the Crow Street Theatre, Dublin, as Sir Giles Overreach, playing afterwards Macbeth, and Richard. He was in Dublin in 1821–2, a member of the Hawkins Street stock company, dividing with James Prescott Warde the principal characters of tragedy. After Warde dropped out, he played, in the memorable engagement of Kean in July 1822, Richmond, Iago, Edgar in Lear, and the Ghost in Hamlet.

== Reputation and rivalry ==
Early in his career Cobham played at Woolwich, at the Navy Tavern, Glenalvon to the Young Norval of Kean. Subsequently, at the Coburg Theatre the two actors met once more, Kean playing Othello, and Cobham Iago. The reception of Kean on this occasion by the public, south of the Thames, was unfavourable. A full account of the scene of Kean's indignation and Cobham's speech to the audience appears in John William Cole's Life of Charles Kean, i. 161–3.

Cobham had some resemblance in appearance and stature to Kean, being dark, with flexible features, and about five feet five inches in height. In spite of Hazlitt's unfavourable verdict, he was a fair actor, a little given to rant, and to so-called and not very defensible 'new readings.' In the 'Dramatic Magazine,' ii. 210, he is placed in respect of genius above all actors of the day except Kean, Young, Macready, and Charles Kemble.

It is there also said that 'the modern stage affords few efforts of genius superior to his acting in the last scene of "Thirty Years of a Gambler's Life."' A coloured print of Cobham as Richard III was published in Dublin, presumably in 1821.

== Later life ==
In his later years, Cobham concentrated on the London theatres south of the. He appeared as Parker in Douglas Jerrold's The Mutiny at the Nore in 1830 at the Pavilion Theatre about the 1797 Navy mutinies. He died on 3 January 1842, leaving a son, and a daughter who acted under the name of Mrs. Fitzgerald.
