= The Athenian Captive =

1838 play

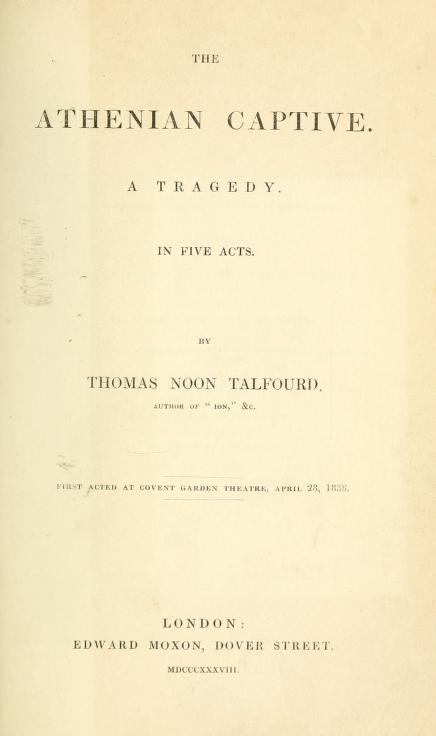
- Original language: English
- Written by: Thomas Talfourd
- Genre: Tragedy
- Setting: Corinth, Ancient Greece

Premiere
- Date: 4 August 1838
- Place: Theatre Royal, Haymarket, London

The Athenian Captive is an 1838 tragedy by the British writer Thomas Talfourd. It was originally intended to be performed at Covent Garden in London but after rehearsals the illness of one of the actresses forced delays. This led him to take it instead to the Theatre Royal, Haymarket where it premiered on 4 August 1838. The Haymarket cast was led by William Macready as Thoas and Mary Warner as Ismene, and the production enjoyed success. Other cast members included James Prescott Warde as Creon, Henry Howe as Lycus and Helena Faucit as Creusa. Talfourd dedicated the play to Lord Denman, the Lord Chief Justice.

== Bibliography ==
- Macqueen-Pope, Walter. Haymarket: Theatre of Perfection. W.H. Allen, 1948.
- Nicoll, Allardyce. A History of Early Nineteenth Century Drama 1800-1850. Cambridge University Press, 1930.
