= Thomas Hilson =

American actor

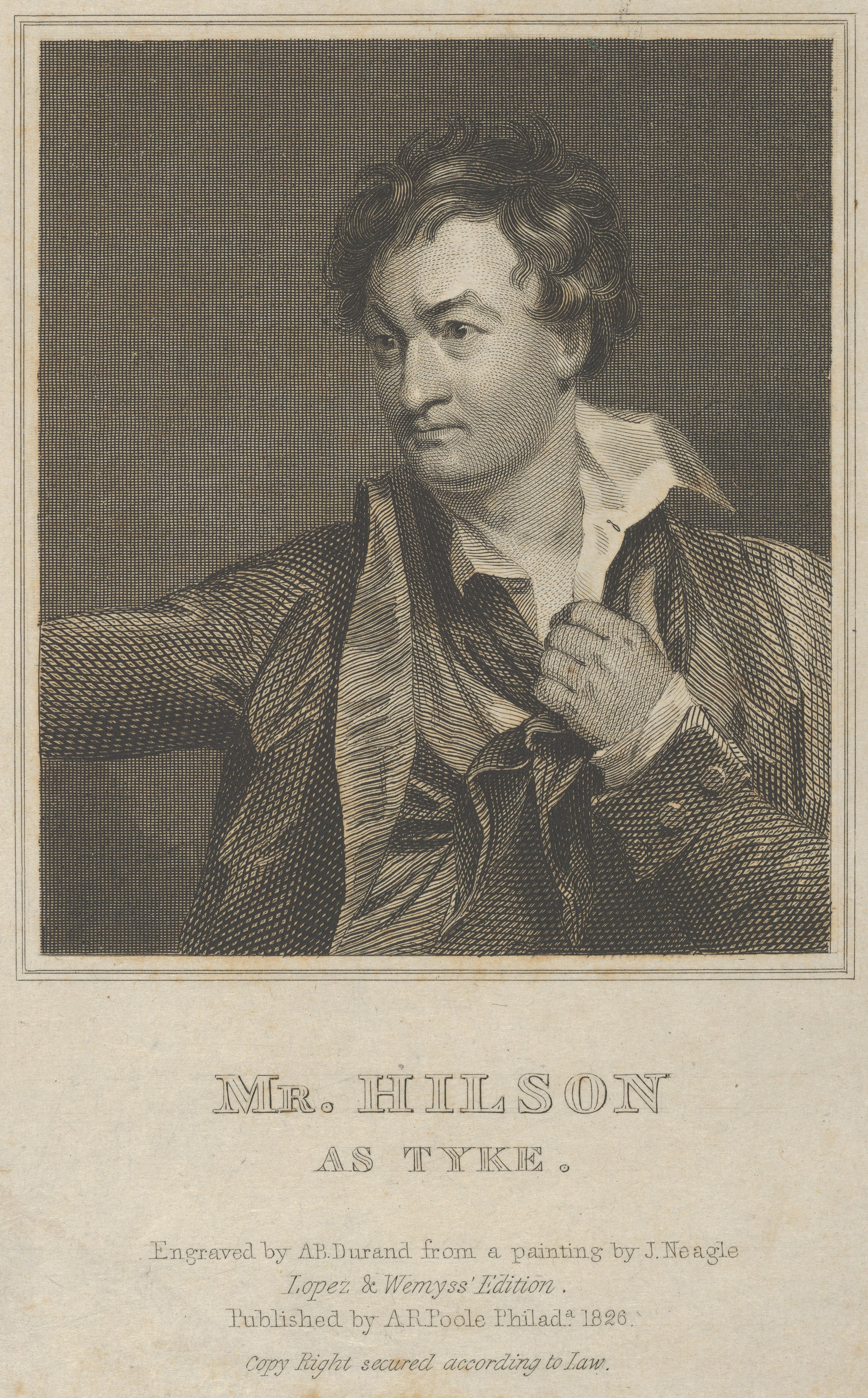
- 1826 print of Hilson in the role of Tyke in The School of Reform, or How to Rule a Husband (1805) by Thomas Morton
- Born: 1784; England
- Died: July 23, 1834 (aged 49–50); Louisville, Kentucky
- Occupation: Actor
- Spouse: Ellen Augusta Johnson (1801-1837)

Thomas Hilson (1784-July 23, 1834) was an American comedian and actor.

Born in England with the surname Hill, he first appeared on stage in the United States in 1811 at the Park Theatre in New York playing Walter in The Children of the Wood. He quickly became a popular performer at the Park, and pleased audiences in comedic roles ranging from Shakespeare to new productions such as Paul Pry (1825), though he also did well in non-comedic roles. He continued at the theater, with brief interruptions, until 1833. Charles Francis Adams Sr. (son and grandson of the Adams' presidents) mentions, on July 5, 1826, attending the Park Theatre and seeing "Hilson in the amusing character of Paul Pry and enjoyed a very hearty laugh."

He married actress Ellen Augusta Johnson (1801-1837) in 1825. Sometimes they appeared on stage together.

Hison died in Louisville, Kentucky on July 23, 1834 of apoplexy. Upon his death he was said to be "long known in various parts of the United States as one of the best Comedians of the day."

According to an 1837 profile of Park Theatre manager Edmund Simpson, Simpson had connections with Hilson back to when both were in theatre in England. After Hilson's widow died, Simpson adopted their young daughter Maria.
