= Five Miles Off =

1806 play by Thomas Dibdin

- Original language: English
- Written by: Thomas John Dibdin
- Genre: Comedy
- Setting: England, present day

Premiere
- Date: 9 July 1806
- Place: Theatre Royal, Haymarket, London

Five Miles Off is an 1806 comedy play by the British writer Thomas Dibdin. It premiered at the Theatre Royal, Haymarket in London on 9 July 1806. The original cast included William Chapman as Squire Flail, John Fawcett as Kalendar, Vincent De Camp as Luckless, Charles Mathews as Spriggins, John Liston as Flourish, Jane Powell as Mrs Prue, Sarah Liston as Laura Luckless, and Maria Gibbs as Jenny. Its Irish premiere took place at the Crow Street Theatre in Dublin on 2 August 1816

== Bibliography ==
- Greene, John C. Theatre in Dublin, 1745-1820: A Calendar of Performances, Volume 6. Lexington Books, 2011.
- Nicoll, Allardyce. A History of English Drama 1660–1900: Volume IV. Cambridge University Press, 2009.
