= Edgar (play) =

1806 play

- Original language: English
- Written by: George Manners
- Genre: Tragedy
- Setting: Scotland

Premiere
- Date: 9 May 1806
- Place: Theatre Royal, Covent Garden, London

Edgar; Or, Caledonian Feuds is an 1806 historical tragedy by the British writer George Manners. It was inspired by Ann Radcliffe's novel The Castles of Athlin and Dunbayne. It premiered at the Theatre Royal, Covent Garden in London on 9 May 1806. The original cast included Sarah Smith as Edgar, Henry Erskine Johnston as Osbert, Alexander Pope as Baron, William Chapman as Malcolm, William Claremont as Count Zulmio, Charles Klanert as Officer, Nannette Johnston as Matilda and Louisa Brunton as Emma. The Irish premiere took place at the Crow Street Theatre in Dublin on 30 April 1808.

== Bibliography ==
- Greene, John C. Theatre in Dublin, 1745-1820: A Calendar of Performances, Volume 6. Lexington Books, 2011.
- Nicoll, Allardyce. A History of English Drama 1660–1900: Volume IV. Cambridge University Press, 2009.
- Townshend, Dale & Wright, Angela (ed.) Ann Radcliffe, Romanticism and the Gothic. Cambridge University Press, 2014.
