= Gabriel-Henri Gaillard =

French historian (1726–1806)

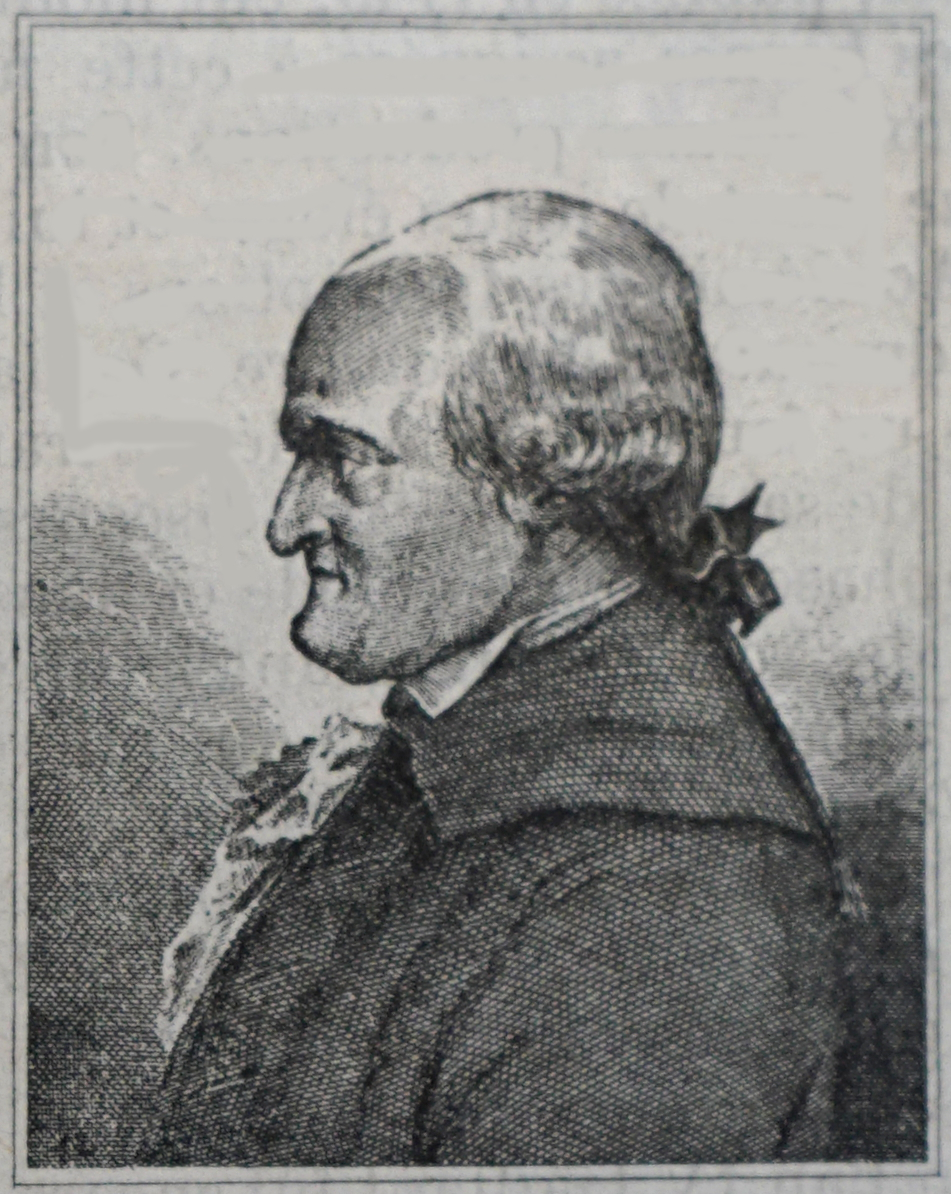
G-H Gaillard

Gabriel-Henri Gaillard (26 March 1726 – 13 February 1806) was a French historian.

== Life ==
Gaillard was born in Ostel, Picardy. He was educated for the bar, but after finishing his studies adopted a literary career, ultimately devoting his chief attention to history. He was already a member of the Academy of Inscriptions and, Belles-lettres (1760), when, after the publication of the three first volumes of his Histoire de la rivalité de la France et d'Angleterre, he was elected to the Académie française (1771); and when Napoleon created the Institute he was admitted into its third class (Académie française) in 1803. For forty years he was the intimate friend of Malesherbes, whose life (1805) he wrote. He died at St Firmin, near Chantilly, on 13 February 1806.

According to the Encyclopædia Britannica Eleventh Edition, "Gaillard is painstaking and impartial in his statement of facts, and his style is correct and elegant, but the unity of his narrative is somewhat destroyed by digressions, and by his method of treating war, politics, civil administration, and ecclesiastical affairs under separate heads."

His most important work was his Histoire de la rivalité de la France et de l'Angleterre (in 11 vols., 1771–1777); and among his other works may be mentioned:

- Essai de la rhétorique française à l'usage des demoiselles (1745), often reprinted, and in 1822 with a life of the author
- Histoire de Marie de Bourgogne (1757)
- Histoire de François I (5 vols., 1776–1779)
- Histoire des grandes querelles entre Charles V. et François II (2 vols., 1777)
- Histoire dc Charlemagne (2 vols., 1782)
- Histoire de la rivalité de la France et de l'Espagne (8 vols., 1801)
- Dictionnaire historique (6 vols., 1789–1804), making part of the Encyclopédie methodique
- Mélanges littéraires, containing éloges on Charles V, Henry IV, Descartes, Corneille, La Fontaine, Malesherbes and others.
