= The Foundling of the Forest =

1809 play

- Original language: English
- Written by: William Dimond
- Genre: Melodrama
- Setting: Alsace, France

Premiere
- Date: 10 July 1809
- Place: Theatre Royal, Drury Lane, London

The Foundling of the Forest is an 1809 melodrama by the British writer William Dimond, also featuring music composed by Michael Kelly. It premiered at the Theatre Royal, Haymarket in London on 10 July 1809. The original Haymarket cast included Charles Mayne Young as Count De Valmont, Richard Jones as Florian, Edmund John Eyre as Baron Loungeville, Charles Farley as Bertrand, John Liston as L'Eclair, Maria Gibbs as Geraldine, Sarah Liston as Rosabelle, Mary Ann Davenport as Monica and Julia Glover as Unknown Female. The Irish premiere was at the Crow Street Theatre in Dublin in December 1810. It also appeared at the Park Theatre in New York City. Dimond dedicated the published version to Sophia Lee.

== Synopsis ==
Florian is abandoned in the woods as a small child and grows up living on his own resources. It is only at the conclusion of the story that he is revealed to be of aristocratic birth.

== Bibliography ==
- Greene, John C. Theatre in Dublin, 1745-1820: A Calendar of Performances, Volume 6. Lexington Books, 2011.
- Miller, Julie. Abandoned: Foundlings in Nineteenth-century New York City. NYU Press, 2008.
- Nicoll, Allardyce. A History of English Drama 1660–1900: Volume IV. Cambridge University Press, 2009.
