= John Poole (playwright) =

English playwright

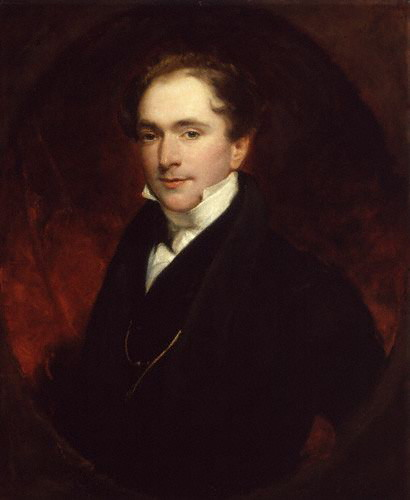
- Poole by Henry Pickersgill, 1827
- Born: 1787
- Died: 1872 (aged 85–86)
- Resting place: Highgate Cemetery, England. United Kingdom
- Occupations: Playwright and author
- Writing career
- Period: 1810–1872
- Genres: Satire, farce
- Notable work: Paul Pry

John Poole (1786–1872), an English playwright, was one of the earliest and best known 19th century playwrights of the comic drama, the farce.

== Biography ==
Paul Pry is considered his most notable work, while Hamlet Travestie, performed as a burlesque, was the first Shakespeare parody since the Restoration.

He was buried in a common grave, plot no.18577, on the eastern side of Highgate Cemetery.

== Selected works ==
=== Plays ===
- Hamlet travestie: in three acts (1810)
- Othello-travestie in three acts. (1813)
- The hole in the wall: a farce, in two acts (1813)
- Intrigue, or, Married yesterday: a comic interlude, in one act (1814)
- Who's who?, or, The double imposture: a farce, in two acts (1815)
- A short reign and a merry one: a petite comedy, in two acts (1819). First performed at the Theatre Royal, Covent Garden on 1819-11-19
- The two pages of Frederick the Great: a comic piece, in two acts (1821)
- Deaf as a post: a farce, in one act, two scenes (1823) First performed at Drury Lane February, 1823.
- Simpson and Co. a comedy in one act (1823)
- A year in an hour, or, The cock of the walk: a farce, in two acts (1824)
- Scapegoat: a farce, in one act (1824)
- Paul Pry: a comedy, in three acts (1825)
- Tribulation, or, Unwelcome visitors: a comedy, in two acts (1825)
- Twixt the Cup and Lip (1827)
- Simpson & co. : a comedy, in two acts (1827)
- The wife's stratagem, or, more frightened than hurt : a comedy, in three acts (1827)
- The wealthy widow, or, They're both to blame: a comedy, in three acts (1827)
- Lodgings for Single Gentlemen (1829)
- Turning the tables: a farce, in one act (1830)
- Past and present; or, The hidden treasure: a drama, in three acts (1830)
- Old and young, a farce, in one act. (1831) First performed at English Opera Company, Theatre Royal, Adelphi with 31 performances during the period of 1831-07-04 through 1831-09-28
- A soldier's courtship; [or love at first sight: a comedy, in one act. (1833)
- Patrician & parvenu, or, Confusion worse confounded: a comedy, in five acts (1835)
- Atonement, or, The god-daughter: a drama, in two acts (1836)
- 'Twould puzzle a conjurer, or, The two Peters (1838)
- The atonement; or, The God-daughter: a drama, in two acts (1840)
- Rumfuskin, King of the North Pole, or, Treason rewarded: a tragedy for the first of April (1841)
- Phineas Quiddy, or, Sheer industry (1842)
- Lodgings for single gentlemen a farce in one act (1850)
- Scan. Mag, or, The village gossip: a popular farce, in two acts (1850)
- The Dutch governor, or, 'Twould puzzle a conjuror : a modern standard drama (185-)
- Intrigue, or, The Bath road; a comic interlude, in one act (186?)
- My wife! What wife? a farce, in one or two acts (1872)
- Match making: a petite comedy, in one act (18--)
- A pair of razors : a farce, in one act (18--)
- Uncle Sam, or, A nabob for an hour: a farce, in two acts

=== Other ===
- Two papers : a theatrical critique and an essay (being no. 999 of the Pretender) on sonnet-writing, and sonnet-writers in general : including a Sonnet on myself (1819)
- Phineas Quiddy A new novel. (1842)
- Paul Pry's Journal of a residence at Little Pedlington. (1836)
- Little Pedlington and the Pedlingtonians (1839) (expanded version of 1836 Paul Pry's Journal)
- Christmas festivities: tales, sketches, and characters, with Beauties of the modern drama, in four specimens (1845)
