= Julian (play) =

1823 play

- Original language: English
- Written by: Mary Russell Mitford
- Genre: Tragedy
- Setting: Messina, Kingdom of Sicily

Premiere
- Date: 15 March 1823
- Place: Theatre Royal, Covent Garden, London

Julian is an 1823 historical tragedy by the British writer Mary Russell Mitford. It premiered at the Theatre Royal, Covent Garden on 15 March 1823. The original cast included William Macready as Julian, Maria Foote as Alphonso, King of Sicily, George John Bennett as Duke of Melfi, William Abbot as Count D'Alba, Daniel Egerton as Leanti, William Chapman as Calvi, Thomas Comer as Bertone and Maria Lacy as Annabel. Mitford wrote the play during the delays over the staging of her previous work Foscari which finally premiered in 1826. It is influenced by the 1820 rebellion on Sicily and its defeat and repression by Bourbon forces.

== Bibliography ==
- Burwick, Frederick Goslee, Nancy Moore & Hoeveler Diane Long . The Encyclopedia of Romantic Literature. John Wiley & Sons, 2012.
- Nicoll, Allardyce. A History of Early Nineteenth Century Drama 1800-1850. Cambridge University Press, 1930.
