= George Bartley (comedian) =

English stage comedian (c.1782–1858)

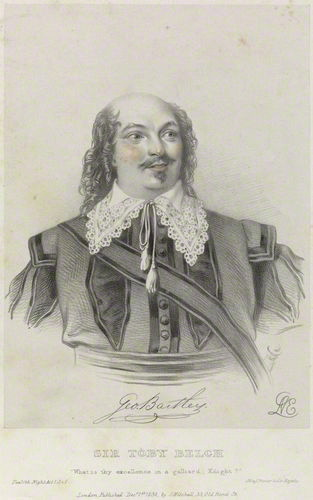
- George Bartley as Sir Toby Belch; 1838 lithograph by Richard James Lane after Alfred Edward Chalon
- Born: c. 1782; Bath, Somerset
- Died: 22 July 1858 (aged c.76); London
- Occupation: Stage actor

George Bartley (1782?–1858) was an English stage comedian. He was successful in playing comic old men and bluff uncles, and Falstaff became his favourite character. He had roles in many Shakespearean Comedies throughout his career spanning over half a century.

== Early life ==
Bartley was born in Bath, Somerset presumably in or about 1782. His father was box-keeper at the Bath Theatre. While still a youth he acquired some stage experience, appearing in characters ordinarily assigned to women, such as the page in John Cartwright Cross's musical drama, The Purse. After a period of odd jobs, Bartley appeared at Cheltenham in the summer of 1800 as Orlando in As You Like It. He is said to have appeared again in Bath, and then joined a travelling company.

In Guernsey he made his first marriage, his wife being a member of the company, named Stanton, by whom he was nursed through an illness.

== In London ==
To the influence of Dorothea Jordan, who in 1802 saw him in Margate, Bartley was indebted for his engagement by Richard Brinsley Sheridan at Drury Lane Theatre. His first appearance in London is said to have taken place on 11 December 1802, but the exact date is disputed; it was perhaps, as he himself states, a week later. His opening character was Orlando. John Genest makes no mention of him before 20 September 1803, when he is described as playing Colloony in The Irishman in Distress, a farce of William Macready the Elder. Walley Chamberlain Oulton, in his History of the Theatres of London, states that on 19 January 1803, Barrymore, while playing Polydore in The Orphan by Thomas Otway, went down with a serious illness, and resigned the character to Bartley.: Bartley however is advertised as appearing as Don Philip in She Would and She Would Not at the Theatre Royal, Drury Lane on 20 January 1803. According to a reference in The Times, Bartley was part of the original cast in John Tobin's The Honey Moon, given at Drury Lane on 31 January 1805, in which he created the role of Count Montalban.

For some five years Bartley seems to have been mainly employed as understudy, replacing John Bannister, who then took serious characters, and occasionally attempting roles left vacant by the departure of Charles Kemble.

== Later life ==
Dissatisfied with his earnings, he left London and played in the provinces. In 1809–11 he managed unsuccessfully the Glasgow Theatre. Subsequently, he acted with increasing reputation as a comedian in Manchester, Liverpool, and other towns. In 1814 he married his second wife, Sarah Smith, a tragic actress, by whose reputation his own has been overshadowed. On 13 October the same year, Mrs. Bartley played Ophelia at Drury Lane, and on 12 April following Bartley reappeared at the same house as Falstaff. A trip of the Bartleys to America, which followed in 1818, proved successful. On his return Bartley accepted a winter engagement at Covent Garden Theatre, and played during the summer under Samuel James Arnold at the Lyceum. During Lent, Bartley was in the habit of giving a series of discourses on astronomy at the Lyceum. He also lectured on poetry.

In 1829, when the management of Covent Garden collapsed, Bartley headed the actors who came forward with a proposal, which was accepted, to furnish funds and recommence performances. He became accordingly, in 1829–30, stage manager of the theatre, the season at which, owing to the appearance of Fanny Kemble, was very profitable. During successive ownerships by Laporte, Alfred Bunn, William Macready, and Madame Vestris, he retained this post. He was many years treasurer of the Covent Garden Theatrical Fund.

The loss in 1843 of his son, who was at Exeter College, Oxford, led to Bartley's retirement from the stage. His only remaining child, a daughter, died shortly afterwards, and Mrs. Bartley, in 1850, followed her children.

In 1850, Bartley played Falstaff at Windsor Castle in the performance arranged by Charles Kean. He then appeared for a few nights at the Princess's, taking his farewell benefit on 18 December 1852, on which occasion, in his address to the public, he said: 'This night, ladies and gentlemen, fifty years ago, this very night, the night of the week, and the date of the month, I had the honour to appear in London, and to make my bow before your sires and grandsires.'

== Death ==
On Saturday, 17 July 1858, Bartley had an attack of paralysis, to which, five days later, 22 July, he succumbed. He died in Woburn Square, and is said to be buried in the churchyard of St. Mary's, Oxford.
