= George Manners (editor) =

British consul, writer and editor

George Manners (1778–1853) was a writer and editor who served as British consul in Boston, Massachusetts from 1819 to 1839. His 1806 tragedy Edgar was staged at the Theatre Royal, Covent Garden in 1806.

Manners was born in 1778. He was called to the bar, became a noted wit in London, and was in 1807 founder and one of the proprietors of the Satirist, or Monthly Meteor, a venture in scurrilous literature, issued monthly, with a view, it was claimed, to the exposure of impostors. The first issue appeared on 1 October 1807. At first coloured cartoons were attempted, but it is stated in the preface to volume II that these were dropped owing to the artists having disappointed the editor. In 1812 Manners parted with it and the publishing offices at 267 Strand to William Jerdan, who tried his luck "with a new series, divested of the personalities and rancour of the old." Despite the bad bargain which he made over this purchase, Jerdan described Manners in his Autobiography as "gentleman in every sense of the word, full of fancy and talent, acute and well informed". The periodical ceased in 1824. In 1819 Manners became British consul at Boston, and held office till 1839. He died at Coburg in Canada on 18 February 1853.

Manners wrote:

- Edgar, or the Caledonian Brothers, a tragedy, London, 1806,
- Mentoriana, or a Letter of Admonition to the Duke of York, 1807
- Vindiciie Satirices, or a Vindication of the Principles of the "Satirist," 1809
- The Rival Impostors, or Two Political Epistles to Two Political Cheats, 1809
- The Conflagration : a Poem, Boston, 1826, written to assist the sufferers in Canadian fires.
