= Sarah Bartley =

British actress (1783–1850)

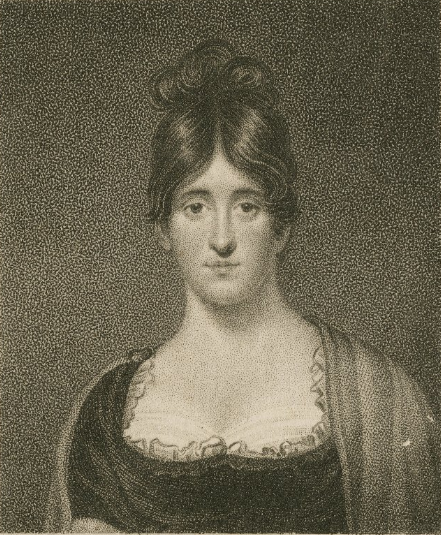
- Born: 23 October 1783
- Died: 14 January 1850 (aged 66)
- Occupation: Actress

Sarah Bartley (1783–1850) was a British actress who began her career when she was 16.

== Biography ==
=== Personal ===
Bartley is generally stated to have been born in 1785. The anonymous author of the Biography of the British Stage (1824), who appears to have received his information at first hand, advances, however, 23 October 1783 as the day of her birth. In regard to the parentage and early education of Bartley the conflict of statements is hopeless. According to the account obviously supplied by herself or her husband to the authority previously given, her father was an actor named Williamson, belonging to a country company, and her mother was the daughter of General Dillon, of Galway. Walter Donaldson, who speaks with much apparent knowledge, states, on the contrary, that her first name was O'Shaughnessy, and that both her parents were Irish. The name of Smith was adopted after her mother's second marriage, in 1793, with an actor of that name belonging to the Salisbury company. Before this time Miss Williamson or O'Shaughnessy had appeared in Salisbury as Edward in Mrs. Inchbald's comedy, 'Every one has his Fault.'

=== Career ===
Her début in a serious character took place in Lancashire, probably in Liverpool, when she was sixteen years of age, as Joanna in Holcroft's 'Deserted Daughter.' A three years' experience under Stephen Kemble in Edinburgh disgusted her with the stage, from which she retired. Yielding to circumstances, however, she conquered her dislike, and solicited and obtained an engagement from Tate Wilkinson, the famous manager of the York circuit. Upon his death in 1803 she went to Birmingham and thence to Bath. She was here seen by the younger Harris, who engaged her for Covent Garden, at which house she appeared on 2 October 1805 as Lady Towneley in The Provoked Husband. Very reluctantly did she consent to make her début in comedy. To appease her, accordingly, she was allowed to recite Collins's 'Ode on the Passions.' Her success in this recitation, which was brought into fashion by Mrs. Siddons, consoled her for a lukewarm reception in Lady Towneley. The management, finding her engagement unprofitable in consequence of Mrs. Siddons enjoying a monopoly of the characters in which Miss Smith would be of service, sought vainly to get rid of her. In 1808–9 she played with signal success in Dublin, in which city she recited, for her benefit, a monologue written expressly for her by Thomas Moore. After her return her reception in London was increasingly cordial. She now migrated to Drury Lane Theatre, in which house, 23 January 1813, she 'created' the character of Teresa in Coleridge's 'Remorse.' On 23 August 1814 she married George Bartley, described by Donaldson as her first love.

The retirement of Mrs. Siddons, 29 June 1812, left for a while the stage open to her. Two years later, however, the appearance of Miss O'Neill, with whom she was unable to cope, thwarted her hopes. Although in 1815 she played as leading lady opposite Kean in a season of plays which included Romeo and Juliet, she was becoming too mature for such parts and her previously much-admired vocal delivery was attacked as affected.

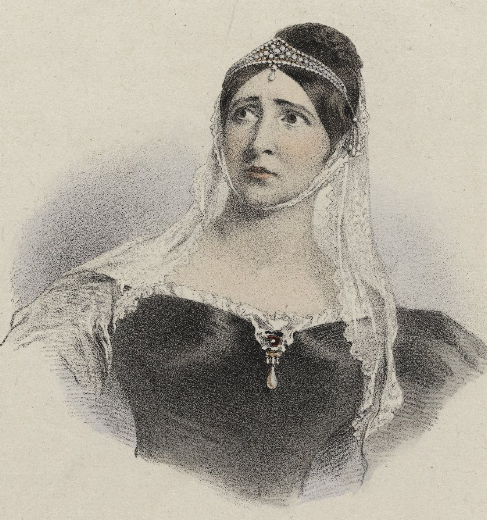
Sarah Bartley as Lady Macbeth: He is about it ... act 2, sc. 2

In 1818, Mrs. Bartley accompanied her husband to America, where she obtained both reputation and fortune. Returning in 1820 she played in the country, and on 15 November 1823 reappeared at Covent Garden as Mrs. Beverley in the 'Gamester.' Her performances were, however, infrequent. In the character of Lady Macbeth she finally retired from the stage.

The loss of her two children (see George Bartley) greatly affected her. Shortly after the loss of her daughter she was stricken with paralysis. After lingering some years she died 14 January 1850.

Her talents were genuine, though Macready in his memoirs depreciates her method. Leigh Hunt calls her the second tragic actress of her day, and says she possesses 'a strong and singular originality, a genius for the two extremes of histrionic talent (sic), lofty tragedy and low comedy.' The two characters which led him to believe in her capacity for tragedy and farce are Belvidera in ‘Venice Preserved,’ and Estifania in ‘Rule a Wife and have a Wife.’ Adolphus, in his 'Recollections,’ speaks of her as the only actress before the appearance of Miss O'Neill to succeed Mrs. Siddons. Donaldson says she 'had a noble and expressive face, full, strong, and melodious voice, capable of any intonation, and an original conception of her author.'
