= John Liston =

British comedian

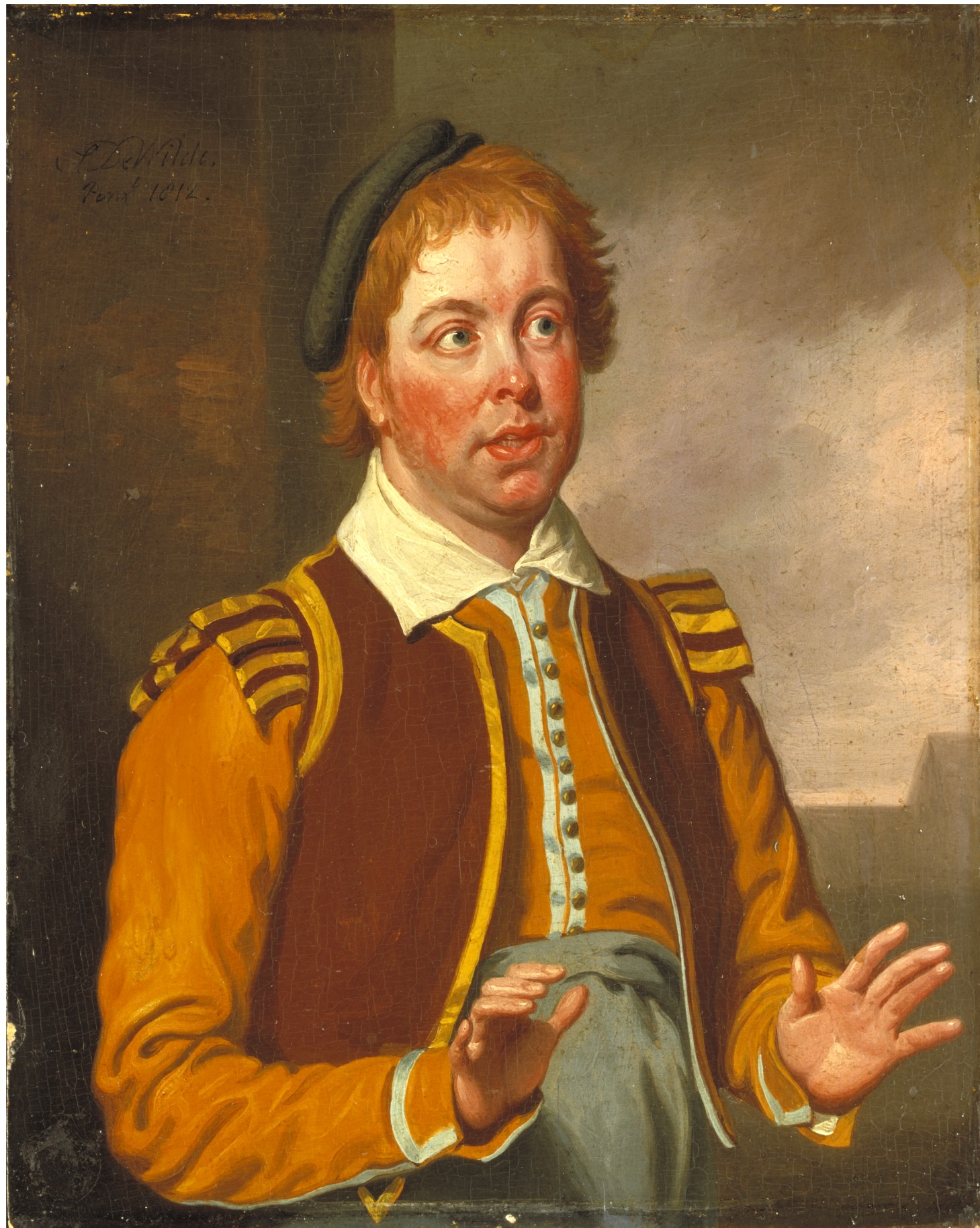
Liston as Pompey in Measure for Measure, by Samuel De Wilde.

John Liston (c. 1776 – 22 March 1846), English comedian, was born in London.

He made his public debut on the stage at Weymouth as Lord Duberley in The Heir at Law. After several dismal failures in tragic parts, some of them in support of Mrs Siddons, he discovered accidentally that his forte was comedy, especially in the personation of old men and country boys, in which he displayed a fund of drollery and broad humour. An introduction to Charles Kemble led to his appearance at the Haymarket on 10 June 1805 as Sheepface in The Village Lawyer, and his association with this theatre continued with few interruptions until 1830.

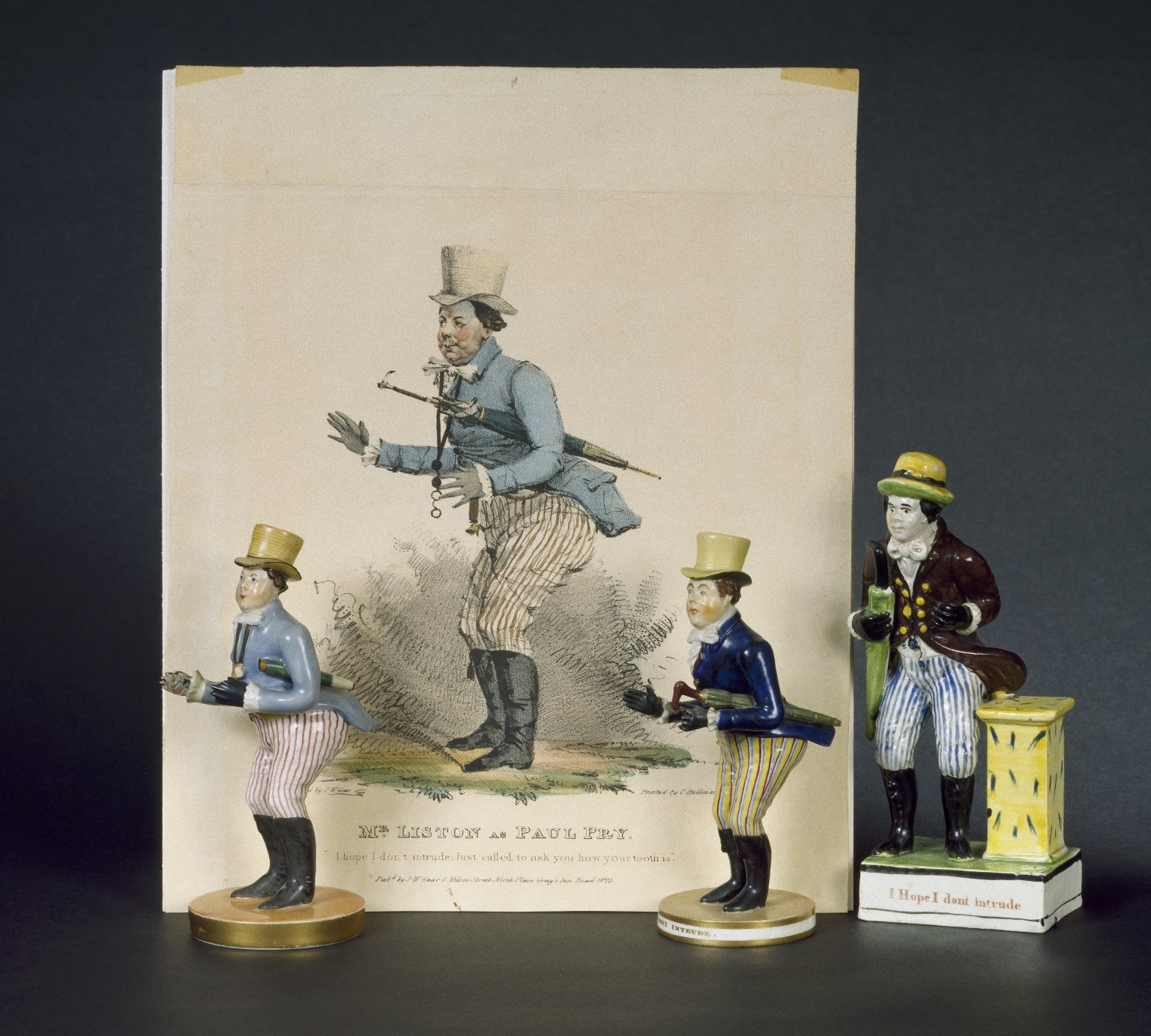
Liston as Paul Pry, 1825.

Paul Pry, the most famous of all his impersonations, was first presented on 13 September 1825 and soon became, thanks to his creative genius, a real personage. Liston remained on the stage until 1837; during his last years his mind failed, and he died on 22 March 1846. He had married in 1807 Sarah Liston, formerly Tyrer, (1781–1854), a singer and actress.

In the January 1825 of the London Magazine there appeared a Memoir of John Liston written by his close friend Charles Lamb. This was said by Lamb to be "pure invention" and intended as a humorous essay. Liston himself replied to this Memoir in the following edition of the London Magazine suggesting that the same writer pen a short life of Byron.

Several pictures of Liston in character are in the Garrick Club, London, and as Paul Pry in the South Kensington Museum and the Royal Conservatoire of Scotland archives.

== Selected roles ==
- Richard in Errors Excepted by Thomas Dibdin (1807)
- L'Eclair in The Foundling of the Forest by William Dimond (1809)
