= The Bride of Abydos (play) =

The Bride of Abydos is a drama in 3 acts written by William Dimond and based on Lord Byron's same-titled poem. It was staged on 5 February 1818 at Drury Lane and published the same year by Richard White in London. It was one of three Dimond's plays whose action takes place in Turkey, the other two being Abon Hassan (based on 1001 nights) and Aethiop, or the Child of the Desart. In the first edition the drama is called "a tragic play", while in the second (printed in London by Thomas Hailes Lacy) it is labelled as "a romantic drama". Dimond's play had an influence on Percy Bysshe Shelley's Hellas.

Byron's poem was too short to make a full-length play of it, and Dimond made many additions to it. Furthermore, he found the final too gloomy and catastrophic and substituted it by an incident from Byron's another poem, The Corsair. All these changes were explained by the author in the Preface.

For the first performance the scenery was made by Greenwood and the music was composed by Michael Kelly (it included an opening chorus, 8 songs, a duet, a bass solo, and a glee). There were also dances.

== Roles ==
Role	1818 Drury Lane	1836 Belfast	1840 Sheffield
Giaffier; Pacha of Abydos	H. Johnston	T.H. Lacy	Johnson
Selim his supposed son	Kean	G.V. Brooke	T.H. Lacy
Mirza; Pirate of the Isles	Pope	Whyte	Norton
Osman Bey; The timariot chief	T. Cooke	Eburne	H. Bedford
Hamet; Osman's page	Bellchambers		Earnshaw
Hassan; Governor of the haram	Holland	Cunningham	Cunningham
Murteza	Barnard	Connor	Symondson
Zoran	Coveney		Hind
Bensalla	Kent		Davis
Muley; Pirate	Smith	Marquis	McMahon
Chebib; Pirate	J. Smith		Thompson
Azein; Pirate	Woolf		Hall
Zuleika; The Bride of Abydos	Mardyn	W. Burroughs	C. Pope
Zobeide; Zuleika's attendant	Bland	Cunningham	Cunningham
Oneiza; Zuleika's attendant	Cubitt		Earnshaw
Canzade; Zuleika's attendant	Hughes		A. Mercer
Safie; Zuleika's attendant	Halford		J. Cooke
