= William Dimond =

English playwright of the early 19th-century

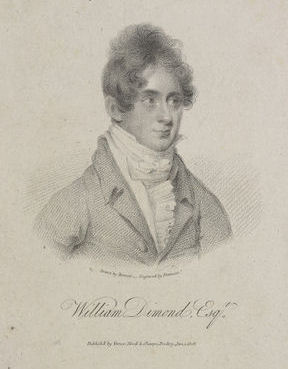
William Dimond in 1808

William Fisher Peach Dimond (11 December 1781 – c1837) was a playwright of the early 19th century who wrote about thirty works for the theatre, including plays, operas, musical entertainments and melodramas.

== Life ==
He was born in Bath in Somerset in December 1781, the eldest surviving son of William Wyatt Dimond (1750–1812), an actor and theatrical manager, and his wife, Matilda Martha, née Baker (1757–1823). His father was the manager at the Old Orchard Street Theatre and later the Theatre Royal, Bath together with the Theatre Royal in Bristol. William Dimond received his education from the Rev. James Morgan D.D.; and by 1807 was a member 'of the Honourable Society of the Inner Temple', having been articled in 1798.

Dimon contributed Della Cruscan poems to the Morning Herald under the pen name 'Castalio'. His work Petrarchal Sonnets, and Miscellaneous Poems was published in 1800 by private subscription and dedicated to the Duchess of York; however, the book was "criticized for its immature extravagances of diction".

In 1801 Dimond's comic opera The Sea-Side Story was performed as a benefit piece and proved somewhat of a success. The actress Sarah Egerton appeared at Bath in his The Hero of the North (1809), Daniel Terry played Bertrand in The Foundling of the Forest (1809) in Edinburgh, while Catherine Stephens was the original Donna Isidora in Dimond's Brother and Sister (1815). The actor and playwright Thomas Hailes Lacy made his London début in 1828 as Lenoir in Dimond's The Foundling of the Forest at the Olympic Theatre.

When Dimond's father died in 1812 William Dimond took over the management of the Theatre Royal, Bath and the Theatre Royal, Bristol. By 1817 he was living in what had been the family home in Norfolk Crescent, Bath. He gave up the management of the Theatre Royal in Bath on the death of his mother in 1823.

== Works ==
Described as a "prolific playwright of little quality and a theatrical manager of little more", Dimond wrote about thirty works for the theatre, including operas, musical entertainments and melodramas, the latter including The Broken Sword (1816). The Oxford English Dictionary claims that in The Broken Sword Dimond originated the term 'chestnut', now a common British slang term for an old joke, often as 'old chestnut'. In his play one character keeps repeating the same stories, one of them about a cork tree, and is interrupted each time by another character who says: "Chestnut, you mean ... I have heard you tell the joke twenty-seven times and I am sure it was a chestnut".

Most of Dimond's works were written for the Theatre Royal, Bath, of which he assumed the management after the death of his father in 1812. His stage works "evinced a strong tendency towards the striking tableau, the exotic setting, and the picturesque pose". He adapted Byron's 1813 work The Bride of Abydos for the stage as a play of the same name (1818) for Drury Lane. It was one of three of Dimond's plays whose action takes place in Turkey, the other two being Abon Hassan (based on One Thousand and One Nights) and Aethiop, or the Child of the Desert. Dimond's play had an influence on Percy Bysshe Shelley's Hellas.

The British Critic approved of his Adrian and Orilla, or, A Mother's Vengeance but thought the dialogue "generally too florid, bordering frequently upon affectation, and occasionally … not far removed from nonsense". The review by the British Critic of Dimond's patriotic extravaganza The Royal Oak (1811) said:

We have often met with Mr. Dimond, and have always found something to praise and something to censure in him. It will never be better. The talents he received from nature have wanted the cultivation of good taste; and the offences against propriety which wild genius commits, will never be corrected by ill-judging audiences.

William Hazlitt found in Dimond's plays:

"... so strong a family likeness that, from having seen any one of them, we may form a tolerable correct idea of the rest … The author does not profess to provide a public entertainment at his own entire expense, and from his own proper funds, but contracts with the manager to get up a striking and impressive exhibition in conjunction with the scene-painter, the scene-shifter, the musical composer, the orchestra, the chorusses on the stage, and the lungs of the actors!"

In his play Stage Struck (1835) Dimond burlesqued the then vogue for melodramatic styles of acting.

== Hoaxer ==
Alfred Bunn stated that Dimond spent time in many jails (in Horsemonger Lane, under the name of James Bryant,) and tried in many courts, (he was said to have been tried at the Croydon Assizes under the name of William Driver,) "under many names, for heinous crimes — out of all of which he escaped by more miracles; his deeds at Bath, the early and great scene of his profligacy, would fit a volume in the narration".

Bunn may indeed not have been being entirely truthful concerning the past of the recently deceased Dimond, who of course could not defend himself against the claims. Bunn had been hoaxed by Dimond in 1834 by some forged letters said to have been written by the actress Charlotte Mardyn, rumoured to have been a mistress of Lord Byron, offering to come and perform Byron's work Sardanapalus as he had taught her for Bunn's production. Bunn printed that she would appear but 'Mrs Mardyn' withdrew from the production at the last minute "owing to ill health", and Bunn investigated to discover that Dimond had probably written the letters and sent them from Paris. The fact that Mrs. Mardyn was widely known among theatrical circles to be largely illiterate should perhaps have served as a warning. Bunn recorded that William Dimond died in Paris in late 1837.
