= The Bride of Abydos (Delacroix) =

Painting by Eugène Delacroix

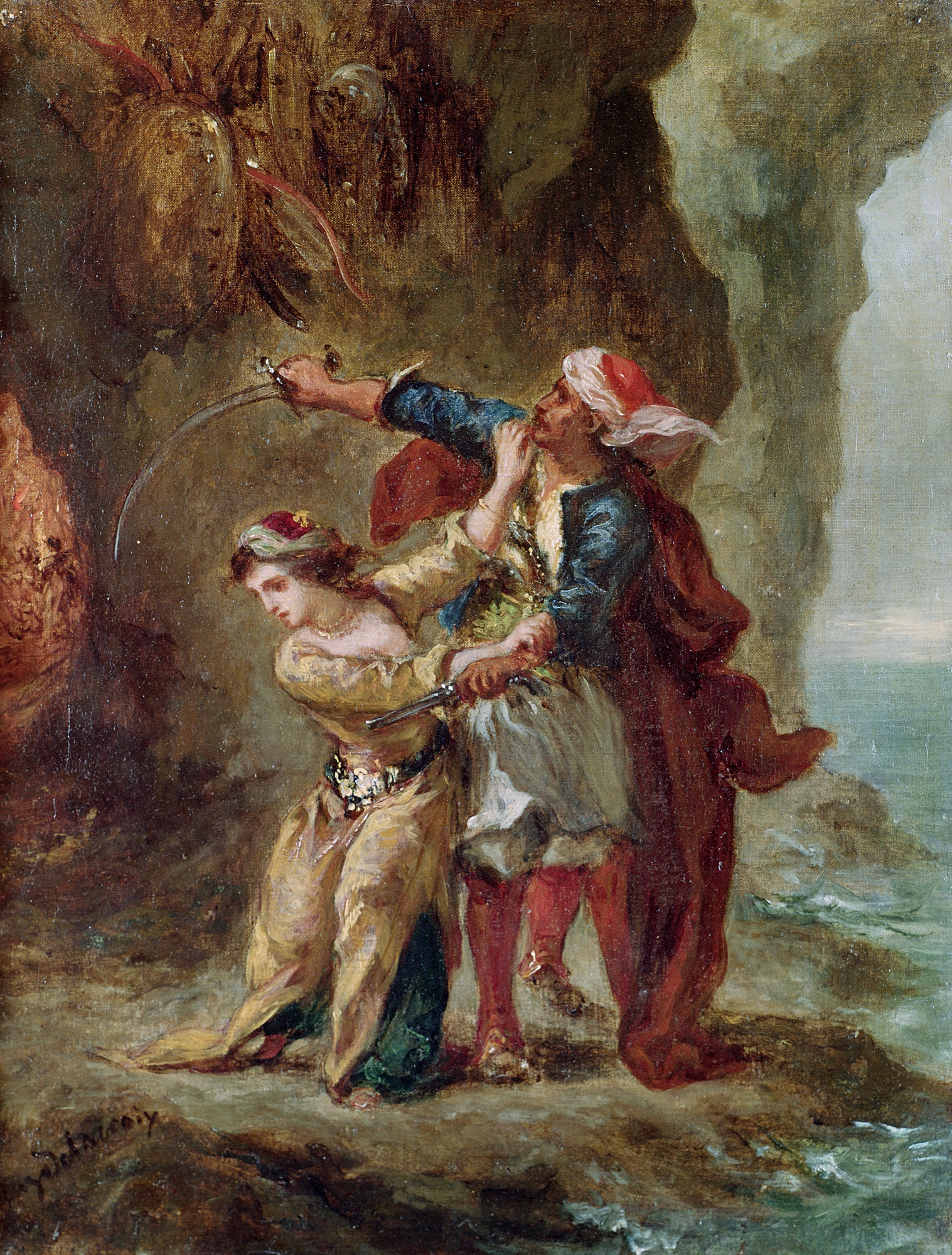
The Bride of Abydos (c. 1843–1849) by Eugène Delacroix

The Bride of Abydos (French – La Fiancée d'Abydos) or Selim and Zuleika is the title of two paintings by the French Romantic painter Eugène Delacroix, one in the Museum of Fine Arts of Lyon (pre-1849) and another in the Louvre (1843–1849).

Both works show the characters Selim and Zuleika from the poem of the same name by Lord Byron, written after he had swum the Hellespont between Abydos and Sestos in imitation of Leander.
