= Chestnut (joke) =

British slang term for an old joke

Chestnut is a British slang term for an old joke, often as old chestnut. The term is also used for a piece of music in the repertoire that has grown stale or hackneyed with too much repetition.

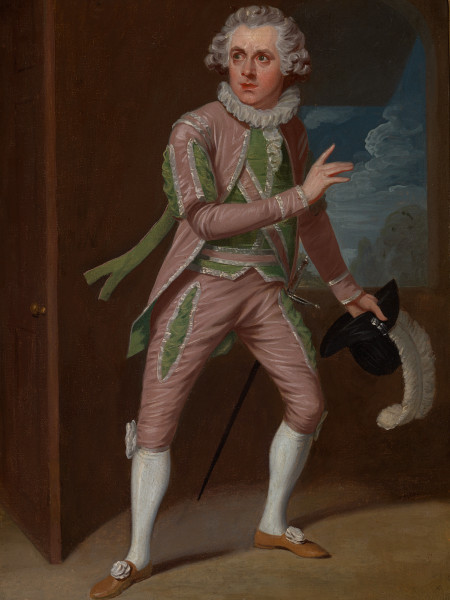
William Dimond, one of whose plays may originate the term "chestnut"

A plausible explanation for the term given by the Oxford English Dictionary is that it originates from a play named The Broken Sword by William Dimond, in which one character keeps repeating the same stories, one of them about a cork tree, and is interrupted each time by another character who says: "Chestnut, you mean ... I have heard you tell the joke twenty-seven times and I am sure it was a chestnut." The play was first performed in 1816, but the term "old chestnut" did not come into widespread usage until the 1880s.

== See also ==
- old chestnut in Wiktionary
