= Henry William Pickersgill =

English painter (1782–1875)

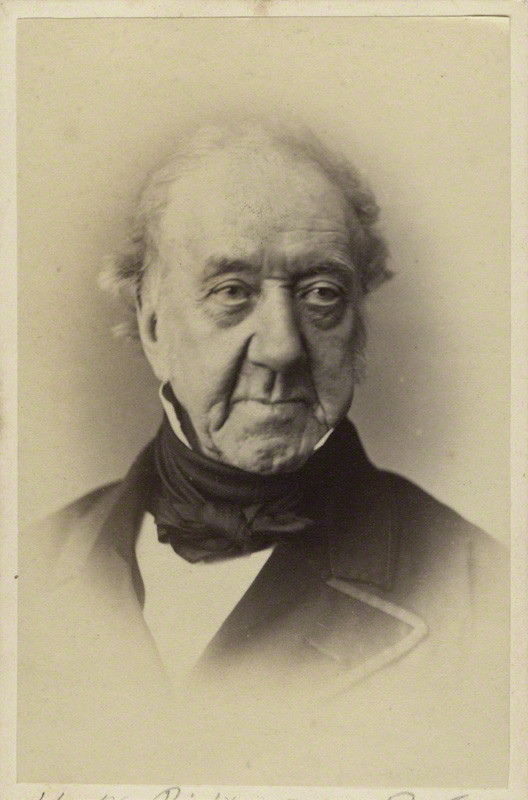
- William Pickersgill in the 1860s
- Born: 3 December 1782; London, England
- Died: 21 April 1875 (aged 92)
- Education: École nationale supérieure des Beaux-Arts, Paris
- Known for: Painter of portraits
- Movement: Orientalist

Henry William Pickersgill RA (3 December 1782 – 21 April 1875) was an English painter specialising in portraits. He was a Royal Academician for almost fifty years, and painted many of the most notable figures of his time.

== Biography ==
Born in London, Pickersgill was adopted in his youth by a Mr Hall, a silk manufacturer in Spitalfields, who financed his schooling and then took him into the family business. When war caused difficult trading conditions, Pickersgill opted to develop his talent for painting into a career, and was a pupil of landscape artist George Arnald between 1802 and 1805 before entering the Royal Academy Schools as a student in November 1805.

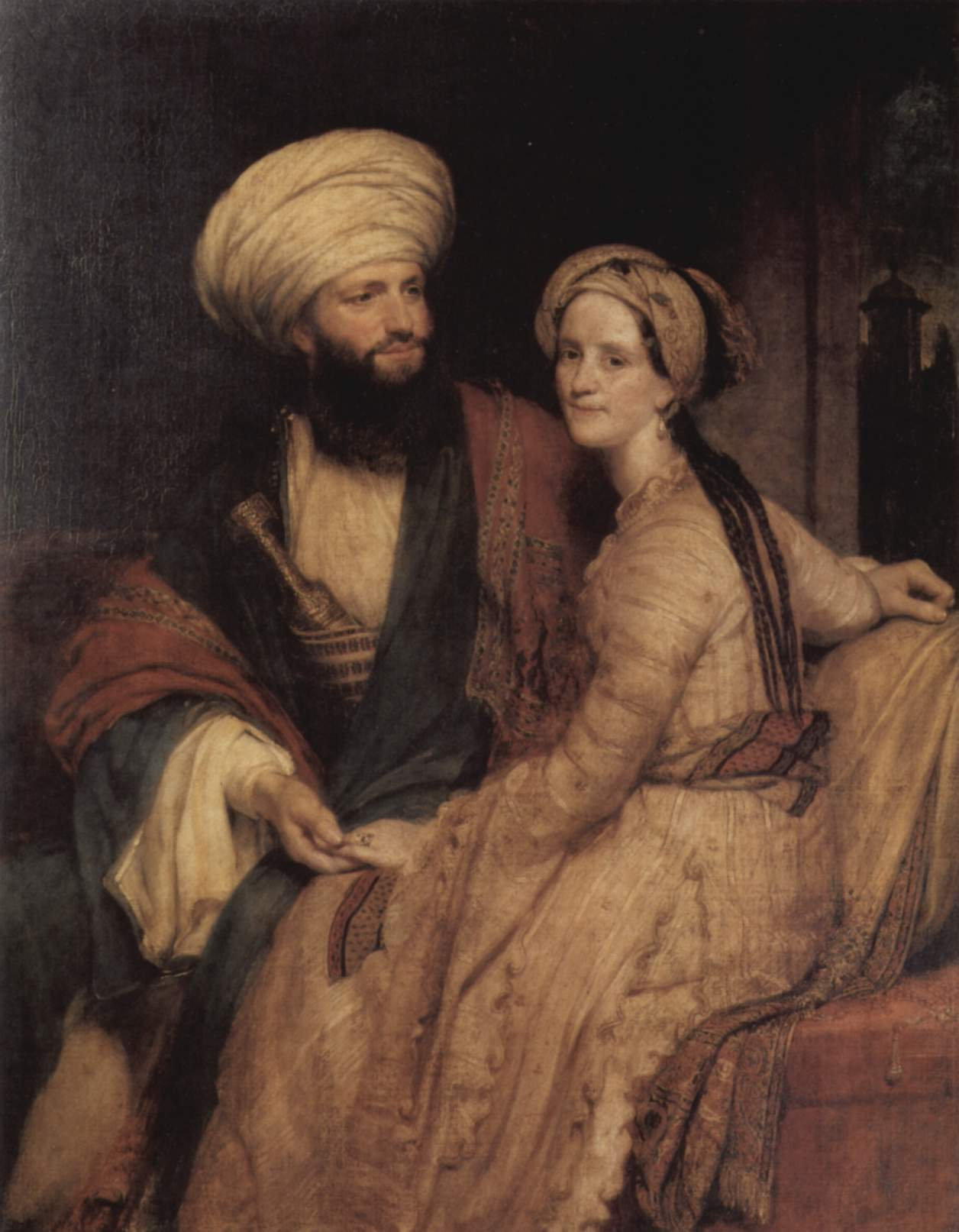
James Silk Buckingham and his Wife in Arab Dress, 1816

His early subjects were varied and included landscapes and classical and historical themes, but he eventually settled to portraiture as his speciality. His first exhibit at the Royal Academy was a portrait of his benefactor Mr Hall, and during his lifetime he showed a total of 384 paintings there. He was elected to associate membership of the Academy in November 1822 and full membership in February 1826.

Pickersgill was one of the pre-eminent portrait painters of his day. Robert Peel, William Wordsworth, George Stephenson, Jeremy Bentham, Letitia Elizabeth Landon, Elizabeth Barrett Browning, Lord Nelson, the Duke of Wellington and Faraday were among the many notable people who sat for him. He famously painted author James Silk Buckingham and his wife Elizabeth in Arab costume in 1816, reflecting Buckingham's own travels in the East as well as the fashion of the times for the Orient. The National Portrait Gallery, London has over 50 of his portraits in its collection, including 16 original oils and 35 engravings after him, along with a small number of portraits of Pickersgill himself by others.

From 1856 to 1864, he was librarian of the Royal Academy. He retired from the institution in December 1872, and died at his home in Blandford Square, London, at the age of 93. He is buried in Barnes Cemetery.

Pickersgill's brother Richard, son Henry Hall and nephew Frederick Richard were also painters. His wife Jeanette published a volume of poetry in 1827 entitled Tales of the Harem. After her death in 1885, Mrs Pickersgill became the first person to be legally cremated in the United Kingdom at Woking Crematorium.

In his will, Pickersgill left a bequest to the Royal National Lifeboat Institution (RNLI). A 35-foot self-righting lifeboat Henry William Pickersgill R.A., was placed at Dover Lifeboat Station, in service between 1878 and 1888.

Letitia Elizabeth Landon's poem The Oriental Nosegay by Pickersgill in her Poetical Sketches of Modern Pictures (in The Troubadour, 1826) probably refers to his Oriental Love Letter (1824) in the R. A. collection.

== Gallery ==
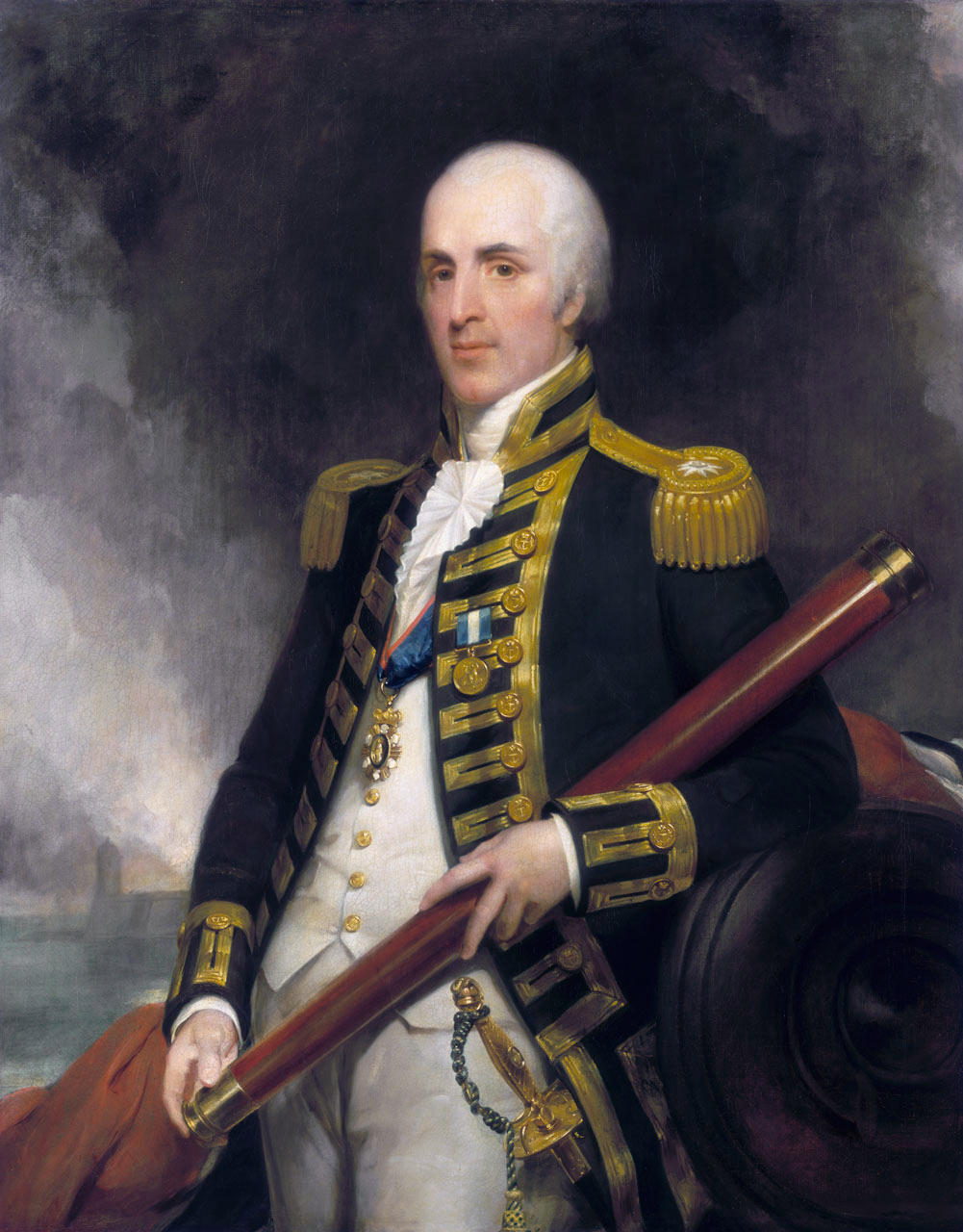
Alexander Ball, 1805–1809

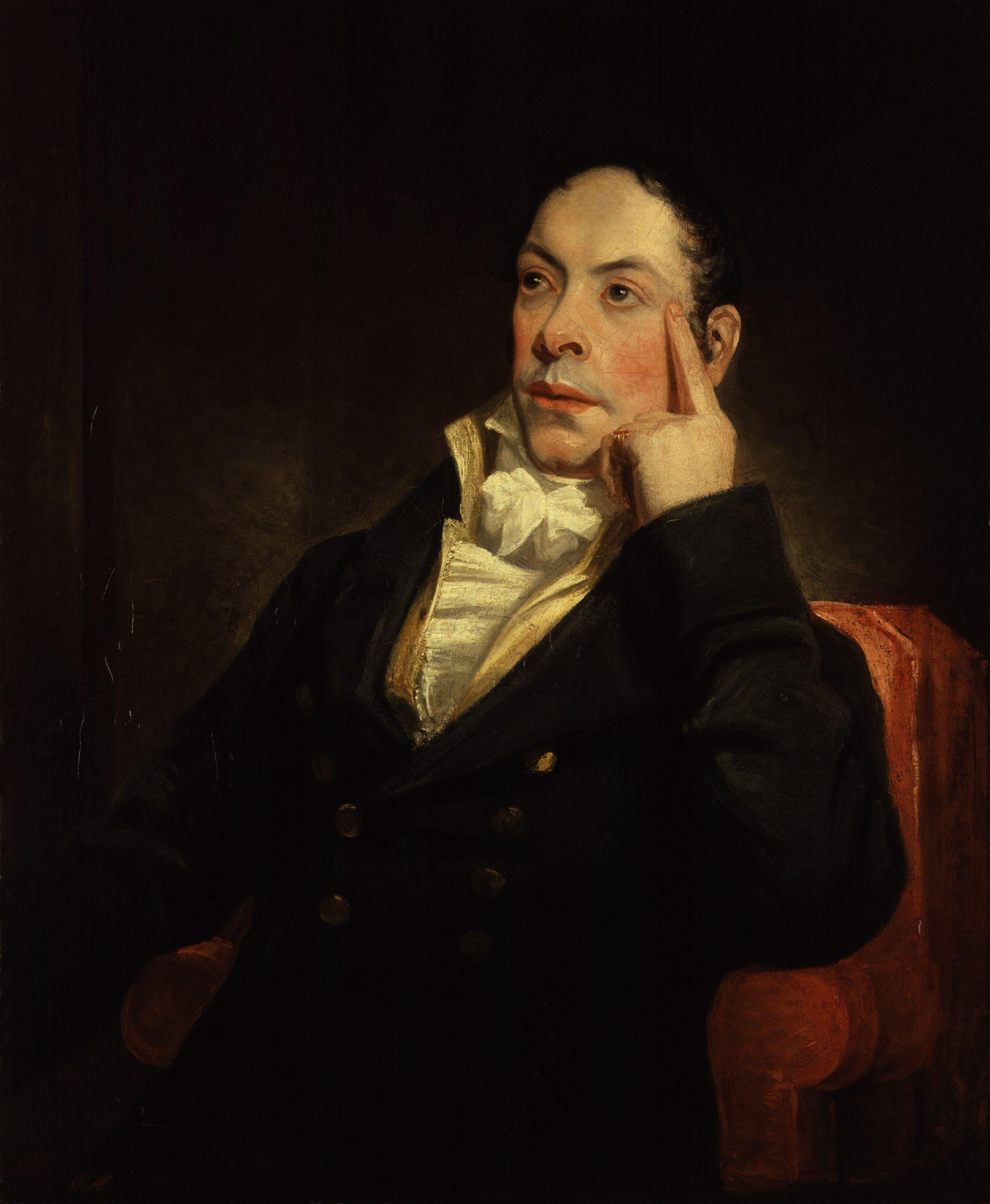
Matthew Gregory Lewis, 1809

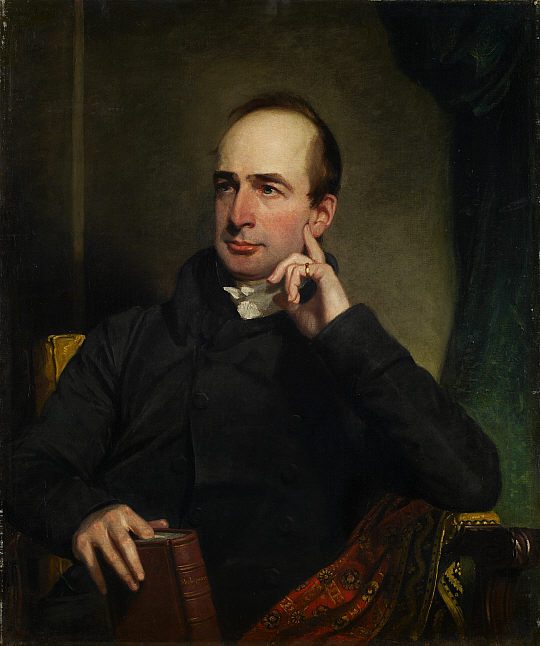
Daniel Terry, 1813

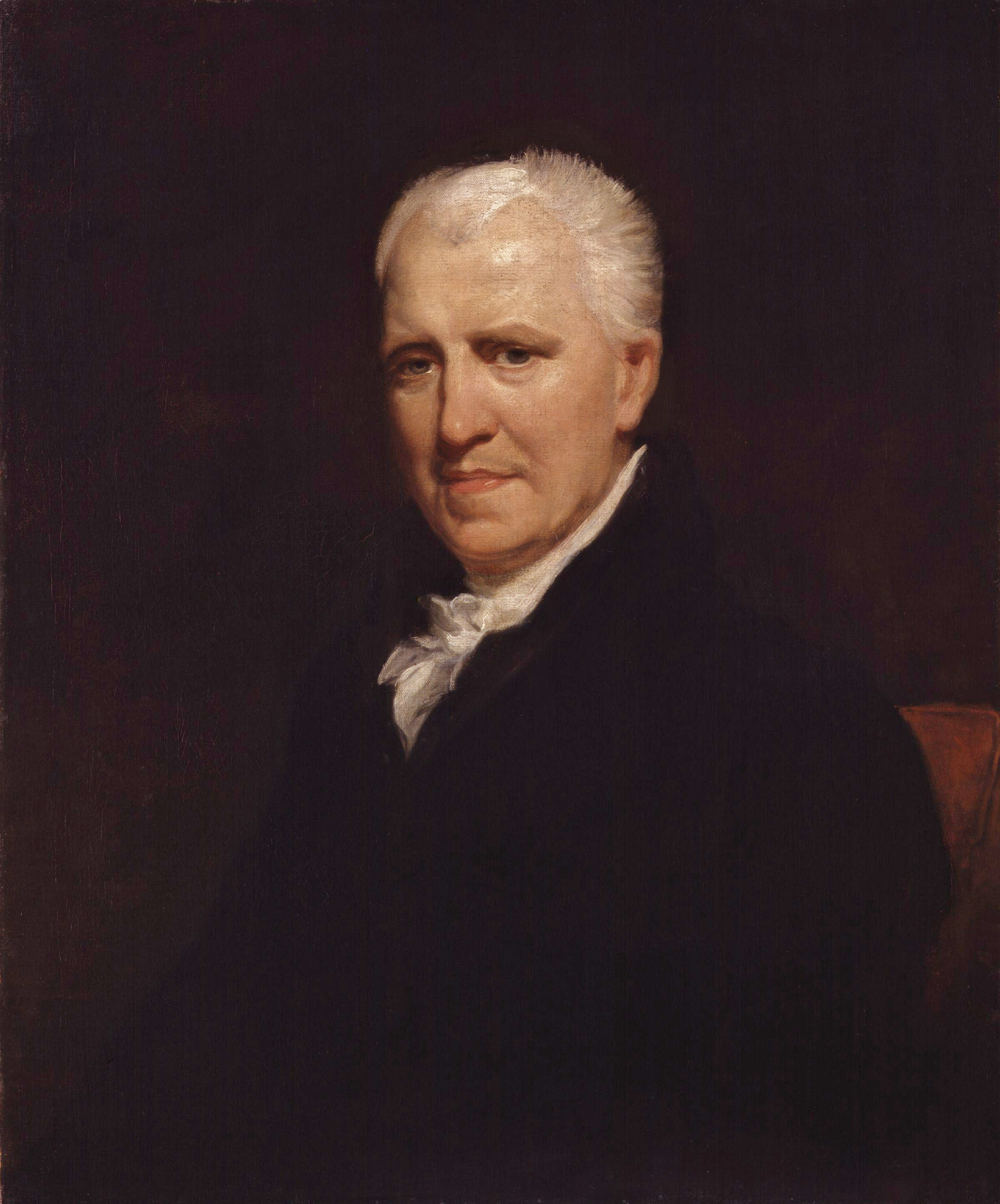
George Crabbe, 1818

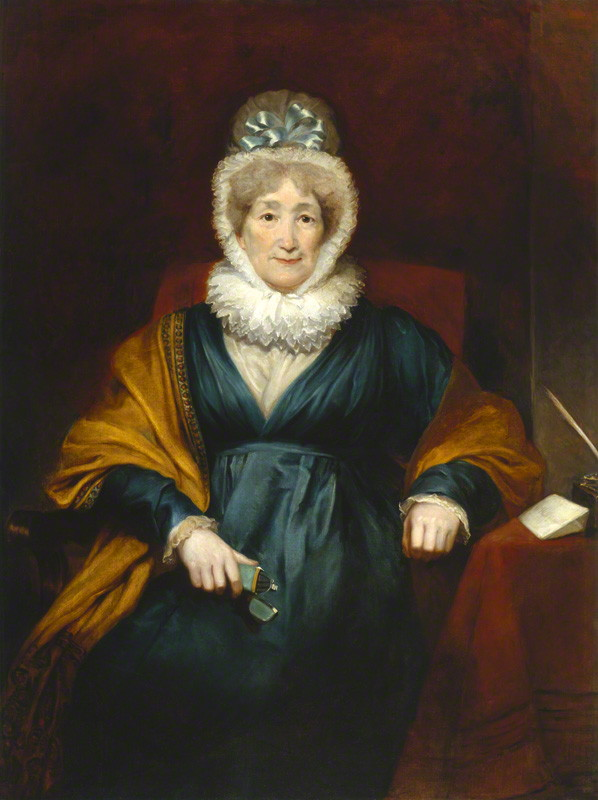
Portrait of Hannah More, 1821

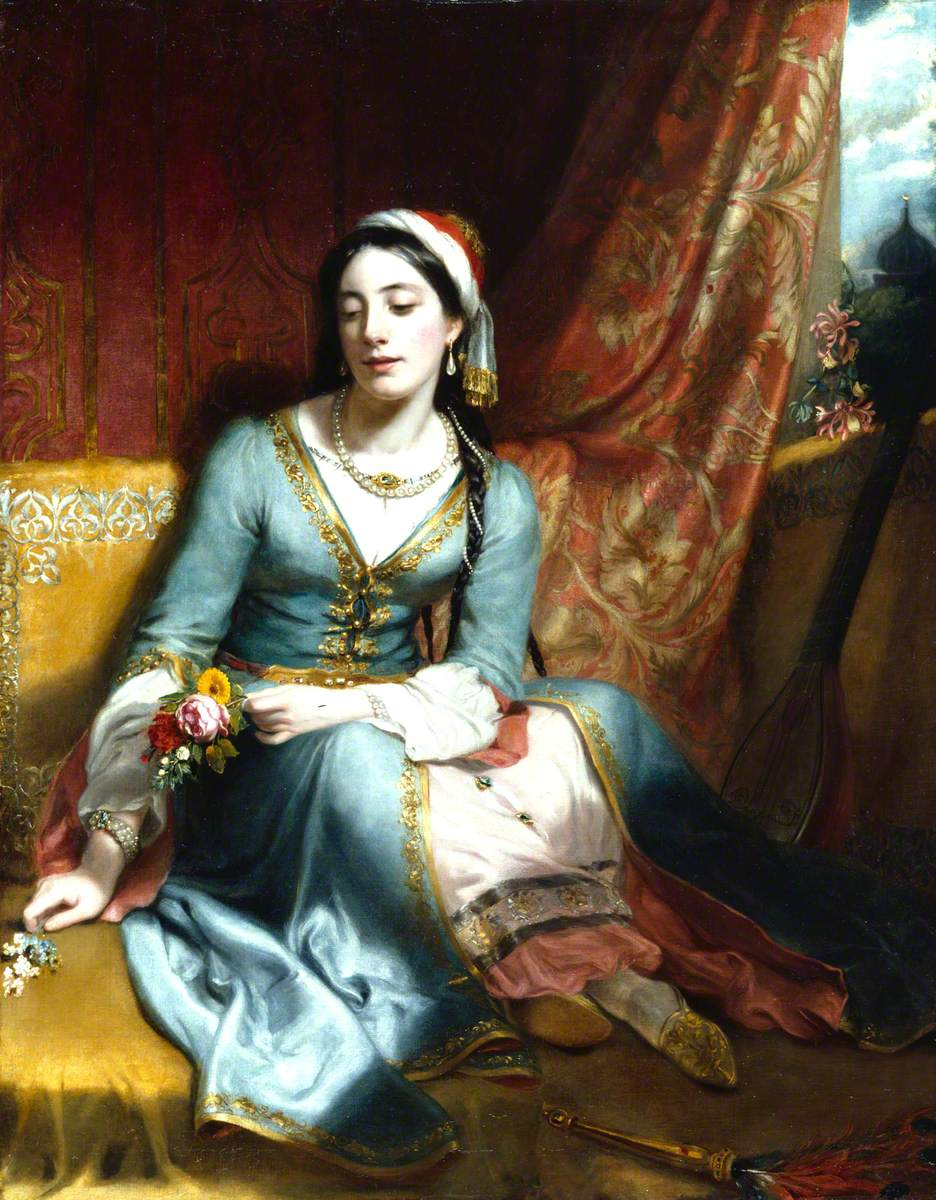
The Oriental Love Letter, 1824

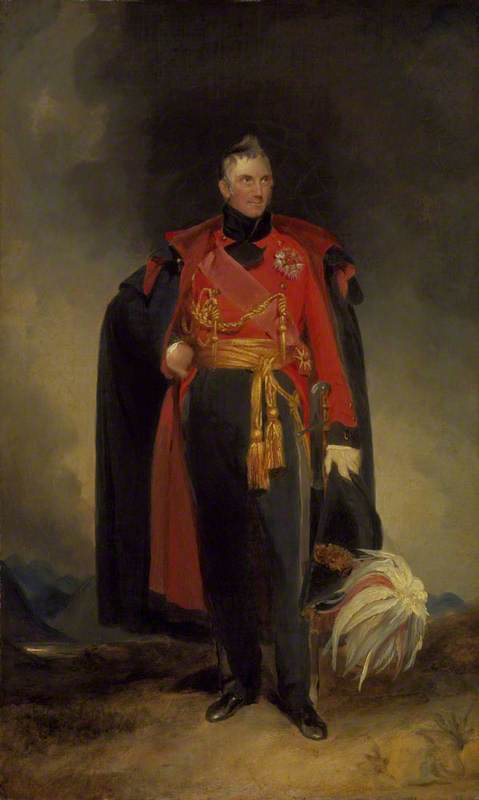
George Murray, 1825

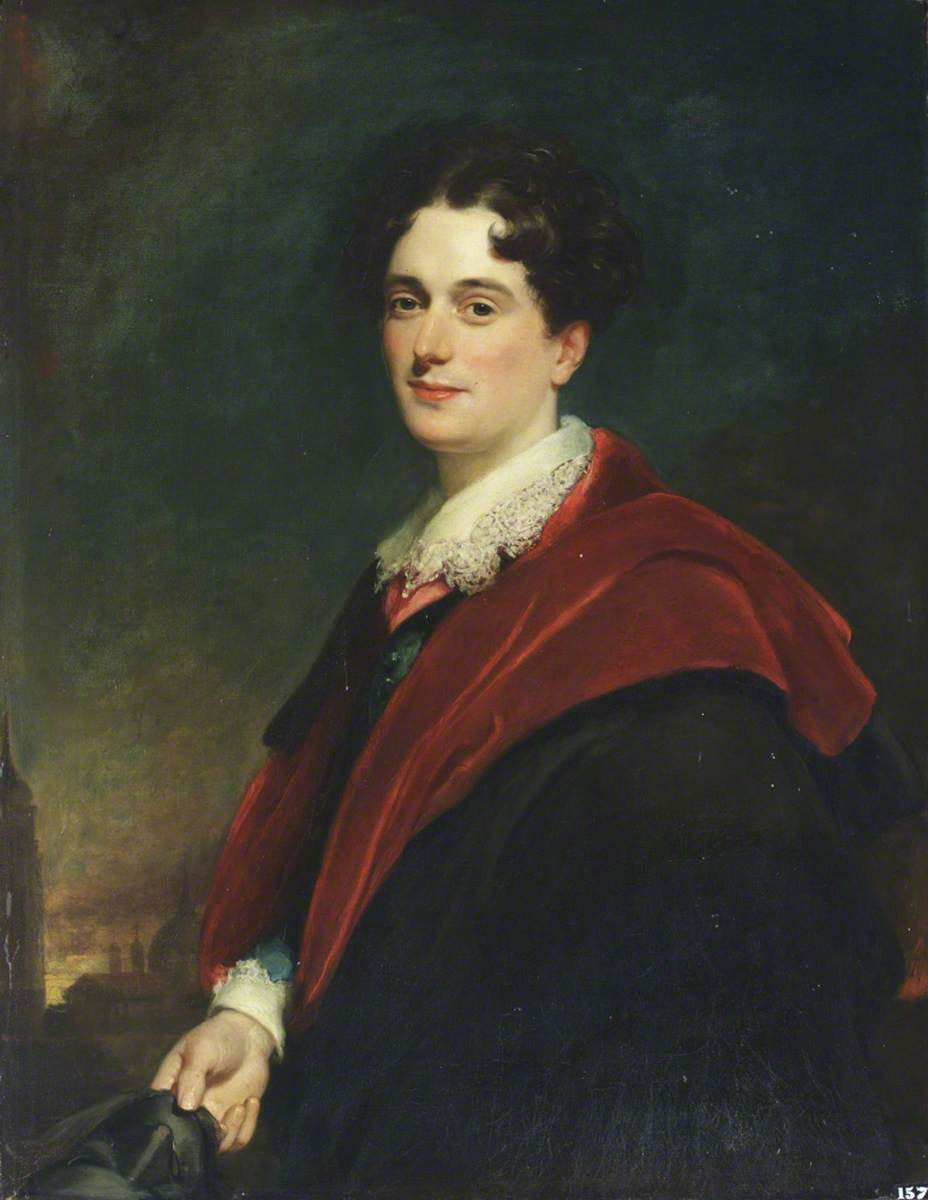
Sir Jacoby Astley, 1826

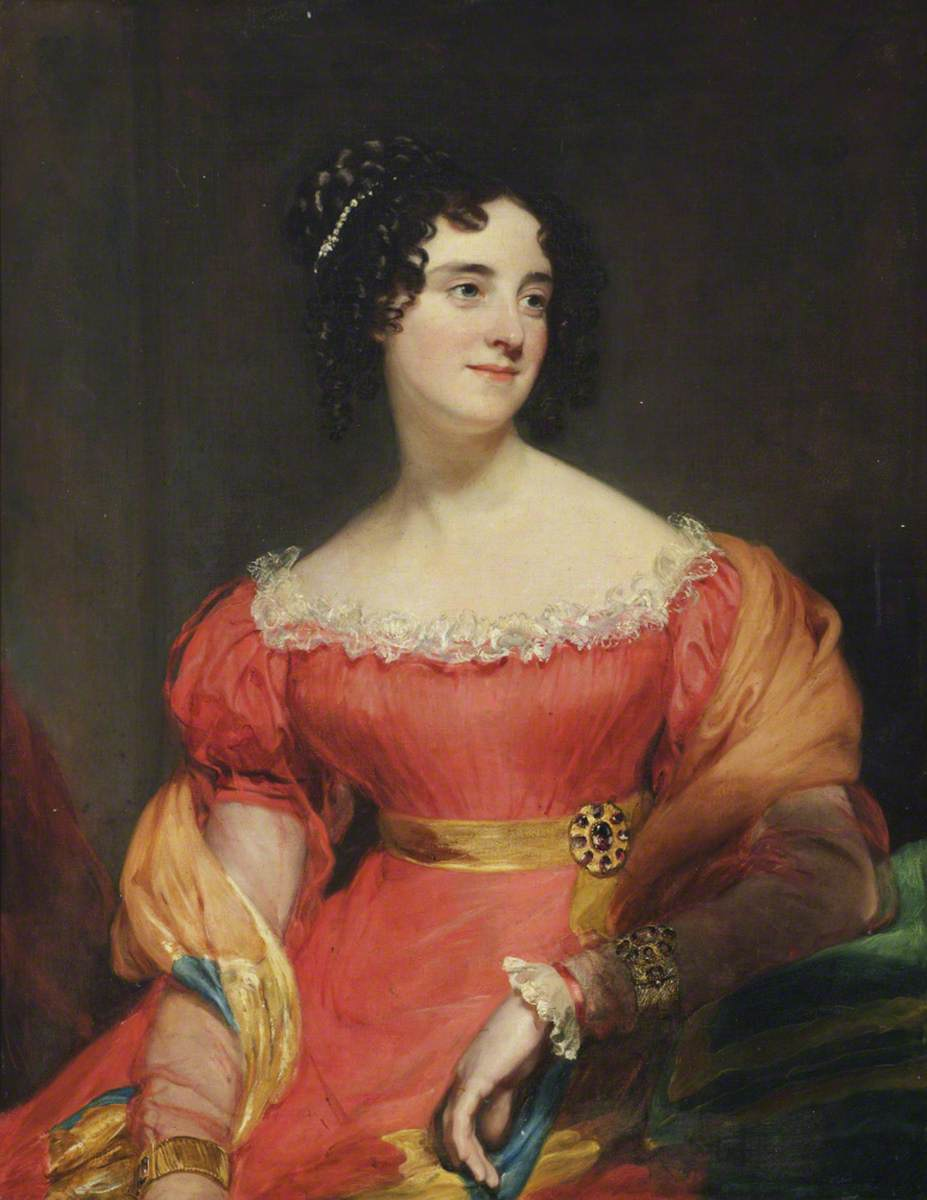
Lady Astley, 1826

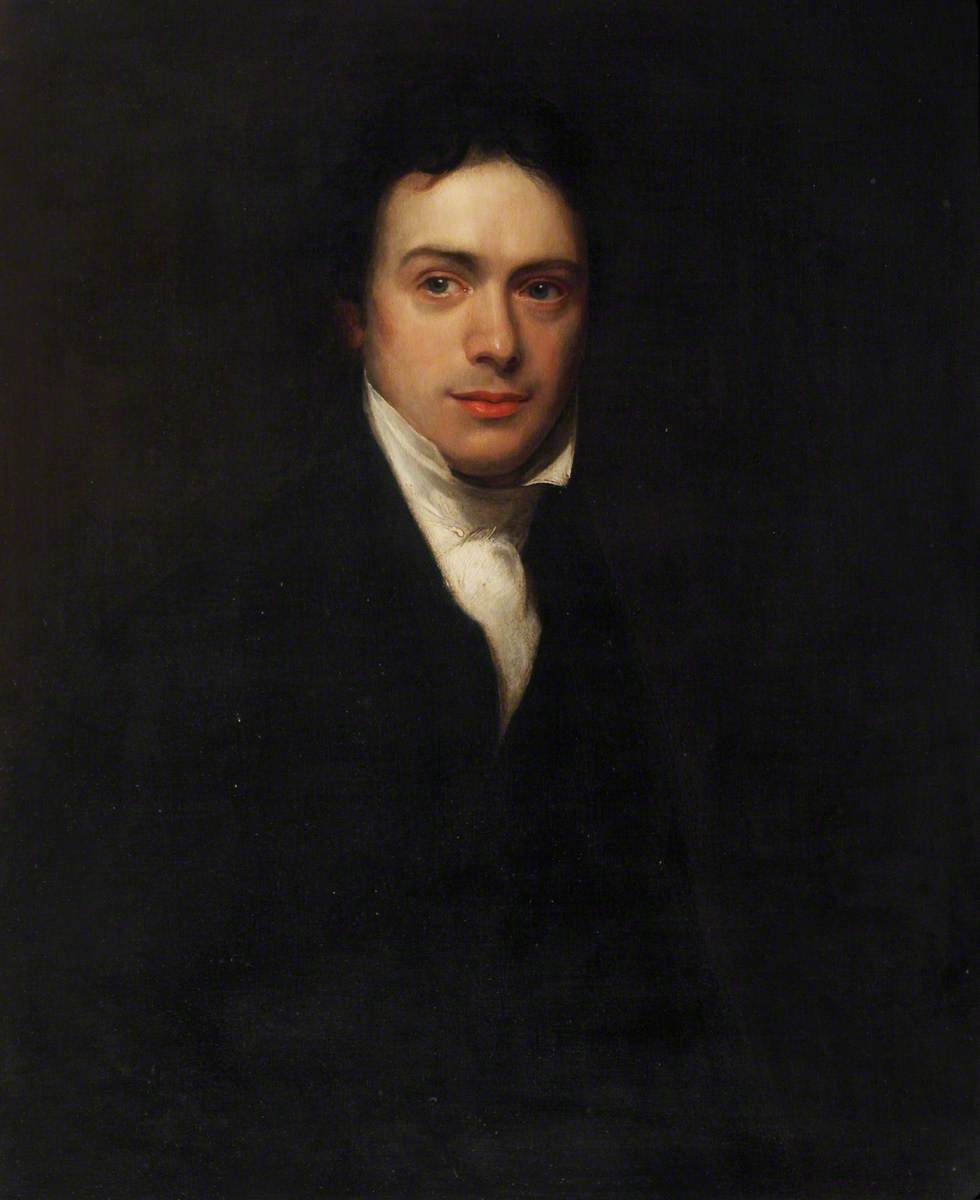
Michael Faraday, c.1826

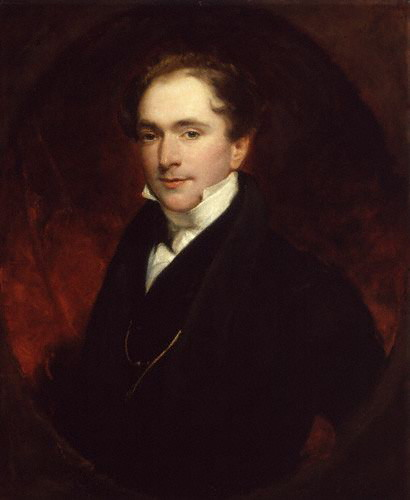
John Poole, 1827

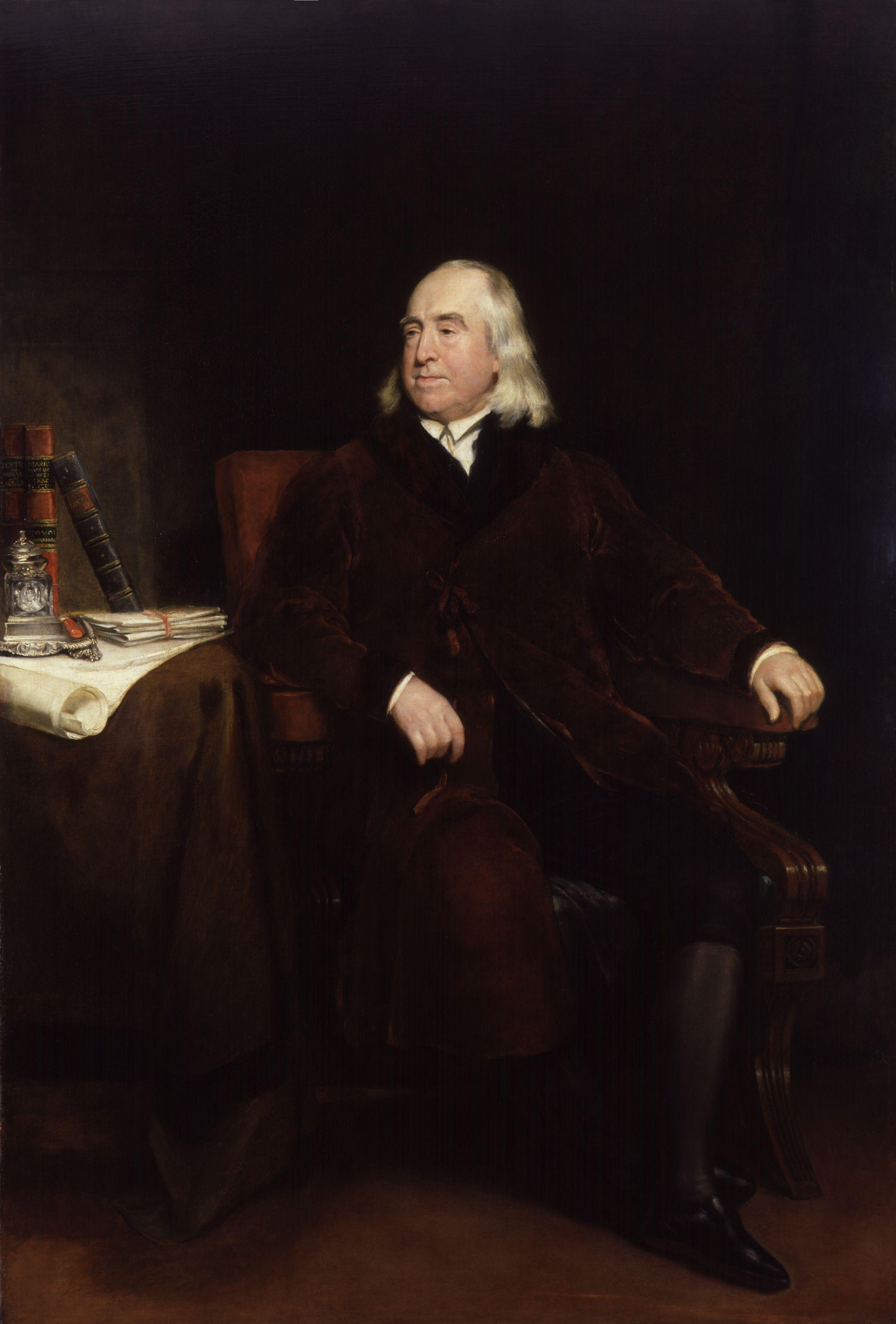
Jeremy Bentham, 1829

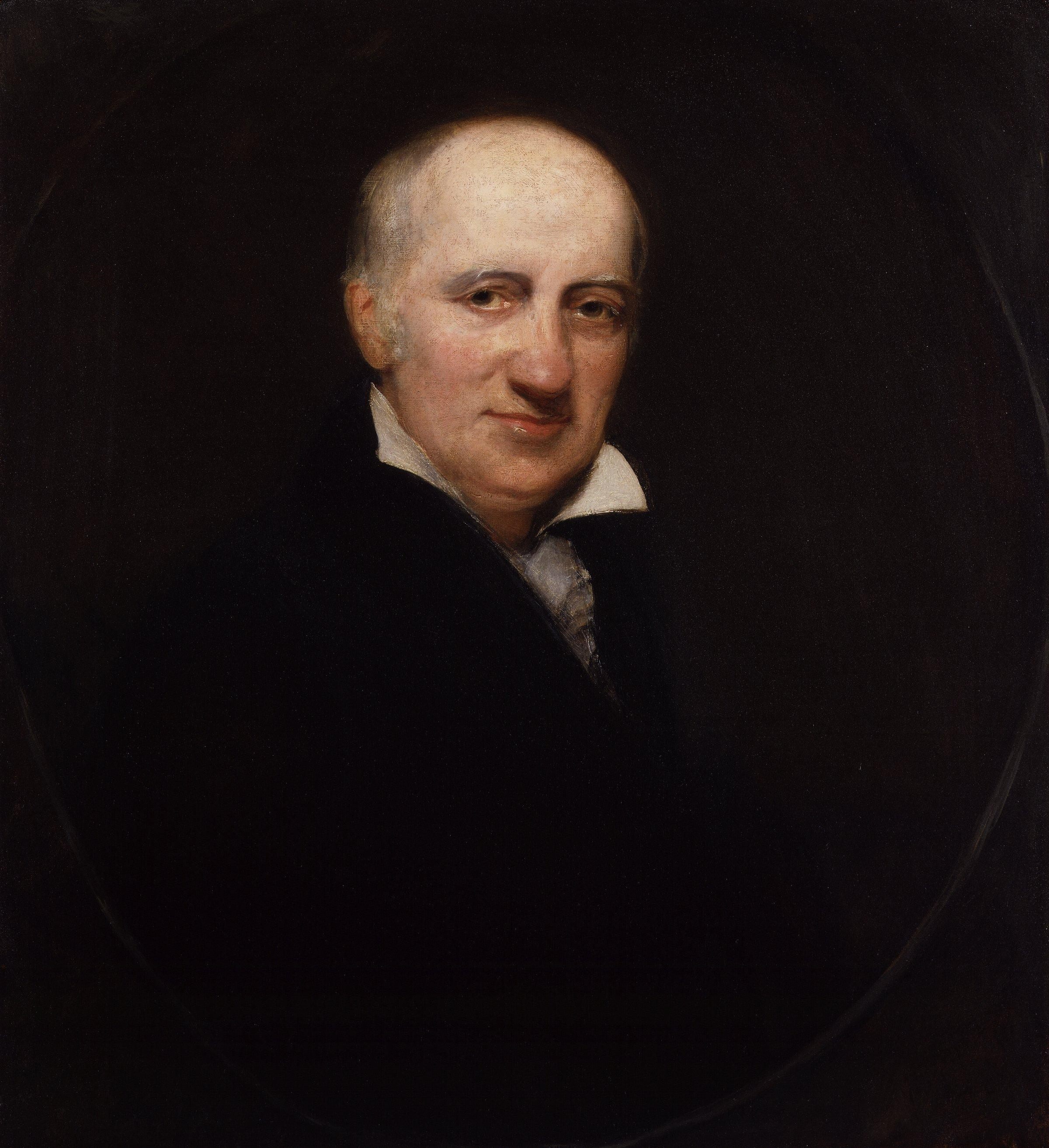
William Godwin, 1830

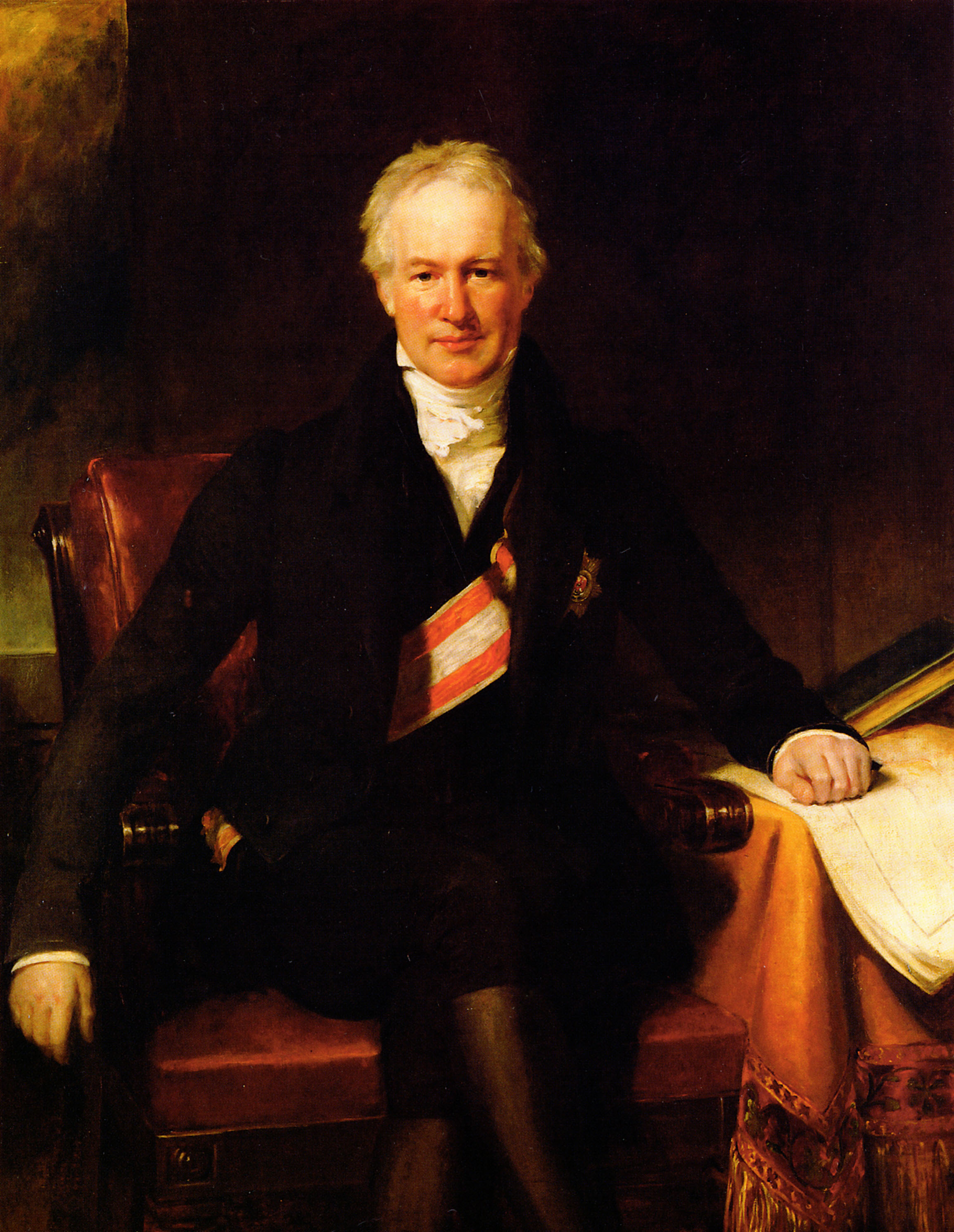
Alexander von Humboldt, 1831

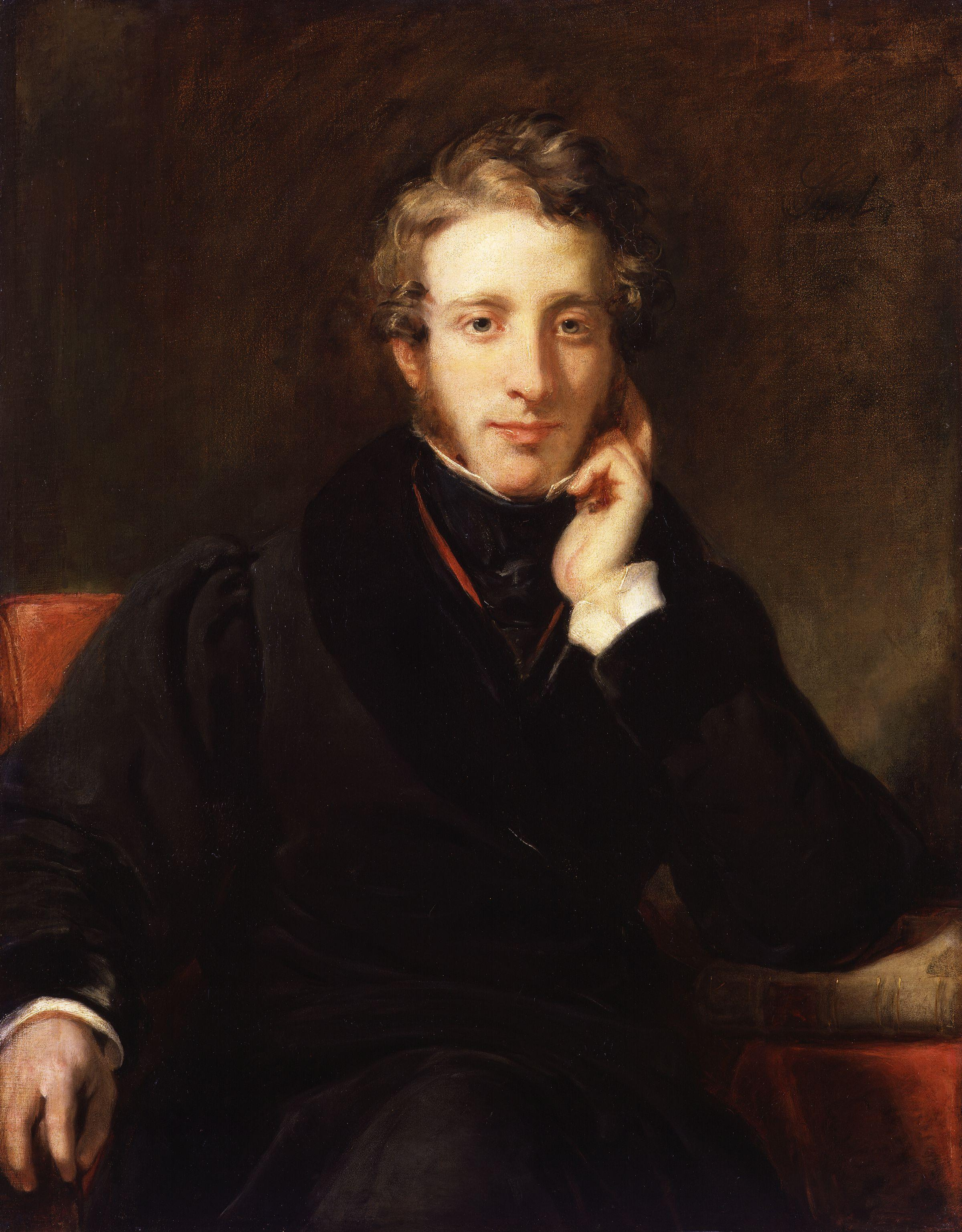
Portrait of Edward Bulwer-Lytton, 1831

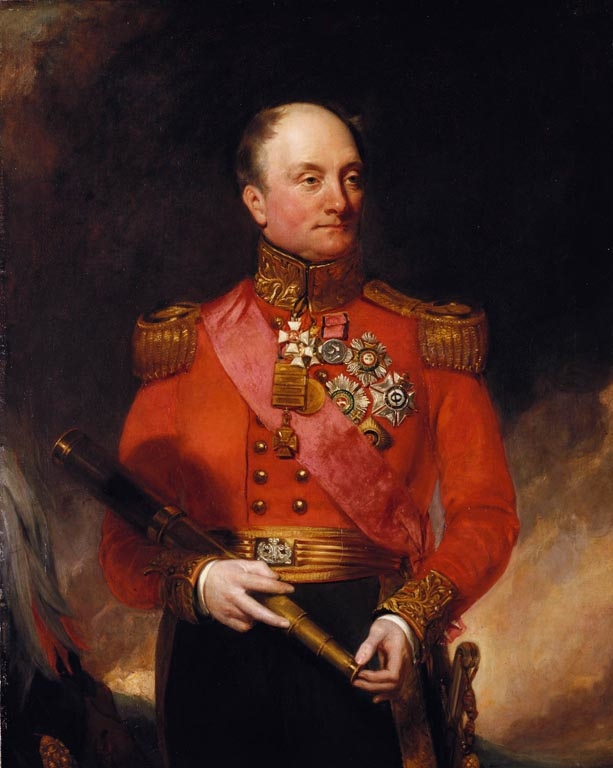
Viscount Hill, c.1835

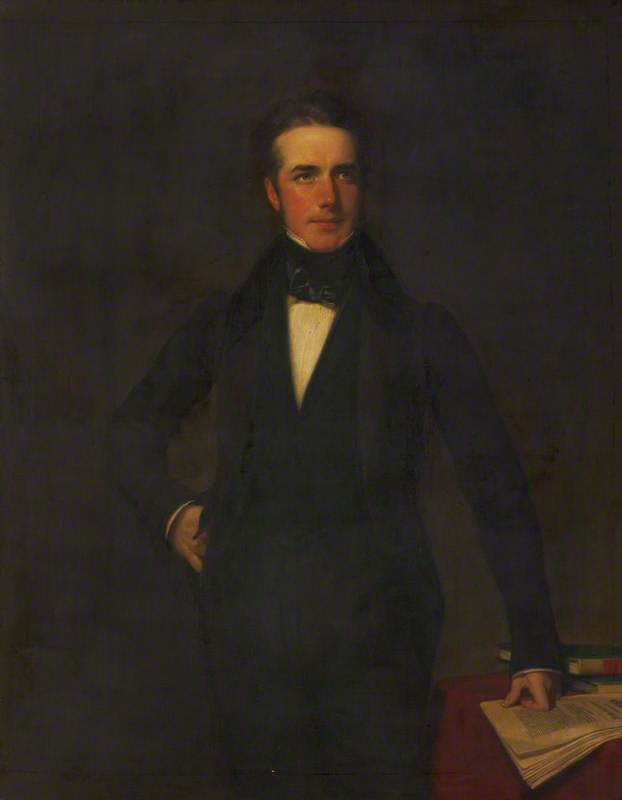
Thomas Drummond, c.1835

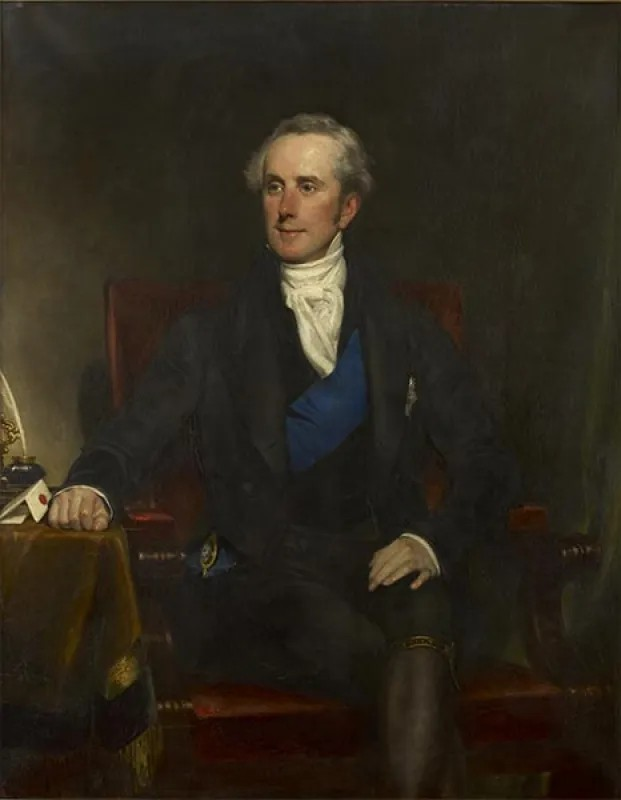
Duke of Newcastle, 1835

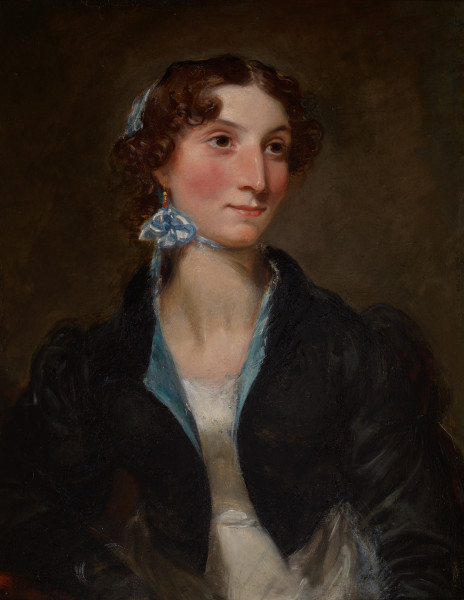
Charlotte Mardyn, 1836

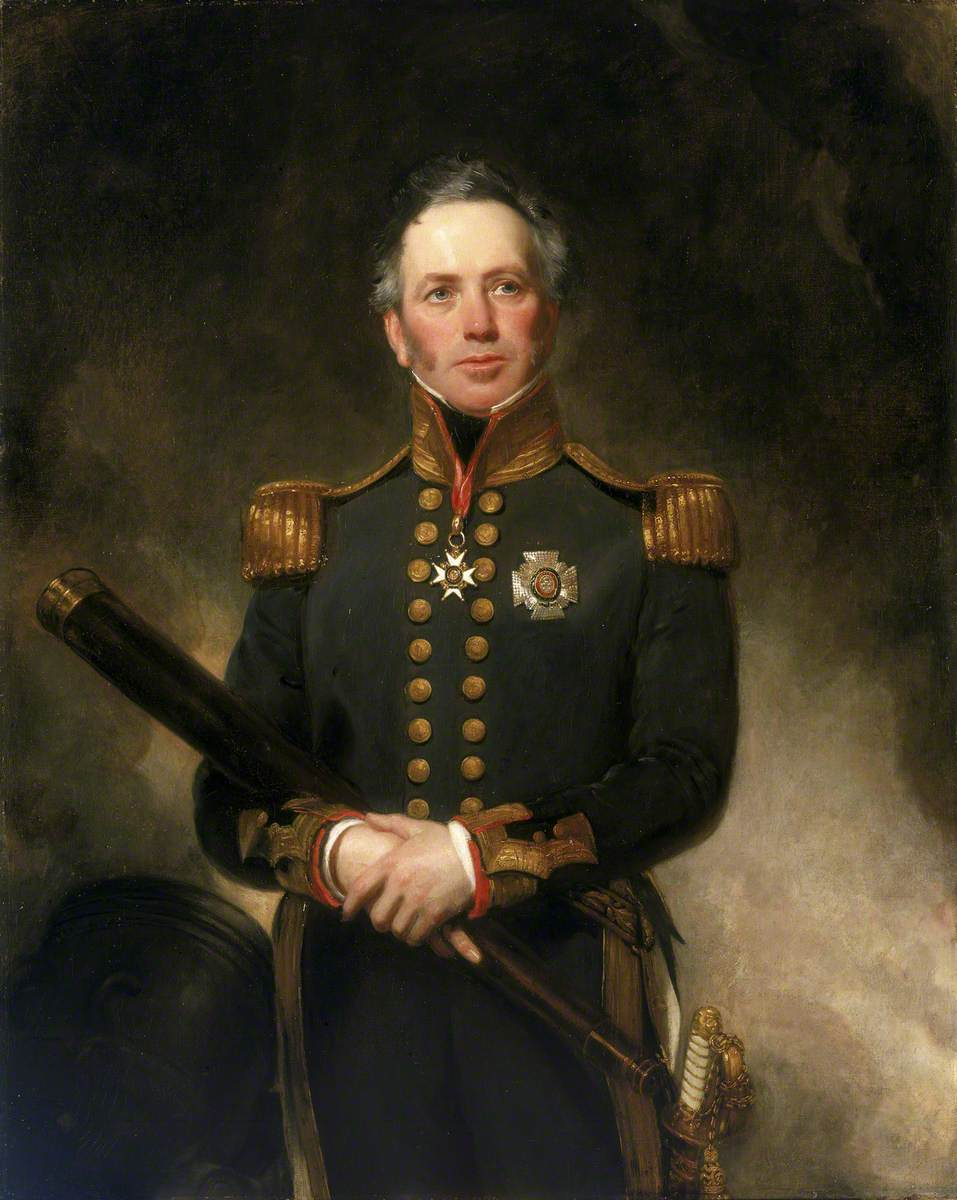
Edward Brace, 1837

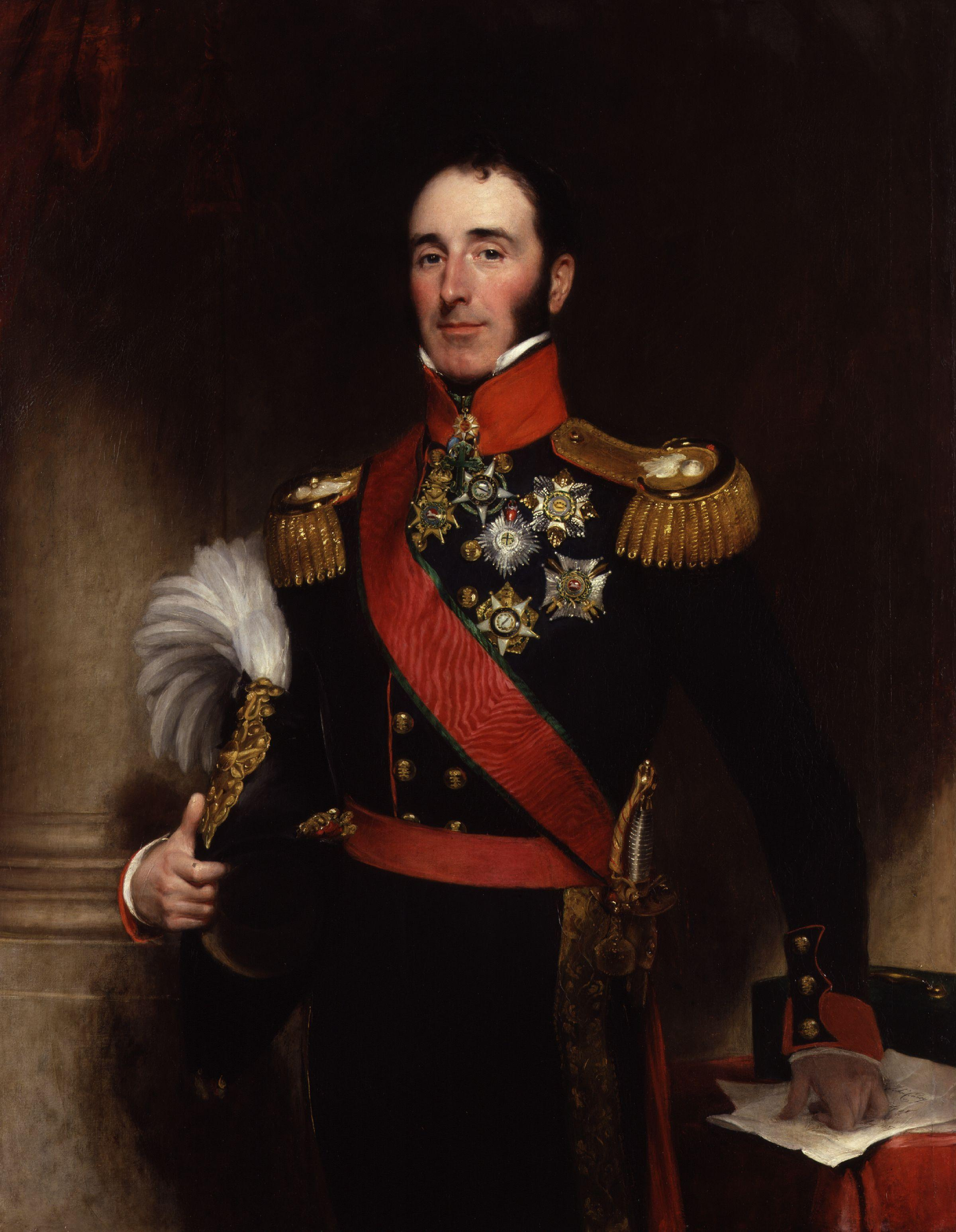
Portrait of John Conroy, 1837

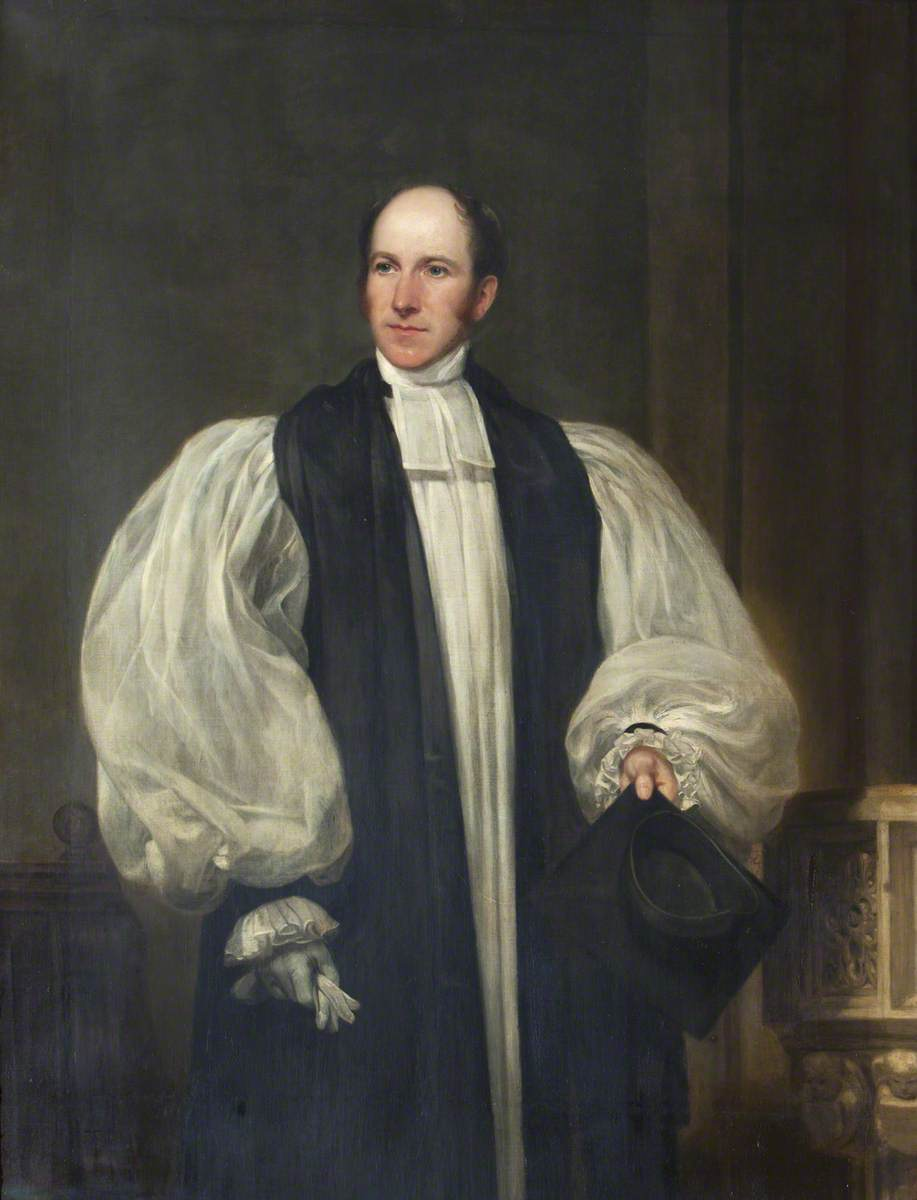
Edward Denison, 1838

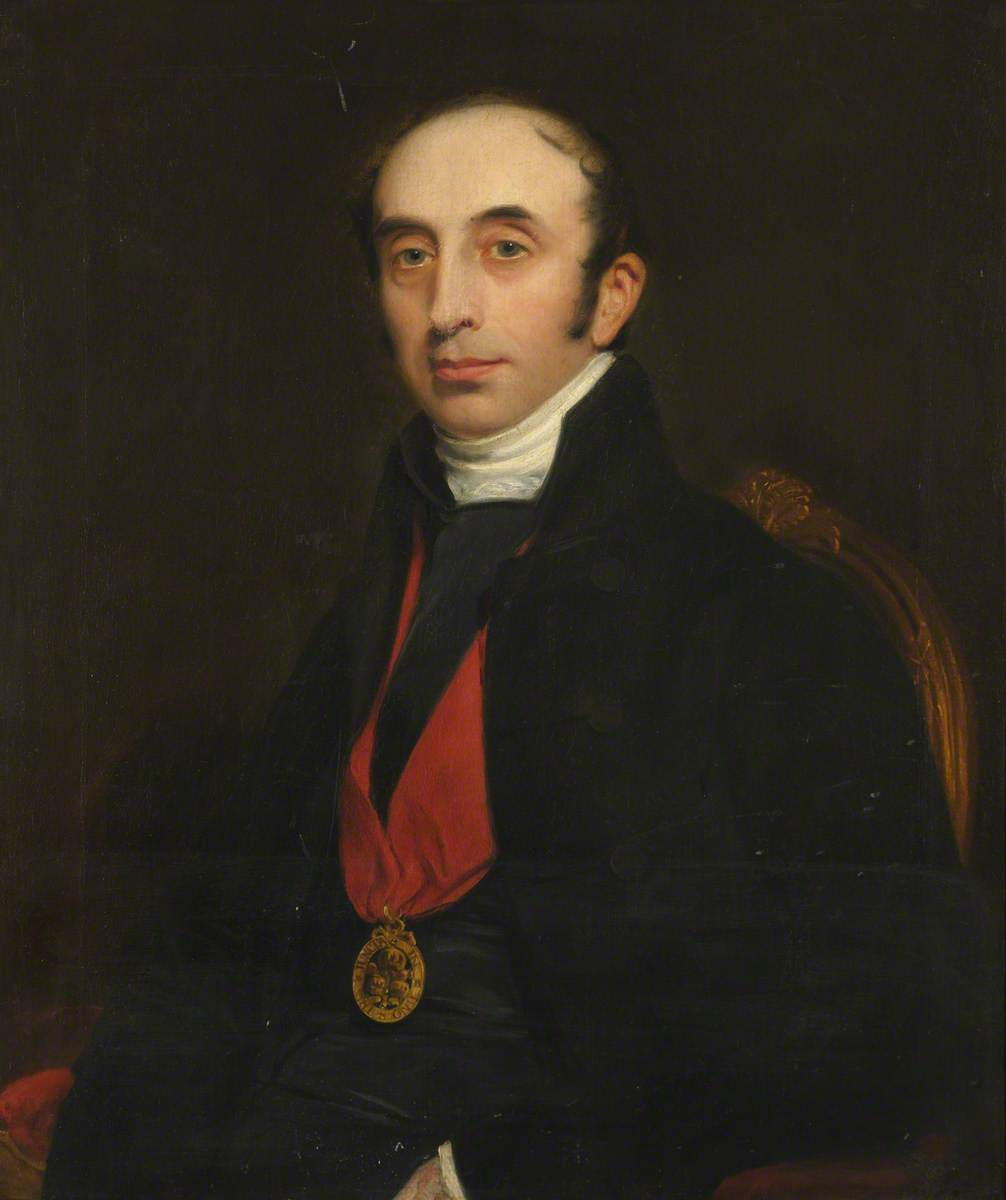
Thomas Turton, 1844

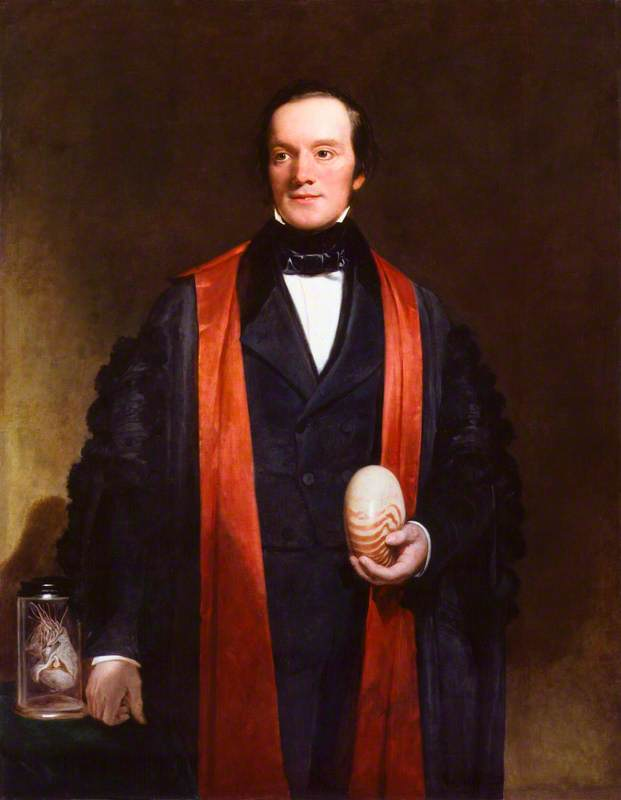
Richard Owen, 1845

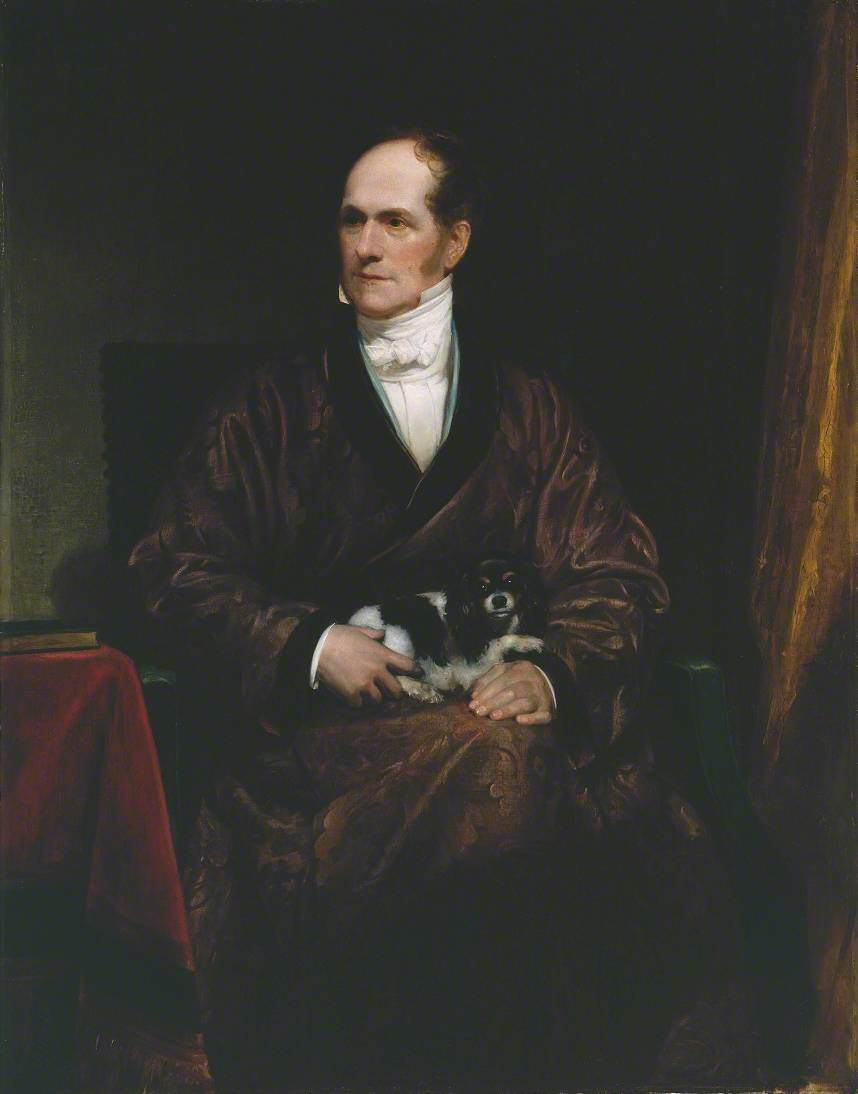
Portrait of Robert Vernon, 1846

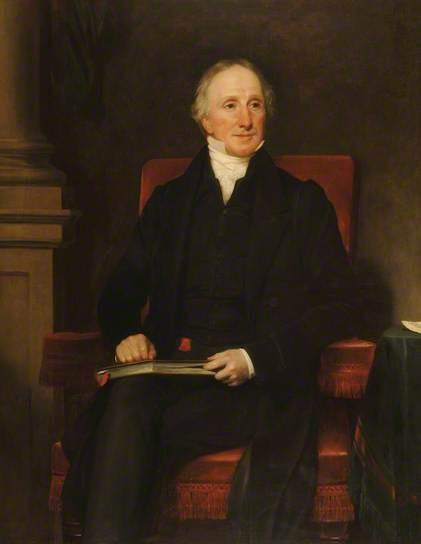
Henry Benjamin Hanbury Beaufoy, 1848

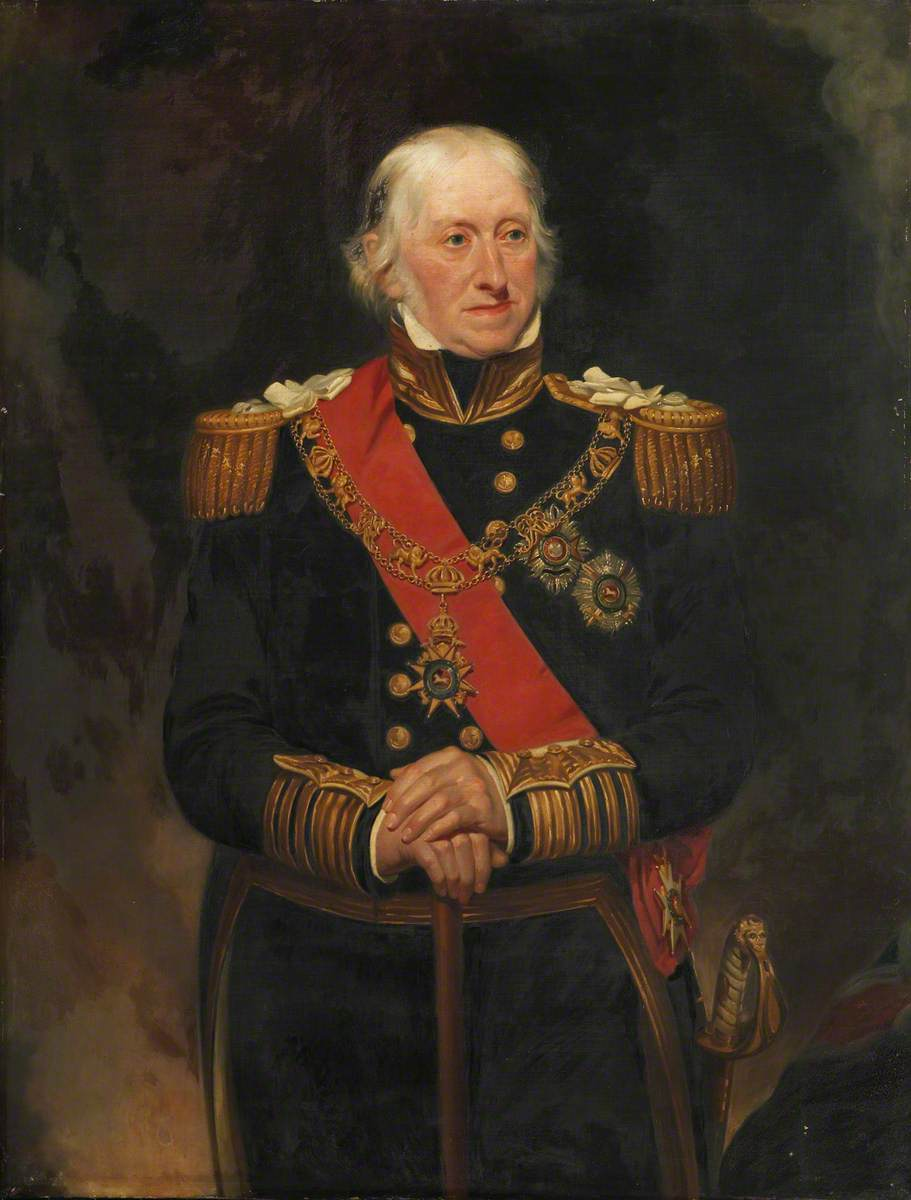
Edward Owen, c.1849

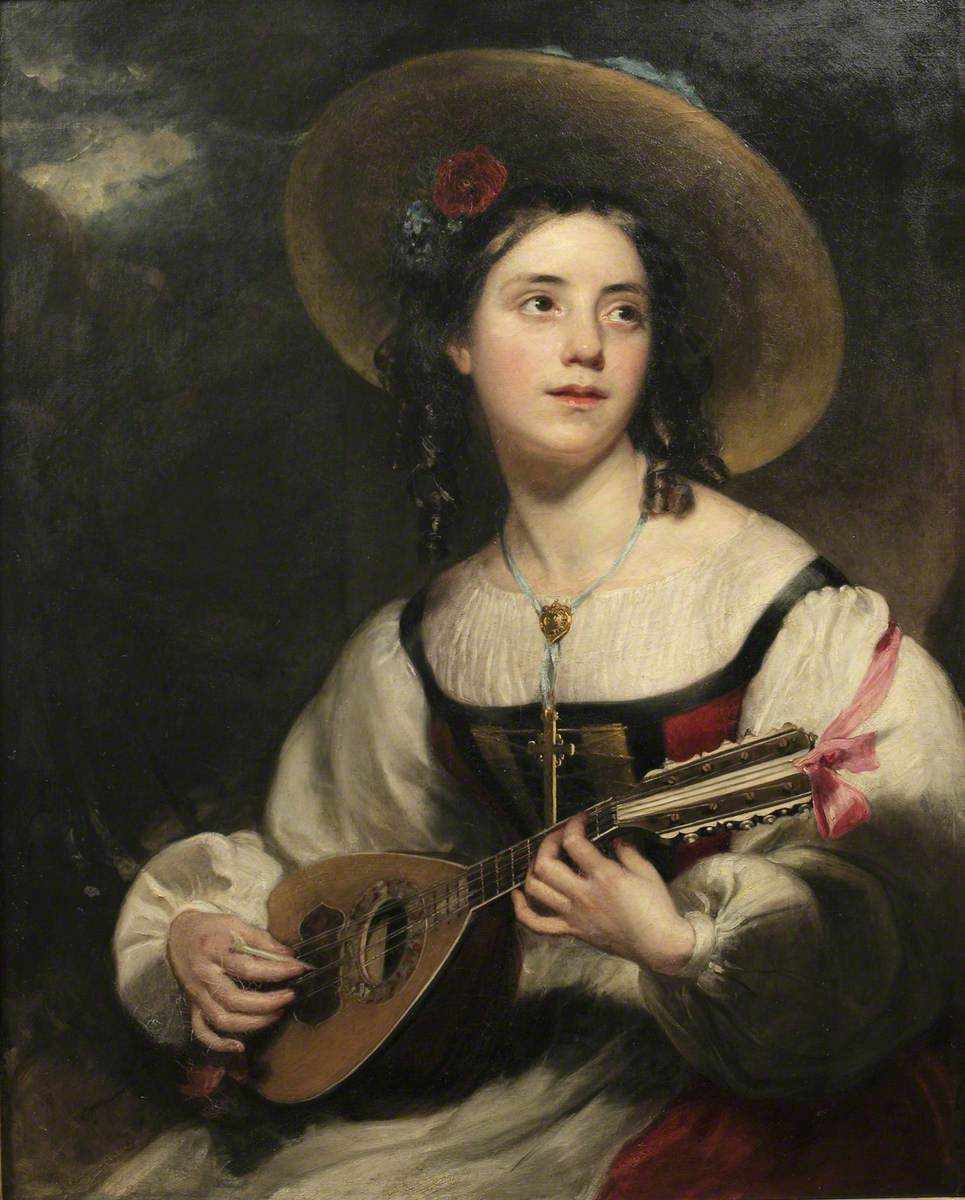
Emily Maria Pickersgill, 1850

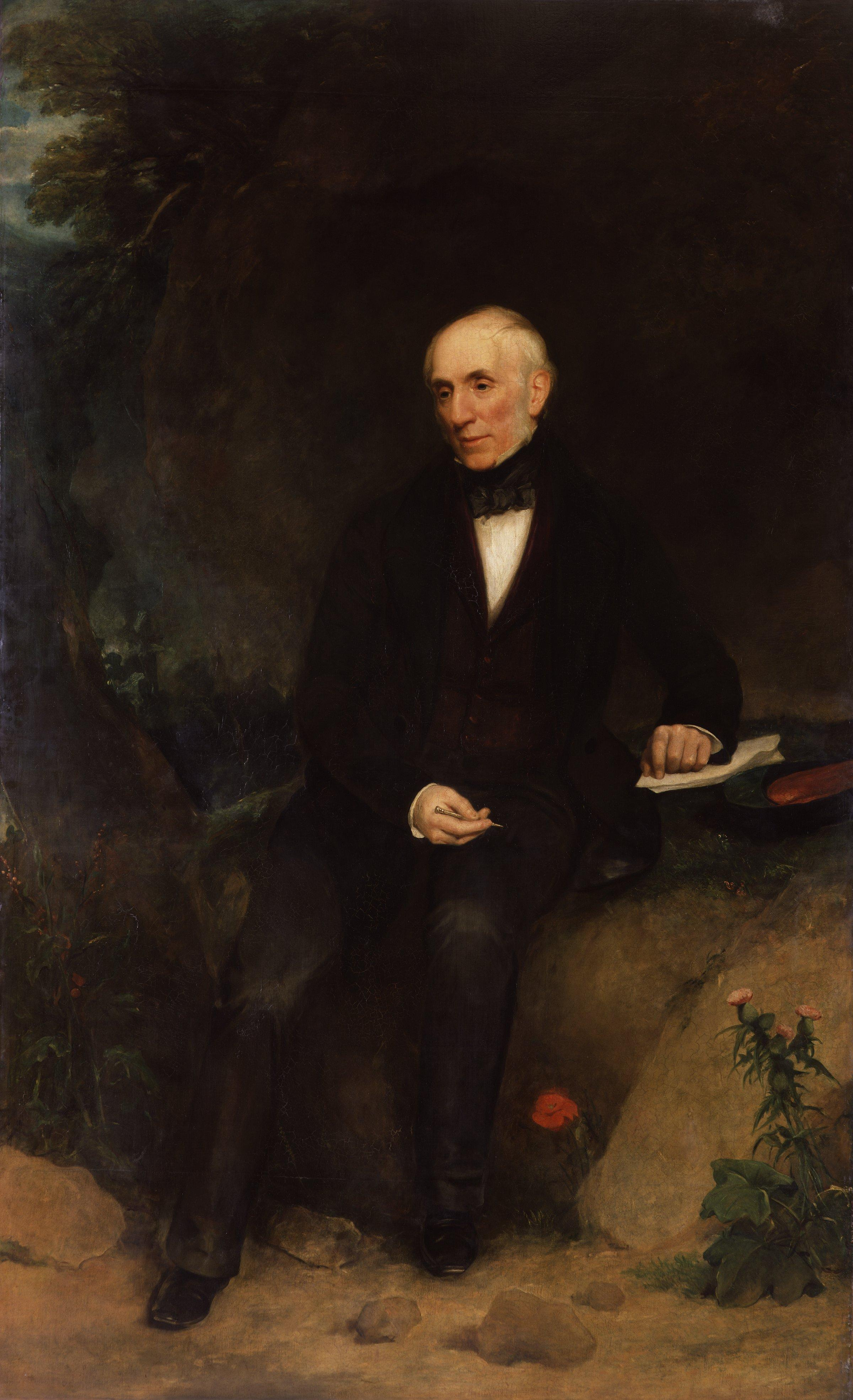
William Wordsworth, 1850

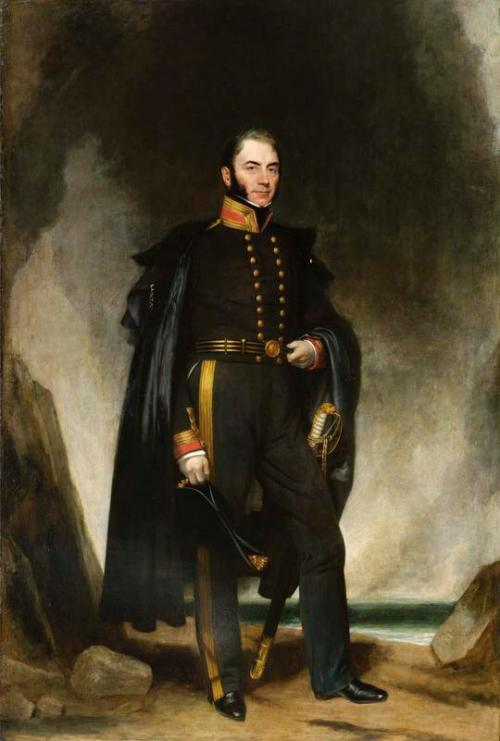
William Gordon, 1854

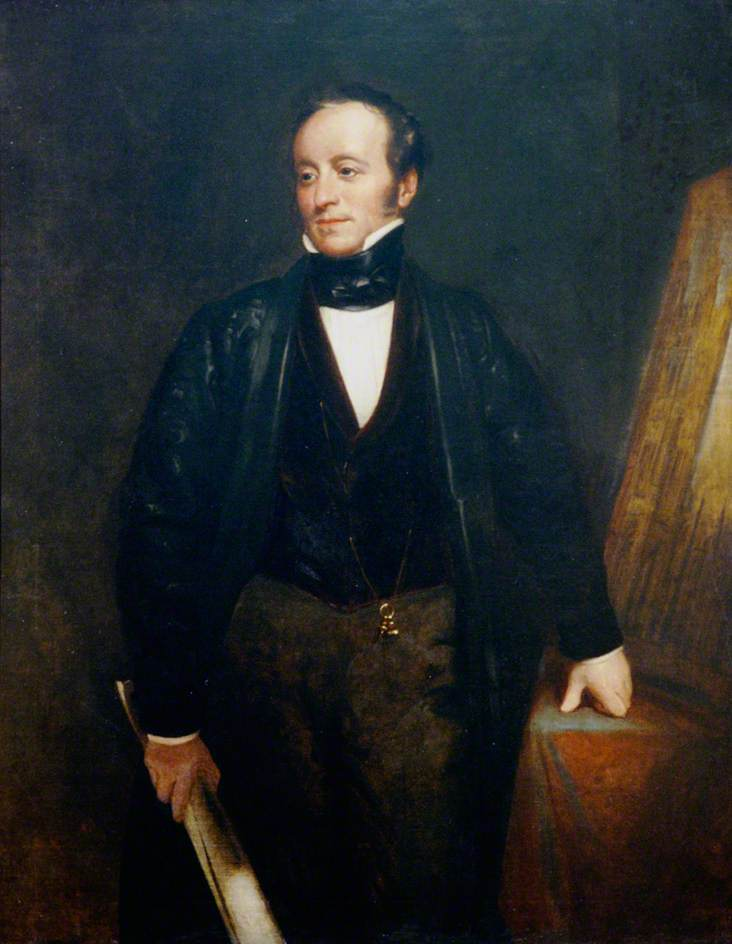
Charles Barry, Unknown date

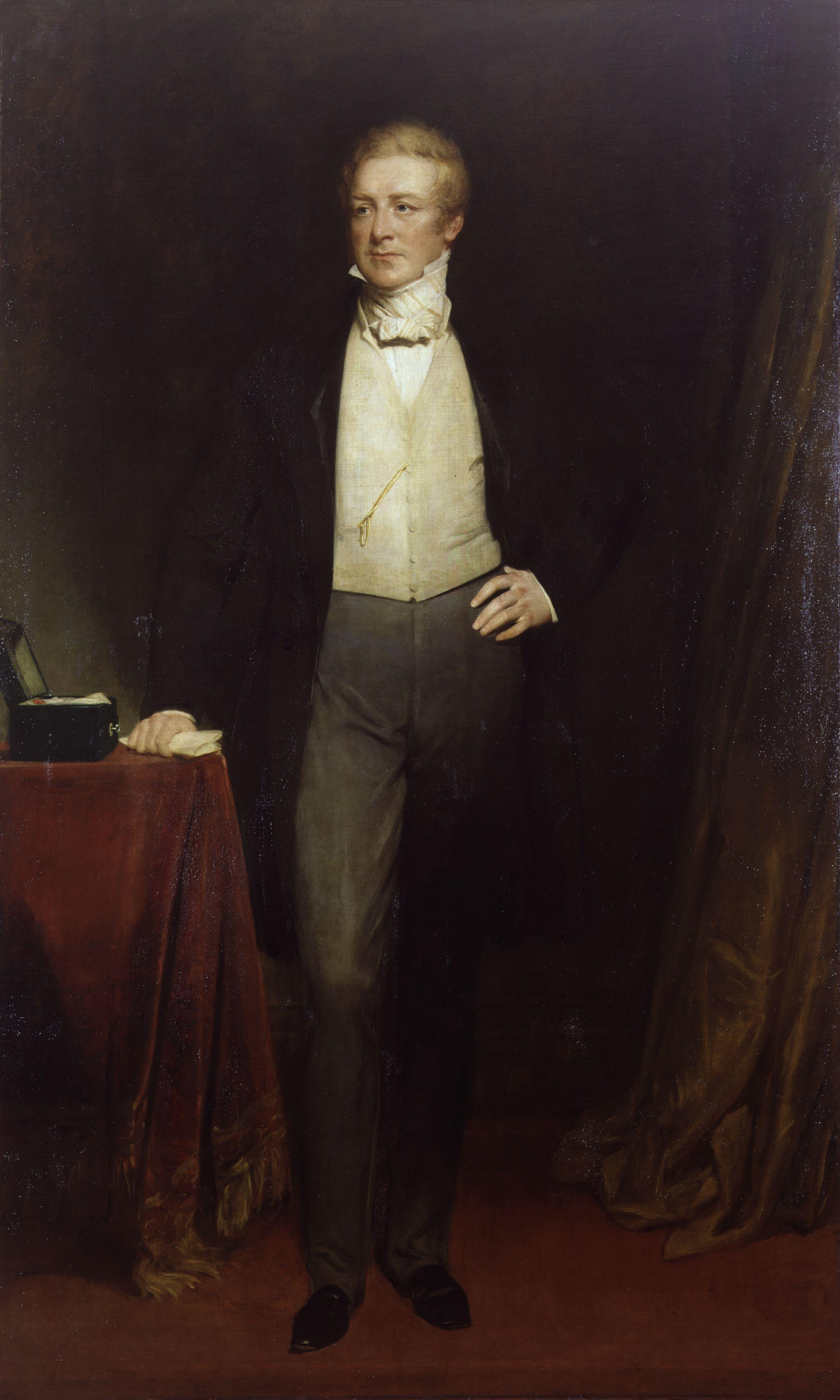
Robert Peel, Unknown date

== See also ==
- List of Orientalist artists
- Orientalism
