= The Bride of Abydos =

Poem written by Lord Byron

- The Bride of Abydos, by Eugène Delacroix (1857), The Louvre, Paris
- Author: Lord Byron
- Language: English
- Genre: Romance/Epic poetry
- Publication date: 1813
- Publication place: United Kingdom

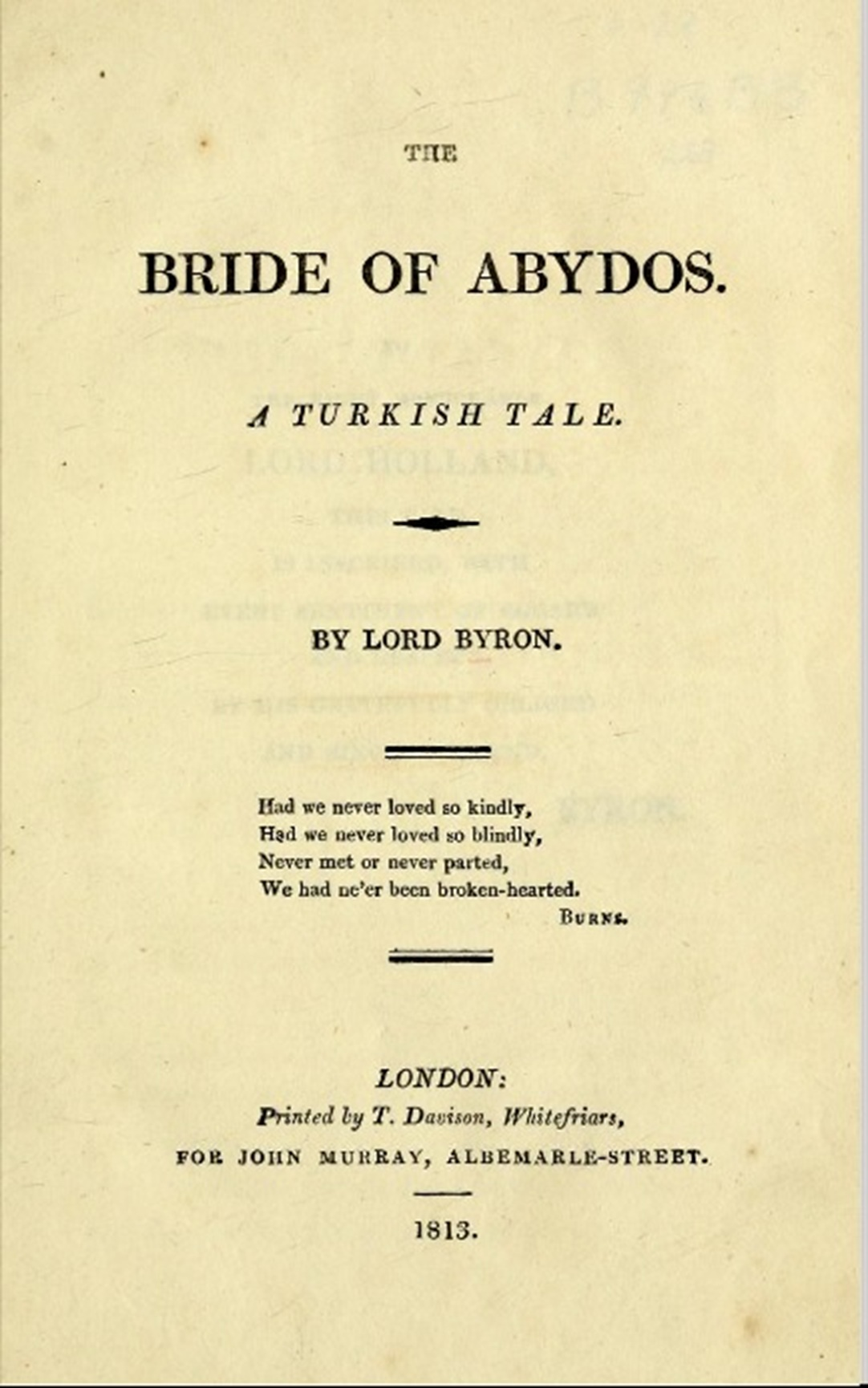
1813 first edition title page. London: John Murray.

The Bride of Abydos is a poem written by Lord Byron in 1813. One of his earlier works, The Bride of Abydos is considered to be one of his "Heroic Poems", along with The Giaour, Lara, The Siege of Corinth, The Corsair and Parisina. These poems contributed to his poetic fame at the time in England.

== Plot ==
Divided into two cantos, and further into more than a dozen stanzas each, The Bride of Abydos has a straightforward plot. After an initial description of the Turkish setting, the story opens with the ruler Giaffir rebuking his supposed son, Selim. Selim professes his love for his half-sister, Zuleika, Giaffir's daughter. Angered, the Pasha refuses Selim a key to the royal harem and upbraids him with insults.

Zuleika herself appears, radiant in beauty, and soon she is forbidden to marry Selim; she tacitly complies. Later, she exclaims her love to Selim and mourns her fate that would be without him. He, in turn, decries Giaffir's judgment as well and vows vengeance. The first canto closes as Zuleika notices a change in Selim's demeanour and wonders about his evasive language. He comforts her with the knowledge that he still retains the harem key and promises to reveal himself later that night.

The second canto again opens with a chthonic description of the Turkish lands and the grotto where the lovers meet. His cloak thrown aside, Selim is dressed as a dashing pirate and declares that Zuleika is not his sister. She is surprised and listens as Selim relates how Giaffir had killed Abdallah, Selim's father and Giaffir's brother. Selim's story continues as he tells her that he learned of his true identity from one of his father's loyal servants, Haroun, and that since Selim himself was raised by Giaffir, he was detested and maltreated.

He became a pirate so that he could gather a posse for revenge, and asserts his lust for Giaffir's blood; the silence at the end of Selim's tale is interrupted by the reports of weapons belonging to Giaffir's men. Selim, wishing to kiss his love one last time, tarries to leave the cave and soon falls, dying on the beach, the fatal blow administered by Giaffir himself. The second canto thus ends with Zuleika dying of sorrow for Selim, while Giaffir is forced to live out the rest of his life in solitude.

== Publication ==
Byron wrote The Bride of Abydos at the age of 25, and published it on 2 December 1813. In a letter to a friend, he himself notes the nature of its composition "for the sake of employment". In his personal Diary of 16 November 1813, Byron claims to have written The Bride "stans pede in uno" (a direct quotation (Note: The literal meaning is "standing on one foot"; it is unclear exactly what Horace meant by this originally, but the usual interpretation is that it was an idiom for "writing quickly and carelessly" (and so, presumably, poorly)—although some have argued for a scatological implication.) from Horace's Satires 2.10, decrying the rapid production of poor verse for commercial gain). Byron, however hastily he wrote, returned and revised The Bride many times. Nevertheless, the manuscript tradition reveals only minor tweaks to the poem. In another letter Byron expresses his intent to concoct an illicit love affair between the true brother and sister, but he settled on its final format before actually penning the story.

== Style ==
The verse structure in The Bride of Abydos has its critics and champions. The majority of the lines are in octosyllabic couplets, but Byron manages to incorporate various other rhyme schemes as well as meters, including heroic couplets and anapests. Because the plot of The Bride is rather simple when compared to his other works at the time, Byron experiments with the meter and language. However, some declare this experiment to be a failure; Paul West, in Byron: The Spoiler's Art, notes the inherent awkwardness between the stresses of the speech and the counts of the line. He cites the following passage as an example of this inability of the stress to correctly align:

Zuleika, mute and motionless,
Stood like that statue of distress,
When, her last hope for ever gone,
The mother harden'd into stone;
All in the maid that eye could see
Was but a younger Niobé.

— from Canto the Second, section xxii (lines 491–496)

== Characters ==
Inasmuch as the meter is varied and experimental, the characters in The Bride of Abydos are of a simple stock. There are four characters, Giaffir and Zuleika, the former an embodiment for death and destruction, the other for love, and Selim and Haroun, both balanced in death and love, the former party to both while Haroun is to neither.

Selim's revelation of his true identity separates the two cantos down these lines. Giaffir constantly berates Selim on his lack of warlike prowess, and Selim is quiet and does not clash with the Pasha; thus Selim is solely the lover in the first canto, paired with Zuleika. However, he changes before her: "This morn I saw thee gentlest, dearest, / But now thou'rt from thyself estranged" (I.385-86). And so as the pirate, desiring more for revenge than to be safe and alive with Zuleika, the character is now paired with the death and destruction of Giaffir.

Haroun, the fourth, a eunuch, is neither a lover in the harem to which he has the key, nor is he a fighter, for he does not join Selim in vengeance against Giaffir. He is only a catalyst, aiding Selim's transformation into a fighter by arming him with the nature of his true identity, without which Selim would be impotent.

A fourth voice is also presented; the narrator is a mostly impersonal, omniscient, third-person entity and "is nothing more than a standard storytelling device". The voice records the drama and supplies the interior motives and monologues without pretense, explaining in a few cases exterior allusions, "but, generally within the body of the poem is sparing in offering truly informative commentary".

== Themes ==
Most readily, this poem is read as a love story between Selim and Zuleika. The narrator, too, fashions the work in such a style, establishing the characters first in their relations to each other romantically, following the two lovers as a cohesive character unit for some time, and finally explaining the rest of the plot themes (e.g. revenge and manhood) with respect to the more central aspect of love. Nevertheless, even the characters themselves refuse to support such a traditional love-story structure; indeed, Zuleika is wholly in love with Selim, denying her father and every external pressure on her love while imploring Selim to do the same, but her lover himself cannot focus on love. Although he is the featured "lover" character of the tale, Selim does not choose love above all else, considering himself principled on the themes of filial piety and revenge.

One author finds the refusal of Selim to heed Zuleika's pleas of love and his turn for vengeance against Giaffir to be "a consistent vision of man's low estate and the futility of Romantic optimism". Again, the initial reaction in reading The Bride of Abydos as a poem of revenge is to understand Selim's motives as they are given by the narrator, namely justice for his murdered father. Rather, Selim's most immediate cause for revenge is his present condition in Giaffir's court, one of unmanliness, another prominent theme in this poem:

What could I be? Proscribed at home,
And taunted to a wish to roam;
And listless left—for Giaffir's fear
Denied the courser and the spear—
Though oft—Oh, Mahomet! how oft!—
In full Divan the despot scoff'd,
As if my weak unwilling hand
Refused the bridle or the brand.
He ever went to war alone,
And pent me here untried, unknown;
To Haroun's care with women left,
By hope unblest, of fame bereft,
While thou—whose softness long endear'd,
Though it unmann'd me, still had cheer'd—
To Brusa's walls for safety sent,
Awaitedst there the field's event.

— from Canto the Second, section xviii (lines 321–336)

to the point that it is Giaffir's mistake to underestimate Selim, the prince is forced to strip himself of a masculine identity to hide in the court. Indeed, until the point of the revelation of his true persona and even spanning until the siege on the beach, the only evidence of Selim's manhood is his relationship with Zuleika. And although a clearly heterosexual affair, it is clandestine to all but the lovers themselves, the narrator, and the audience. To Giaffir and the court for the majority of The Bride of Abydos, Selim is a man with no masculinity.

Inasmuch as the aspect of sexual identity shadows the Selim's relations with Giaffir and his court, certain sexual perversions, namely incest, seemed to run chiefly in the mind of Byron from the very inception of the poem. Byron allows himself to explore the taboos of such love lines in the wild passions of the Orient, away from British sensibilities. Nevertheless, while using such a foreign setting to entertain tale of taboo, the poet also justifies Selim and Zuleika's relations with respect to knowledge of that culture: "[N]one else there could obtain that degree of intercourse leading to general affection".

== See also ==
- 1814 in literature
