= Town and Country (play) =

Early nineteenth century comedic play written by Thomas Morton

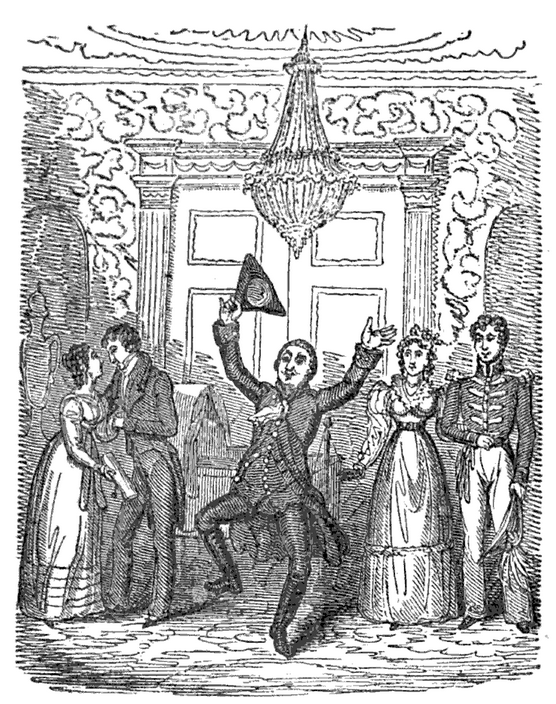
- Illustration from 1860 printing, Cumberland's British Theatre series
- Original language: English
- Written by: Thomas Morton
- Genre: Comedy

Premiere
- Date: 10 March 1807
- Place: Royal Opera House, London

Town and Country, or Which is Best? is an 1807 play by English playwright Thomas Morton. It was regularly performed in England and America during the 19th century.

== Background ==
The play debuted at Covent Garden in London on 10 March 1807. Morton obtained a payment of £1,000 from theatre manager Thomas Harris for the script regardless of whether the play was a success, which was a notable sum for its time. John Philip Kemble played the role of Reuben Glenroy and Charles Kemble filled the role of Plastic. Edmund Kean later played the lead role of Reuben Glenroy to great success.

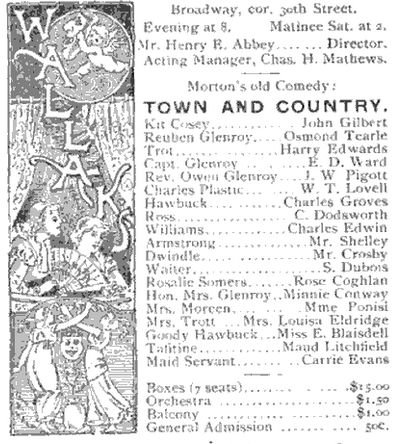
Advertisement for 1888 production at Wallack's Theatre in New York City. The cast included John Gilbert and Rose Coghlan.

The play was first performed in the United States in New York City on 2 November 1807 at the Park Theatre, with Thomas A. Cooper as Reuben Glenroy and Ellen Darley as Rosalie Somers.

== Legacy ==
After Morton's death in 1838, The Gentleman's Magazine commented "Mr. Harris was well regarded for his liberality" in paying Morton £1,000 for the play, because "it is one of the stock pieces of every theatre in the kingdom." However, it has also been said that Town and Country was "among the least successful productions" of Morton, but that John Kemble's acting in the role of Reuben Glenroy "is supposed to have saved the piece." T. Allston Brown's 1902 history of the New York stage shows the play being performed in the 1850s and 1860s, though it was revived at Wallack's Theatre as late as 1888.

A much later commentator referred to the "long popular" play as "a rather inane play that lived, I believe, because of the fondness of actors of the Kemble school for the character of Reuben Glenroy." In addition to John Kemble and Edmund Kean, well-known actors who played Reuben Glenroy include Thomas Apthorpe Cooper (New York debut in 1807), Charles Kean (son of Edmund), Junius Brutus Booth, Thomas S. Hamblin, James William Wallack, Lester Wallack, James Edward Murdoch, and George Vandenhoff.

== Original London cast (10 March 1807) ==
- Plastic by Charles Kemble
- Trot by Mr. Blanchard
- Cosey by Mr. Fawcett
- Rev. Owen Glenroy by Mr. Murray
- Reuben Glenroy by John Philip Kemble
- Captain Glenroy by Mr. Brunton
- Hawbuck by Mr. Emery
- Hon. Mrs. Glenroy by Mrs. Glover
- Rosalie Somers by Miss Brunton
- Mrs. Trot by Mrs. Mattocks
- Mrs. Moreen by Mrs. Davenport

== Original New York cast (2 November 1807) ==
- Reuben Glenroy by Thomas Apthorpe Cooper
- Rev. O. Glenroy by Mr. Tyler
- Capt. Glenroy by Mr. Claude
- Plastic by Mr. Darley
- Cosey by Mr. Twaits
- Trott by Ms. Harwood
- Hawbuck by Mr. Comer
- Mrs. Glenroy by Mrs. Turner
- Rosalie Somers by Mrs. Darley (Ellen Darley)
- Mrs. Trott by Mrs. Oldmixon (Georgina George Oldmixon)
- Mrs. Moreen by Mrs. Simpson
- Taffline by Mrs. Claude
