= Thomas Knight (actor) =

Actor and dramatist

- Died: 1820
- Occupations: theatre lessee, actor, playwright
- Spouse: Margaret Farren

Thomas Knight (died 1820), actor and dramatist, was born in Dorset of a family of no great wealth.

== Early career ==
He was intended for the legal profession, and received from Charles Macklin, the actor, lessons in elocution. A favourite with Macklin, he accompanied him to the theatre, acquiring in his visits tastes which led him to adopt the stage as a profession.

At an unrecorded date he appeared at the Richmond Theatre in Charles Surface, and failed conspicuously. He then joined Austin's company at Lancaster. Before leaving London he tried vainly to force upon Macklin a remuneration for his services as a teacher. Tate Wilkinson saw Knight, it is said, in Edinburgh, and engaged him for the York circuit. His first appearance was made in York in 1782 as Lothario to the Calista of Mrs Jordan. Wilkinson, who was greatly disappointed with him, advised him to quit the stage, but Knight struggled on, playing Charles Oakley, Spatterdash in the Young Quaker, Carbine in the Fair American, etc., and gradually grew in public favour. Wilkinson generously acknowledged the error of his former judgement, and during the five years in which Knight remained with the company he took the lead, and had only one quarrel with the management. Finding his name as Twineall in Such Things Are put third on the list, the customary place for the character, he insisted on its place being first, and being refused did not appear. On 27 October 1787 he played at the Bath Theatre as the Copper Captain, Spatterdash, Ramilie in the 'Miser', Duke of Monmouth in 'Such things were', and Marquis in the 'Midnight Hour' followed.

== Marriage ==
In 1787 Knight married at Bath, Margaret Farren, sister of the Countess of Derby (Elizabeth Farren).

In 1786 Margaret Farren played with Knight in York and followed him by to Bath for their wedding. Soon afterwards she made her first appearance there as Miss Peggy in The Country Girl to her husband's Sparkish. In the course of the same season Knight acted thirty characters, among which Touchstone, Trappanti, Claudio in Measure for Measure, Trim in Steele's The Funeral, Sir Charles Racket, and Pendragon may be mentioned. In Bath, as at Bristol, which was under the same management, he played during the nine years of his engagement an endless variety of comic parts—Charles Surface, Antonio in Follies of a Day, Clown in All's Well That Ends Well, Mercutio, Duretête, Goldfinch, Dromio of Ephesus, Pistol, and Autolycus being among the most easily recognisable.

== Covent Garden ==
Knight's first appearance at Covent Garden took place on 25 September 1795 as Jacob in The Chapter of Accidents (when his wife played Bridget) and Skirmish in Dibdin's The Deserter. Knight was seen in an endless number of parts at Covent Garden. The most important are Sim in Wild Oats, Hodge, Bob Acres, Slender in The Merry Wives of Windsor, Roderigo, Gratiano, Dick Dowlas, Sir Benjamin Backbite, Tony Lumpkin, Sergeant Kite in The Recruiting Officer, Sir Andrew Aguecheek, Touchstone, and Lucio in Measure for Measure. His original parts included Young Testy in Holman's Abroad and at Home, Count Cassel in Mrs. Inchbald's adaptation, Lovers' Vows, Changeable in Thomas Dibdin's Jew and the Doctor, Farmer Ashfield in Morton's Speed the Plough, and Corporal Foss in Colman's The Poor Gentleman.

== Edinburgh ==
After acting with his wife for three years at Covent Garden, they went together to Edinburgh, where he made, probably in error, his first appearance as Sir Harry Beagle in the 'Jealous Wife'. Mrs. Knight acted elsewhere and died in Bath in 1804.

With Fawcett, Holman, Johnstone, Pope, H. Johnston, Munden, and Incledon, Knight signed the well-known statement of the 'Differences subsisting between the Proprietors and Performers of Covent Garden', London, 1800, octavo (3rd edition). The lease of the Liverpool Theatre having come into the market, the house was taken by Knight in partnership with Lewis for fourteen years, at a rent elevated from £360 to £1,500, and was opened 6 June 1803 with 'Speed the Plough' and 'No Song, no Supper', and an address by T. Dibdin, spoken by Knight. During this season Knight remained at Covent Garden, where his last performance took place for his benefit, 15 May 1804, as Farmer Ashfield in 'Speed the Plough', and, for the first time, Lenitive in the 'Prize'. He also spoke an address. In 1802 he was living at 10 Tavistock Street, Covent Garden. While managing the Liverpool Theatre he lived first at Norton Hall, Lichfield, and subsequently at Woore, Shropshire. In 1817 a new lease was granted to Knight, Thomas Lewis, a son of his late partner, and Banks, with whom Knight became associated in the management of the Manchester Theatre. At the Manor House, Woore, 4 February 1820, Knight died with appalling suddenness.

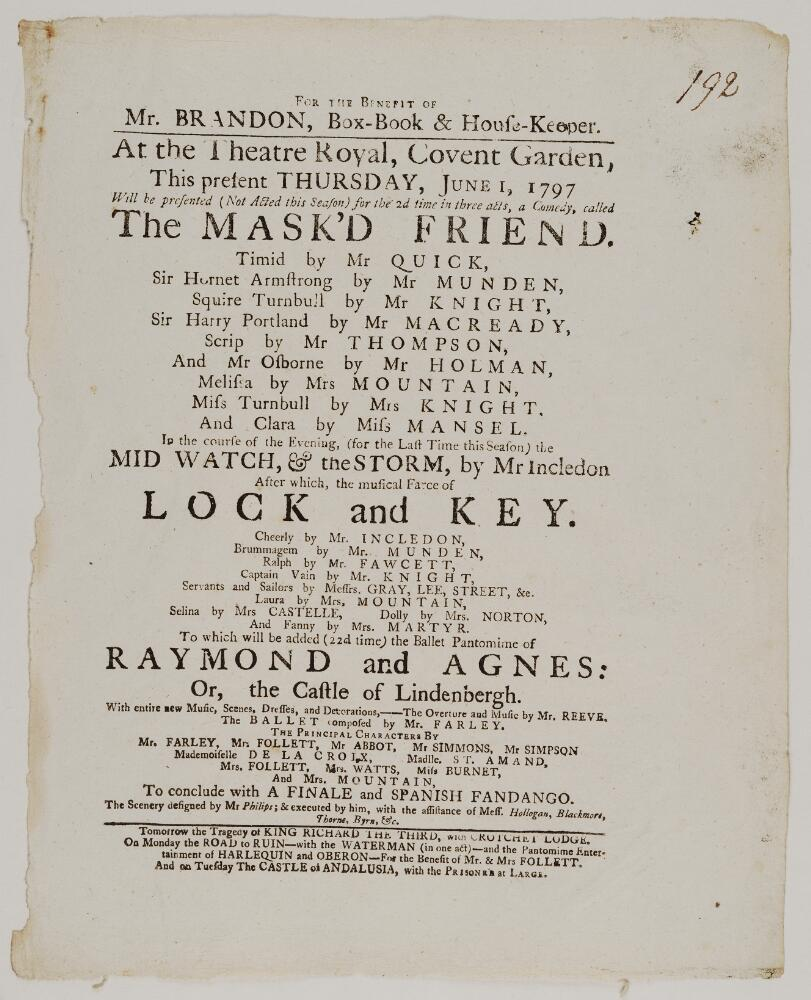
The Mask's Friend is attributed to Knight and he and his wife appeared in it in 1797

.

Knight wrote many pieces himself. His 'Thelyphthora, or the Blessings of two Wives at once', a farce, was acted at Hull in 1783, but neither printed nor apparently brought to London; 'Trudge and Wowski', a prelude, supposedly from 'Inkle and Yarico', was acted by Knight for his benefit in Bristol 1790, and 'Honest Thieves', a two-act abridgment of the 'Committee' of Sir Robert Howard, was produced at Covent Garden with Knight as Abel, 9 May 1797. On 14 November 1799 he appeared at Covent Garden as Robert Maythorn in his own 'Turnpike Gate'. This farce was printed in octavo, 1799, was well received, went through five editions in two years, and kept possession of the stage. Munden made in it as Crack a noteworthy success. Knight's 'Turnpike Gate' and the 'Honest Thieves' are included in collections of acting plays by Oxberry, Cumberland, Mrs. Inchbald, etc. The anonymous author of the 'Managers' Note-book', which appeared in the 'New Monthly Magazine', attributes to Knight the 'Masked Friend', an anonymous and unprinted reduction to three acts of Holcroft's 'Duplicity', given at Covent Garden for the benefit of Mr. and Mrs. Knight, 6 May 1796, with the former as Squire Turnbull and the latter as Miss Turnbull, and 'Hints for Painters', an unprinted farce, given on the same occasion; also 'What would the Man be at?' a one-act piece, unprinted, in which, for his benefit, he played Charles, George, and Will Belford, three brothers. Knight also wrote an 'Ode on the late Naval War and the Siege of Gibraltar', Hull, quarto, 1784, and some comic songs or recitations.

== Impact ==
Knight was an admirable actor, and a worthy man. Though living in good style, and consorting with men of science and letters, he realised an independence, which was augmented by a legacy from an uncle. His repertory was not unlike that of his namesake Edward Knight He had a light and elegant figure, a melodious voice, and much sense and tact. As Watty Cockney in the 'Romp', chosen for his second part, he did not create much effect, and his wife's Priscilla Tomboy was a failure, the result being that both were relegated for a time into obscurity. His great parts were Jacob Gawkey, Plethora in 'Secrets Worth Knowing', Count Cassel, and Farmer Ashfield, all very distinct impersonations. His Master Stephen in Ben Jonson's 'Every Man in his Humour', which he revived for his benefit, also won much praise. During the latter part of his life he assumed the position of a country gentleman, and left a reputation for great liberality. A portrait of him, by Zoffany, as Roger in the 'Ghost', is in the Garrick Club, where also are other portraits of him by De Wilde as Jacob, and by Wageman. (Note: The principal particulars are drawn from Tate Wilkinson's Wandering Patentee and from the Managers' Notebook. The European Magazine, the Monthly Mirror, and many other magazines have been consulted, as well as Genest's Account of the English Stage, the Biographia Dramatica, the Thespian Dictionary, Dibdin's Edinburgh Stage, etc.)
