= Julia Glover =

18th/19th-century Irish actress

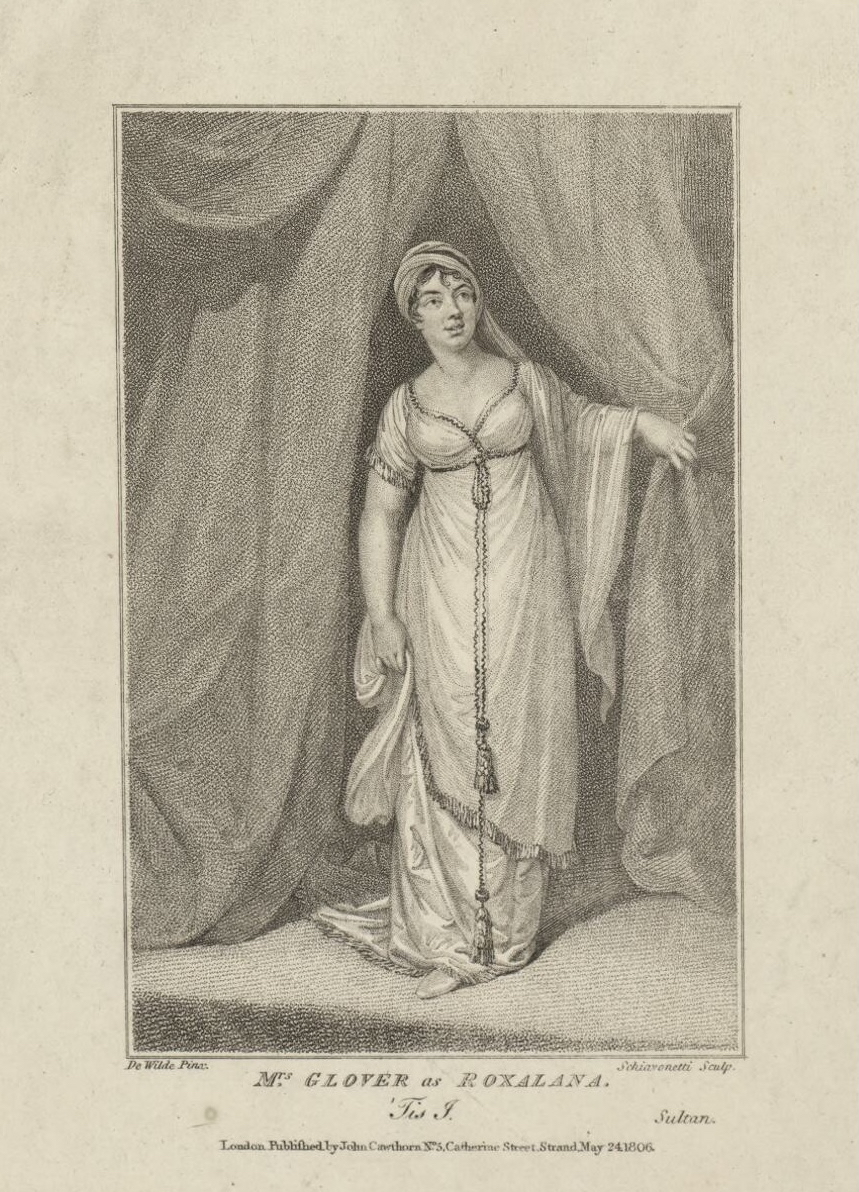
Portrait of Julia Glover as Roxalana

Julia Betterton Glover (8 January 1779 – 16 July 1850) was an Irish-born stage actress, well known for her comic roles in the late 18th and early 19th centuries.

== Biography ==
Glover was born Julia Butterton in 1779 or 1781 in Newry, Ireland.

In London in 1800 she married Samuel Glover the son of an industrial family from Birmingham. "Betterton" was not her real name, despite her father`s promotion of the fiction. She was born Julianna Butterton in Newry, Ireland, the daughter of the town`s theatre manager William Butterton. His venture failed and he decided there would be financial benefit to him if her name were changed to "Betterton", claiming links to a famous actor and long dead Thomas Betterton. With this deception he and his family travelled round the theatres and the young Julia was acclaimed as an infant acting prodigy in York, the West Country, Bath and elsewhere. At age 9 she made her debut in Scotland at the Dumfries Theatre Royal in 1790, and at age 16 she made her debut on the London stage in 1797.

As a child, she toured with her father and began taking small parts in plays. In 1787, she joined the York Circuit under manager Tate Wilkinson and appeared as the Page in Thomas Otway's The Orphan, as well as the Duke of York with George Frederick Cooke in Richard III. When Cooke was cast as Glumdalca, the Queen of the Giants, in Fieldings burlesque play Tom Thumb, Cooke chose Julia to play the title role. In 1795 she went to Bath and played the parts of Juliet, Imogen, Desdemona, Lady Macbeth and Lydia Languish. She became well known, particularly praised for her comic role as Languish, and news of her success reached London. A number of job offers were made, but they were declined by her father. He eventually accepted a lucrative offer (taking her salary for himself), for which she made her London début in 1797 as Percy by Hannah More.

Early in her career, Glover found herself competing for tragic parts with Maria Ann Campion, an actress from Dublin. Glover subsequently favoured comic roles. In 1800, her father sold her in marriage to Samuel Glover for £1, 000, although the money was never paid. Unhappily married, she had eight children, four of whom survived childhood. In 1820, she played Hamlet at the Lyceum Theatre to critical acclaim. In 1822, she appeared as Nurse in Romeo and Juliet at the Theatre Royal, Drury Lane; her daughter Phyllis played Juliet. On 8 February 1837, her father, with whom she had had an unhappy relationship, died.

One of her sons was Edmund Glover and another was William Howard Glover. In 1850, Glover announced her retirement from the stage. After two weeks confined to her bed, she appeared at Drury Lane for her farewell benefit performance on 12 July 1850 as Mrs. Malaprop in The Rivals. She was noticeably ill and weak during her performance and was unable to stand to receive her applause at the end of the play. Instead, the curtain rose to reveal Glover seated, surrounded by the rest of the cast. She died days later on 16 July 1850.

== Selected roles ==
- Emily Fitzallan in False Impressions by Richard Cumberland (1797)
- Lady Jane in He's Much to Blame by Thomas Holcroft (1798)
- Eleanor de Ferrars in The Eccentric Lover by Richard Cumberland (1798)
- Maria in Five Thousand a Year by Thomas Dibdin (1799)
- Caroline in The Votary of Wealth by Joseph George Holman (1799)
- Lady Susan Courtley in To Marry or Not to Marry by Elizabeth Inchbald (1805)
- Lady Le Brun in A Hint to Husbands by Richard Cumberland (1806)
- Mrs Glenroy in Town and Country by Thomas Morton (1807)
- The Unknown Lady in Ourselves by Marianne Chambers (1811)
- Alhadra in Remorse by Samuel Taylor Coleridge (1813)
- Laetitia Freemantle in First Impressions by Horatio Smith (1813)
- Tullia in Brutus by John Howard Payne (1818)
- Mrs Weilberg in The Three Strangers by Harriet Lee (1825)
- Jeanette in The French Libertine by John Howard Payne (1826)
- Dame Ryland in A School for Grown Children by Thomas Morton (1827)
- Lady Hampton in The School for Coquettes by Catherine Gore (1831)
- Madame Burkenstaff in The Minister and the Mercer by Alfred Bunn (1834)
- Widow Green in The Love Chase by James Sheridan Knowles (1837)
- Esther in The Maid of Mariendorpt by James Sheridan Knowles (1838)
- Mrs. Grigson in Quid Pro Quo by Catherine Gore (1844)
- Miss Brown in Look Before You Leap by George William Lovell (1846)
- Mrs. Malaprop in The Rivals by Richard Brinsley Sheridan (1850)
