= A Hint to Husbands =

1806 play

a Hint to Husbands
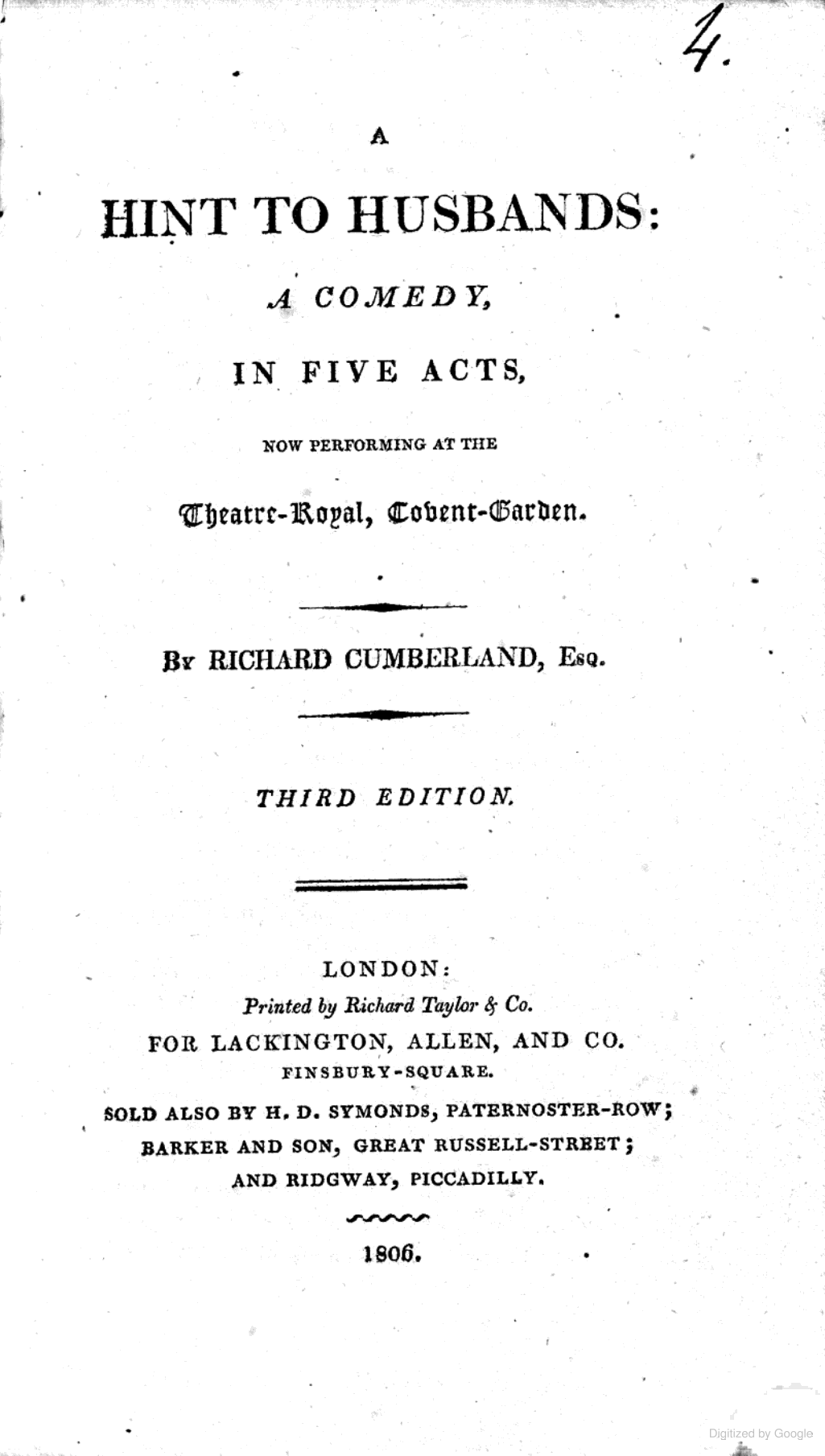
- Written by: Richard Cumberland
- Original language: English
- Genre: Comedy

Premiere
- Date premiered: 8 March 1806
- Place premiered: Theatre Royal, Covent Garden, London

A Hint to Husbands is an 1806 comedy play by the British dramatist Richard Cumberland which was first performed at Covent Garden Theatre. The prologue was written by James Bland Burgess. The play was not a success and lasted for only five nights. The original cast included Charles Kemble as Lord Transit, Henry Erskine Johnston as Sir Charles Le Brun, Alexander Pope as Heartright, John Fawcett as Fairford, John Brunton as George Trever, Charles Farley as Pliant, John Emery as Codicil, William Blanchard as Dogherty and Julia Glover as Lady Le Brun.

== Bibliography ==
- Mudford, William. The Life of Richard Cumberland. Sherwood, Neely & Jones, 1812.
