= John Duruset =

British singer stage actor

John Duruset (1793–1843) was a British stage actor and singer. He is also known as Jack Duruset and John Durousset. Born in London and showing a gift, he was apprenticed to the Italian composer and music teacher Domenico Corri. An early role came in Theodore Hook's The Siege of St Quintin (1808) at Drury Lane. Following the Drury Lane Fire of 1809 he moved with the company to the Lyceum Theatre. From 1810 was a regular for many years at the Theatre Royal, Covent Garden. He acted in many comic operas and musicals, as well as straight tragedies and non-musical comedies. He featured in the theatrical reviews of William Hazlitt. A portrait of him made by Henry William Pickersgill was displayed at the Royal Academy Exhibition of 1811.

== Selected roles ==
- Singer in The Siege of St Quintin by Theodore Hook (1808)
- Cymon in Cymon by David Garrick (1815)
- Clifton in The Slave by Thomas Morton (1816)
- Leander in The Padlock by Richard Cumberland (1821)
- Agib in Law of Java by George Colman (1822)
- Edward in Charles the Second by John Howard Payne (1824)
- Don Luis in Love's Victory by George Hyde (1825)
- Henry Dunderford in Teddy the Tiler by George Rodwell (1830)
- Bonnivet in Francis the First by Fanny Kemble (1832)
- Count Berghen in The Minister and the Mercer by Alfred Bunn (1834)

== Bibliography ==
- Genest, John. Some Account of the English Stage: From the Restoration in 1660 to 1830, Volume 9. H.E. Carrington, 1832.
- Fuhrmann, Christina. Foreign Opera at the London Playhouses. Cambridge University Press, 2015.
- Schoch, Richard (ed.) Macready, Booth, Terry, Irving: Great Shakespeareans: Volume VI. A&C Black, 2014.
