= Love's Victory (Hyde play) =

1825 play

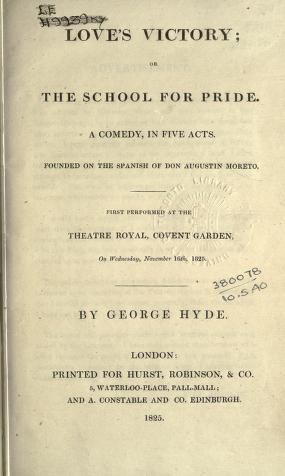
- Original language: English
- Written by: George Hyde
- Genre: Comedy
- Setting: Barcelona, Spain

Premiere
- Date: 16 November 1825
- Place: Theatre Royal, Covent Garden, London

Love's Victory is an 1825 comedy play by the British writer George Hyde. It premiered at the Theatre Royal, Covent Garden in London on 16 November 1825. The original cast included Charles Kemble as Don Cesar, Prince of Naples, John Duruset as Don Luis, Prince of Bearne, Daniel Egerton as Don Diego, Duke of Barcelona, Tyrone Power as Gaston, Prince of Foix, William Farren as Don Pedro, William Blanchard as Lopez and Maria Ann Lacy as Princess Diana. It was inspired by the seventeenth century Golden Age Spanish work El desdén, con el desdén by Agustín Moreto, which was also adapted by Molière. It published the same year by Hurst, Robinson of Waterloo Place in London and Constable in Edinburgh.

== Synopsis ==
Two suitors Don Cesar and Don Gaston court Princess Diana for her hand in marriage while Don Cesar, despite his love for her remains aloof, upsetting her pride. She plays them off against each other, leading to both the Princess and Don Cesar announcing their engagements to others, before eventually they are brought together.

== Bibliography ==
- Genest, John. Some Account of the English Stage: From the Restoration in 1660 to 1830, Volume 9. H.E. Carrington, 1832.
- Nicoll, Allardyce. A History of Early Nineteenth Century Drama 1800-1850. Cambridge University Press, 1930.
- Parker, Mary (ed.) Spanish Dramatists of the Golden Age: A Bio-bibliographical Sourcebook. Greenwood Publishing Group, 1998.
