= Margaret Farren =

British actress

Mrs Knight
- Born: Margaret Farren
- Died: 1804; Bath, England
- Other names: Mrs Knight
- Occupation: actor
- Spouse: Thomas Knight
- Relatives: Elizabeth Farren (sister)

Margaret Farren or Peggy Farren later Mrs Knight (died 1804) was a British actress, sister of Elizabeth Farren, the Countess of Derby.

== Life ==
Margaret (sometimes Peggy) Farren was the daughter of George Farren of Cork, Ireland, a surgeon and apothecary, later an actor, and his wife (née Wright) of Liverpool, the daughter of a publican or brewer. Her father died in 1770 leaving her mother to care for four daughters.

In 1774 she was acting with her mother and sisters at Wakefield under Tate Wilkinson's opponent, Whiteley.

Margaret had been seen at an early age in London, having played at the Haymarket, as Miss Peggy Farren, Titania in the Fairy Tale, a two-act adaptation of the A Midsummer Night's Dream, 18 June 1777. She joined Wilkinson in 1782; left him to act in Scotland and Ireland; and rejoined him in 1786.

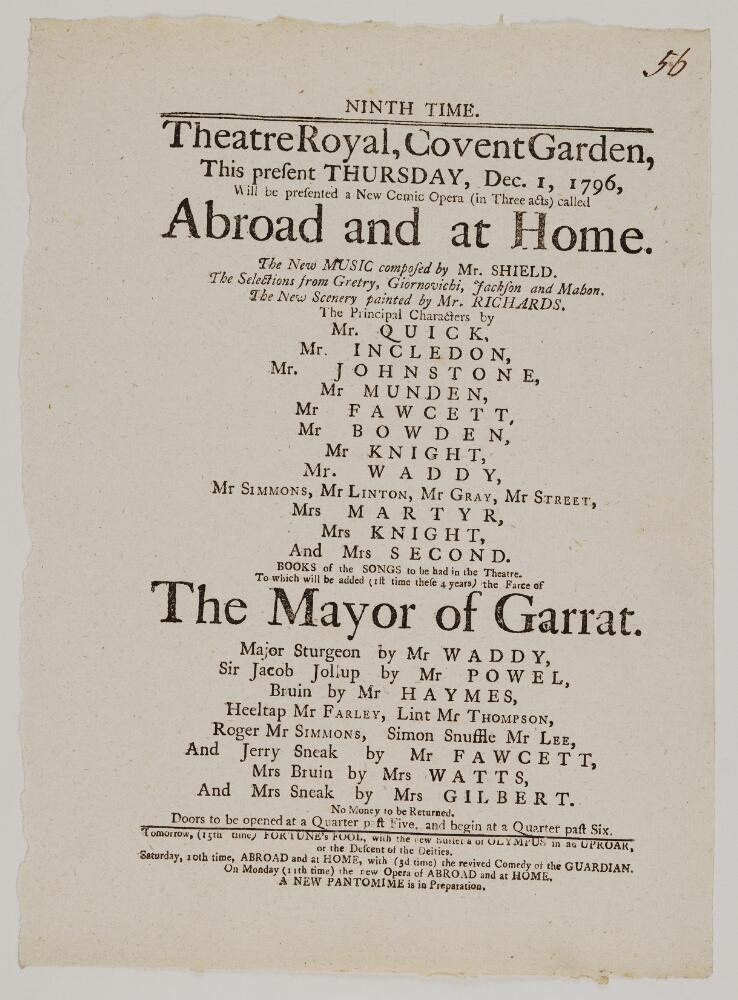
Playbill of Covent Garden, Thursday, Dec. 1, 1796, "Abroad and at home" including Mr and Mrs Knight

In that year she played with Thomas Knight in York, where she was a favourite, and followed him by arrangement to Bath for their wedding. She married Knight in 1788 and then appeared as "Mrs Knight". Soon afterwards she made her first appearance there as Miss Peggy in The Country Girl to her husband's Sparkish.

Her (and her husband's) first appearance at Covent Garden took place on 25 September 1795 as Bridget in The Chapter of Accidents. Her husband is credited with writing the 'Masked Friend', which was presented at Covent Garden for the benefit of Mr. and Mrs. Knight, on the 6 May 1796. Her husband played Squire Turnbull and she appeared as Miss Turnbull. 'Hints for Painters', an unprinted farce, was given on the same occasion.

She and her husband were at Covent Garden for three years, before they went to Edinburgh, where she played Aura in the 'Farm House' on 2 July 1799. She afterwards played at Newcastle and elsewhere before she returned to Bath and died there in 1804.
