= The Poor Gentleman =

1801 play

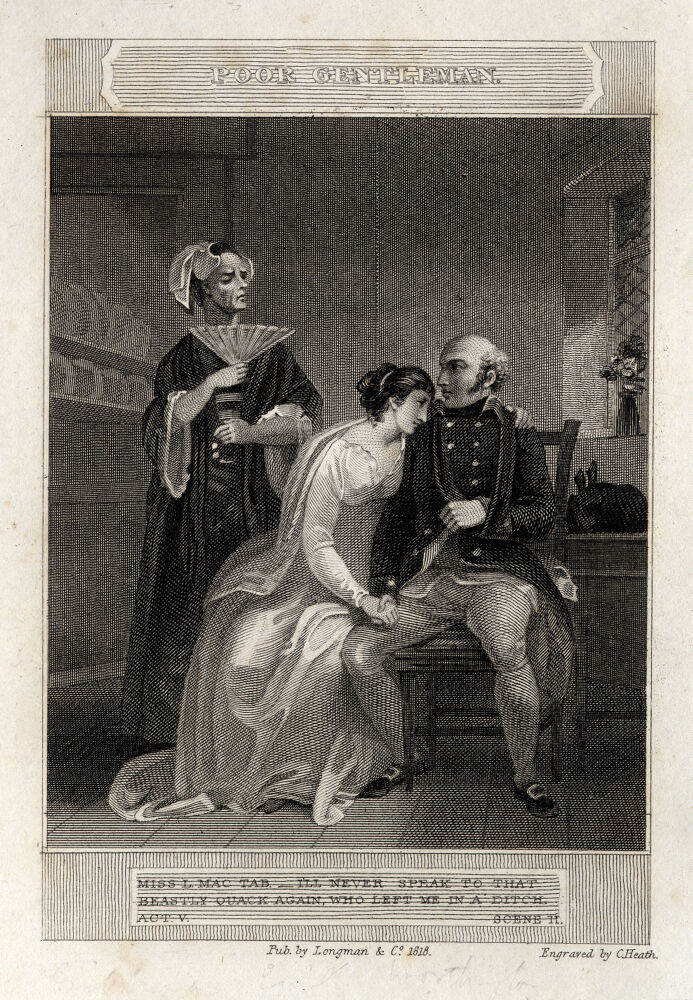
- Original language: English
- Written by: George Colman the Younger
- Genre: Comedy
- Setting: Kent, present day

Premiere
- Date: 11 February 1801
- Place: Theatre Royal, Covent Garden, London

The Poor Gentleman is an 1801 comedy play by the British writer George Colman the Younger. It premiered at London's Theatre Royal, Covent Garden on 11 February 1801. The original cast included Charles Murray as Lieutenant Worthington, Thomas Knight as Corporal Foss, Henry Erskine Johnston as Sir Charles Cropland, George Davenport as Warner, Joseph Shepherd Munden as Sir Robert Bramble, William Thomas Lewis as Frederick Bramble, John Waddy as Humphrey Dobbins, John Emery as Stephen Harrowby, John Fawcett as Doctor Ollapod, Maria Gibbs as Emily Worthington and Isabella Mattocks as Lucretia MacTab. It was revived in 1829 at the Theatre Royal, Drury Lane. In 1845 it appeared at the Chestnut Street Theatre in Philadelphia and the Park Theatre in New York.

== Bibliography ==
- Greene, John C. Theatre in Dublin, 1745-1820: A Calendar of Performances, Volume 6. Lexington Books, 2011.
- Nicoll, Allardyce. A History of Early Nineteenth Century Drama 1800-1850. Cambridge University Press, 1930.
