= Edward Litt Laman Blanchard =

English writer (1820–1889)

Edward L. L. Blanchard
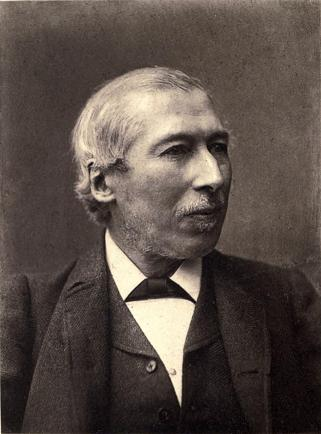
- Born: 11 December 1820; West End, London
- Died: 4 September 1889 (aged 68); London
- Known for: Playwright

Edward Litt Leman Blanchard, often referred to as E. L. Blanchard (11 December 1820 – 4 September 1889), was an English writer who is best known for his contributions to the Drury Lane pantomime. He began writing plays and other literature to support himself as a teenager after his father died. A succession of pantomimes supplied by him to one or other of the minor theatres, under the nom de plume of Francisco Frost, soon acquired for him a reputation as the contriver of these dramatic whimsicalities. He soon became a prolific creator of dramas and eventually gained critical acclaim for his works. He also served as a newspaper drama critic and mentored other writers.

== Early life ==
Edward Blanchard was born at 28 Great Queen Street, London, the second son of Sarah, the second wife of the actor William Blanchard. A half brother and three half sisters included the actress Elizabeth Blanchard An older brother William was born in 1811. He was educated at Brixton, Ealing and Lichfield, and accompanied his father to New York in 1831, where Elizabeth's husband Thomas Hamblin ran the Bowery theatre. After his return to England, Blanchard visited the exhibition of Holland and Joyce's OxyHydrogen microscope in New Bond Street. When his father died in 1835 when Edward was only 14 years old; shortly afterwards, he dropped out of school and joined a travelling "OxyHydrogen microscope" exhibition, even giving the lectures to the public himself on occasions. However, it did not pay well and he was eventually left stranded in the west of England; he managed to borrow half a crown from a scene-painter he had met in Bristol, and walked back to London in three days.

In London, he embarked on a literary career. He soon started writing plays, and had written over 30 of them by the time that he turned 20. His initial plays were written under the pen name Francisco Frost. He was paid only £2 per play when he started writing, and wrote advertisements for businesses and comic songs for clowns to supplement his income.

Blanchard began contributing to Renton Nicholson's The Town at the age of 17. He began contributing articles to the paper shortly after it was launched in 1837 and continued writing for them for the next two years. He later described the articles that he wrote there as "social essays and dramatic notices". One of the first articles that he wrote for the paper described underground gambling in Leicester Square. The articles The Town published on the gambling there were later credited with causing the London police to suppress the gambling there. Years later, after Nicholson's death, Blanchard defended Nicholson against some of his critics, contending that he was a kind and generous man who produced much "clever and utterly unobjectionable" work.

== Career ==
In 1841 Blanchard was hired by the Olympic Theatre to write regularly for their plays. In 1845 a play that he wrote was staged at the Surrey Theatre for the first time. He also served as a writer and editor for several periodicals in the early 1840s, including Punch and The New London Magazine. He also edited a large work on William Shakespeare by Samuel Phelps.

Blanchard travelled extensively in order to write a Bradshaw's Guide, Descriptive Guide to the Great Western Railway, Part II and other guides in the 1840s.

Blanchard's most successful position was writing the Drury Lane pantomimes. He contributed pantomimes for that theatre for 37 years. He was applauded for his skill in writing on a variety of different topics, including dramas, farces and burlesques. His work was often praised for good taste and moral themes, in addition to its imaginative qualities.

In 1858 he began writing for The Daily Telegraph. He later became the paper's dramatic critic. In that role he served as a mentor to Clement Scott, who later became his successor. In 1859 Blanchard began writing for the Birmingham Daily Gazette, as well.

== Later life ==
Blanchard lived in Adelphi Terrace from 1876 until 1889. He had four children and often struggled to support his family due to the limited income he received from his writing. His wife Caroline was active in Louisa Hubbard's Women's Emigration Society that helped indigent young women from London emigrate to Australia or Canada.

He died on 4 September 1889 at Albert Mansions, Victoria Street, London, after a long illness described by the attending Doctor as "creeping paralysis". He was buried at Royal Borough of Kensington and Chelsea Cemetery, Hanwell.

In 1891 The Life and Reminiscences of E. L. Blanchard was published in two volumes. It was edited by Clement Scott and Cecil Howard and published by Hutchinson. The memoir has been described as "a memorial of arduous and incessant struggles and, until near the end, of miserable pay" and "a delightful picture of one of the kindest, most genial and lovable of Bohemians – a man with some of the charm of Charles Lamb".

== Works ==
Under the nom de plume Francisco Frost:

- The Old Woman and her Three Sons; or, Harlequin and the Wizard of Wokey Hole (1839)
- Pat-A-Cake Pat-A-Cake; or, Harlequin and the Baker's Man! (1839)
- The World of Wonders; or, Harlequin Caxton, and the Origin of Printing (1847)
- Eyes, Nose, and Mouth; or, Harlequin Prince Perfect, and the Birth of Beauty (1847)
- The Pets of the Ballet, a song (1847)
- William the Conqueror and Harlequin Harold; or, The Sack of the Saxons (1848)
- Belphegore the Itinerant (1851)
- Sir John Barleycorn; or, Harlequin Champagne and the Fairies of the Hop and Vine (1852)

As E L Blanchard:

- Arcadia; or, The Shepherd and Shepherdess (1841)
- Heads and Tales of Travellers and Travelling (1847)
- Harlequin Lord Lovell; or, Lady Nancy Bell and the Fairies of the Silver Oak (1848)
- Little Goody Two Shoes; or, Harlequin Cock Robin (1862)
- Number Nip; or, Harlequin and the Gnome King of the Giant Mountain (1866)
- Sinbad (1882)
