= Charles the Second (play) =

1824 play

- Original language: English
- Written by: John Howard Payne
- Genre: Historical comedy
- Setting: London, 17th century

Premiere
- Date: 27 May 1824
- Place: Theatre Royal, Covent Garden, London

Charles the Second is an 1824 historical comedy in two acts by the British-based American writer John Howard Payne. It is set at the court of Charles II in Restoration London, and features a series of adventures in the company of his friend Rochester. It premiered at the Theatre Royal, Covent Garden on 27 May 1824. The original cast included Charles Kemble as Charles II, John Duruset as Edward, John Fawcett as Captain Copp, Harriet Faucit as Lady Clara, Maria Tree as Mary. It was performed 14 times in its initial run. An afterpiece, the running time was roughly an hour and fifty minutes. It subsequently performed in the United States at the Park Theatre Olympic Theatre in New York.

== Bibliography ==
- Genest, John. Some Account of the English Stage: From the Restoration in 1660 to 1830, Volume 9. H.E. Carrington, 1832.
- Nicoll, Allardyce. A History of Early Nineteenth Century Drama 1800-1850. Cambridge University Press, 1930.
