= Edmund Glover =

British actor, artist, and manager (c. 1813–1860)

Edmund Glover (22 August 1811 – 14 October 1860) was a British actor, artist, manager and theatre owner.

== Life ==
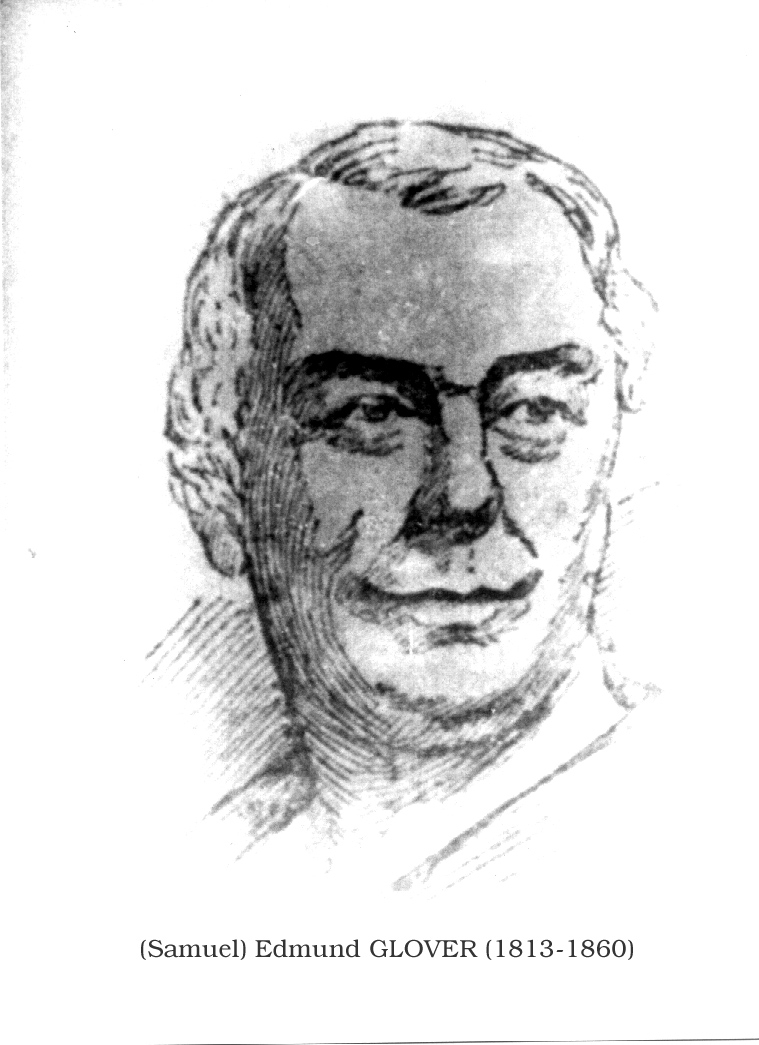
Edmund Glover, actor, theatre owner and impresario

Glover was the eldest son of Julia Glover and half brother of William Howard Glover. He wrote two leather clad diaries in copper plate writing, covering ten years of his daily life from Thursday 9 May 1850 to his death on 15 August 1860. The diaries (in private ownership), show a truly fascinating insight to his life and running of the theatres, showing finances and various financial debts that emerged from his over generosity to various friends and acquaintances. The first diary writing describing his delight of his daughter being born at a quarter to six o'clock. His family life and problems. He describes a visit by steam train to witness a national public hanging of a notorious murderer at the time. Also references to, his son William's friendship with Charles Dickens. Towards the end of his life, his diary writings deteriorate right up until his final hours, when the doctor calls and he succumbs to TB. Most of his paintings are held in storage in the Glasgow museum. His painting of The Forge by Moonlight, (which is mentioned on its completion in the diaries) is in private hands, along with his ring enclosing a lock of his hair. He occupied for a time a leading position at the Haymarket Theatre London, and went to Edinburgh, where, under WH Murray, he played leading business. He appears to have joined that company about 1841. He was a man of diversified talents, a sound, though not a brilliant actor, a good dancer, fencer, and pantomimist, and the possessor of some skill in painting. A high position was accordingly conceded him in Scotland. His salary in 1842 was three guineas weekly. On 16 January 1848 he played Falkland in the 'Rivals,' being his first appearance after a recent severe accident. At this period he engaged Jenny Lind to sing in Edinburgh, Glasgow, and Perth, and cleared £3,000 by the transaction. Emboldened by this success he took a large hall in West Nile Street, Glasgow, which he opened as the Prince's Theatre.

In 1852 Glover also became lessee then owner of the Theatre Royal, Dunlop Street, Glasgow. He became lessee for seasons of the Theatres Royal at Paisley and Dunfermline, and in 1859 built and opened the Theatre Royal Greenock. During this period his connection with Edinburgh was maintained. On 27 March 1850 he was Othello to Macready's Iago. He played Falkland at Murray's farewell benefit, 22 October 1851. On 17 March 1856 he began to alternate with Powrie the parts of Macbeth and Macduff, on 24 February 1857 played the brothers Dei Franchi to the Baron Giordine of Henry Irving, and on his last appearance at the Edinburgh Theatre Royal, 25 May 1859, was, at his own desire, Triplet in Masks and Faces.

Edmund Glover's repertoire focussed on the great classical plays, pantomimes, and operas (although he noted these "do not make so much profit because of the larger expenditure".) . After a brief illness he died on 23 October 1860 of dropsy, at 3 Gayfield Place, Edinburgh, in the house of Robert Wyndham, subsequently manager of the Theatre Royal in Edinburgh.

== Family ==
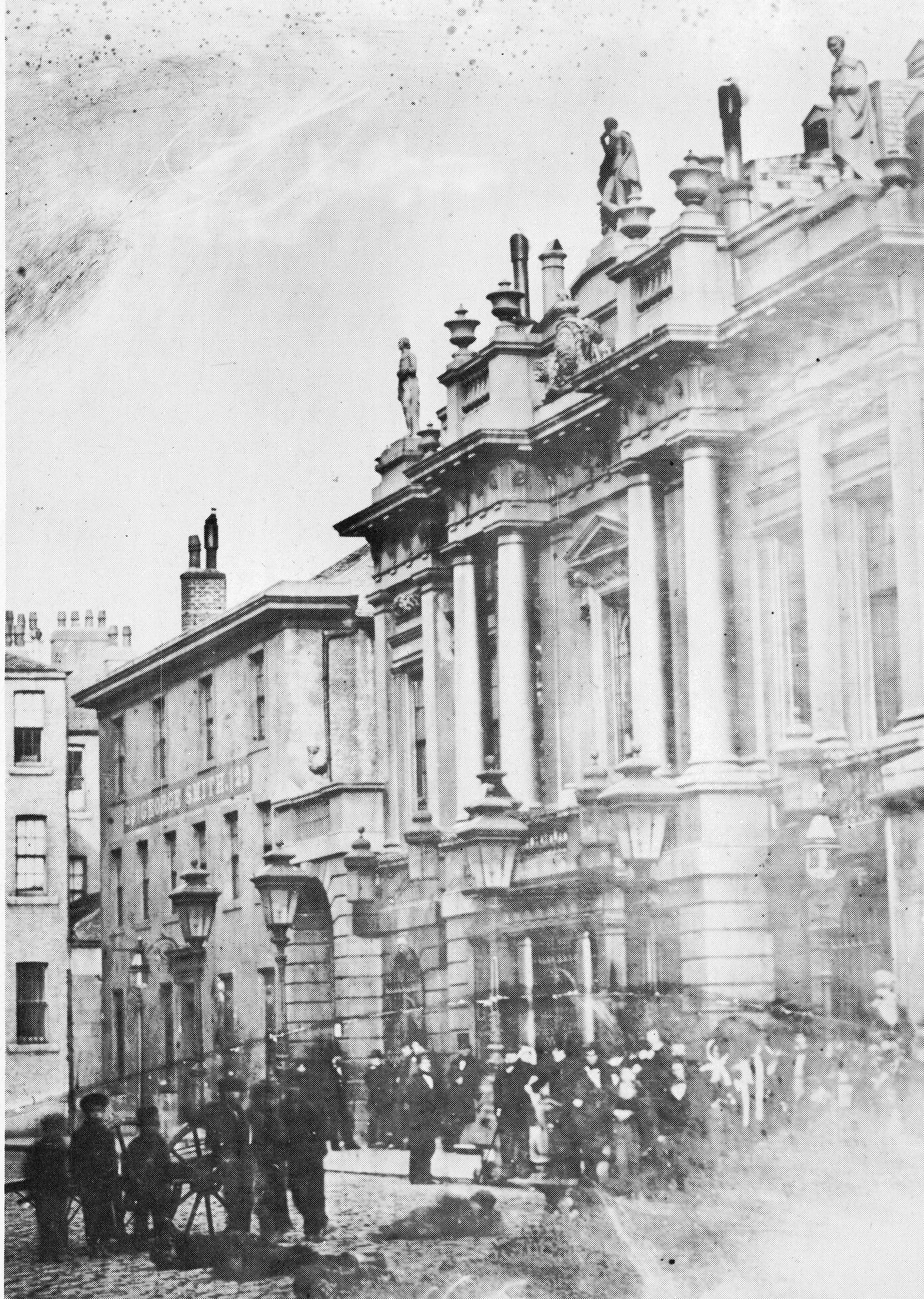
Theatre Royal Dunlop Street Glasgow in 1855.

Glover left behind him, in addition to other children, a son, William Glover, who continued to operate the Theatre Royal, Dunlop Street, Glasgow until 1869 and thereafter the new Theatre Royal, Glasgow until 1879. He also ran the Theatre Royal, Newcastle and other theatres. His forte was theatre management, production and scenic painting and the Glover Studios continued with distinction in to the 1960s. A second son, Samuel, a comedian, died abroad. Many of Edmund Glover's descendants continued in theatre, in America, Australia and Britain, including his scenic artist son William Glover operating in theatres in Glasgow, Newcastle and Kilmarnock, actress daughter Phillis Glover of New York and Britain, actress daughter Amy Glover whose husband managed theatres in Britain and Ireland, son Robert Glover who started his own theatrical family in Australia and New Zealand, grandson Ernest Glover who migrated to Canada as a scenic artist and then producer, and great granddaughter Rita Glover, born in Glasgow in 1902, who migrated to America becoming a producer and director of theatres in California, and then became Professor of Theatrical Art & Design at the University of California until her death in 1959. His great great great grandson currently lives in Norfolk UK.
