= William Howard Glover =

British composer

William Howard Glover (1819-1875), was an English musical composer and writer.

Glover was the second son of Julia Glover, the actress, and said to be descended from the Bettertons. He was born at Kilburn, London, on 6 June 1819; entered the Lyceum Opera orchestra, conducted by his master, wagstaff, as violinist when fifteen; continued his studies on the continent, and was soon afterwards employed as accompanist and solo violinist in London and the provinces. He founded, in conjunction with his mother, the Musical and Dramatic Academy in Soho Square, and was encouraged by its success to open a season of opera at Manchester, his pupils forming the nucleus of the company. Glover was joined in this or similar enterprises by his elder brother Edmund and Miss Romer. Returning to London he gave annual monster concerts at St. James's Hall and Drury Lane Theatre. His pupils Miss Emily Soldene, Miss Palmer, and many first-rate artists appeared, the length of the entertainments inspiring more than one foreign critic with philosophic reflections upon the English amateur's capacity of endurance.

To Glover belongs the credit of initiating the performance of Beethoven's 'Pastoral Symphony' with pictorial and choreographic illustrations in 1863; and 'Israel in Egypt' with scenery, dresses, and poses, in 1865. His cantata, 'Tam o' Shanter,' for tenor solo, chorus, and orchestra, was produced at the New Philharmonic, Berlioz conducting, on 4 July 1855, and pleased so greatly by its pleasant melodies, local colouring, and lively effects, that it was given at the following Birmingham festival, 30 August 'Ruy Blas,' opera, written and composed by Glover and adapted from the play of the same name by Victor Hugo, was produced on 24 Oct. 1861 at Covent Garden, and was successful enough for frequent repetition and a revival two years later: the comic opera, 'Once too Often,' was first performed at Drury Lane on 20 Jan. 1862, 'The Coquette' in the provinces, 'Aminta' at the Haymarket, and 'Palomita' in New York. The overtures 'Manfred' and 'Comala,' the songs, 'Old Woman of Berkeley,' 'Love's Philosophy,' 'The Wind's a Bird,' are only a few of his compositions, many of which were published in America. From about 1849 to 1865 Glover undertook the musical criticisms for the 'Morning Post;' in 1868 he settled in New York as professor and conductor of Niblo's orchestra, and he died there on 28 October 1875.
