= The Minister and the Mercer =

1834 play

- Original language: English
- Written by: Alfred Bunn
- Genre: Comedy
- Setting: Copenhagen, 1772

Premiere
- Date: 8 February 1834
- Place: Theatre Royal, Drury Lane, London

The Minister and the Mercer is an 1834 historical comedy play by the British writer Alfred Bunn. It premiered at the Theatre Royal, Drury Lane in London on 8 February 1834. The original cast included William Farren as Count Bertrand De Rauntzu, Charles James Mathews as Falkensteid, John Duruset as Count Berghen, William Dowton as Raton Burkenstaff, John Cooper as Eric Burkenstaff, Benjamin Nottingham Webster as John, Robert William Honner as Dorsten, Mrs. Sloman as Marie Julie, Ellen Kean as Christine and Julia Glover as Madame Burkenstaff. It was inspired by the 1833 French play Bertrand et Raton by Eugène Scribe. It takes place in Denmark in 1772 at time when Christian VII of Denmark was mad, and his physician takes virtual charge of the country leading to a coup to oust him.. It ran for forty one days.

== Bibliography ==
- Burwick, Frederick. British Drama of the Industrial Revolution. Cambridge University Press, 2015.
- Nicoll, Allardyce. A History of Early Nineteenth Century Drama 1800-1850. Cambridge University Press, 1930.
- Stephens, John Russell. he Censorship of English Drama 1824-1901. Cambridge University Press, 2010.
