= A School for Grown Children =

1827 play

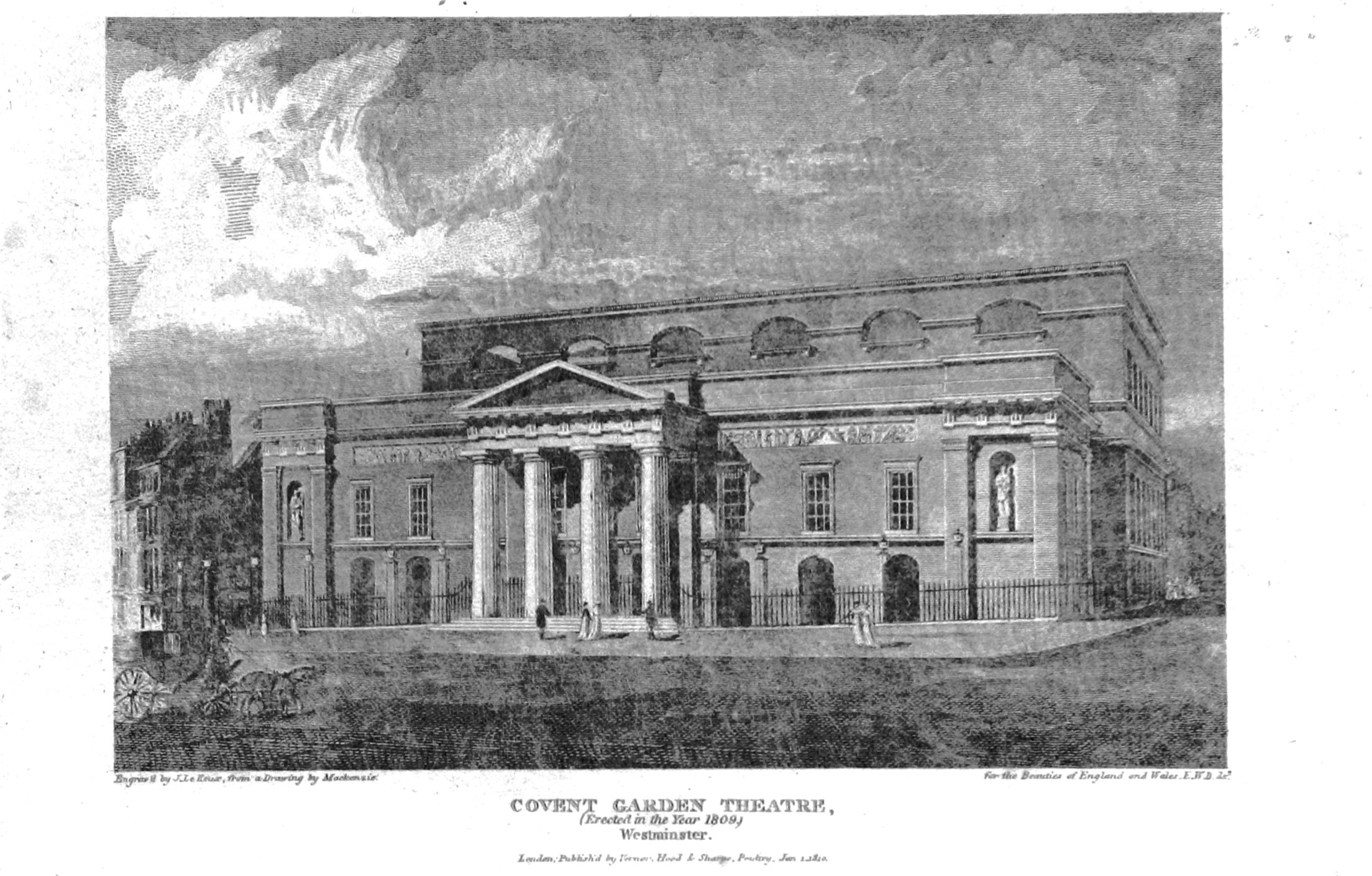
- Covent Garden Theatre
- Original language: English
- Written by: Thomas Morton
- Genre: Comedy
- Setting: England, Present day

Premiere
- Date: 9 January 1827
- Place: Theatre Royal, Covent Garden, London

A School for Grown Children is an 1827 comedy play by the British writer Thomas Morton. It premiered at the Theatre Royal, Covent Garden in London on 9 January 1827. The original cast included Charles Kemble as Sir Arthur Stanmore, William Farren as Old Revel, Thomas James Serle as Frank Reyland, Tyrone Power as Dexter, Robert Keeley as Buttercup, Eliza Chester as Lady Stanmore, Louisa Chatterley as Mrs Revel, Julia Glover as Dame Ryland and Mary Gossop Vining as Miss Raven. It enjoyed success, running for 24 nights.

== Synopsis ==
Sir Arthur and Lady Stanmore have been married for five weeks and are very happy. However, her friend Miss Raven persuades her to behave in a capricious manner to her husband leading to a falling out. A similar story follows Sir Arthur's acquaintance, the wealthy Revel and his spendthrift son who he decides to teach a less by pretending he has lost his fortune.

== Bibliography ==
- Genest, John. Some Account of the English Stage: From the Restoration in 1660 to 1830, Volume 9. H.E. Carrington, 1832.
- Sutcliffe, Barry (ed.) Plays by George Colman the Younger and Thomas Morton. CUP Archive, 1983.
