= Elizabeth Hamblin =

American actress

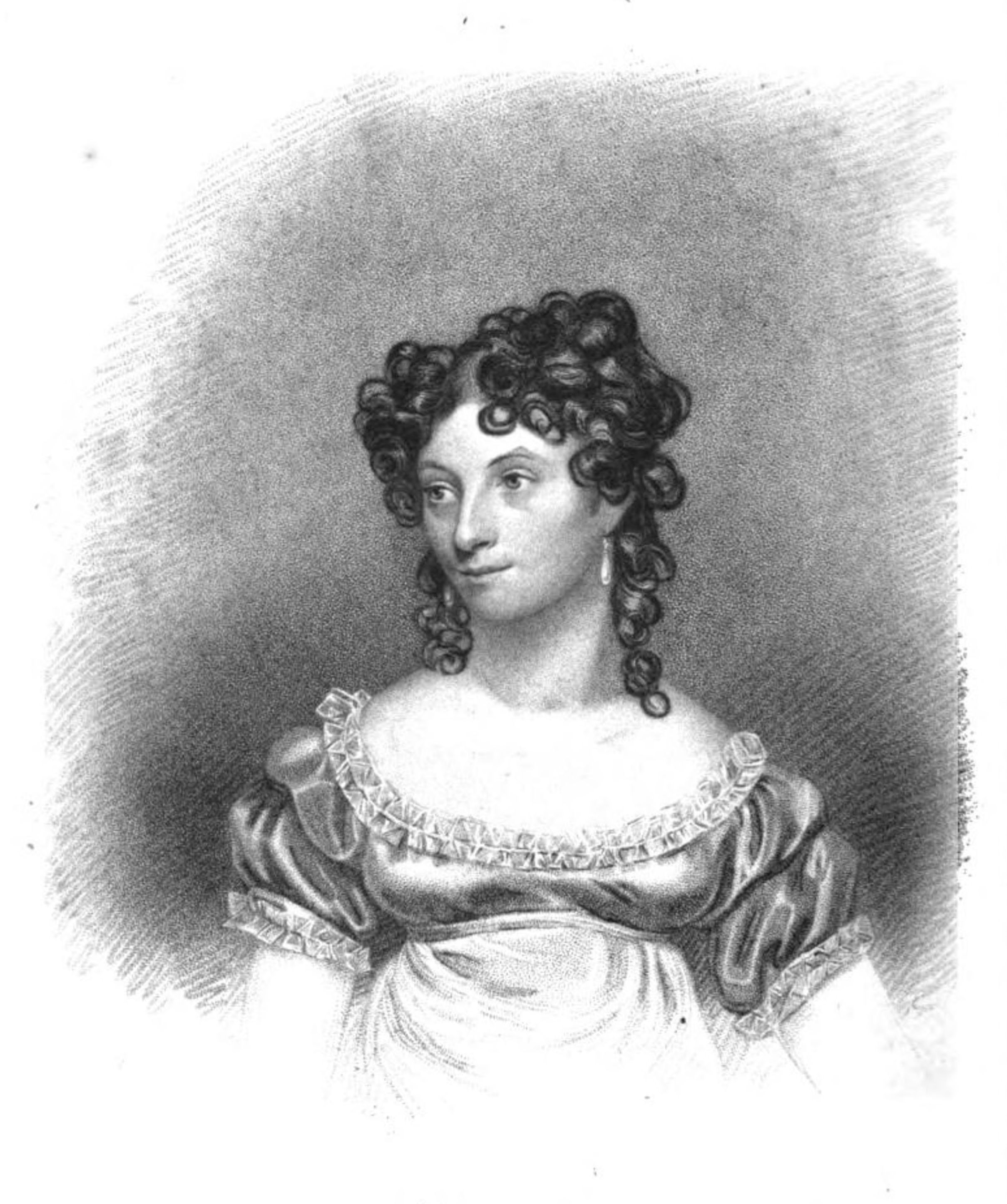
Miss Elizabeth Walker Blanchard as a young woman

Elizabeth Hamblin (born Elizabeth Walker Blanchard; 1799–1849) was a British-born American stage actress and one of the first female theatre managers in the United States.

== Personal life ==
Hamblin was the daughter of actor William Blanchard and the half-sister of playwright E. L. Blanchard. She married the actor Thomas S. Hamblin, whom she divorced in 1834. She later married her colleague, James Charles.

She was the mother to actor Thomas (William Henry) Hamblin Jr. and Elizabeth “Betsey” Hamblin.

== Career ==
Hamblin had a successful acting career in New York from the 1820s to 1840s. She made her debut at the Haymarket Theatre in London in 1818 and debuted in the United States at the Park Theatre in 1825. She had a long-time involvement with the Bowery Theatre, where she was one of the main attractions.

Her career at the Bowery ended in 1832, and in 1834 she divorced her first husband and manager of the Bowery, Thomas Hamblin. She continued her involvement with other theatres, mainly in New York.

Hamblin also worked as a theatre manager and was the first woman in the United States to have several duties at different theatres. From 1836-37 she managed the Richmond Hill Theatre in New York (with a temporary break in 1836 during Annette Nelson’s time as director), and at one point was seen as a competitor to her former husband. Hamblin focused on a narrow range of high-culture theatre art, including ballet.

She also managed the Olympic Theatre in 1838, and the musical stages of Tivoli Garden and Colonnade Garden in 1840. During the 1840s she toured the American South and was involved with many theatres. She died in New Orleans in 1849.
