= Bridge Frodsham =

English actor

Bridge Frodsham (1734-21 October 1768) was an English actor.

== Life ==
He was born in Frodsham, Cheshire in 1734. He was admitted on the foundation of Westminster School in 1746, but ran away; in 1748, he was received back at the school. He ran away a second time, and making his way to Leicester attached himself to a theatrical company. He was encouraged by J. G. Cooper of Thurgarton, Nottinghamshire, once also a Westminster boy, to make acting his profession, and joined the company at York.

He quickly became popular, and was known as the ‘York Garrick.’ Tate Wilkinson thought his Hamlet of a high standard. He rarely left York. He died 21 October 1768 at Kingston upon Hull, his end being accelerated by drink.
