= Caroline Howard =

New Zealand businesswoman (1821–1907)

Caroline Cadette Howard (3 August 1821 – 29 November 1907) was a New Zealand businesswoman, immigration officer, lecturer and journalist. She is notable for her work as a businesswoman and promoter of emigration and employment for women. She recruited several thousand poor English, Scottish and Irish women to move to New Zealand and Australia and find work there.

She was born in London, England on 3 August 1821 as Caroline Cadette Bollin. She married multiple times, becoming variously known as Caroline Cadette Alpenny (m. William Morris Alpenny 1 August 1843, in London, England, divorced 1859); Caroline Cadette Howard, (m. George Richard Howard 26 December 1867, in Dunedin, New Zealand. Mr. Howard died 27 April 1872); and Caroline Cadette Blanchard a.k.a. Mrs. E. L. Blanchard (m. Edward Litt Laman Blanchard 11 June 1874, probably in London. Mr. Blanchard died 4 September 1889). She also wrote under the pen-name of Carina, the name Blanchard used to refer to her in his memoirs.

Her success in supporting the emigration and employment of women was credited by her contemporary Emily Faithfull (also an advocate for women's employment) to "her personal knowledge of the Colonies themselves as well as of the women she sends to them, her untiring efforts to secure the right people for the right places, her judicious selection of ships and captains, her wise choice of matrons, and last, but not least, the admirable provision she makes for the proper reception of emigrants at the various ports abroad."
