= Children in the Wood =

The Children in the Wood
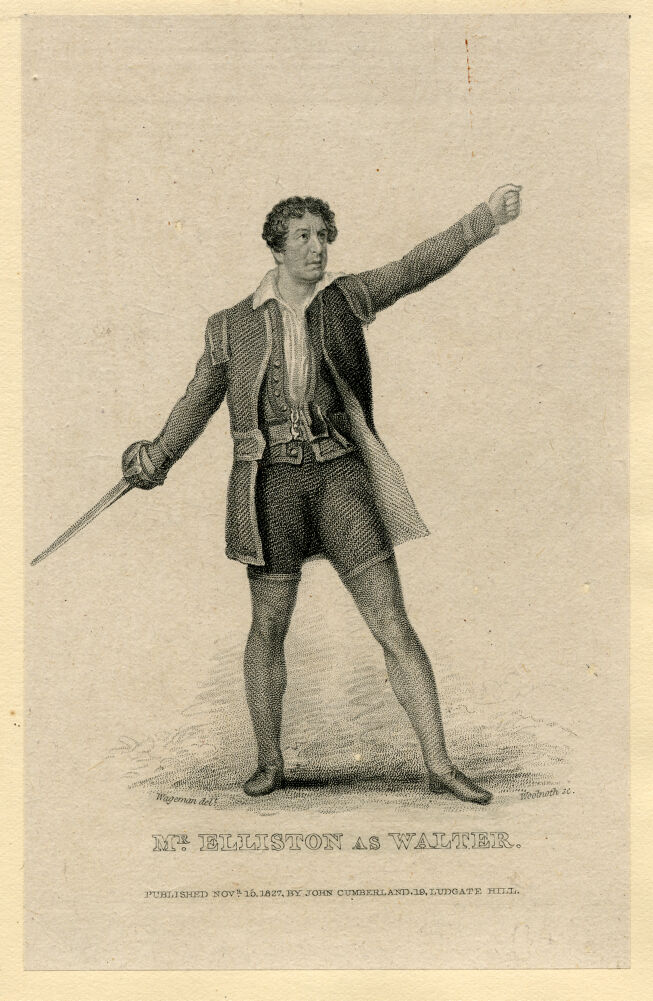
- Robert William Elliston as Walter
- Written by: Thomas Morton, Samuel Arnold
- Original language: English

Premiere
- Date premiered: October 1, 1793
- Place premiered: Theatre Royal Haymarket, London

The Children in the Wood is a 1793 two-act musical play with a libretto by English playwright Thomas Morton and music by Samuel Arnold. It was derived from the children's story Babes in the Wood, and was very popular into the early 19th century.

The play debuted at the Theatre Royal Haymarket on October 1, 1793. The Universal Magazine of Knowledge and Pleasure called it "one of the most interesting trifles that has been lately exhibited." "The subject is the old legendary tale of the Babes of the Wood; and though the author has necessarily departed from the anecdote in the ballad, by saving the infants, he has imparted much tenderness and simplicity to the fable, and in the gayer scenes thrown much cheerfulness into his characters." The review also praised the performance of actor John Bannister.

== Original cast ==
The following appeared in the original cast for the play:

- Sir Rowland by William Barrymore
- Lord Alford by Charles Dignum
- Walter (the Carpenter) by John Bannister
- Oliver, Servant to Sir Rowland by Thomas Caulfield
- 1st Ruffian by Mr. Burton
- 2nd Ruffian by Mr. Cooke
- The boy by Master Frederick Menage
- Apathy (the tutor) by Richard "Dicky" Suett
- Servant (to Lord Alford) by Mr. Maddocks
- Gabriel by Mr. Benton
- Josephine by Maria Bland
- Lady Helen by Mrs. Hopkins
- Winifred by Maria Theresa De Camp
- The girl by Miss Mary Menage
