= John Emery (English actor) =

English actor (1777–1822)

John Emery (1777–1822), was an English actor.

Emery was born at Sunderland, 22 September 1777, and obtained a rudimentary education at Ecclesfield in the West Riding of Yorkshire. His father, Mackle Emery (died 18 May 1825), was a country actor, and his mother, as Mrs. Emery, sen., appeared 6 July 1802 at the Haymarket Theatre as Dame Ashfield in Morton's Speed the Plough, and subsequently played at Covent Garden Theatre.

== From musician to actor ==
Emery was brought up for a musician, and when twelve years of age was in the orchestra at the Brighton Theatre. At this house he made his first appearance as Old Crazy in the farce of Peeping Tom by O'Keeffe.’ John Bernard says that in the summer of 1792 Mr. and Mrs. Emery and their son John, a lad of about seventeen, who played a fiddle in the orchestra and occasionally went on in small parts, were with him at Teignmouth, again at Dover, where young Emery played country boys, and again in 1793 at Plymouth. Bernard claims to have been the means of bringing Emery on the stage, and tells an amusing story concerning the future comedian. After playing a short engagement in Yorkshire with Tate Wilkinson, who predicted his success, he was engaged to replace T. Knight at Covent Garden, where he was first seen, 21 September 1798, as Frank Oatland in Morton's A Cure for the Heart Ache.

Lovegold in Miser and Oldcastle in the Intriguing Chambermaid (both by Fielding), Abel Drugger in the Tobacconist (an alteration by Francis Gentleman of Jonson's The Alchemist) and many other parts followed. On 13 June 1800 he appeared for the first time at the Haymarket as Zekiel Homespun in The Heir at Law by Colman, a character in the line he subsequently made his own. At Covent Garden, 11 February 1801, he was the original Stephen Harrowby in Colman's The Poor Gentleman.

== Later roles ==
In 1801 he played at the Haymarket Clod in the Young Quaker of O'Keeffe, Farmer Ashfield in Speed the Plough, and other parts. From this time until his death he remained at Covent Garden, with the exception of playing at the English Opera House, 16 August 1821, as Giles in the Miller's Maid, a comic opera based on one of the Rural Tales of Bloomfield, adapted by John Davy.

He was the original Dan in Colman's John Bull, 5 March 1803; Tyke in Morton's School of Reform, 15 January 1805; Ralph Hempseed in Colman's X Y Z, 11 December 1810; Dandie Dinmont in Guy Mannering, 12 March 1816, and Ratcliff in the Heart of Midlothian, 17 April 1819, (both by Terry, based on novels by his friend Sir Walter Scott). His last performance was Edie Ochiltree in The Antiquary (again by Terry, based on Scott), 29 June 1822.

On 25 July 1822 he died of inflammation of the lungs in Hyde Street, Bloomsbury, and was buried 1 August in a vault in St. Andrew's, Holborn. On 5 August 1822, under the patronage of the Duke of York, several plays and a concert, were given at Covent Garden for the benefit of Emery's aged parents, widow and seven children. An address by Colman was spoken by Bartley, and a large sum was realised.

No less than seven portraits of him in various characters, of which four are by De Wilde, and one presenting him together with Liston, Mathews, and Blanchard, by Clint, are in the Mathews collection at the Garrick Club.

== Assessment of his career ==
Tyke was Emery's great part, in which he left no successor. He was excellent in some Shakespearean parts. Of his Barnardine in Measure for Measure Genest, a reserved critic, says, "Emery looked and acted inimitably". His Caliban and Silence in King Henry IV were excellent. His Ralph in the Maid of the Mill by Bickerstaffe, Dougal in Rob Roy (another adaptation by Terry) and Hodge in Love in a Village were unsurpassable performances.

In the New Monthly Magazine, October 1821, a writer, assumably Talfourd, says Emery:

"is one of the most real, hearty, and fervid of actors. He is half a Munden. … He has the pathos but not the humour, the stoutness but not the strangeness, the heart but not the imagination of the greatest of living comedians. … To be half a Munden is the highest praise we can give to any other actor, short of a Kean or a Macready".

Hazlitt says of his acting: "It is impossible to praise it sufficiently because there is never any opportunity of finding fault with it", and Leigh Hunt says he does not know one of his rustic characters "in which he is not altogether excellent and almost perfect".

In the London Magazine, iii. 517, his Tyke is declared inimitable, and his acting is said to remind the writer of a bottle of old port, and to possess "a fine rough and mellow flavour that forms an irresistible attraction". Gilliland's Dramatic Synopsis, says Emery's delineation of Orson in Colman's The Iron Chest is "a fine picture of savage nature characterised by a peculiar justice of colouring". Emery was about five feet nine inches, robustly built, with a light complexion and light blue eyes. He looked like one of his own farmers, sang well with a low tenor voice, composed the music and words of a few songs, and for his benefit wrote annually comic effusions, one of which, a song entitled York, you're wanted, enjoyed a long reputation.

He had considerable powers of painting, and exhibited between 1801 and 1817 nineteen pictures, chiefly sea pieces, at the Royal Academy. He was a shrewd observer, an amusing companion, and a keen sportsman, very fond of driving four-in-hand. Unfortunately he drank to excess, and was never so happy as when in the society of jockeys and pugilists.

== Selected roles ==
- Crafty in Life by Frederick Reynolds (1800)
- John Grouse in The School for Prejudice by Thomas Dibdin (1801)
- Acorn in The Will for the Deed by Thomas Dibdin (1804)
- Andrew Bang in Who Wants a Guinea? by George Colman the Younger (1805)
- Solace in Begone Dull Care by Frederick Reynolds (1808)
