= The Siege of St Quintin =

1808 play

- Original language: English
- Written by: Theodore Hook
- Genre: Historical
- Setting: St. Quentin, France 1557

Premiere
- Date: 10 November 1808
- Place: Theatre Royal, Drury Lane, London

The Siege of St Quintin is an 1808 historical play by the British writer Theodore Hook. It is inspired by the 1557 Battle of St. Quentin. Its theme of a past Anglo-Spanish victory over the French was in line with British support for modern Spain in the Peninsular War following its invasion by Napoleonic forces the same year. It premiered at the Theatre Royal, Drury Lane on 10 November 1808. Revisions were made by Richard Brinsley Sheridan and his son Thomas Sheridan, part of the management of Drury Lane. The original Drury Lane cast included Robert William Elliston as Count Egmont, James William Wallack as Theodore, John Braham as Everard, Vincent De Camp as Bertrand, Harriet Siddons as Adriana, John Henry Johnstone as Sir Leinster Kildare, Walter Maddocks as Captain McIntyre, William Penley as Jack, Thomas Cooke as Sergeant Sturdy, John Duruset as singer, Matilda Ray as Rosa De Valmont and Charlotte Tidswell as Margaret. Accompanying music was composed by James Hook.

== Bibliography ==
- Nicoll, Allardyce. A History of Early Nineteenth Century Drama 1800-1850. Cambridge University Press, 1930.
- Valladares, Susan. Staging the Peninsular War: English Theatres 1807-1815. Routledge, 2016.
