= Lovers' Vows =

1798 play by Elizabeth Inchbald

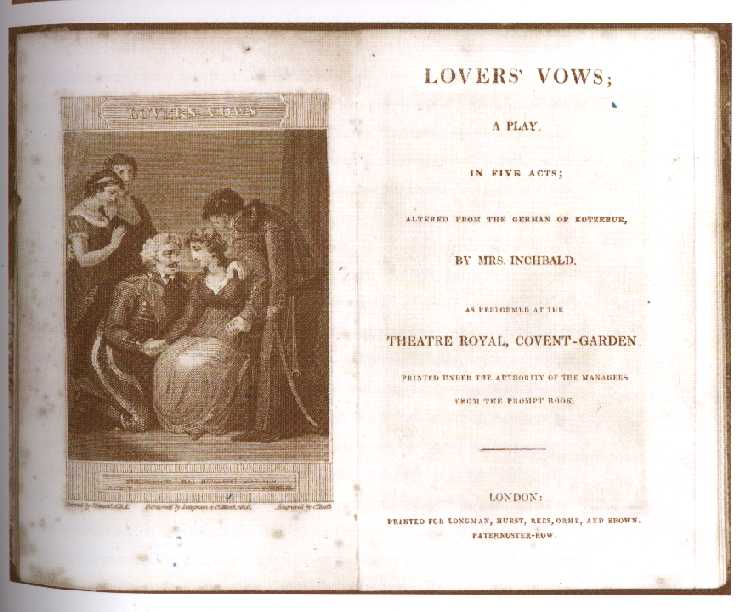
Title page of Elizabeth Inchbald's Lovers' Vows (London: Longman, Hurst, Rees, Orme, and Brown, 1796)

Lovers' Vows, a 1798 play by Elizabeth Inchbald, arguably best known now for having been featured in Jane Austen's novel Mansfield Park (1814), is one of at least four adaptations of August von Kotzebue's Das Kind der Liebe (1790; literally "The Love Child," often translated as "Natural Son"), all of which were published between 1798 and 1800. Inchbald's version is the only one to have been performed. Dealing as she does with sex outside marriage and illegitimate birth, Inchbald in the Preface to the published version declares herself to have been highly sensitive to the task of adapting the original German text for "an English audience." Even so, she left the setting as Germany.

== First production ==
The play was first performed at Covent Garden on Thursday, 11 October 1798, and was an immediate success: it ran for forty-two nights, "making it by some distance Covent Garden's most successful venture of that season," and went on to be performed in Bristol, Newcastle, Bath, and elsewhere. It was likewise successful as a print publication, though it also aroused controversy about its "levelling" politics and moral ambiguity. Anne Plumptre, who translated Kotzebue's play as The Natural Son, wrote (perhaps not disinterestedly as the production of Inchbald's work effectively precluded the production of her own) that Inchbald had transformed the character of Amelia into a "forward country hoyden." Others, however, defended the morality of the play. And indeed, various characters indulge in considerable moralizing about charity, honour, and forgiveness.

The play's role in Mansfield Park has kept its name alive. It is cited by commentators as an object of antitheatricality and there has been considerable debate as to Austen's own views about the acceptability of the play.

== Original cast ==
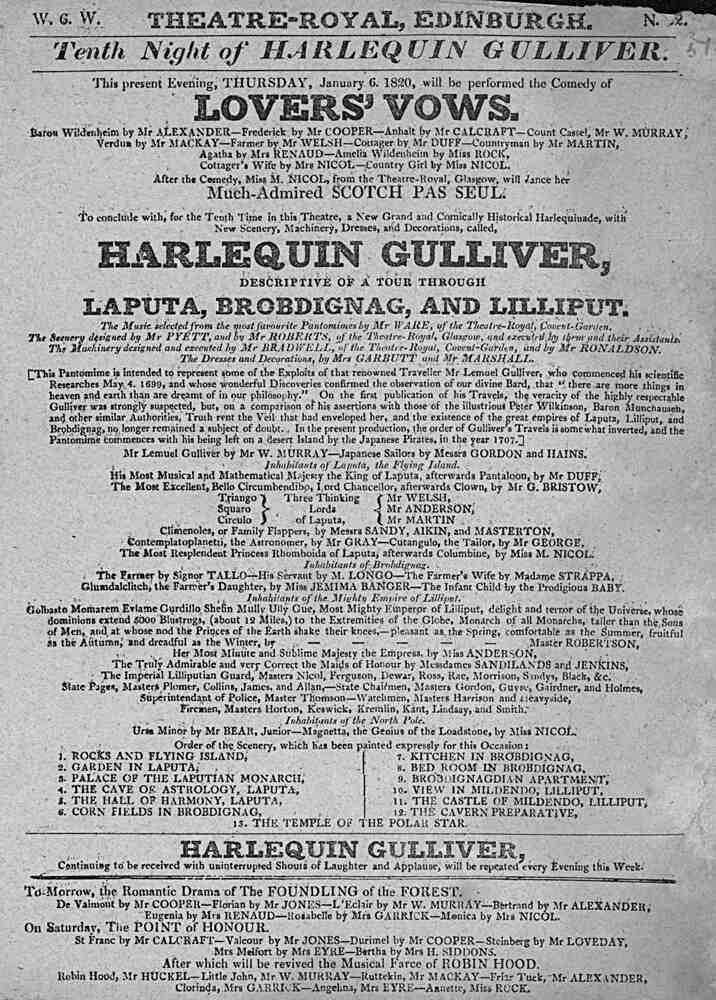
Playbill for performance of Lovers' Vows at the Theatre Royal, Edinburgh, 1820

As credited in the published version:

- Mr. Murray as Baron Wildenhaim
- Mr. Knight as Count Cassel
- Mr. H. Johnston as Anhalt
- Mr. Pope as Frederick
- Mr. Munden (1758-1832) as Verdun the Butler
- Mr. Thompson as the Landlord
- Mr. Davenport as the Cottager
- Mr. Rees as the Farmer
- Mr. Dyke as the Countryman
- Mrs. Johnson as Agatha Friburg
- Mrs. H. Johnston as Amelia Wildenhaim
- Mrs. Davenport as the Cottager's Wife
- Miss Leserve as the County Girl
- Huntsmen, Servants, &c.

== Synopsis ==
Act I: The play opens with Agatha being ejected from an inn when her money runs out. Too proud to beg, she is desperate. Frederick enters, sees her, and offers her money although it will mean he cannot pay for his own breakfast. She recognizes him as her son, absent for five years as a soldier. He has returned in order to find his birth certificate, which he needs in order to find employment. Distraught, Agatha tells him that there is no certificate; she was seduced at the age of seventeen by Baron Wildenhaim with a promise of marriage. Despite the resulting pregnancy, the Baron broke his promise and married another, wealthier woman. Agatha, turned out of her home, struggled to make ends meet and raise her son alone. Frederick is dismayed, and he arranges for his destitute mother to stay with some charitable cottagers.

Act II: Frederick leaves, intending to beg for money. Not knowing her relationship to him, the cottagers tell Agatha of the recent history of Baron Wildenhaim, now widowed and with a daughter. She faints.

Meanwhile, reluctant to force her inclination as his own was forced, the Baron tries to determine whether or not his daughter, Amelia, loves the affected and foppish Count Cassel. It becomes clear to the audience that she instead loves Anhalt, a poor clergyman, and he her. It also becomes clear that the Baron regrets the misdeeds of his youth and has long sought, fruitlessly, to make amends.

Act III: Frederick, desperate as his begging has been unsuccessful, attempts to rob the Baron and the Count as they go hunting, not knowing who they are. He is arrested.

Anhalt speaks to Amelia about matrimony, at the Baron's request, but she in turn confesses her love for him and forces his own confession. They are interrupted by Verdun, a versifying butler, with the news of Frederick's attack on the Baron. The Baron enters and Amelia pleads for the life of the unknown young man, but the Baron is adamant on the grounds that an example must be made.

Act IV: Amelia takes Frederick food and he discovers who it was that he had threatened. He asks to meet the Baron privately.

Amelia reveals to her father what she has learned from Verdun about the Count's sexual immorality. The Baron confronts the Count; he replies that he is a man of the world, and reminds the Baron that many men have behaved likewise. Confused and embarrassed, the Baron dismisses him. Amelia re-enters and reveals her love for Anhalt. They are interrupted by Anhalt, who tells the Baron that Frederick is in the next room and wants a private interview. Frederick reveals their relationship to the Baron, and then leaves. The Baron is much affected.

Act V: Anhalt goes to Agatha at the cottage and explains some circumstances which mitigate the Baron's prior conduct.

Frederick, and then Anhalt, insist to the Baron that he must marry Agatha. After some agitation due to the social difference between them, he agrees, and grateful to Anhalt for his advice, agrees also to let him marry Amelia, despite his poverty. Agatha enters the room and all are reconciled.
