= Thomas Abthorpe Cooper =

American actor

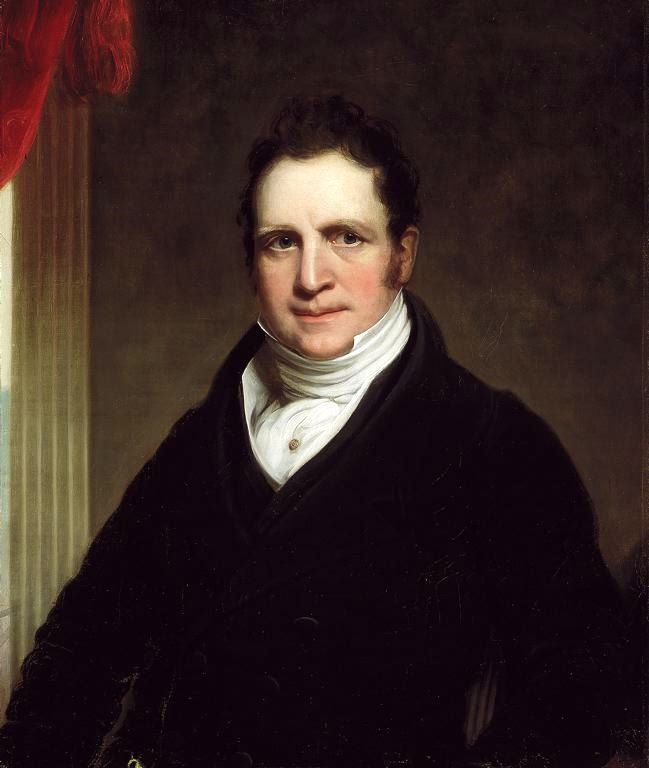
Cooper circa 1822, painting by Chester Harding

Thomas Abthorpe Cooper (born London, England, 1776 – died Bristol, Pennsylvania, 21 April 1849) was an English actor.

Cooper was born in Harrow on the Hill, London, the son of a physician with the East India Company. He received a good education, and, on the death of his father, was adopted by Thomas Holcroft and William Godwin.

His first appearance on the stage was with Stephen Kemble's company in Edinburgh, and later he acted at Covent Garden, London, with great success as Hamlet and Macbeth. In December 1796, he made his first appearance in Philadelphia as Macbeth at the Chestnut Street Theatre, and in August of the following year played in the Greenwich Street Theatre, New York, as Pierre in Venice Preserved. He returned to England in 1802, and for several years held a foremost rank on the English stage.

In 1804, he returned to New York and soon afterward, for a long time, became lessee of the Park Theatre. Later he again visited England, but soon returned to the United States, where he continued to play until advanced in years. As his daughter, Priscilla, married Robert Tyler, eldest son of President John Tyler, he held various public offices, among which were that of military storekeeper in Frankford, Pennsylvania, during 1841, and later the office of surveyor to the ports of New York and Philadelphia. Cooper had great natural endowments of person and voice, but did not excel as a student. His acting was of the school of John Philip Kemble, whom he bid fair to rival in his early days.
