= Speed the Plough =

1800 play by Thomas Morton

- 1807 edition
- Written by: Thomas Morton
- Original language: English
- Genre: Comedy
- Setting: England, present day

Premiere
- Date premiered: 8 February 1800
- Place premiered: Theatre Royal, Covent Garden, London

Speed the Plough is a five-act comedy by Thomas Morton, written in 1798 and first performed in 1800 at the Theatre Royal, Covent Garden to great acclaim. It is mostly remembered today for the sake of the unseen character, Mrs Grundy. The original Covent Garden cast included Alexander Pope as Sir Philip Blandford, Charles Murray as Morrington, Joseph Munden as Sir Abel Handy, John Fawcett as Bob Handy, Henry Erskine Johnston as Henry, Thomas Knight as Farmer Ashfield, George Davenport as Evergreen, John Waddy as Gerald, Charles Klanert as Handy's Servant, Mary Ann Davenport as Dame Ashfield and Nannette Johnston as Miss Blandford. The Irish premiere took place at the Crow Street Theatre in Dublin on 21 February 1800.

The play may have been inspired by August Kotzebue's Graf von Burgund ("The Count of Burgundy"), which had recently failed at the same theatre. Kotzebue's more serious play also concerns a young man named Henry who is ignorant of his own origins.

== Plot summary ==
=== Act 1 ===
Mrs Ashfield is at the market when she is approached by a handsome young nobleman who gives her a letter to deliver to her husband. When Mr Ashfield reads it, he finds that it is from his daughter Susan, and he is astonished to learn that their former servant-girl, the middle-aged woman Nelly, has just married Sir Abel Handy. The gardener Mr Evergreen arrives to tell them that his master, Sir Philip Blandford, has just returned from twenty years abroad to have his daughter marry the son of Sir Abel Handy, Robert. Mr Ashfield starts for Sir Philip's castle to receive Sir Abel and his son.

Sir Abel arrives, encumbered by his inventions, and unrolls a plan of the castle, which his son will receive from Sir Philip as a dowry. Mr Ashfield points out the many problems with the tumbledown place, but the enterprising Sir Abel is untroubled, and mentions that he plans to further local agriculture by holding a ploughing match, so that his jack-of-all-trades son Robert can demonstrate his father's newly invented plough. Robert turns up, and his father asks him why he did not meet him in London. Robert says that he did not wish to disturb him on his honeymoon. He then playfully spars with Mr Ashfield.

Two strangers, Morrington and Gerald, confer in a grove. The ploughman Henry, who is following them, overhears the sentence "The infant certainly died with its mother" which he has reason to think refers to himself: he has no knowledge of his own ancestry. He asks Mr Evergreen about this, but the gardener responds that he is sworn to silence, and warns him to avoid Sir Philip forever after.

=== Act 2 ===
Robert Handy soliloquizes about his dilemma: whether to marry Miss Blandford (for money) or Susan Ashfield (for love). He encounters Mrs Ashfield, who is making lace, and wishing to demonstrate his skill at all tasks he sits down to show her the "Mechlin method", causing Sir Abel much embarrassment when he arrives with Miss Blandford. However, she is not bothered, and they are soon happily absorbed in conversation about London. After a few minutes, Mr Ashfield comes to tell his wife that their daughter has returned home with Lady Handy, and also to warn Sir Abel that his wife has "ordered" him to come too.

At the house of the Ashfields, the parents embrace Susan and initially overlook Lady Handy, their former servant. They are puzzled by Nelly's makeup, which Mr Ashfield compares to the paint which he uses to identify his sheep. Susan leaves to prepare a room for Lady Handy. When Robert Handy arrives, his new stepmother curtsies to him and he tries to correct her manner of doing so. Sir Abel hands her a fan and, when she fans herself, Robert again tries to demonstrate the correct manner. She storms off. When Susan comes back into the room, Robert privately hands her a letter.

A countryman turns up to tell them that the ploughing contest is about to begin. In the parlour, Mr and Mrs Ashfield discuss the letter they saw Robert give Susan. They are interrupted by Henry, who borrows Mr Ashfield's best plough for the contest, in the hope of meeting Sir Philip; then they see Susan crying as she locks away the letter she has received. In her absence, they unlock the box, but cannot bring themselves to read the letter, and put it back. When they ask her about it, she will only say that Robert had previously declared his love for her, and she was not unmoved, but that the letter was disgraceful to him.

The contest is won by Henry, as Robert completely loses control of his horses, and Miss Blandford takes Henry's hand for the dance.

=== Act 3 ===
Inside the castle, Mr Evergreen tells Sir Philip that Henry has agreed never to meet him. But when Sir Philip's daughter talks about the ploughing contest, she accidentally lets slip the fact that she is in love with someone other than Robert and, on meeting him, Sir Philip realizes that it is Henry. He demands Henry leave immediately and never return.

Sir Philip tells his daughter some of the story of his past. As a young man on the Continent, he gambled all his possessions away to a masked man named Morrington; he began a new life, marrying a woman of humble birth, but the day after their wedding they received an anonymous packet containing ten thousand pounds. Twenty years later, his wife died, and his daughter received an offer of marriage from Sir Abel; when he returned to England he was surprised to discover that no-one claims his castle, and he wonders whether Morrington has died without claiming it, or simply awaits his return for the sake of inflicting a greater humiliation.

Sir Philip meets Mr Ashfield and promises to forgive a 150-pound debt if he will turn out Henry. Mr Ashfield refuses.

=== Act 4 ===
Morrington and Gerald turn up at the Ashfields' house and present a bond worth one thousand pounds to Henry, asking him to take it to Sir Philip to settle Mr Ashfield's debts, and accept the rest of its value for himself. But when Henry does so, he learns that Morrington was the man who ruined Sir Philip and he tears up the bond in Sir Philip's presence. The old man exclaims "Blandford" and Henry guesses that it is his original surname. Sir Philip says that he will say nothing more, ever, unless Henry leaves immediately.

After Henry's departure, Robert comes and tells Sir Philip that his father is busy renovating the east wing of the castle. Sir Philip panics and demands that they leave immediately. He shows Robert a portrait of his brother, and confesses that he stabbed him twenty years before on discovering him kissing his fiancée: this was why he had fled to the Continent.

=== Act 5 ===
Robert immediately goes to Susan Ashfield and asks for her hand in marriage. Sir Abel is astonished, but then Gerald approaches him and asks if he will pay five thousand pounds to be rid of his own tempestuous wife. Gerald, it turns out, was Lady Handy's first husband, whom she thought dead after his disappearance twenty years ago.

Sir Abel accidentally sets fire to the castle during a science experiment. Henry rescues Miss Blandford, then rushes back to the ruins to search the east wing, where he finds a knife and a bloody cloth. He confronts Sir Philip, who confesses that Henry's father was the brother he thinks he murdered. At this point, Morrington enters the scene and uncovers his face to Sir Philip. "Morrington" is in fact Sir Philip's brother, who survived the attempt on his life, and revenged himself at the card table, only to be filled with remorse ever after.

== Bibliography ==
- Gilbert, Nora. Better Left Unsaid: Victorian Novels, Hays Code Films, and the Benefits of Censorship. Stanford University Press, 2013.
- Greene, John C. Theatre in Dublin, 1745-1820: A Calendar of Performances, Volume 6. Lexington Books, 2011.
- Nicoll, Allardyce. A History of English Drama 1660–1900: Volume IV. Cambridge University Press, 2009.
- Sutcliffe, Barry (ed.) Plays by George Colman the Younger and Thomas Morton: Inkle and Yarico, The Surrender of Calais, The Children in the Wood, Blue Beard or Female Curiosity, Speed the Plough. CUP Archive, 1983.
