= Ann Maria Bradshaw =

English actress & vocalist (1801–1862)

Ann Maria Bradshaw (1801–1862), was an English actress and vocalist.

Born Ann Maria Tree in London in August 1801, her father lived in Lancaster Buildings, St. Martin's Lane, was in the East India House. Her sister was the actress Ellen Tree. After a training in the chorus at Drury Lane Theatre, and a short experience in Bath, she appeared in 1818 at Covent Garden Theatre as Rosina in 'The Barber of Seville.' Subsequently, she played, principally as a substitute for Miss Foote or Miss Stephens, Patty in 'The Maid of the Mill,' Susannah in 'The Marriage of Figaro,' and other similar characters.

Her first recorded appearance in an original role seems to have been as Princess Stella in the 'Gnome King,' a spectacular piece produced on 6 October 1819 at Covent Garden. On 11 December of the same year she appeared as Luciana in an opera founded by Reynolds on 'The Comedy of Errors.' This led to the series of Shakespearean performances on which her fame rests. In various renderings, musical and otherwise, of Shakespearean comedy, she played with success Ariel, Viola, Imogen, Julia (in the 'Two Gentlemen of Verona'), Ophelia, and Rosalind.

With the exception of a solitary appearance at Drury Lane in April 1823, when she was lent by her own management, she appears to have remained at Covent Garden till her retirement. This took place on 15 June 1825 in two of her original characters, Mary Coppin in Charles the Second by John Howard Payne, and Clari in the opera of that name, by the same author. Shortly afterwards she married, under passably romantic circumstances, and after, it is said, an attempt at suicide, James Bradshaw, a man of property, they had a daughter, Harriet Maria. She died on 18 February 1862. Of medium stature and pleasing figure, and with no special claim to beauty, she owed her popularity to the pathos in her voice. Though inferior to her singing, her acting won commendation. She was much praised for the modesty of her performance in male attire. Her sister, Ellen Tree, married Mr. Charles Kean.
