= Thomas S. Hamblin =

British actor (1800–1853)

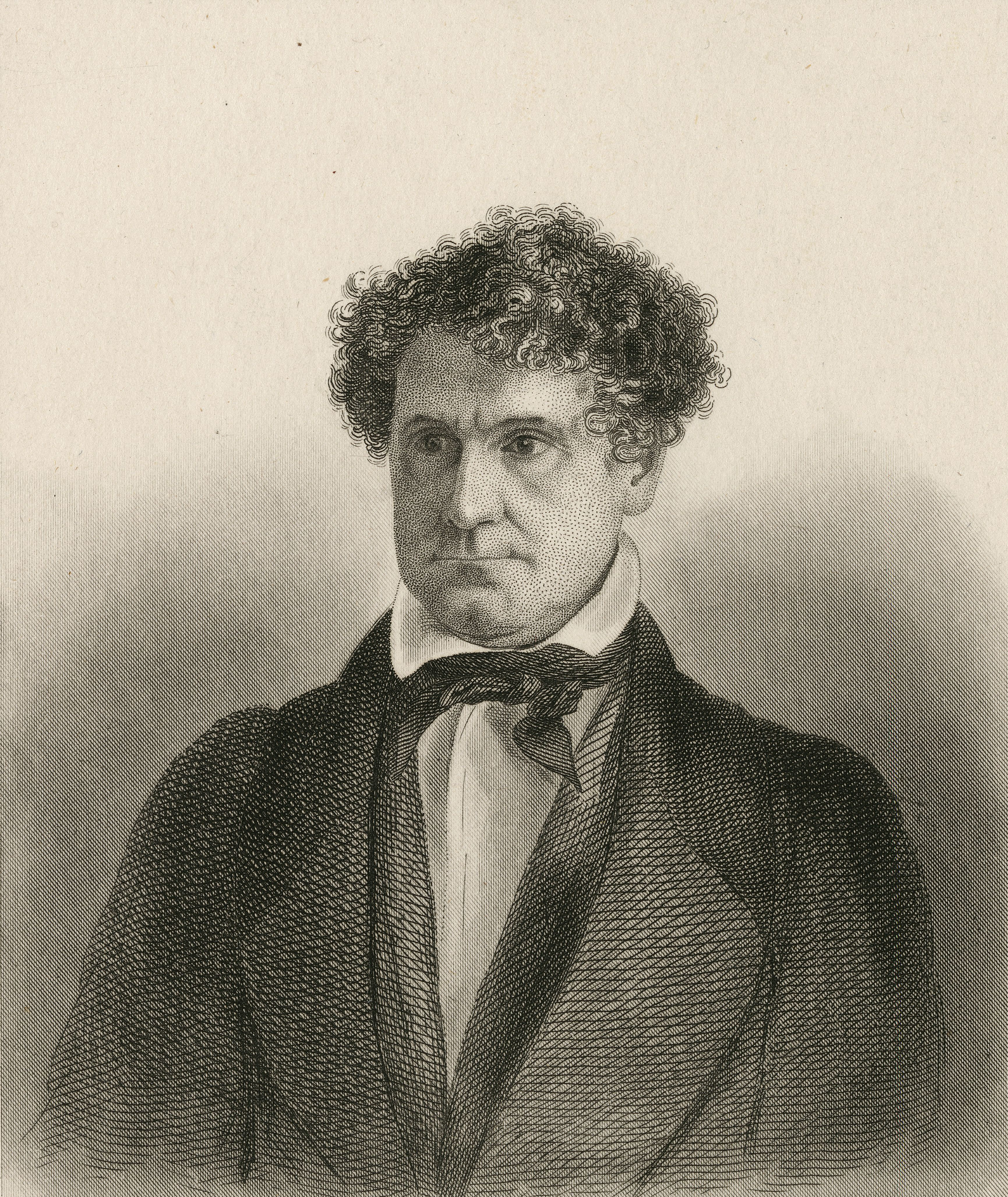
- Print of Thomas S. Hamblin, mid 19th century
- Born: 14 May 1800
- Died: 8 January 1853 (aged 52)
- Occupation: Actor
- Spouse(s): Elizabeth Blanchard (m. 18??; div. 1834) Elizabeth Mary Ann Trewar Shaw (m. 1849)

Thomas Souness Hamblin (14 May 1800 – 8 January 1853) was an English actor and theatre manager. He first took the stage in England, then immigrated to the United States in 1825. He received critical acclaim there, and eventually entered theatre management. During his tenure at New York City's Bowery Theatre he helped establish working-class theatre as a distinct form. His policies preferred American actors and playwrights to British ones, making him an important influence in the development of early American drama.

Although he was known as a fair (if shrewd) businessman, Hamblin's reputation was marred by his well-known womanising and brawling. He had affairs with several up-and-coming actresses at his theatre, and he assaulted at least two newspaper editors who had published unflattering stories about him. His behaviour eventually cost him his first wife and resulted in one conviction for assault.

== Early life and stage career ==
Hamblin was born in Pentonville, England. He apprenticed in a London business but changed course after a successful performance as Hamlet in a school production. By 1815, he had made his professional debut as a ballet dancer at London's Adelphi Theatre. He toured the British Isles over the next eight years, performing at venues such as the Drury Lane Theatre (for manager Stephen Kemble) and Sadler's Wells Theatre. He married Elizabeth Blanchard, a popular actress and daughter of actor William Blanchard and half-sister of actor/playwright E. L. Blanchard. Hamblin had two children by his first wife: William Henry Hamblin Jr. (stage name "Thomas Hamblin Jr") and Elizabeth "Betsey" Hamblin.

Despite some success he had still not established himself with the London critics when, in 1825, Hamblin and his wife left England for the United States. Hamblin took the stage at New York's Park Theatre in early November, where he tackled a number of roles: Hamlet, Macbeth, Othello, Petruchio, Pierre, Rolla, the Stranger, William Tell, and Virginius. Later that month, he appeared opposite Edwin Forrest at the Albion Theatre.

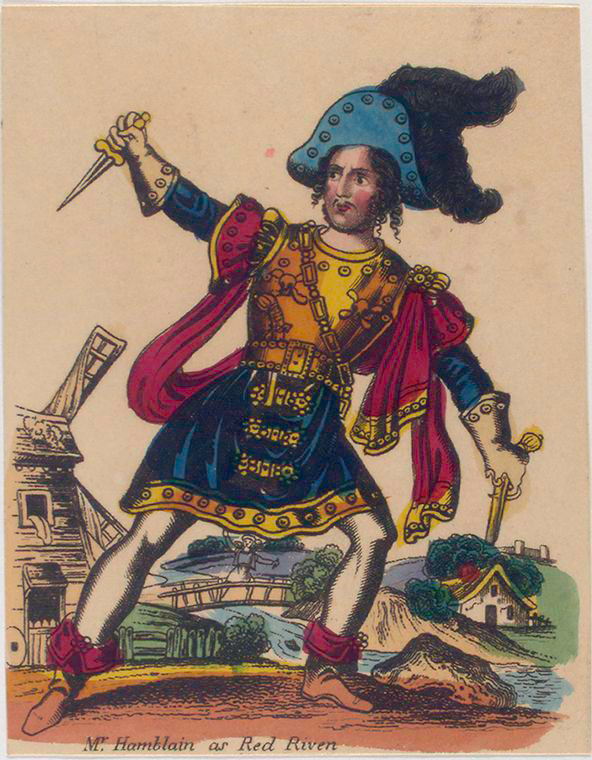
Hamblin as Red Riven

Critics praised Hamblin; the Albion calling him "a very excellent actor". Theatre historian T. Allston Brown attributed his success to these factors:

As an actor, he possessed the valuable accessories of a fine person, a good voice, and careful education. . . . In person he was tall and commanding, but so admirably proportioned as in a measure to conceal his almost towering height. Deep set eyes as black as jet were surmounted by a lofty brow, crowned by clusters of curling dark hair in such rich profusion as is seldom seen, except in some of the models which have been handed down to us from remote antiquity. To see him dressed for Brutus, Coriolanus, or Virginius was a study for a painter.

Francis Wemyss disagreed at least in part, saying that Hamblin's acting was "more than balanced by the husky, disagreeable tones of his voice, which always gave the appearance of hard labour to everything he undertook."

== The Bowery Theatre ==
Hamblin began his tenure as manager of New York's Bowery Theatre with partner James H. Hackett in 1830. Hackett left a month later, and Hamblin obtained the lease and rebuilt when the theatre burnt down later that year. Hamblin catered to the tastes of the rowdy audiences of New York's Bowery district. These "Bowery B'hoys" were working class, primarily male, and socially conservative., and Hamblin accordingly staged blackface performances, circus acts, English farce, American melodrama, and Shakespeare to please them. Hamblin himself preferred upper-class entertainments like ballet and opera; nevertheless, he relegated these to infrequent bookings. Under Hamblin, American working-class theatre, emphasising brilliant spectacle and plot-based narrative, emerged as a form in its own right.

Perhaps Hamblin's greatest influence was in his incubation of American talent. He helped start the careers of many young unknowns, and he was not shy about exerting his influence over those who relied upon his patronage. His Bowery featured many big-name talents, including Junius Brutus Booth, Frank Chanfrau, George Washington Dixon, Louisa Lane Drew, Edwin Forrest, Josephine Clifton, Louisa Medina, Thomas D. Rice, and Charles W. Taylor. In 1831, he renamed the playhouse "the American Theatre, Bowery" after an anti-British riot at the Park Theater. The message was clear: The Bowery was the theatre of Native American drama.

Hamblin was careful to cultivate good favour with his patrons outside of the theatre, as well. He regularly provided space to the fire department for their annual ball, for example. On another occasion, he loaned the Bowery's in-house orchestra to a local militia group for one of their functions.

Hamblin's success can also be attributed to his hard-nosed business practices. He advertised extensively, and he pioneered the concept of allowing productions to run for periods as long as a month. In the spring of 1834, he began purchasing shares of the theatre from its owners, the New York Association; within 18 months, he owned a majority. When the Bowery Theatre burnt down in 1836, it was the most popular playhouse in New York City. Hamblin bought out the remaining shares and rented the property to W. E. Dinneford and Thomas Flynn. They oversaw the theatre's reconstruction while Hamblin acted in various venues and took care of his debts. Hamblin rebuilt yet again after a fire in 1838 and returned to active management with a bigger Bowery in May 1839.

In the 1840s, increased competition in New York City prompted Hamblin to stage even more spectacular melodramas and to book more variety entertainment such as minstrel shows and circus acts. After a fire in 1845, Hamblin tried to build a new theatre on Broadway, but local residents opposed the plan. Instead, he rebuilt the Bowery once more. Tastes were becoming more upscale, and Hamblin turned over active management to A. W. Jackson. He faced health problems, and his acting career stalled as his style became outmoded. The Albion reported that

The dignity, the finished and elaborated elocution, and the high artistical execution of that school were occasionally brought most vividly to our remembrance in Mr. HAMBLIN's delineation of Hamlet, weakened however at times . . . by a dash of the melo-dramatic style and the laboured pompousness he has acquired by long practice of his art at the Bowery.

He attempted to extend his revenues by buying the lease to the Park Theatre in the summer of 1848. He renovated the building and reopened in September to mixed reviews. The building burnt down in December.

== Personal life ==
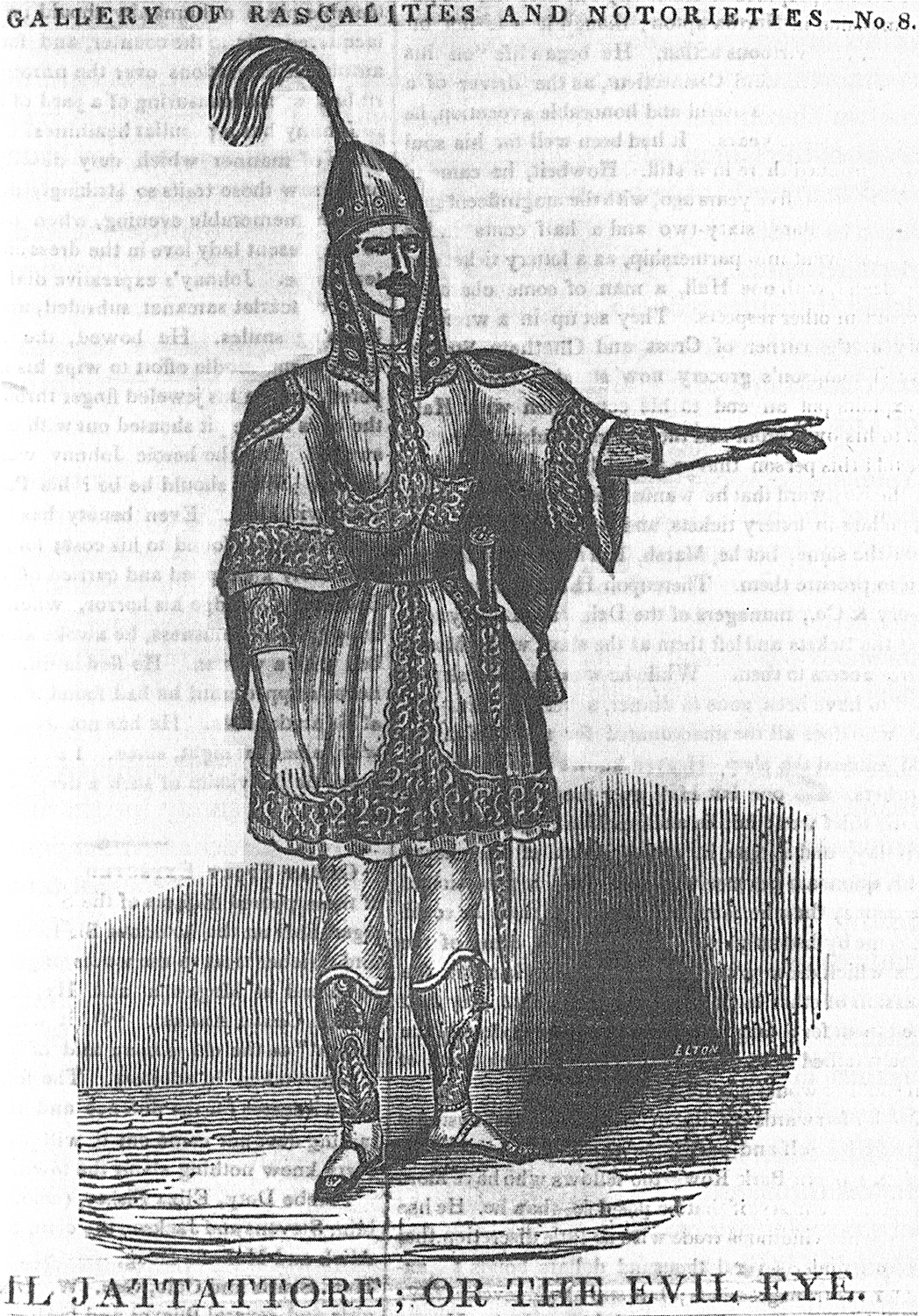
Hamblin was a popular target for newspaper satirists, as evidenced by this engraving in "Gallery of Rascalities and Notorieties—No. 8" in The Flash, 31 October 1841.

Hamblin's personal life was controversial. Although he was "noted for his correct business habits, promptitude, and open-heartedness", he was a well-known philanderer. Newspapers and rumours alleged that he had many sexual affairs. In 1831, his wife filed for divorce after returning from a tour in Europe; this was finalised in 1834 with the condition that Hamblin was not to remarry as long as his ex-wife lived. Hamblin continued his womanising undaunted; he saw a young actress named Naomi Vincent for a time, and she even came to be known as "Mrs. Hamblin". When she died in childbirth in July 1835, Hamblin entered a relationship with playwright Louisa Medina.

He also pugnaciously brooked no opposition. He got into a barroom brawl in October 1834 and once assaulted the editor of the New York Herald, James Gordon Bennett Sr., in his offices. This latter fight led to a two-day trial and Hamblin's conviction in February 1837.

In 1838, newspaper editor and blackface performer George Washington Dixon wrote in his Polyanthos that Hamblin was having an affair with a teen-aged starlet at the Bowery named Miss Louisa Missouri Miller. The girl was found dead within ten days of publication from "inflammation of the brain caused by the violent misconduct of Miss Missouri's mother and the publication of an abusive article in The Polyanthos." The allegation was not out of character, and many people believed it. Hamblin reacted in his usual fashion:

George Washington Buffalo Dixon has this day [28 July 1838] . . . received a most tremendous quilting, at the hands of Thos. S. Hamblin. I have heard no particulars, except that Buff, as editor of The Polyanthos, was severely beaten by Arbaces. It is the only way in which his feelings can be reached.

Hamblin's ex-wife died in 1849, and he married actress Elizabeth Mary Ann Trewar Shaw. They had four more children: Alla, Constance, Edith, and William Snowden Hamblin. Thomas Hamblin died of a "brain fever" (probably cerebral meningitis or cerebral syphilis) in his Broome Street home on 8 January 1853. He left eight heirs, each of whom received US$10,000 (equivalent to $387,000 in 2025) from his estate. He was buried at Ocean Hill, Brooklyn. His family maintained ownership of the Bowery Theatre until 1867.
