= William Blanchard (comedian) =

British actor

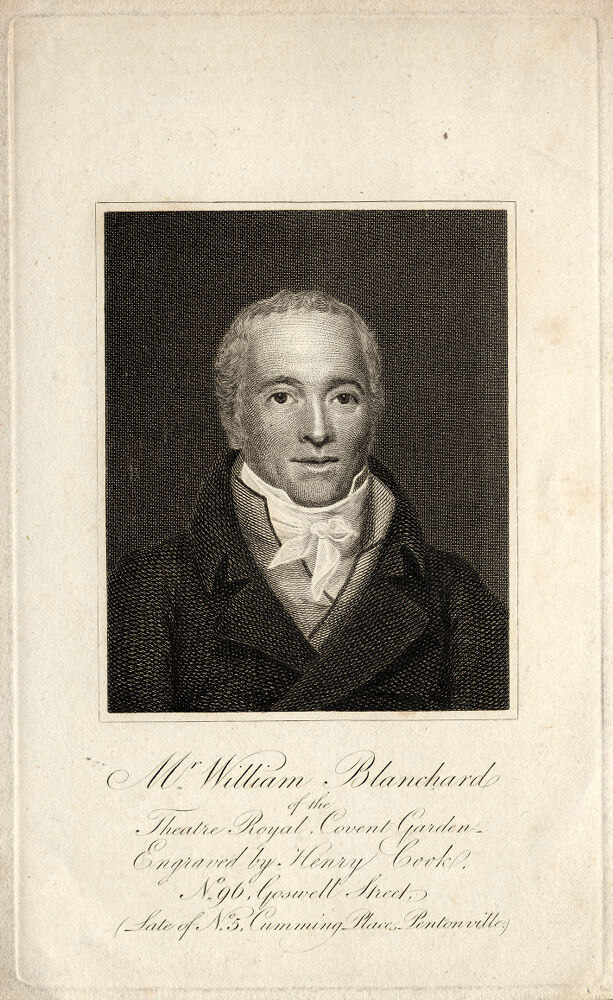
- Born: 2 January 1769; York, England
- Died: 8 May 1835 (aged 66); Chelsea, England
- Occupation: Comedian
- Children: Elizabeth Blanchard, Edward Litt Laman Blanchard

William Blanchard (1769–1835) was an English comedian.

== Early life ==
Blanchard was born in York on 2 January 1769, and for a few years was educated at a private school in that city. Losing both his father, John Blanchard, and his mother, whose maiden name was Clapham, while he was still a child, he was left to the care of his uncle, William Blanchard, long well known as the proprietor of the York Chronicle, by whom he was reared with a tenderness seldom displayed even by a parent. In 1782 he was placed in his uncle's office.

== Early theatrical career ==
He took such delight in Shakespeare that in 1785 he resolved to become an actor. He joined Mr. Welsh's company of travelling comedians at Buxton. His first appearance was as Allan-a-Dale in M'Nally's' Robin Hood.' For four years he played under the name of Bentley, but from 1789 in his own name. He took the parts of Achmet, Douglas, and even Romeo. Asperne, of the European Magazine, wrote of him at that period: 'I knew John Kemble in 1779, and he was not then half so promising a performer as William Blanchard appeared to me in 1790. Blanchard had more fire, more nature, and more knowledge of the stage.'

== Work as a comedian ==
He next became a manager, opening theatres at Penrith, Hexham, Barnard Castle, and Bishop Auckland. He lost money, and joined Mr. Brunton's company of players on the Norwich circuit, and took to comic parts. His first appearance in London was made at Covent Garden on 1 October 1800 as Bob Acres, in which he succeeded remarkably, and as Crack in the musical farce of the 'Turnpike Gate.' By the middle of his second season Mr. Harris cancelled the original arrangement for five years by re-engaging him for seven, with an increased salary. On 15 May 1807 his wife Susan died, leaving him with four children, one Elizabeth became an actress. He performed comical songs at Harper's Gardens, Norwich in August, 1808 and married Sarah Harold on 15 October of the same year. In certain classes of character he secured a position of recognised preeminence. Oxberry (p. 278) calls him 'unquestionably the best drunken man on the stage.' A son William was born in 1811 and another Edward, who also became an actor. At Covent Garden Theatre, saving only for a brief professional visit to America in 1832 (encouraged by daughter Elizabeth's husband Thomas Hamblin), Blanchard remained continuously for thirty-four years. He was especially noted for his Shakespearian impersonations of Fluellen, Sir Hugh Evans, Menenius, and Polonius. According to Leigh Hunt, his best performance was the Marquis de Grand-Château in the musical toy show of the 'Cabinet.' Leigh Hunt also praises highly his Russett in Colman's 'The Jealous Wife.' Similar testimony to his skill is borne by all the best dramatic critics of the time. The last character created by him was that of Counsellor Crowsfoot in Douglas Jerrold's comedy of 'Nell Gwynne,' produced at Covent Garden Theatre on 9 January 1833, which was warmly spoken of in the 'Athenæum,' 12 January 1833.

== Death ==
Blanchard's death occurred very suddenly on 8 May 1835. He died in his sixty-sixth year, and was buried in the graveyard of St Luke's Church, Chelsea. As he was a member of the Covent Garden Theatrical Fund, after his death his widow Sarah was entitled to £40 per annum. She also was left with two sons, survived her husband nearly forty years, dying at the age of eighty-nine on 15 February 1875. Exactly a year and a day after Blanchard's death his uncle died on the very day on which he completed his eighty-seventh year, after having honourably conducted the York Chronicle for sixty years as editor and proprietor.

== Portraits of Blanchard ==
Among the best known portraits of Blanchard in character are two by De Wilde, one representing him as Sir Andrew Aguecheek in 'Twelfth Night,' and the other as the Marquis de Grand-Château. Better known, through engravings of them, are two famous theatrical paintings. In the 'Scene from Love, Law, and Physic,' by George Clint, A.R.A., the original of which is preserved at the Garrick Club, lifelike portraits are introduced of Liston as Lubin Log, Mathews as Flexible, Blanchard as Dr. Camphor, and John Emery as Andrew; while in the scene from the 'Beggar's Opera' the same artist has given all but speaking likenesses of William Blanchard as Peachum, of Mrs. Davenport as Mrs. Peachum, and of Miss Anna Maria Tree as Polly. Blanchard is also shown in the part of Tony Lumpkin in The Life and reminiscences of E.L.Blanchard.
