= Alfred Bunn =

British businessman, librettist

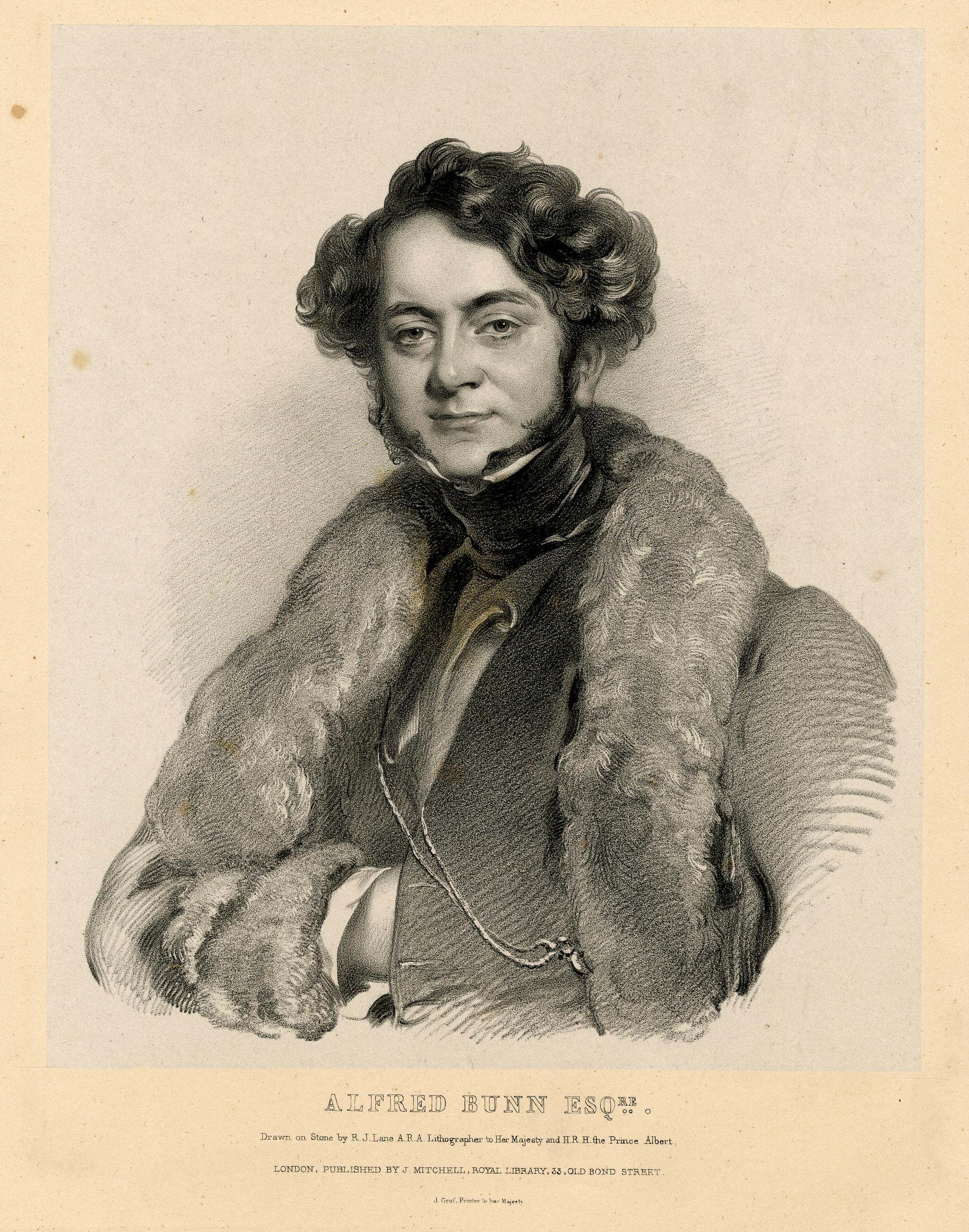
Alfred Bunn, lithograph by Richard Lane

Alfred Bunn (8 April 1796 in London – 20 December 1860 in Boulogne-sur-Mer) was an English theatrical manager. He married Margaret Somerville, a minor actress, in 1819.

== Biography ==
Bunn was appointed stage manager of Drury Lane Theatre, London, in the year 1823. In 1826, he was managing the Theatre Royal in Birmingham, and in 1833 he undertook the joint management of Drury Lane and the Royal Opera House, Covent Garden, London. In this undertaking he met with vigorous opposition. A bill for the abolition of the Patent theatres was passed in the House of Commons, but on Bunn's petition was thrown out by the House of Lords. He had difficulties first with his company, then with the Lord Chamberlain (the official censor), and had to face the keen rivalry of the other theatres.

A longstanding quarrel with William Macready resulted in the tragedian assaulting the manager. In Macready's own words, he walked past Bunn's door and "going up to him as he sat on the other side of the table, I struck him as he rose a backhanded slap across the face. I did not hear what he said, but I dug my fist into him as effectively as I could; he caught hold of me, and got at one time the little finger of my left hand in his mouth, and bit it."

Bunn also quarrelled with the opera singer Jenny Lind, the "Swedish Nightingale", over her contract. According to Lind's biographers, Henry Scott Holland and W. S. Rockstro, the singer "was so terrified at the penalties, the law-suits, and the disgrace with which Mrs. Bunn had threatened her, that her dearest and most trusted friends could not persuade her to entertain the idea of appearing at an English theatre, under any circumstances, or upon any terms whatever." The controversy was recorded by Bunn in his The Case of Bunn Versus Lind.

In 1840, Bunn was declared a bankrupt, but he continued to manage Drury Lane and the Surrey Theatre until 1848 at the age of fifty-two.

Artistically, his control of his English theatres was highly successful. Nearly every leading English actor of the time played under his management, and he made an attempt to establish British opera, producing the principal works of Michael Balfe. He had some gift for writing, and most of the libretti of these operas were translated by him. In The Stage Before and Behind the Curtain (3 vols., 1840), he gave a full account of his managerial experiences.

In James Joyce's Ulysses, the main character Leopold Bloom thinks briefly (and incompletely) of a lyric Bunn wrote: "Whose smile upon each feature plays with such and such replete". The original lyric, from the William Vincent Wallace opera Maritana, is: "Whose smile upon each feature plays with truthfulness replete".

== See also ==
- Owners, lessees and managers of the Royal Opera House, Covent Garden
- Works with text by Mr. Bunn on IMSLP.

== Selected plays ==
- Kenilworth (1821)
- The Minister and the Mercer (1834)
