= Tate Wilkinson =

English actor and manager

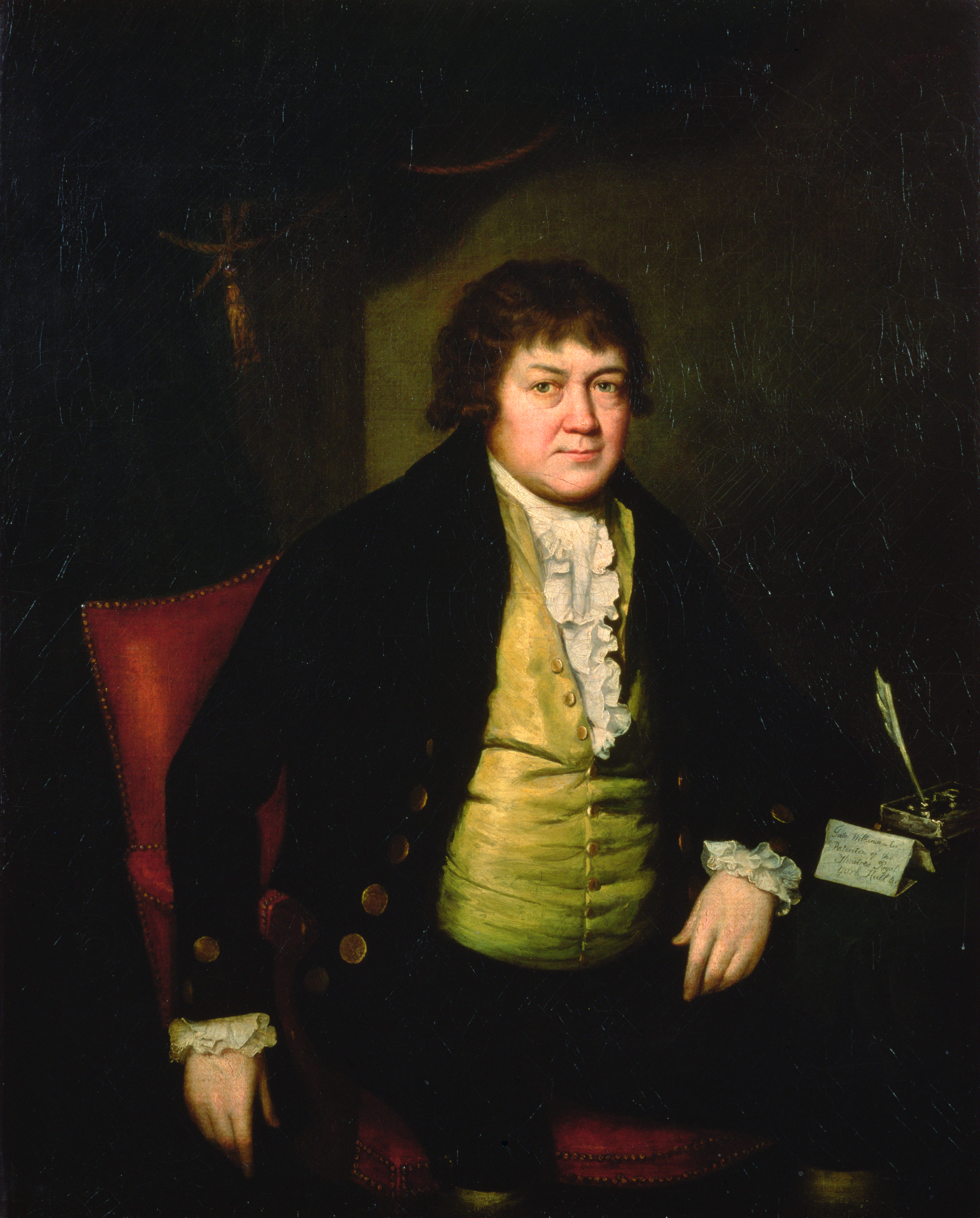
Portrait of Wilkinson, by Stephen Hewson

Tate Wilkinson (27 October 1739 – 16 November 1803) was an English actor and manager.

== Life ==
He was the son of a clergyman and was sent to Harrow.

His first attempts at acting were badly received, and it was to his wonderful gift of mimicry that he owed his success. His imitations, however, naturally gave offence to the important actors and managers whose peculiarities he hit off to the life. Garrick, Peg Woffington, Samuel Foote and Sheridan, after being delighted with the imitations of the others, were among the most angry when it came to their turn, and threatened never to forgive him. Garrick never did.

As an actor, Wilkinson was most successful in Foote's plays, but his list of parts was a long one. In Shakespearian characters he was very popular in the provinces. In 1766 he became a partner of Joseph Baker in the management of several Yorkshire theatres, and married about 1768. He became sole manager after his partner's death in 1770 of a number of theatres on what was then called the Yorkshire Circuit, and he was both liberal and successful. The Theatre, Leeds, built to his order in 1771, was part of the circuit. In 1769 he took over York Theatre Royal, where he also had living quarters. An engraving of him in the role of Mr Popeseye was made; copies can be found in the Murray collection within the York City Archive held at the central York Library. Wilkinson directed with excellent judgment and prosperity for over 30 years. His oddities were notorious, but he was a generous manager.

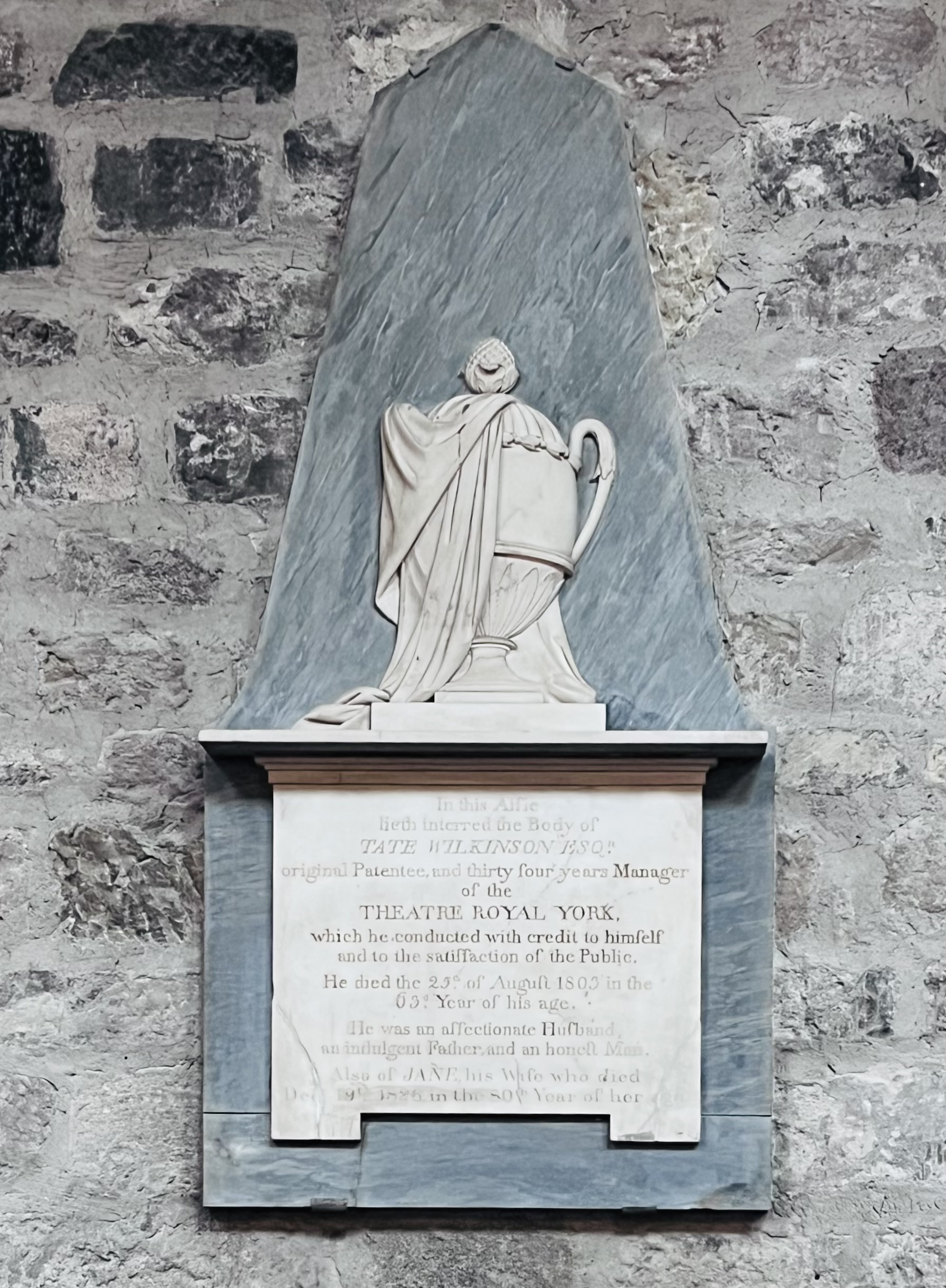
Memorial to Tate Wilkinson in All Saints Pavement church York where he was buried.

See his Memoirs (4 vols, 1790) and The Wandering Patentee (4 vols, 1795).

== Company ==
Among Wilkinson's actors were

- Miss Farren
- Bridge Frodsham
- Julia Glover
- Dorothea Jordan (later mistress of William IV) from 1782 to 1785.
- Elizabeth Satchell
- Mrs. Siddons and the other Kembles
- Dicky Suett
