= Thomas Morton (playwright) =

English playwright (1764–1838)

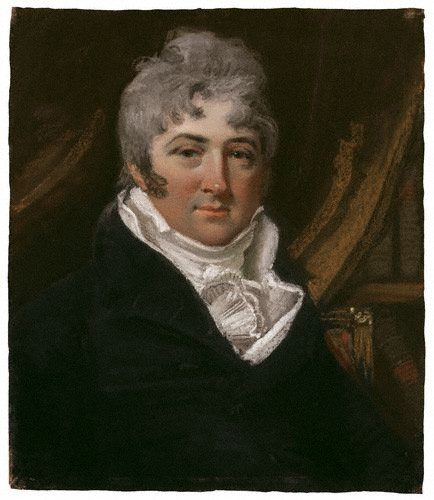
- Portrait (c. 1803), pastel, of Thomas Morton (1764–1838) by John Raphael Smith (1752–1812)
- Born: 1764; Durham, England, Great Britain
- Died: 28 March 1838 (aged 73–74)
- Children: 3
- Writing career
- Genre: Playwright
- Notable work: Speed the Plough

Thomas Morton (1764 – 28 March 1838) was an English playwright.

== Life ==
Morton was born in the city of Durham. He was the youngest son of John and Grace Morton of Whickham, County Durham.

After the death of his father he was educated at Soho Square school at the charge of his uncle Maddison, a stockbroker. Here amateur acting was in vogue, and Morton, who played with Joseph George Holman, acquired a taste for the theatre. He entered at Lincoln's Inn, 2 July 1784, but was not called to the bar.

His first drama, Columbus, or A World Discovered (1792), a historical play in five acts, founded in part upon Les Incas of Marmontel, was produced with success at Covent Garden, 1 December 1792, Holman playing the part of Alonzo. Children in the Wood, a two-act musical entertainment, followed at the Haymarket 1 October 1793. It was well acted by Richard Suett, John Bannister, and Miss De Camp, and was more than once revived.

Zorinski (premiered Haymarket, 20 June 1795) was a three-act play founded on the adventures of Stanislaus. It was quickly renamed to Casimir, King of Poland, and enjoyed considerable success. However, an anonymous pamphlet titled Mr. Morton's "Zorinski" and Brooke's "Gustavus Vasa" Compared (1795) alleged that Morton's play was essentially plagiarized from Henry Brooke's 1738 Gustavus Vasa — Morton's characters Rodomosko, Rosolia, and Zorinski were respectively Brooke's Cristiern, Cristina, and Gustavus; Morton's salt-mines were Brooke's copper-mines, and so on.

The Way to get Married (1796), a comedy in five acts, with serious situations, was produced at Covent Garden 23 January 1796, acted forty-one times, and became a stock piece. It supplied Munden with his favourite character of Caustic. A Cure for the Heart-Ache (1797), a five-act comedy, Covent Garden, 10 January 1797, furnished two excellent characters in Old and Young Rapid, and became also, with few other claims on attention, a stock play. Secrets Worth Knowing (1798), a five-act comedy, Covent Garden 11 January 1798, though a better play than the preceding, was less popular.

Speed the Plough (1798), a five-act comedy, premiered at Covent Garden, 8 Feb. 1798, was acted forty-one times, and was often revived. The Blind Girl, or a Receipt for Beauty, a comic opera in three acts (songs only printed), Covent Garden, 22 April 1801, was played eight times. Beggar my Neighbour, or A Rogue's a Fool, a comedy in three acts (unprinted), Haymarket, 10 July 1802, was assigned to Morton but unclaimed by him, being damned the first night. It was afterwards converted into How to tease and how to please. Covent Garden, 29 March 1810, experienced very little better fortune, and remained unprinted. Part of the plot of Beggar my Neighbour is said to have been taken from August Wilhelm Iffland. The School of Reform, or How to rule a Husband (1805), a five-act comedy, was played with remarkable success at Covent Garden, 15 January 1805, and was revived so late as 20 November 1867 at the St. James's, with Mr. John S. Clarke as Tyke and Mr. Irving as Ferment. Tyke was the greatest part of John Emery.

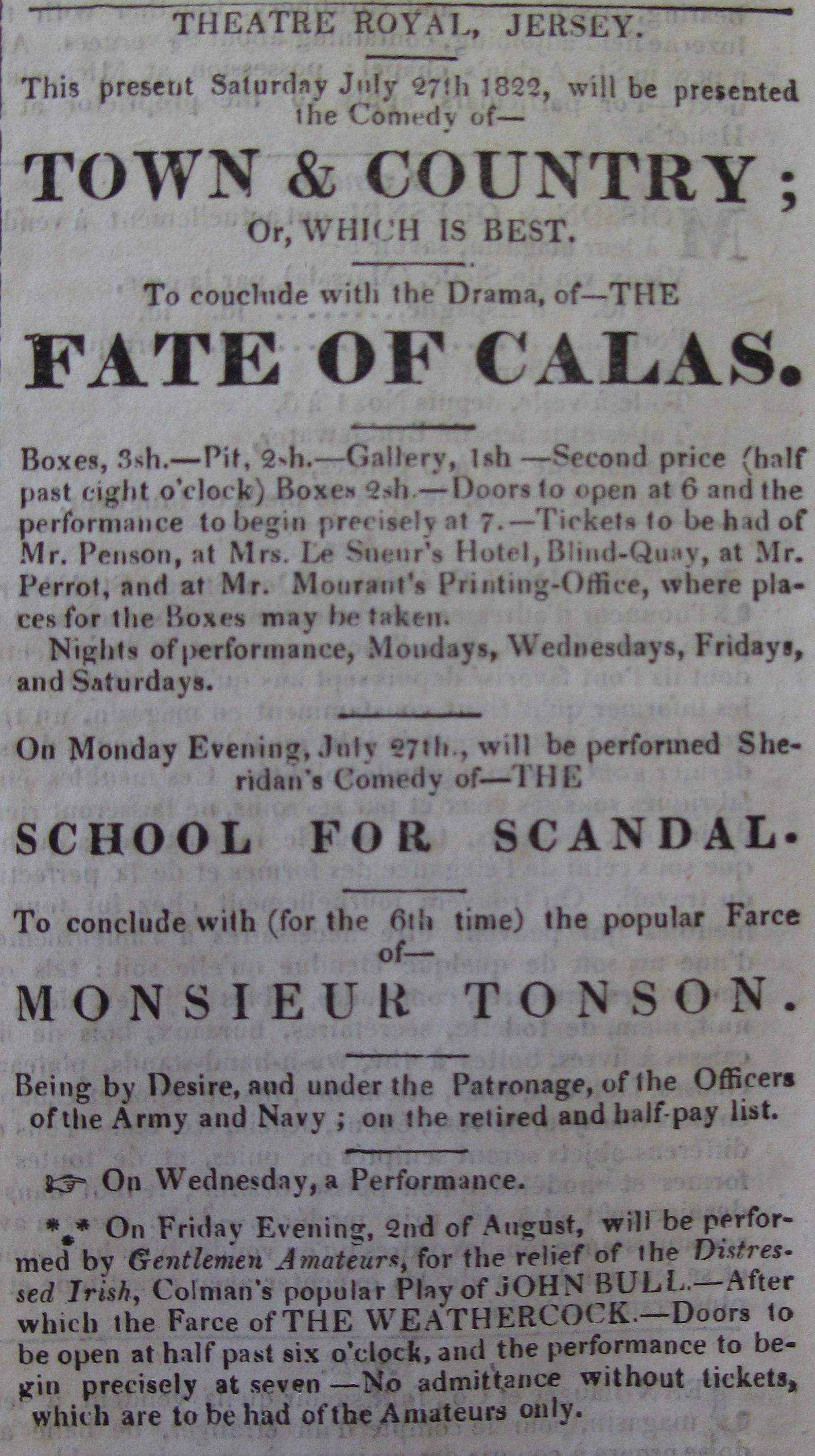
An 1822 advertisement for a performance in Jersey of Town and Country, or Which Is Best?

Town and Country, or Which Is Best? (1807), a comedy in five acts, was given at Covent Garden 10 March 1807, with John Kemble as Reuben Glenroy and Charles Kemble as Plastic. For this piece Harris is said to have paid £1,000 whether it succeeded or failed.

The Knight of Snowdon (1811), a musical drama in three acts, founded on The Lady of the Lake, saw the light at Covent Garden 5 February 1811. Education (1813), a five-act comedy, Covent Garden, 27 April 1813, is taken in part from Iffland. In The Slave (1816), Covent Garden, 12 Nov. 1816, a musical drama in three acts, William Macready played Gambia, the slave. A Roland for an Oliver (1819), produced at Covent Garden 29 April 1819, was a two-act musical farce. In Henri Quatre, or Paris in the Olden Time (1820), Covent Garden, 22 April 1820, a musical romance in three acts, Macready was Henri. At the same theatre appeared School for Grown Children (1827), 9 January 1827, and The Invincibles, 28 February 1828, a musical farce in two acts, included in Cumberland's collection.

With his second son, John Maddison Morton, he was associated in The Writing on the Wall, a three-act melodrama, produced at the Haymarket, and (it is said) in All that Glitters is not Gold, a two-act comic drama first played at the Olympic on 13 January 1851. Judith of Geneva, a three-act melodrama, is assigned him in Buncombe's collection, and Sink or Swim, a two-act comedy, in that of T. H. Lacy.

== Family ==
Morton died on 28 March 1838, leaving a widow and three children, his second son being the farce writer, John Maddison Morton. He was a man of reputable life and regular habits, who enjoyed, two years before his death, the rarely accorded honour of being elected (8 May 1837) an honorary member of the Garrick Club. For much of his life, Thomas lived in Pangbourne in Berkshire.

== Works ==
He wrote about 25 plays, several of which had great popularity, among them Columbus, or a World Discovered (1792); Children in the Wood (1793); Zorinski (1795); The Way to Get Married (1796); A Cure for the Heart Ache (1797); Speed the Plough (1798); Secrets Worth Knowing (1798); The Blind Girl, or A Receipt for Beauty (1801); The School of Reform, or How to Rule a Husband (1805); Town and Country, or Which Is Best? (1807); The Knight of Snowdon (1811); Education (1813); The Slave (1816); Methinks I See My Father (1818); A Roland for an Oliver (1819); Henri Quatre (1820); A School for Grown Children (1827); and The Invincibles (1828). The name of one of the characters in Speed the Plough, Mrs Grundy, has entered the English language as a synonym for "prude".

== Sources ==
- Chambers' Book of Days
