= Charles Murray (Scottish actor) =

Scottish actor and dramatist (1754–1821)

Charles Murray (1754–1821) was a Scottish actor and dramatist.

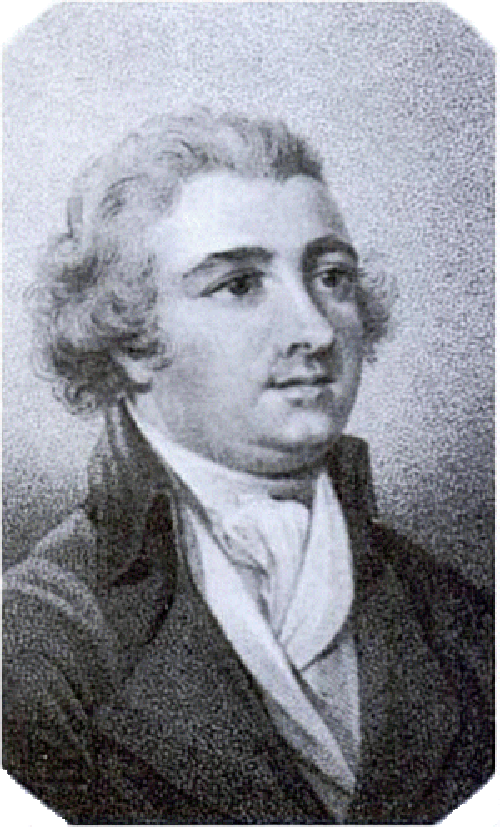
Charles Murray, 1797 engraving

== Life ==
The son of Sir John Murray of Broughton, he was born at Cheshunt in Hertfordshire. He spent some time in France, studied pharmacy and surgery in London, and went surgeon's mate on some Mediterranean voyages.

== Stage career ==
After playing as an amateur in Liverpool Murray went, with an introduction from Younger, the theatre manager there, to Tate Wilkinson of the York circuit. He made his first professional stage appearance at York, under the name of Raymur, and playing Carlos in Love Makes a Man (Colley Cibber). A quarrel in a tavern in Wakefield in September 1776 lost him his position.

After further time at sea Murray acted under his own name with Griffiths at Norwich. On 8 October 1785, as Sir Giles Overreach in A New Way to pay Old Debts, he made his first appearance in Bath. Here he remained until 1796, playing a great variety of parts. His wife Mrs. Murray occasionally played with him, and on 1 July 1793, for the benefit of her father and of her mother, who played Queen Elinor, his young daughter Harriet Murray made her first stage appearance as Prince Arthur. She subsequently played Titania, and on Mrs. Murray's final benefit in Bath on 19 May 1796, Fine Lady in David Garrick's Lethe. On this occasion Murray spoke a farewell address.

== At Covent Garden ==
Murray came to Covent Garden with a good reputation; his first appearance in London took place on 30 September as Shylock, with, it is said, Bagatelle in The Poor Soldier (John O'Keeffe and William Shield). He was found better suited for secondary parts. For his benefit, on 12 May 1798, he was Polixenes in The Winter's Tale, Harriet Murray making, as Perdita, her first appearance in London. He was on 11 October 1798 the original Baron Wildenhaim in Elizabeth Inchbald's Lovers' Vows. In 1802 he played the title role in Matthew Lewis's tragedy Alfonso, King of Castile. Murray's last appearance at Covent Garden appears to have been on 17 July 1817 as Brabantio to the Othello of Charles Mayne Young, the Iago of Junius Brutus Booth, and the Desdemona of Elizabeth O'Neill.

== Last years ==
The Theatrical Inquisitor of February 1817 spoke of Murray as a veteran, and made reference to his infirmities. Threatened with paralysis, he went to Edinburgh to be near his children, Harriet Siddons (Mrs. Henry Siddons) and William Henry Murray, and died there on 8 November 1821.

== Selected roles ==
- Sir Hubert Stanley in A Cure for the Heart Ache by Thomas Morton (1797)
- Sir Oliver Monrath in False Impressions by Richard Cumberland (1797)
- Doctor Gosterman in He's Much to Blame by Thomas Holcroft (1798)
- Baron Wildenhaim in Lovers' Vows by Elizabeth Inchbald (1798)
- Gangrene in The Eccentric Lover by Richard Cumberland (1798)
- Metland in The Wise Man of the East by Elizabeth Inchbald (1799)
- Clevland in The Votary of Wealth by Joseph George Holman (1799)
- Goulding in Five Thousand a Year by Thomas John Dibdin (1799)
- Mr. Bertram in The Birthday by Thomas John Dibdin (1799)
- Morrington in Speed the Plough by Thomas Morton (1800)
- Marchmont in Life by Frederick Reynolds (1800)
- Hermit in Joanna of Montfaucon by Richard Cumberland (1800)
- Counsellor Friendly in The School for Prejudice by Thomas Dibdin (1801)
- Alfonso in Alfonso, King of Castile by Matthew Gregory Lewis (1802)
- Lieutenant Worthington in The Poor Gentleman by George Colman the Younger (1801)
- Sir Herbert Melmoth in Folly as it Flies by Frederick Reynolds (1801)
- Sir Edward Delauny in Delays and Blunders by Frederick Reynolds (1802)
- Major Seymour in The Three Per Cents by Frederick Reynolds (1803)
- Old Man in The School of Reform by Thomas Morton (1805)
- Andreas in Rugantino by Matthew Gregory Lewis (1805)
- Owen Glenroy in Town and Country by Thomas Morton (1807)
- Randall in The Gazette Extraordinary by Joseph George Holman (1811)
- Godfrey in Adelaide by Richard Lalor Sheil (1816)
- Alvarez in The Apostate by Richard Lalor Sheil (1817)

== Notes ==
Attribution

This article incorporates text from a publication now in the public domain: Lee, Sidney, ed. (1894). "Murray, Charles (1754-1821)". Dictionary of National Biography. Vol. 39. London: Smith, Elder & Co.
