= The Three Per Cents =

1803 play

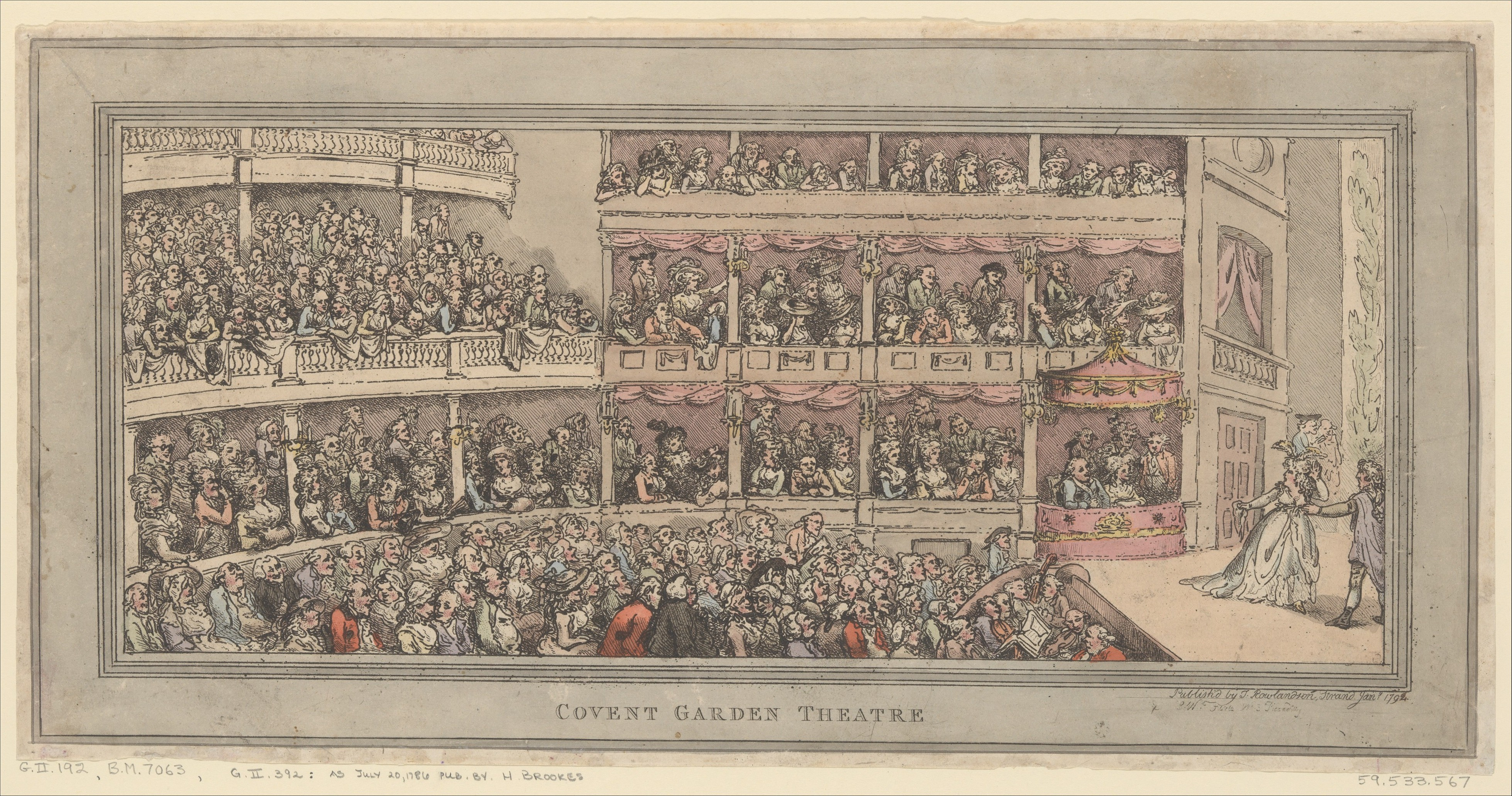
- Covent Garden Theatre
- Original language: English
- Written by: Frederick Reynolds
- Genre: Comedy
- Setting: London, present day

Premiere
- Date: 12 November 1803
- Place: Theatre Royal, Covent Garden, London

The Three Per Cents is an 1803 comedy play by the British writer Frederick Reynolds. It premiered at the Theatre Royal, Covent Garden on 12 November 1803. The original cast included George Frederick Cooke as Sandy McTack, John Fawcett as George McTack, Joseph Shepherd Munden as Sir Peter Presser, Charles Kemble as Colonel Dorimant, Charles Murray as Major Seymour, Samuel Simmons as Pallet, Charles Farley as Witling, Maria Gibbs as Lady Delamere and Harriet Siddons as Rosalie. The title refers to consols, a form of financial investment in the British national debt which returned three percent interest.

== Bibliography ==
- Greene, John C. Theatre in Dublin, 1745-1820: A Calendar of Performances, Volume 6. Lexington Books, 2011.
- Nicoll, Allardyce. A History of English Drama 1660–1900: Volume IV. Cambridge University Press, 2009.
