= Delays and Blunders =

1802 play

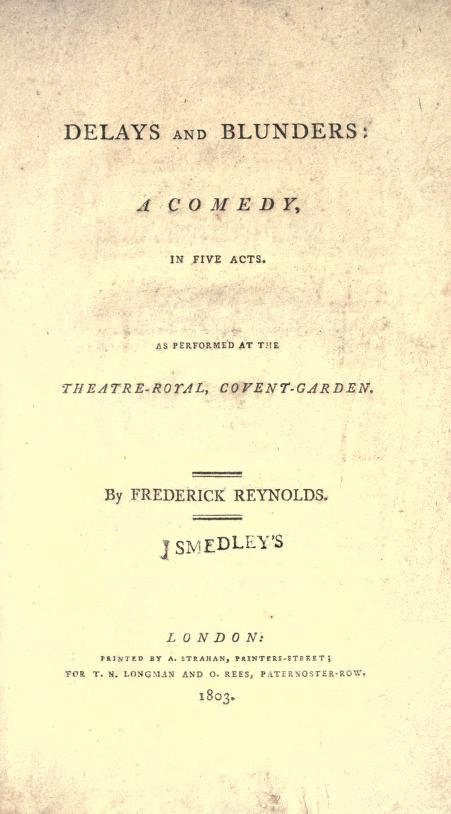
- Original language: English
- Written by: Frederick Reynolds
- Genre: Comedy
- Setting: England, present day

Premiere
- Date: 30 October 1802
- Place: Theatre Royal, Covent Garden, London

Delays and Blunders is an 1802 comedy play by the British writer Frederick Reynolds. It premiered at the Theatre Royal, Covent Garden on 30 October 1802. The original cast included Charles Murray as Sir Edward Delauny, Henry Siddons as Lieutenant St. Orme, Joseph Shepherd Munden as Sapling, William Thomas Lewis as Henry Sapling, John Fawcett as Paul Postpone, Samuel Simmons as Privilege, John Emery as Robert Grange, James Thompson as Farmer Nightshade, George Davenport as Sternly, George Davies Harley as Landlord, Isabella Mattocks as Mrs Sapling, Nannette Johnston as Honoria, Harriett Litchfield as Mrs. St Orme and Harriet Siddons as Lauretta.

== Bibliography ==
- Class, Monika & Robinson, Terry F. Transnational England: Home and Abroad, 1780-1860. Cambridge Scholars Publishing, 2009.
- Greene, John C. Theatre in Dublin, 1745-1820: A Calendar of Performances, Volume 6. Lexington Books, 2011.
- Nicoll, Allardyce. A History of English Drama 1660–1900: Volume IV. Cambridge University Press, 2009.
