= Nannette Johnston =

British stage actress

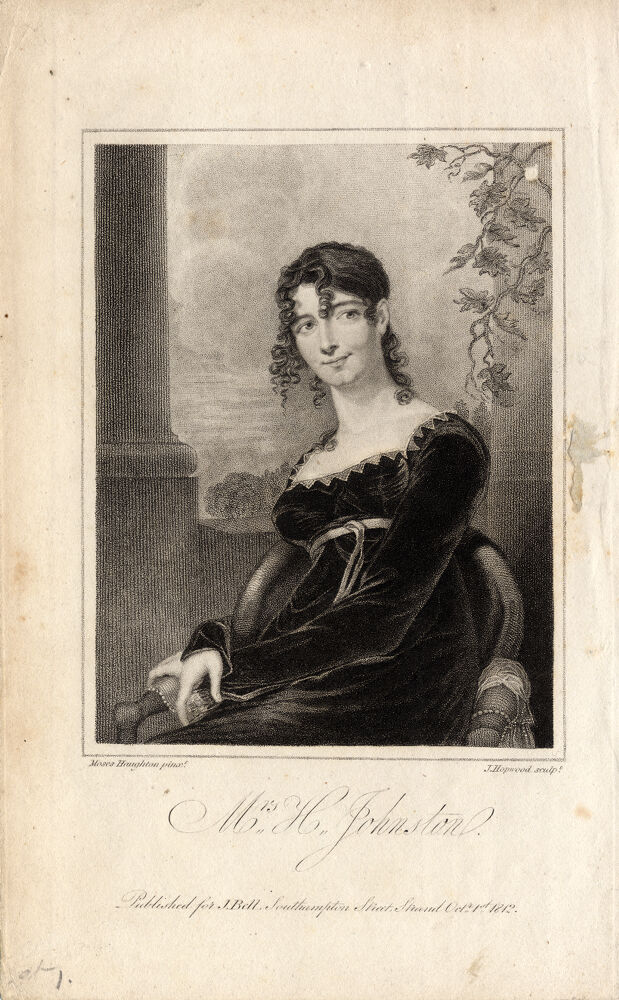
Johnston in 1812.

Nannette Johnston (born 1782) was a British stage actress and dancer active during the Regency era. She was born in London as the daughter the actor William Parker, but educated in Edinburgh where her father was working and began her career as a dancer. In 1796 she married the actor Henry Erskine Johnston, with whom she had six children, and the then went to Dublin for a season before heading to London where she acted at Covent Garden and the Haymarket. They both moved to Drury Lane for two seasons, before returning to Covent Garden.

During a spell in Dublin in 1811 she abandoned her husband, who had been employed by the Peter Street Theatre, and began living with Thomas Harris, the manager of Covent Garden. She in turn left Harris in 1814 for a banker Harry Drummond, after which Harris released her from Covent Garden. She seems to have effectively retired apart from a benefit for the actor William A. Conway in 1816. In 1820 she was granted a divorce from Johnston and was still alive in 1826, but little is known about her later life.

== Selected roles ==
- Miss Blandford in Speed the Plough by Thomas Morton (1798)
- Amelia Wildenhaim in Lovers' Vows by Elizabeth Inchbald (1798)
- Aurelia in Five Thousand a Year by Thomas John Dibdin (1799)
- Gangica in The Votary of Wealth by Joseph George Holman (1799)
- Ruth Starch in The Wise Man of the East by Elizabeth Inchbald (1799)
- Eloisa in Joanna of Montfaucon by Richard Cumberland (1800)
- Amelrosa in Alfonso, King of Castile by Matthew Lewis (1802)
- Honoria in Delays and Blunders by Frederick Reynolds (1802)
- Lady Caroline Braymore in John Bull by George Colman the Younger (1803)
- Laura in Hearts of Oak by John Allingham (1803)
- Julia Clareville in The Sailor's Daughter by Richard Cumberland (1804)
- Rosara in The Venetian Outlaw by Robert William Elliston (1805)
- Olivia in The Delinquent by Frederick Reynolds (1805)
- Matilda in Edgar by George Manners (1806)
- Zorilda in Timour the Tartar by Matthew Lewis (1811)
- Lady Julia Sandford in The Gazette Extraordinary by Joseph George Holman (1811)
- Almeyda in The Renegade by Frederick Reynolds (1812)

== Bibliography ==
- Highfill, Philip H, Burnim, Kalman A. & Langhans, Edward A. A Biographical Dictionary of Actors, Actresses, Musicians, Dancers, Managers and Other Stage Personnel in London, 1660-1800: Hough to Keyse. SIU Press, 1975.
