= Adelmorn, the Outlaw =

1801 play

- Original language: English
- Written by: Matthew Lewis
- Genre: Melodrama

Premiere
- Date: 4 May 1801
- Place: Theatre Royal, Drury Lane, London

Adelmorn, the Outlaw is an 1801 play by the British writer Matthew Lewis. The overture and incidental music was composed by Michael Kelly. It was first staged at the Theatre Royal, Drury Lane in London. The manager Richard Brinsley Sheridan chose the play ahead of the author's historical tragedy Alfonso, King of Castile, because he hoped it would enjoy the same success as his melodramatic hit The Castle Spectre.

The original cast included Charles Kemble as Adelmorn, William Barrymore as Father Cyprian, Richard Suett as Hugo, John Bannister as Lodowick, Marie Therese Du Camp as Herman, Dorothea Jordan as Innogen and Rosemond Mountain as Orilla.

== Bibliography ==
- Macdonald, David Lorne. Monk Lewis: A Critical Biography. University of Toronto Press, 2000.
- Nicoll, Allardyce. A History of Early Nineteenth Century Drama 1800-1850. Cambridge University Press, 1930.
