= Five Thousand a Year =

1799 play

- Irish edition
- Written by: Thomas John Dibdin
- Original language: English
- Genre: Comedy
- Setting: London, present day

Premiere
- Date premiered: 16 March 1799
- Place premiered: Covent Garden Theatre, London

Five Thousand a Year is a 1799 comedy play by the British writer Thomas John Dibdin.

The original Covent Garden cast included William Thomas Lewis as George Fervid, Alexander Pope as Frederick Fervid, Joseph Shepherd Munden as Sir Matthew Maxim, Charles Farley as Paragraph, Charles Murray as Mr Goulding, Julia Betterton as Maria, Jane Pope as Lady Julia, Nannette Johnston as Aurelia and Isabella Mattocks as Lady Maxim. It was dedicated to Count Starhemberg, the Austrian ambassador to London.

== Bibliography ==
- Nicoll, Allardyce. A History of English Drama 1660–1900: Volume III. Cambridge University Press, 2009.
- Hogan, C.B (ed.) The London Stage, 1660–1800: Volume V. Southern Illinois University Press, 1968.
