= Faulkener (play) =

1807 play

- Original language: English
- Written by: William Godwin
- Genre: Tragedy
- Setting: Florence, 17th century

Premiere
- Date: 16 December 1807
- Place: Theatre Royal, Drury Lane, London

Faulkener (also sometimes spelt as Faulkner) is an 1807 historical tragedy by the British writer William Godwin. The play premiered at the Theatre Royal, Drury Lane on 16 December 1807. The cast included Robert Elliston as Faulkener, Henry Siddons as Stanley, Harriet Siddons as Lauretta, Jack Palmer as Benedetto, William Powell as Orsini and Jane Powell as Arabella.

== Bibliography ==
- Greene, John C. Theatre in Dublin, 1745-1820: A Calendar of Performances, Volume 6. Lexington Books, 2011.
- O'Shaughnessy, David. The Plays of William Godwin. Routledge, 2016.
- Marshall, Peter. William Godwin: Philosopher, Novelist, Revolutionary. PM Press, 2017.
- Nicoll, Allardyce. A History of Early Nineteenth Century Drama 1800-1850. Cambridge University Press, 1930.
- Robertson, Ben P. The Diaries of Elizabeth Inchbald. Taylor & Francis, 2022.
