= Alfonso, King of Castile =

1802 play

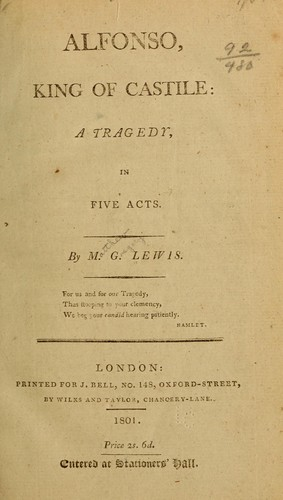
- Original language: English
- Written by: Matthew Lewis
- Genre: Historical
- Setting: Burgos, 1345

Premiere
- Date: 15 January 1802
- Place: Covent Garden Theatre, London

Alfonso, King of Castile is a historical tragedy by the English writer Matthew Lewis. It was published in November 1801, and was first staged at the Theatre Royal, Covent Garden the following year. It is set during the reign of Alfonso XI of Castile during the fourteenth century.

The original Covent Garden cast included Charles Murray as Alfonso, George Frederick Cooke as Orsino, Henry Johnston as Caesario, Charles Klanert as Marco, John Whitfield as Melchior, William Claremont as Gomez, George Davenport as Ricardo, John Waddy as Father Brazil, Nannette Johnston as Amelrosa and Harriett Litchfield as Otillia.
