= Folly as it Flies =

1801 play

- Original language: English
- Written by: Frederick Reynolds
- Genre: Comedy
- Setting: London, present day

Premiere
- Date: 29 October 1801
- Place: Theatre Royal, Covent Garden, London

Folly as it Flies is an 1801 comedy play by the British writer Frederick Reynolds. It premiered at the Theatre Royal, Covent Garden on 29 October 1801. The original Covent Garden cast included Charles Murray as Sir Herbert Melmoth, Henry Erskine Johnston as Leonard Melmoth, William Thomas Lewis as Tom Tick, Joseph Shepherd Munden as Peter Post Obit, Thomas Knight as Shenkin, Samuel Simmons as Doctor Infallible, John Waddy as Cursitor, John Whitfield as Malcour, Maria Gibbs as Georgiana and Harriet Murray as Lady Melmoth. The Irish premiere took place at the Crow Street Theatre on 14 January 1802.

== Bibliography ==
- Greene, John C. Theatre in Dublin, 1745-1820: A Calendar of Performances, Volume 6. Lexington Books, 2011.
- Nicoll, Allardyce. A History of English Drama 1660–1900: Volume IV. Cambridge University Press, 2009.
