= Life (play) =

1800 play

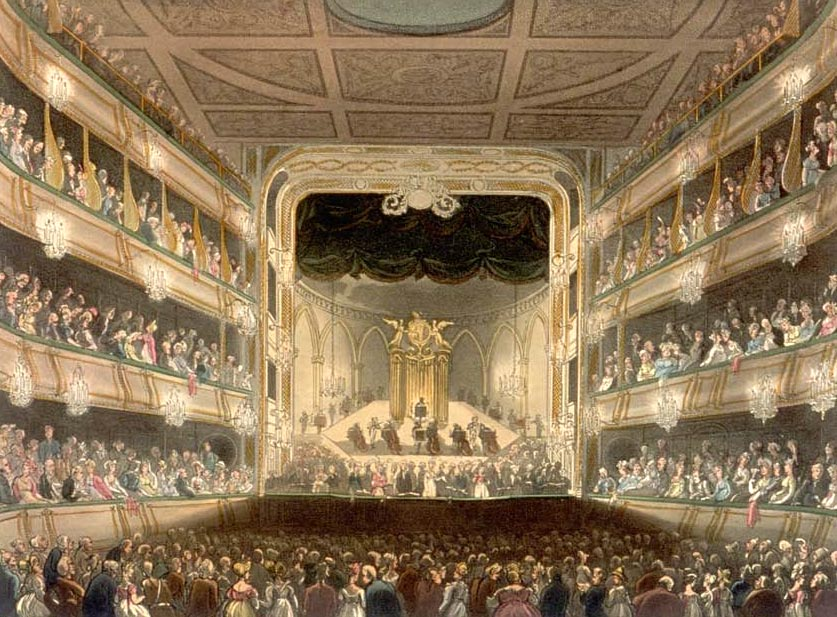
- Covent Garden
- Original language: English
- Written by: Frederick Reynolds
- Genre: Comedy
- Setting: England, present day

Premiere
- Date: 1 November 1800
- Place: Theatre Royal, Covent Garden, London

Life is an 1800 comedy play by the British writer Frederick Reynolds. It premiered at the Theatre Royal, Covent Garden in London on 1 November 1800. The Irish premiere took place at the Crow Street Theatre in Dublin on 20 January 1801. The original Covent Garden cast included William Thomas Lewis as Sir Harry Torpid, Joseph Shepherd Munden as Paul Primitive, John Fawcett as Lackbrain, John Emery as Crafty, Charles Farley as Jack Clifford, Charles Murray as Marchmont, Frances Chapman as Mrs Belford, Catherine St Ledger as Mrs Decoy and Harriet Siddons as Rosa Marchmont.

== Bibliography ==
- Greene, John C. Theatre in Dublin, 1745-1820: A Calendar of Performances, Volume 6. Lexington Books, 2011.
- Nicoll, Allardyce. A History of English Drama 1660–1900: Volume IV. Cambridge University Press, 2009.
