= William Bayle Bernard =

American-born London playwright and drama critic

William Bayle Bernard (27 November 1807 – 5 August 1875), often referred to as "Bayle Bernard", was a well-known American-born London playwright and drama critic. Born in Boston, Massachusetts, the son of English comic actor John Bernard, he came to Britain with his family in 1820, where he first worked as a clerk in an army accounts office. His plays include The Four Sisters and Casco Bay (1832), The Kentuckian (1833), The Nervous Man (1833), The Mummy (1833), Marie Ducange (1837), The Round of Wrong (1846), The Doge of Venice (1867), The Passing Cloud (1850) and A Storm in a Teacup (1854), as well as adaptations of Washington Irving's Rip Van Winkle (1834) and Wilkie Collins's No Name (1863). He also wrote the five-volume historical romance The Freebooter's Bride (1829).

His play The Mummy, a popular success on its debut at the Theatre Royal, Adelphi, influenced Edgar Allan Poe's "Some Words with a Mummy".
