= George Frederick Cooke =

English actor

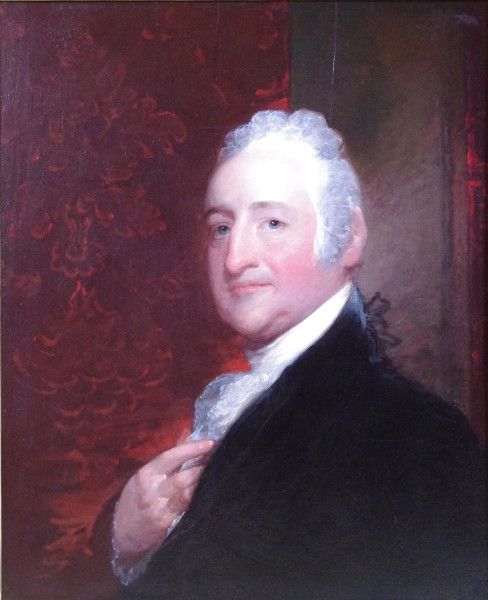
- Portrait by Gilbert Stuart, 1811
- Born: 17 April 1756; London, England
- Died: 26 September 1812 (aged 56); New York City, U.S.
- Occupation: actor

George Frederick Cooke (17 April 1756 – 26 September 1812) was an English actor. As famous for his erratic habits as for his acting, he was largely responsible for initiating the romantic style in acting that was later made famous by Edmund Kean.

== Career ==
Although he claimed to have been born in Westminster, it seems likely that he was the illegitimate child of a British soldier in Dublin. He was raised in Berwick-upon-Tweed, where in 1764 he was apprenticed to a printer. However, early exposure to strolling players made an impact. By the end of the decade he had gotten himself released from his apprenticeship and become an expert.

=== Early career ===
He made his first appearance on the stage in Brentford at the age of twenty as Dumont in Nicholas Rowe's Jane Shore. His first London appearance was at the Haymarket Theatre in 1778; he played in benefit performances of Thomas Otway's The Orphan, Charles Johnson's The Country Lasses, and David Garrick and George Colman's The Clandestine Marriage. Almost immediately, however, he returned to the country, and he spent the next decade and more touring, from Hull to Liverpool. He first performed with Sarah Siddons in York in 1786; by that time he had earned a substantial provincial reputation. In 1794 in Dublin, as Othello, he first attained high rank in a national capital; by 1800, London critics had dubbed him the Dublin Roscius. His unusually long provincial apprenticeship in many ways served him well. After an initial concentration on romantic leads, particularly in comedy, he gradually found his metier playing rakes and villains. As a regional star, he performed with Siddons, Dorothy Jordan and other London celebrities; he had over 300 roles in his repertoire.

=== Alcoholism ===
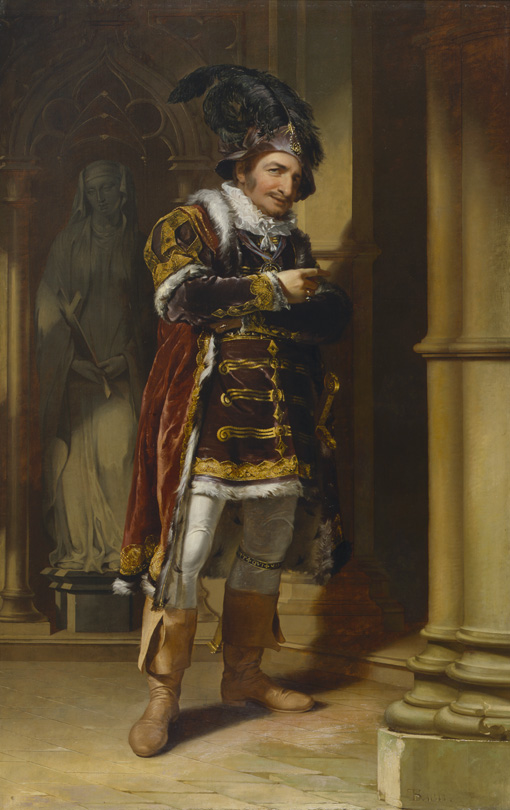
George Frederick Cooke as Richard III by Thomas Sully

At the same time, he developed a drinking problem, and a reputation for unreliability inevitably followed. A binge drinker, Cooke would abandon his duties for weeks at a time, often spending whatever money he had in the process. Shortly after his first triumph in Dublin, he disappeared from the stage for over a year. At some point in 1795, he had enlisted in the British Army, in a regiment due for deployment to the Caribbean. He was extricated from the military by the efforts of theatre owners in Manchester and Portsmouth, and he returned to Dublin in 1796.

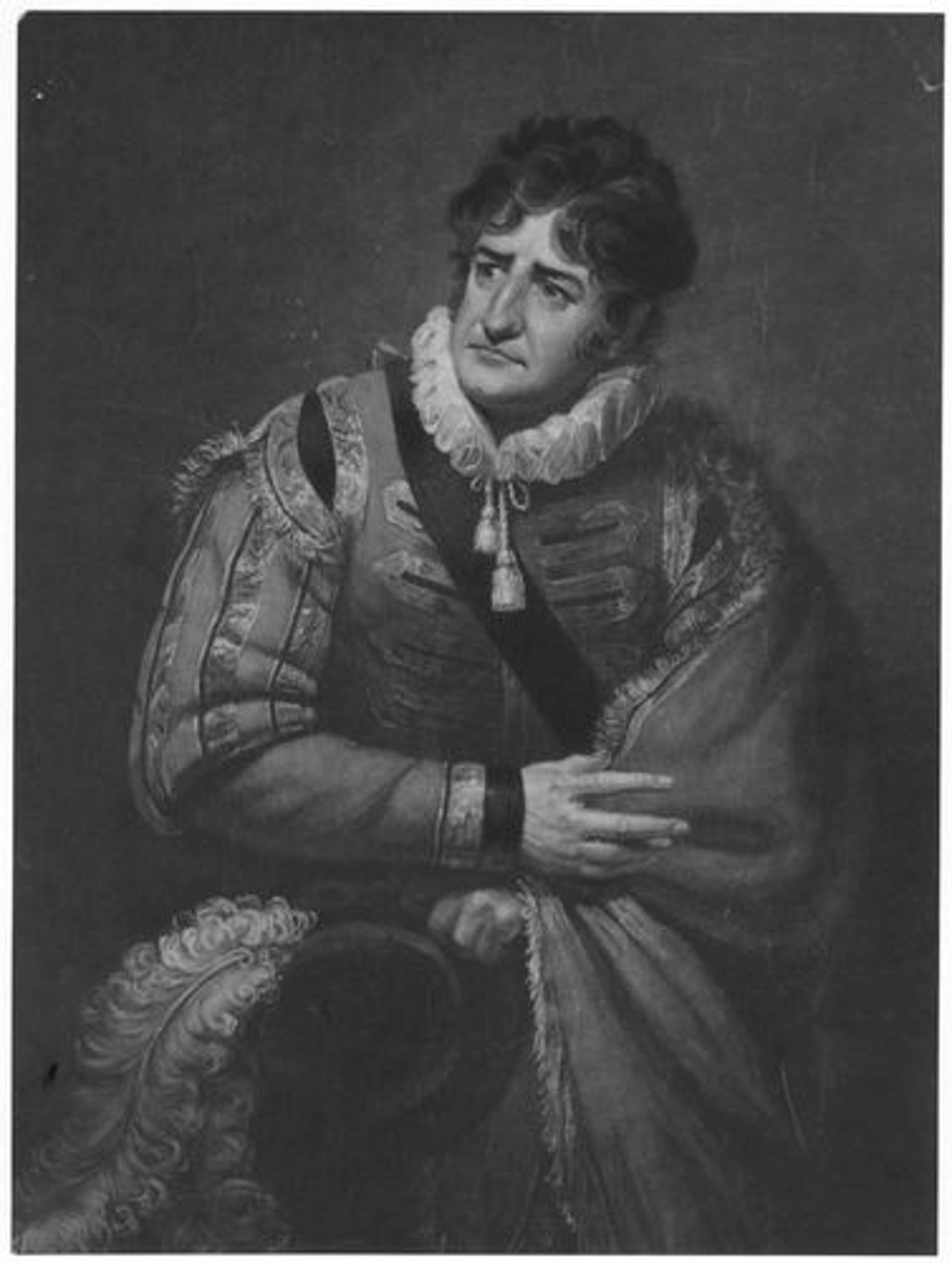
George Frederick Cooke as Iago

In 1801, he appeared at the Theatre Royal, Covent Garden as Richard III; this role would become his most famous. That year he also played Shylock (The Merchant of Venice), Iago (Othello), Macbeth, Kitely (Ben Jonson's Every Man in His Humour), and Giles Overreach, and became the rival of Kemble, with whom, however, and with Mrs. Siddons, he acted from 1803. In 1802 he added roles in Edward Moore's The Gamester and Charles Macklin's Man of the World and played Orsino in Alfonso, King of Castile by Matthew Lewis.

After Kemble and Siddons came to Covent Garden in 1803, the rivalry between the two actors unfolded on one stage instead of two. Fittingly, they debuted in Richard III, though Kemble played the title role and Cooke Richmond. Shortly later they acted in John Home's Douglas: Cooke played Glenalvon to Kemble's Old Norval, and Siddons was Lady Randolph. Washington Irving records seeing the group in Othello (Cooke was Iago, and Charles Kemble was Cassio); he called the performance delightful.

For the next decade, Cooke was an erratic star in London. Already a confirmed alcoholic when he arrived, he grew steadily less reliable as his career progressed. Already in 1801, he was unable to perform because he was drunk; such failures became more frequent in later years. In 1807, after failing to appear for his summer season in Manchester, he was jailed in Westmorland for several months. In the last years of the decade, he managed to curb his excesses to some extent; he was, for instance, frequently on stage during the Old Price riots.

=== American tour ===
However, he was unhappy with his treatment by the London press, and he was easily persuaded to travel to the United States in 1810. American audiences received him enthusiastically. He premiered as Richard III in New York on 11 November. Escorted by William Dunlap, he remained sober and performed in Boston, where he played opposite English tragedienne Mary Ann Duff, Baltimore, Philadelphia, and Providence. Thomas Sully painted him as Richard; the result is generally considered Sully's best painting of a human figure. He earned 20,000 dollars for his efforts, but the windfall reaped by the theater-owners (more than $250,000) left him feeling bitter and exploited. By 1812, he had accepted an invitation to return to Covent Garden. The outbreak of the War of 1812 stranded him in New York. He died of cirrhosis at the Mechanics' Hall in Manhattan on 26 September. He was buried in St. Paul's churchyard, New York.

A monument to his memory was erected in St. Paul's chapel (on Fulton Street) by Edmund Kean during his first American tour in 1821. Barry Cornwall claimed that Kean brought Cooke's big toe back to England, where his disgusted wife subsequently threw it away. Other biographers claim Kean stole a finger rather than a toe, and a relatively unreliable American writer claims that after Cooke's skull was used as the skull of Yorick in a performance of Hamlet, members of a private New York club (including Daniel Webster and Henry Wheaton) subjected the skull to phrenological examination.

== Private life ==
Cooke's personal life was markedly chaotic. Even apart from his binges, he was profligate and generous with his money, so that he rarely enjoyed a prolonged period of security. He married late. In September 1808 in Edinburgh he married Sarah Lamb. She accompanied him to London for the 1808 season, but in February 1809 Sarah returned to her family in Newark-on-Trent and was not associated with the actor thereafter. In New York, he married Violet Mary Behn, the daughter of a coffee-house owner. He left at his death $2000, all that remained of a lifetime as a famous actor.

== Acting ==
Cooke may be called the first fully romantic actor in England. He drew on the style of Garrick and Macklin, both of whom he saw in his youth; he expanded on their naturalness and informality of style. That Kean idolized him is perhaps sufficient to suggest his style; there are also the contrasts that period critics saw between his style and that of the refined, dignified Kemble.

Cooke was about 5'10", with a commanding stage presence and a long, aquiline nose. Percy Fitzgerald recalls his "tremendous force and rough declamation." His stage presence was generally described as commanding, although many observers noted that his voice tended to become hoarse in the later acts of challenging plays. He was, like Garrick, a restless, physically dynamic performer; critics also noted his skill in using his eyes to convey complex thoughts or emotions, and his ability to project stage-whispers even in a large venue.

Little record of response to his early romantic roles exists; however, his technique in his mature tragic roles is abundantly recorded. He was at his best in roles of suave or energetic villainy or hypocrisy. In comedy, his Macsarcasm (from Macklin's Love à la Mode) and Shylock were considered unsurpassable. In tragedy, in addition to Richard, he was a notable Iago. Though King Lear was not one of his signature roles, his interpretation of Lear's madness influenced that of Kean and other actors.

Yet his performance in roles that required refinement or restraint was almost universally disparaged—perhaps inevitably, given the looming shadow of Kemble. His Hamlet was a failure. As Macbeth, he was said to manage nothing better than "low cunning." Henry Crabb Robinson reports that Cooke failed in Kotzebue's The Stranger; Robinson expressed a common opinion when he concludes that however compelling a presence, Cooke was too coarse for the greatest tragic roles. Leigh Hunt agreed, arguing that Cooke reduced all of his characters to their lowest motives. Of Cooke's famous style of declamation (like Macklin, he delivered soliloquies as if thinking aloud), Hunt complained that it merely turned Shakespeare's poetry into indignant prose.

As Richard III, Cooke offered an interpretation that both differed from and excelled Kemble's rather staid performance. In such melodramatic scenes as the murder of Henry VI, Cooke excelled in conveying Richard's horrid glee (as, indeed, had Kemble); unlike Kemble, however, Cooke was also able to convey a sense of Richard's disgust with himself. This aspect of Richard was most notable in his discussion of his hunchback and in his response to Norfolk's doggerel in 5.2. Where Kemble had simply brushed the bad news aside, Cooke pondered the verse carefully before rejecting it without force. The effect was to deepen Richard's characterization, providing him with a gradually increasing awareness of his own villainy. Cooke's Richard was, then, something more than the fairy-tale ogre described by Charles Lamb.

On the whole, though, the limits of Cooke's talent are indicated by the probably apocryphal story related by Macready and others. Wishing to impress well-born visitors with his mimetic talent, Cooke made a number of faces meant to represent various emotions. One of his looks stumped the visitors. They guessed rage, anger, and revenge before Cooke, exasperated, told them it was meant to be love.

== Legacy ==
Scottish dramatist John Cargill Thompson wrote a one-person play The Actor's Apology about an incident when Cooke was forced by theatre management to make an apology to an audience for his drunken performance.
