= John Bernard (actor) =

English actor and biographer

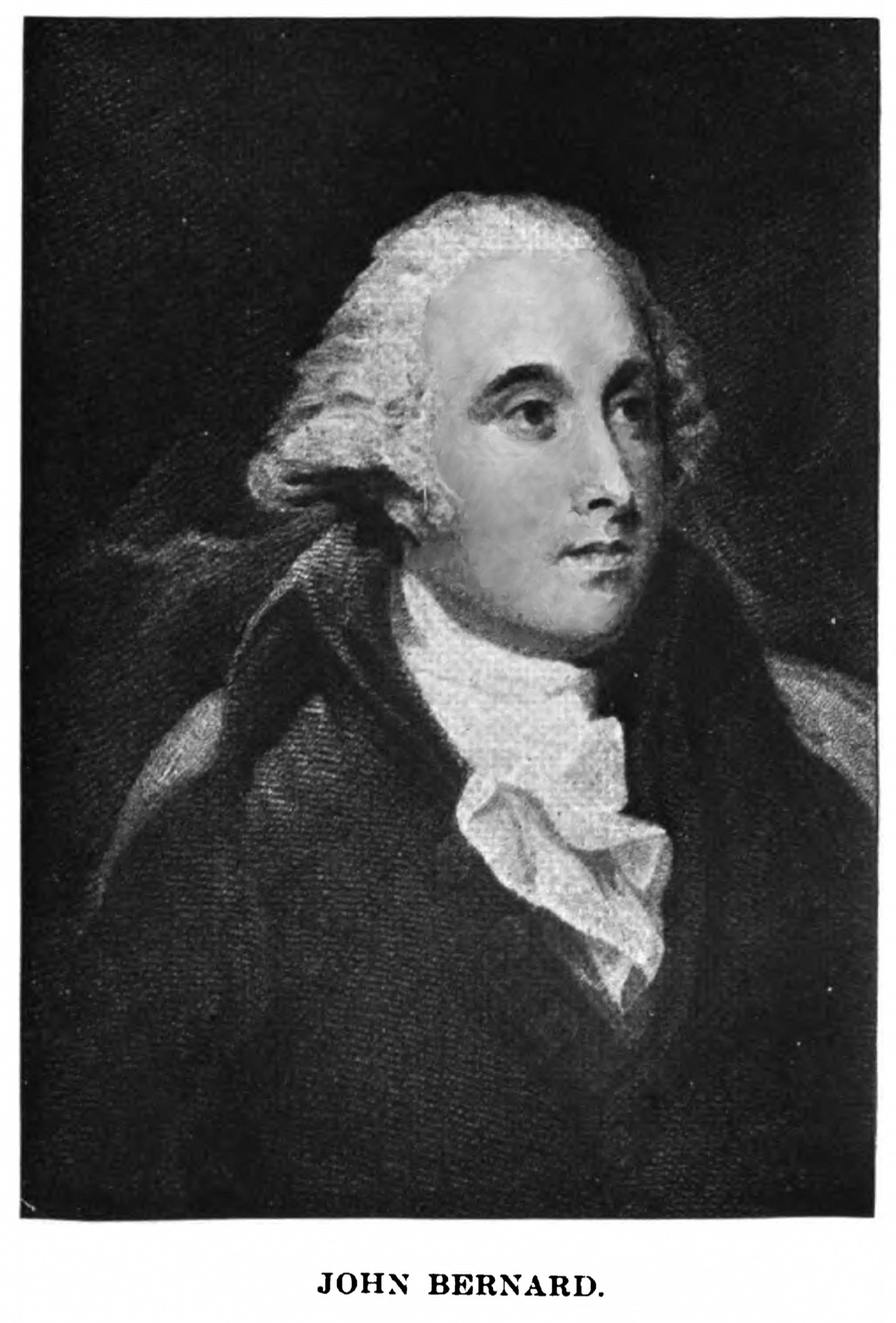
Engraving of John Bernard

John Bernard (1756 in Portsmouth, England – 29 November 1828 in London) was an English actor and biographer. He was the author of Retrospections of the Stage (1830) and Retrospections of America, 1797-1811. He acted in a number of plays with Mary Ann Duff. His son, William Bayle Bernard, was a playwright and critic, and edited editions of his Retrospections.
