= The Votary of Wealth =

1799 play

- Original language: English
- Written by: Joseph George Holman
- Genre: Comedy
- Setting: London, present day

Premiere
- Date: 12 January 1799
- Place: Covent Garden Theatre, London

The Votary of Wealth is a 1799 comedy play by the British writer Joseph George Holman.

The original Covent Garden cast included William Thomas Lewis as Drooply, Alexander Pope as Leonard Vizorly, Joseph Shepherd Munden as Oakworth, John Fawcett as Sharpset, Charles Murray as Clevland, John Emery as Old Vizorly, Julia Betterton as Caroline, Nannette Johnston as Gangica and Jane Pope as Julia Cleveland.

== Bibliography ==
- Nicoll, Allardyce. A History of English Drama 1660–1900: Volume III. Cambridge University Press, 2009.
- Hogan, C.B (ed.) The London Stage, 1660–1800: Volume V. Southern Illinois University Press, 1968.
