= Junius Brutus Booth =

English-born American actor (1796–1852)

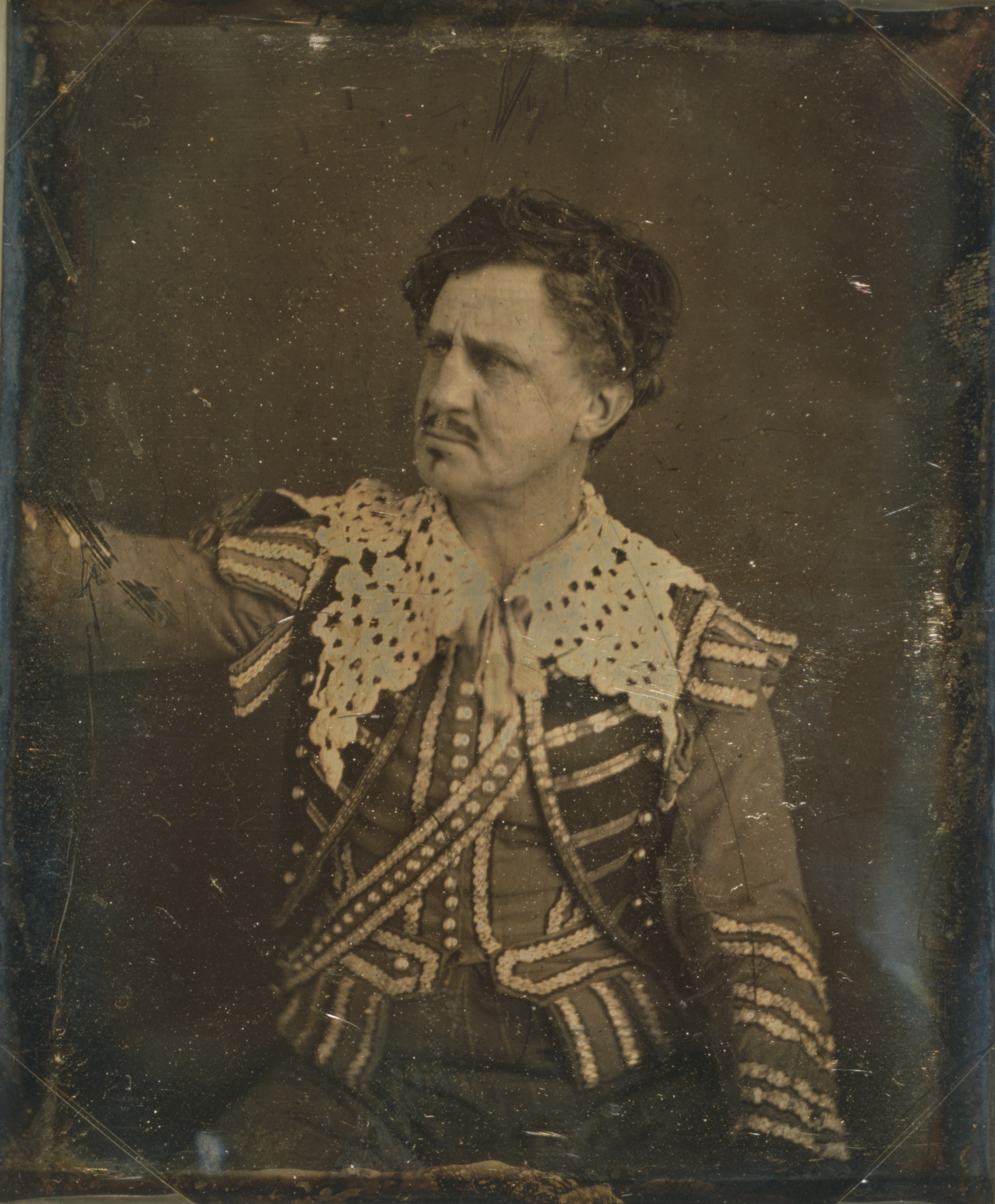
- Booth in c. 1850
- Born: Junius Brutus Booth; 1 May 1796; St. Pancras, London, England
- Died: 30 November 1852 (aged 56) vicinity of Louisville, Kentucky, U.S.
- Resting place: Green Mount Cemetery, Baltimore, Maryland, U.S.
- Occupation: Stage actor
- Years active: 1814–1852
- Spouses: Marie Christine Adelaide Delannoy (m. 1815; div. 1851) Mary Ann Holmes (m. 1851)
- Children: 12 including; Junius Jr., Edwin, Asia and John
- Relatives: Edwina Booth Grossman (granddaughter)

Signature
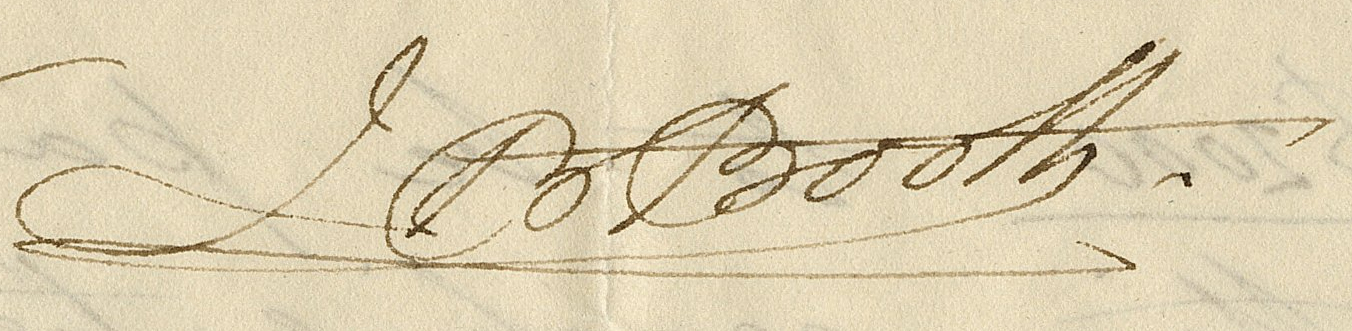

Junius Brutus Booth (1 May 1796 – 30 November 1852) was an English-born American actor. He was the father of actor John Wilkes Booth, who assassinated President Abraham Lincoln. His other children included Edwin Booth, one of the foremost tragedians of the mid-to-late 19th century, Junius Brutus Booth Jr., an actor and theatre manager, and Asia Booth Clarke, a poet and writer.

== Early life and education ==
Booth was born in St Pancras, London, the son of Richard Booth, a lawyer who was a strong supporter of the Patriot cause, and Jane Elizabeth Game. While he was growing up, Booth's father tried to settle his son in a lengthy succession of professions. Booth recalls of his childhood, "I was destined by my Controllers first for the Printing office, then to be an architect, then to be a sculptor and modeler, then a lawyer, then a sailor, of all of these I preferred those of sculptor and modeler."

On 26 September 1811, Sarah Blackbeard, a woman from Shoreditch, gave birth to a son, William. Called before a magistrate in March 1812, she stated that "one Junius Brutus Booth who resides at his Father's No. 1 Dove Row in the said Parish of St Leonard Shoreditch Gentleman... is the true and only Father of such Child." She repeated this as sworn evidence in 1813, when the child became chargeable on the parish under the English Poor Laws, giving Booth's address then as Queen Street, Bloomsbury.

In August 1814, Junius met Marie Christine Adelaide Delannoy while boarding at her mother's home in Brussels. She followed him to London where they eventually married on 17 May 1815, soon after his 19th birthday. Their first child, Amelia Portia Adelaide Booth, was born 4 months, 2 weeks and 4 days later, on 5 October 1815, but died 7 July 1816. Their only child to survive infancy was Richard Junius Booth (1819–1868).

== Career ==
Booth's interests in theatre came after he attended a production of Othello at the Covent Garden Theatre. The prospects of fame, fortune and freedom were very appealing to young Booth. He displayed a talent for acting from an early age, deciding on a career on stage by the age of 17. He performed roles in several small theatres throughout England, and joined a tour of the Low Countries in 1814, returning the following year to make his London debut.

Booth gained national renown in England with his performance in the title role of Richard III in 1817 at the Covent Garden Theatre. Critics compared his performances favorably with those of Edmund Kean, who was at the time the foremost tragedian in Britain. Partisans of the two actors, called Boothites and Keanites, would occasionally start rows at venues where the two were playing together. This did not stop the two from performing in the same plays; Kean and Booth acted in several Shakespearean productions at the Theatre Royal, Drury Lane from 1817 to 1821. Kean then saw Booth as a threat and orchestrated a way for the two of them to perform those roles yet again, planning to outperform his opponent. Kean's long-standing presence contributed to Booth's neverending comparisons to his rival.

=== Move to the United States ===
In 1821, Booth emigrated to the United States with Mary Ann Holmes, a flower girl, abandoning his wife and their young son. Booth and Holmes claimed to be married that year and settled in 1822 near Bel Air, Maryland. For years they lived in a log cabin Booth bought, moved to his 150 acres, and whitewashed. Just before his death, he began building a much grander house which he named Tudor Hall. It was listed on the National Register of Historic Places in 1973.

Booth was quickly hired to play Richard III. In less than a year, Booth became the most prominent actor in the United States. Critic William Winter said, "He was followed as a marvel. Mention of his name stirred an enthusiasm no other could awaken" (Smith 23). He embarked upon a 30-year acting career that made him famous throughout the country. Booth traveled to Baltimore, Boston, and New York.

A persistent story, but apocryphal according to some sources, is that Junius Brutus Booth was acclaimed for performing Orestes in the French language in New Orleans. Theatrical manager Noah Ludlow, who was performing with Booth at the time at the American theatre there, recounts the actual events starting on page 230 of his memoir Dramatic Life As I Found It and concludes: "Therefore, I consider the story of Mr. Booth having performed Orestes in the French language, on the French stage, altogether a mistake arising from his having acted that character in the Théâtre d'Orléans of New Orleans in 1822, but in the English language." However, author and professor of theater history Stephen M. Archer notes that Ludlow was in Mobile, Alabama, in 1828, so was not present for this performance. The Folger Shakespeare Library in Washington, DC, has two playbills from the production and both are in French. Booth's daughter Asia wrote that her father spoke fluent French and cited a review on the subject. The review was not oblivious to the fact that Booth's French pronunciation was less than perfect, however. In 1823, Booth did the role in New York in the English adaptation by Ambrose Philips with Mary Ann Duff as Hermione.

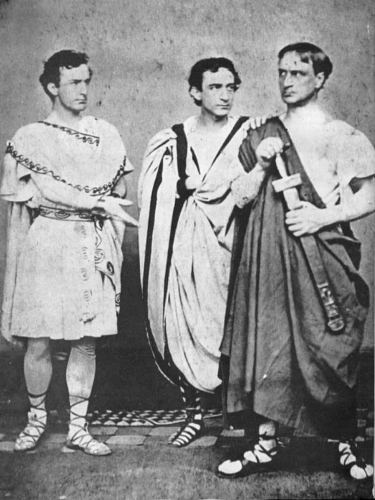
Left to right: Booth's sons, John, Edwin, and Junius Jr. in Julius Caesar

In 1825–1826 and 1836–1837, Booth made tours of his native England. He took his whole family with him for the second of these. During their stay in England, one of his children, Henry Byron, succumbed to smallpox. By 1831, he had become the manager of the Adelphi Theatre in Baltimore. His acclaim continued to grow throughout the rest of his life; Walt Whitman described him as "the grandest histrion of modern times." Although his relationship with Holmes, his supposed wife, was relatively happy, four of their children died, three in the same year (1833), when epidemics of cholera occurred. In addition, he suffered from alcoholism, which had an effect on the entire family.

Booth's alcoholism also caused him to become increasingly unpredictable and reckless. He would drop lines, miss scenes, and cause chaos onstage. During a performance of Hamlet, Booth suddenly left the scene he was playing with Ophelia, scurried up a ladder, and perched up in the backdrops crowing like a rooster until his manager retrieved him. He was once booked for a sold-out performance in Richmond, then disappeared from town for several days. Eventually, he was found with "ragged, besotted wretches, the greatest actor on the American stage."

Booth's alcoholism and violent nature often caused problems onstage during his performances. On several occasions, when he played the title character in Richard III, the actor playing the Earl of Richmond fled the stage when Booth became too aggressive during their dueling scene. One night, when Booth was appearing as Othello, the actress playing Desdemona had to be rescued by other cast members when Booth tried to genuinely suffocate her with a pillow.

Booth soon became so unreliable that he had to be locked into his hotel rooms with a guard standing watch. Often, he would still find ways of escaping to drink at a nearby tavern. Once, when a theatre manager locked Booth in his dressing room before a performance, Booth bribed a stage hand to go out and buy a bottle of whiskey. As the stage hand stood outside the door, Booth stuck a drinking straw through the keyhole and sipped whiskey from the bottle.

Booth's violent behavior offstage was notable as well. In Charleston, in 1838, Booth was so intoxicated that he attacked a friend, Tom Flynn, with a fireplace andiron. To defend himself, Flynn hit Booth in the face, breaking his nose and forever altering the actor's profile and voice.

Some historians and critics have claimed that reality could become overwhelming for Booth, so he would flee into alcoholism and the roles he played. One critic said of Booth that the "personality of the actor was forgotten, and all the details seemed spontaneous workings and unconscious illustrations of the character he represented. He seemed to be possessed by the characters, losing his own identity." Such subjective judgments are perhaps too facile, as Edwin Booth's later comment about his father certainly was: "Great minds to madness closely are allied." In any case, from February 1817 onward, Junius Booth played almost 3,000 performances. Booth brought a romantic, natural acting style to America, which he pioneered in the hearts of American audiences.

To help him maintain a modicum of stability and also to ensure that he sent his earnings home to the family, Junius and Mary Ann chose their son Edwin to accompany him as his dresser, aid, and guardian. This was an exhausting job because Junius Brutus could go without sleep for very long periods of time and would often disappear.

In 1835, Booth wrote a letter to President Andrew Jackson, demanding he pardon two pirates. In the letter, he threatened to kill the President. Though there would also be an actual attempt of assassination on the President early that year, the letter was believed to be a hoax, until a handwriting analysis of a letter written some days after the threat concluded that the letter was, in fact, written by Booth. Booth apologized to Jackson, though since he and Jackson were friends, the "threat" likely was Booth's clumsy attempt at a joke. Decades later, Booth's son, John Wilkes, assassinated President Abraham Lincoln.

== Later life ==
In 1852, Booth was involved in a tour of California with his sons Edwin and Junius Jr., performing in San Francisco and Sacramento, where torrential rains not only closed the theatres, but also seriously depleted food supplies. Inflation skyrocketed, and the Booths returned to San Francisco without having made a penny. On 1 October, he left San Francisco without either of his sons. (Junius Jr. had previously established his home there, and Edwin struck out on his own, acting in various venues in northern California.)

Booth had told his first wife, at the time of his initial departure from England, that he would be touring the United States for several years, but would send her money to support her and his young son, Richard, but Booth's sister and brother-in-law later arrived with their children from England and demanded to be housed and supported in exchange for keeping quiet about his American family. After some years, this arrangement became financially untenable, and Booth stopped sending his wife money so regularly. This prompted Adelaide to send their son, now 25, to Baltimore. For three years, Booth somehow fooled him into believing that he lived alone, but eventually Richard discovered the truth. He sent word to his mother, who arrived in Baltimore in December 1846 and confronted Booth when he returned home from touring in March. After living the requisite three years in Maryland, she was able to divorce him in February 1851.

On 10 May 1851, with the youngest of their 10 children now 11 years of age, Booth finally legally married Mary Ann Holmes.

== Death ==
While traveling by steamboat from New Orleans to Cincinnati in 1852, Booth developed a severe fever, presumably from drinking impure river water. No physician was on board, and he died aboard the steamboat near Louisville, Kentucky, on 30 November 1852. Booth's widow, Mary Ann, traveled to Cincinnati alone to claim his body.

Booth is buried in Green Mount Cemetery in Baltimore.

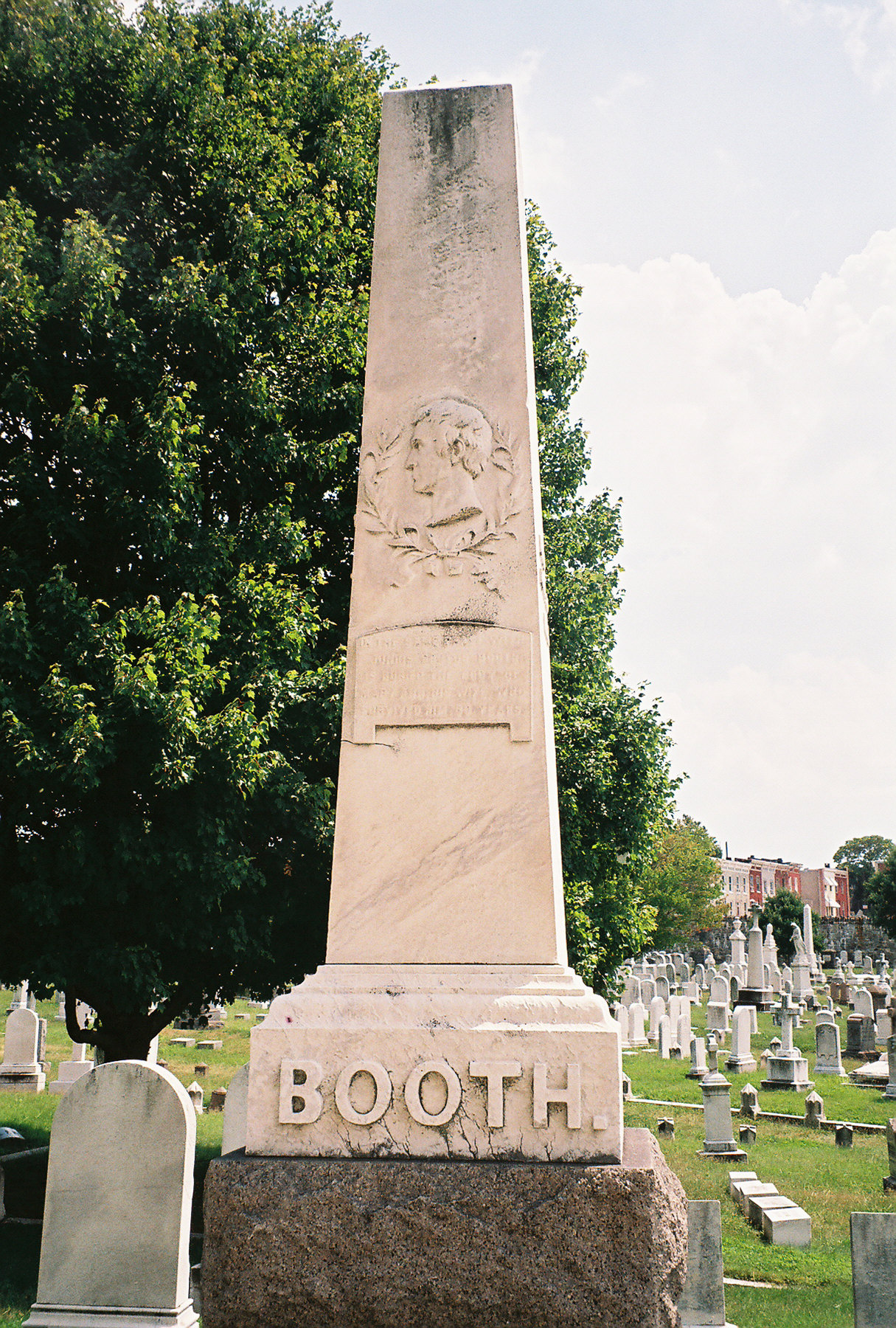
Booth's grave at Green Mount Cemetery in Baltimore

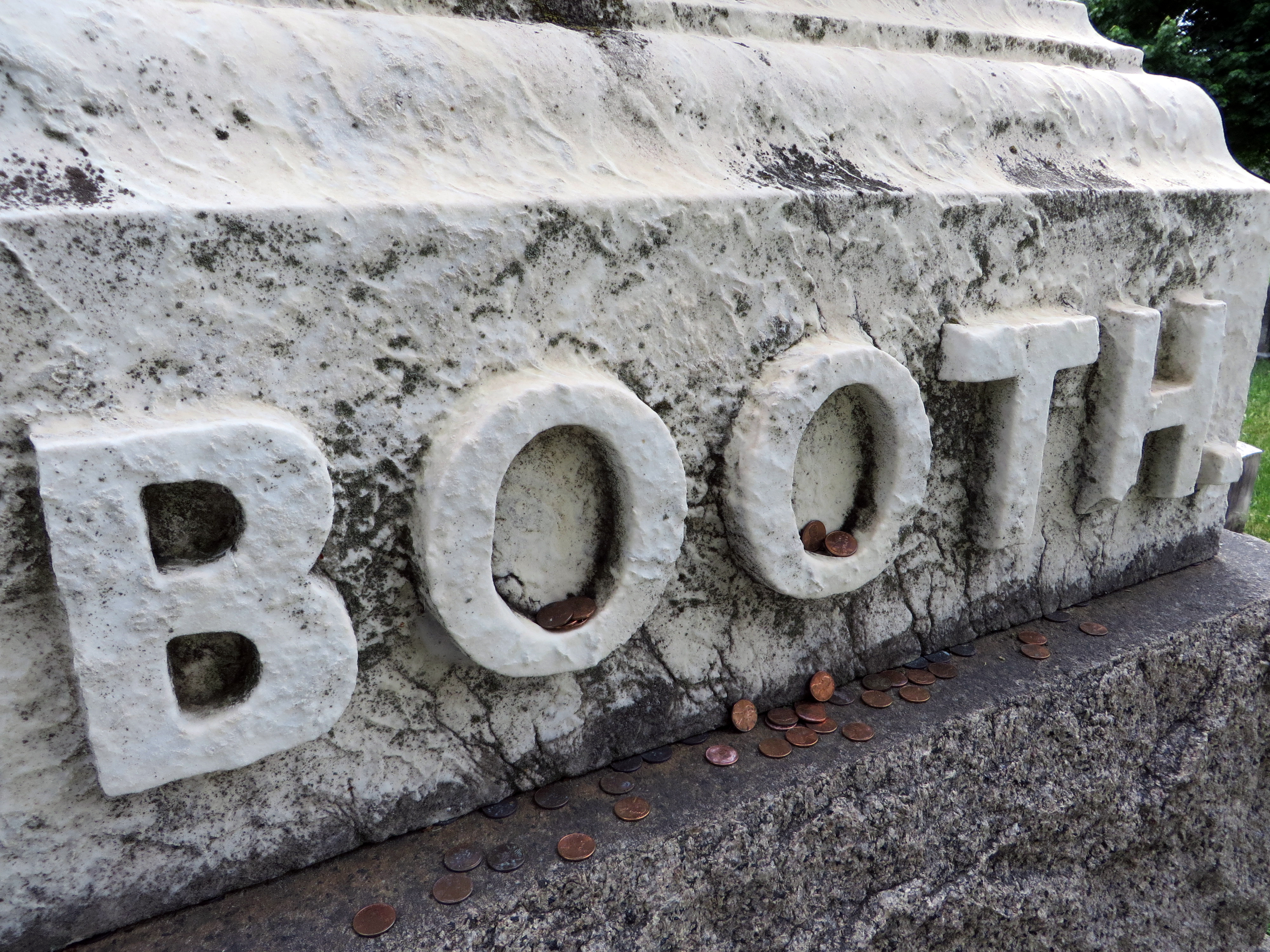
Visitors to the Booth family plot often leave pennies, which depict Lincoln on the obverse, on the monument of John Wilkes Booth's father, Junius.

== Legacy ==
Junius Brutus Booth was posthumously inducted into the American Theatre Hall of Fame in 1981.

== Portrayals in popular culture ==
Robert Warwick portrayed Junius Brutus Booth in The Farmer Takes a Wife (1935).

Raymond Massey portrayed Junius Brutus Booth in Prince of Players (1955).

Frank Langella portrayed Junius Brutus Booth in the play Booth (1994) by Austin Pendleton.

Thom Sesma portrayed Junius Brutus Booth in the original musical Tyrants (2023), which was performed at the National Archives Museum in Washington, D.C.

== See also ==
- Booth family
