= Charles Farley =

English actor and dramatist

Charles Farley (1771–1859) was an English actor and dramatist.

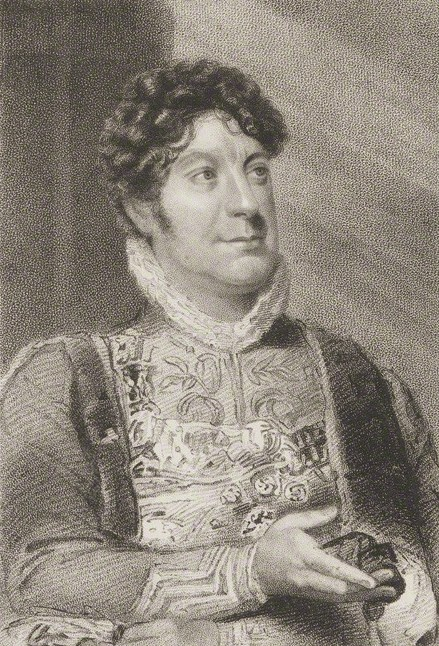
Charles Farley as Cloten in Cymbeline, 1821 engraving by Thomas Woolnoth after Thomas Charles Wageman

== Career ==
Farley was born in London and entered the theatrical profession at an early age, making his first appearance as a page at Covent Garden Theatre, London, in 1782. He came to notice in legitimate drama as Osric in Hamlet, Trip in The School for Scandal, and similar parts. He was better known, however, as a melodramatic performer and as an efficient stage-manager. He was the instructor of Joseph Grimaldi, with whom he starred in a production of Valentine and Orson in 1806, Farley playing the former role. He also assisted Thomas Dibdin in the composition of Harlequin and Mother Goose, the show which boosted Grimaldi to stardom. From 1806 to 1834 the Covent Garden pantomimes owed much of their success to Farley's inventive mind and diligent superintendence. As a theatrical machinist he was in his time without a rival, and he was the originator of many of the incidents and tricks introduced into the dramas and pantomimes at this house. His acting was in the old-fashioned noisy manner, with much gesture, a popular style with the contemporary audience.

He retired from public life in 1834, and died at his residence, 42 Ampthill Square, Hampstead Road, London, on 28 January 1859.

== Appearances ==
Notable roles include Sanguinback in Cherry and Fair Star, Grindoff in The Miller and his Men (a piece for which Sir H. R. Bishop wrote charming music), Robinson Crusoe, and his Timour the Tartar. He also played comedic characters, such as Jeremy in Love for Love and Lord Trinket in The Jealous Wife.

== Written Pieces ==
Farley wrote many plays himself, most of which were not printed. Some notable works include:

- Raymond and Agnes, or the Castle of Lindenburgh (air, glees and choruses), 1797.
- The Magic Oak, a Christmas Pantomime, 1799.
- Red Roy, or Oswyn and Helen, 1803.
- Aggression, or the Heroine of Yucatan, 1805.
- Harlequin and Mother Shipton. Arranged and produced by Mr. Farley 1826.
- Henry IV, Part II. Arranged by Mr. Farley, with four additional scenes representing the Coronation in the Abbey 1821.

== Selected roles ==
- Boy in The Disbanded Officer by James Johnstone (1786)
- Jack Clifford in Life by Frederick Reynolds (1800)
- Chevy Shase in The School for Prejudice by Thomas Dibdin (1801)
- Witling in The Three Per Cents by Frederick Reynolds (1803)
- Reference in The Will for the Deed by Thomas Dibdin (1804)
- Willowear in To Marry or Not to Marry by Elizabeth Inchbald (1805)
- Bertrand in The Foundling of the Forest by William Dimond (1809)
- Antony Foster in Kenilworth by Alfred Bunn (1821)
