= Harriet Siddons =

Scottish actress and theatre manager

Harriet Siddons (née Murray; 16 April 1783 – 2 November 1844), sometimes known as Mrs Henry Siddons, was a Scottish actress and theatre manager.

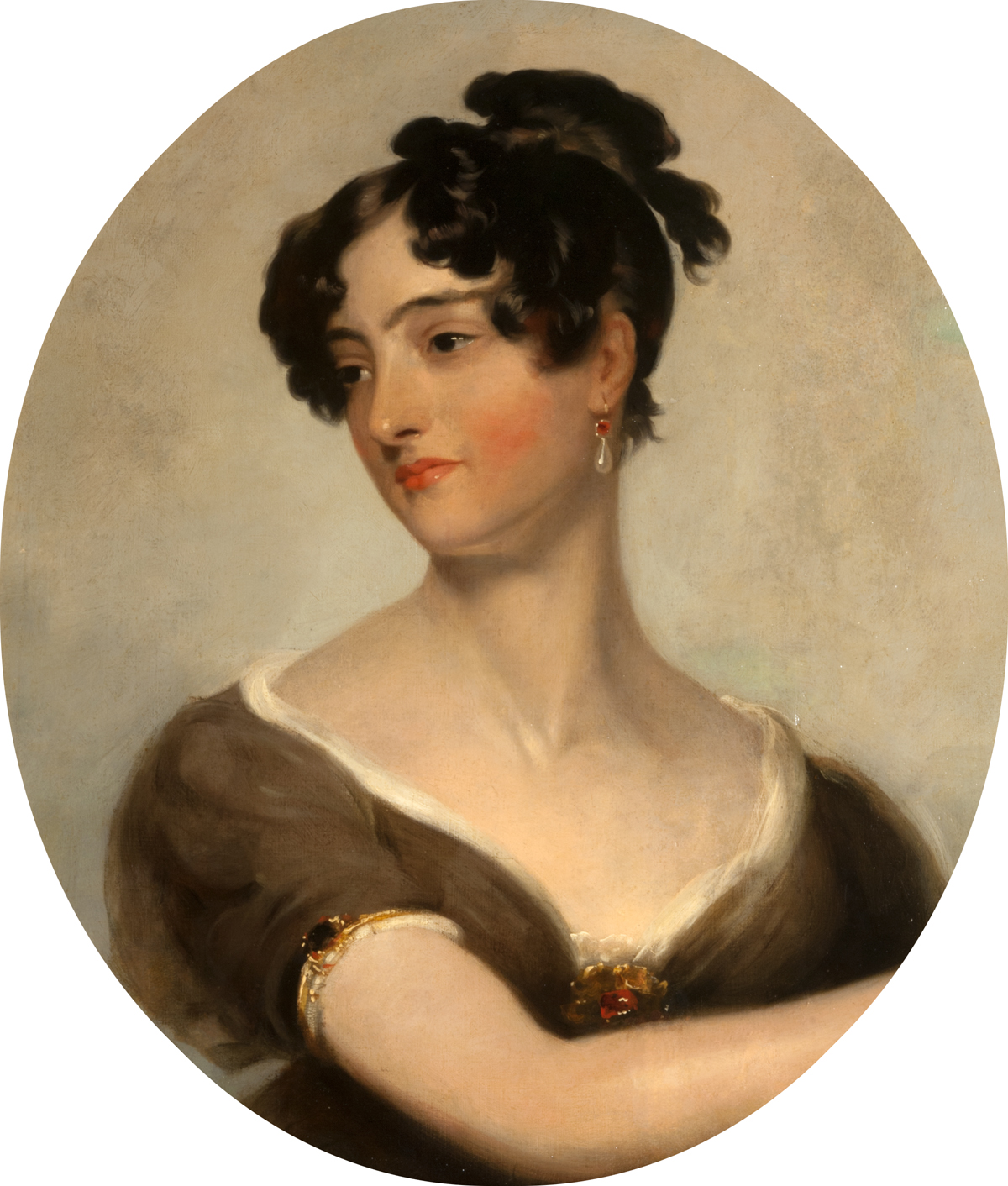
Harriet Siddons, portrait by John Wood

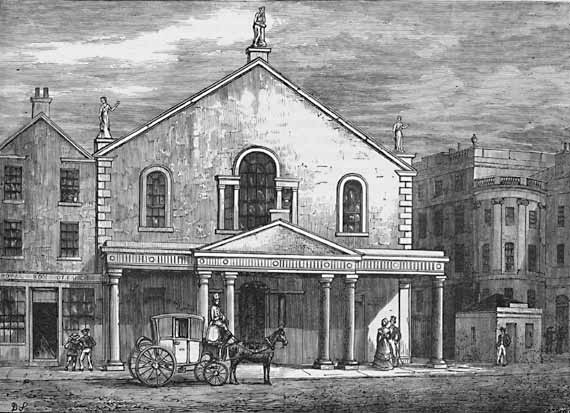
Theatre Royal, Edinburgh

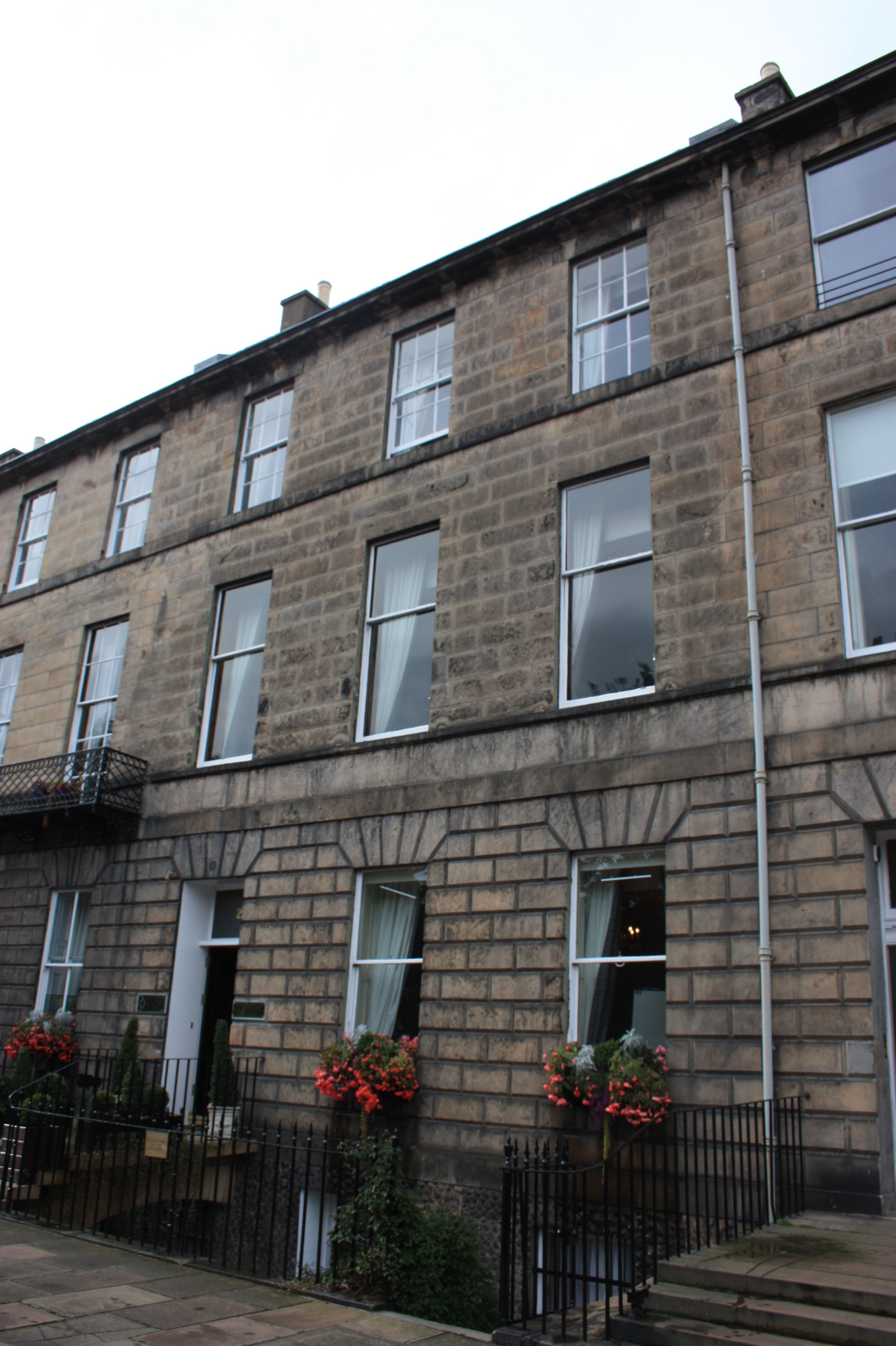
29 Abercromby Place, Edinburgh

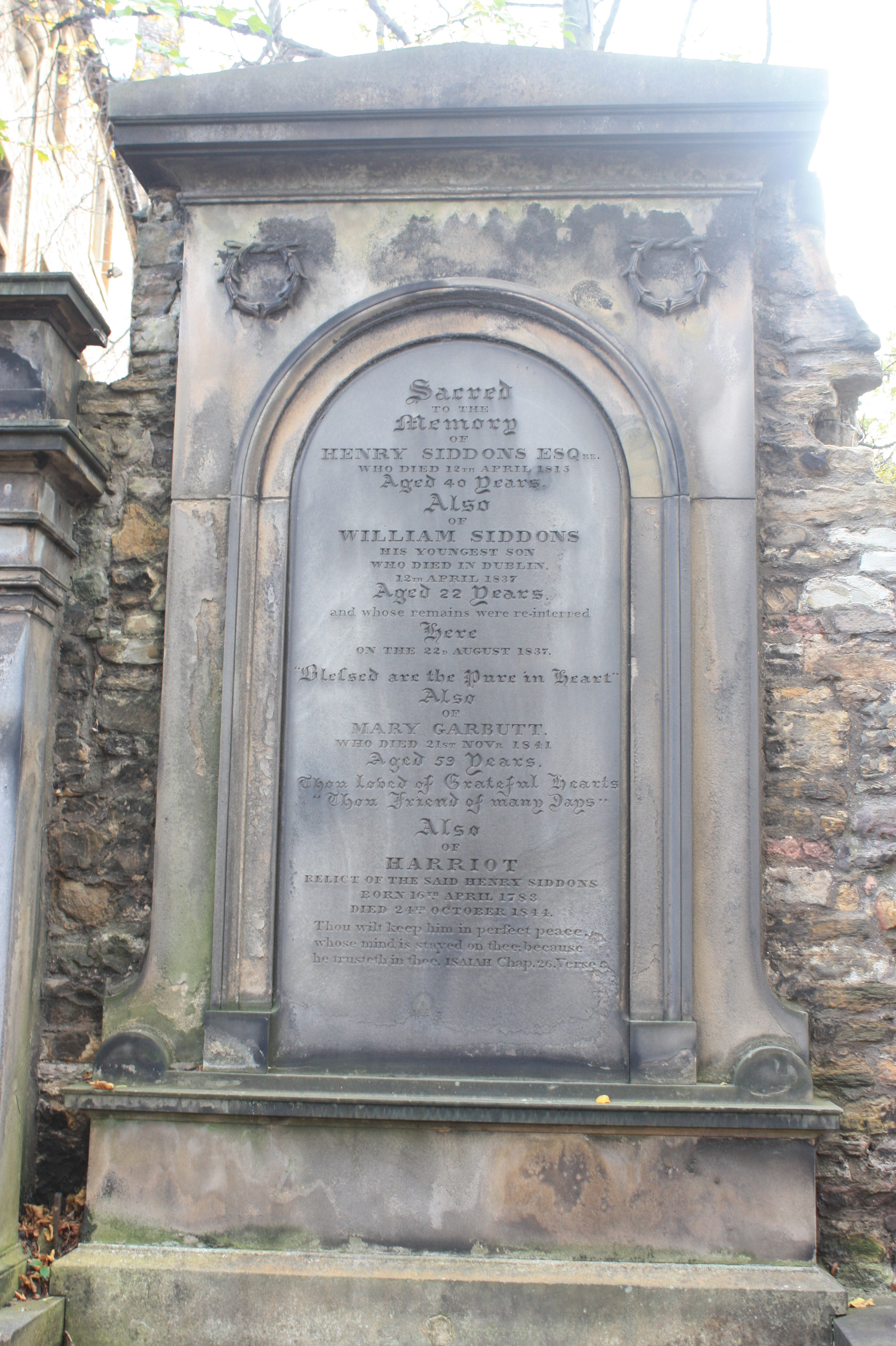
The grave of Henry and Harriet Siddons, Greyfriars Kirkyard

Edinburgh referred to her as "Our" Mrs Siddons to distinguish her from her English mother-in-law, Sarah Siddons.

== Life ==
She was born Harriet Murray, the daughter of actor Charles Murray and his second wife Ann Murray born at Norwich, Norfolk on 16 April 1783.

As a young child she appeared at Bath as Prince Arthur on 1 July 1793. Her first London appearance was at Covent Garden Theatre as Perdita in The Winter's Tale, 12 May 1798. It was at Covent Garden in 1801 that she and Henry Siddons first appeared on stage together. They married the following year. The two remained at the theatre until the summer of 1805, when they joined the Drury Lane Theatre Company together. She left it with him in 1809. At Covent Garden she played a range of parts, such as Rosalind, Viola, Lady Townly, Lucy Ashton, Desdemona, Beatrice, Portia, Lady Teazle, and Miss Hardcastle. At Drury Lane on 24 September 1805 she was Juliet to Robert William Elliston's Romeo.

After moving to Edinburgh in 1809 with Henry, to take over the Theatre Royal at the east end of Princes Street she helped her husband in his managerial work, and also appeared alongside him on stage. Her first Edinburgh role was on 9 November 1809 in the play "The Honey Moon" in which she played Juliana.

Together they first lived at 3 Maitland Street then at 3 Forth Street.

In 1814 the Drury Lane management made her a tempting offer to play leading female parts to Edmund Kean, but she declined. When Henry Siddons died in 1815 the affairs of the Edinburgh Theatre were in a bad state, but, with her brother William Henry Murray, she continued to steer clear of all difficulties, and eventually was able to retire at the end of her 21 years' lease of the theatre. The turning point in the fortunes of the house had been the production on 15 February 1819 of Isaac Pocock's Rob Roy, in which Charles Mackay made a hit in the role of Bailie Nicol Jarvie. When the same piece was played by royal command before George IV, on the occasion of his visit to Scotland, Siddons played, for that night only, the part of Diana Vernon.

Due to English-Scottish tensions and post-Jacobite feelings, the promotion of Scots-based stories had to be placed in the past and labelled as fictions to disguise their anti-English stance and Sir Walter Scott wrote many pieces especially for the theatre. Scott was a close friend to Harriet.

In 1827 Mrs Siddons moved to 23 Windsor Street, a handsome Georgian townhouse designed by William Henry Playfair. The house lies around ten minutes walk from the site of the Theatre.

In 1830 Mrs Siddons paid the final of 21 annual rental payments of £2000 to the trustees of the owner of the Theatre Royal, Mr John Jackson, and thereafter became outright owner of the theatre.

Siddons' farewell benefit took place on 29 March 1830, and Sir Walter Scott wrote for the occasion an address which she delivered. Her final role on this night was as Lady Townley in the play "The Provoked Husband". Mrs Siddons continued to live in Edinburgh for the rest of her life and became a popular figure in Edinburgh society. The city was very proud of her and referred to her as "Our Mrs Siddons".

She moved to 29 Abercromby Place in her final years - a more central location for society affairs.

She died at home on Abercromby Place on 2 November 1844 aged 61. She is buried with her husband in Greyfriars Kirkyard in Edinburgh. The grave lies in the south-west corner next to the entrance to the "Covenanters Prison".

== Epilogue ==
Her brother, William Henry Murray took out a 21 year lease on the theatre from Harriet in 1830 and ran the Theatre Royal as manager from 1830 to 1851. The use was relocated to Broughton Street soon after his retiral, built in a high Victorian style. The original theatre was demolished in 1895 to make way for the General Post Office Scottish headquarters building.

All that remains of the original is a cast-iron hitching post on the pavement edge where riders would hitch their horses outside the Theatre.

== Selected roles ==
- Rosa Marchmont in Life by Frederick Reynolds (1800)
- Marian in The School for Prejudice by Thomas Dibdin (1801)
- Lady Memlmoth in Folly as it Flies by Frederick Reynolds (1801)
- Lauretta in Delays and Blunders by Frederick Reynolds (1802)
- Rosalie in The Three Per Cents by Frederick Reynolds (1803)
- Emily in A Prior Claim by Henry James Pye (1805)
- Miss Emily in The School for Friends by Marianne Chambers (1805)
- Emily in The Vindictive Man by Thomas Holcroft (1806)
- Lauretta in Faulkener by William Godwin (1807)
- Adriana in The Siege of St Quintin by Theodore Hook (1808)
- Ellen in Grieving's a Folly by Richard Leigh (1809)

== In fiction ==
Harriet Siddons features as a minor character in Helen Graham's novel The Real MacKay: Walter Scott's favourite comedian (2024).

== Notes ==
Bibliography

- Highfill, Philip H.; Burnim, Kalman A.; Langhans, Edward A. (1991). A Biographical Dictionary of Actors, Actresses, Musicians, Dancers, Managers & Other Stage Personnel in London, 1660-1800. SIU Press. ISBN 978-0-8093-1525-3.

Attribution

This article incorporates text from a publication now in the public domain: Lee, Sidney, ed. (1897). "Siddons, Henry". Dictionary of National Biography. Vol. 52. London: Smith, Elder & Co.
