= William Henry Murray =

Scottish actor, manager and theatre owner

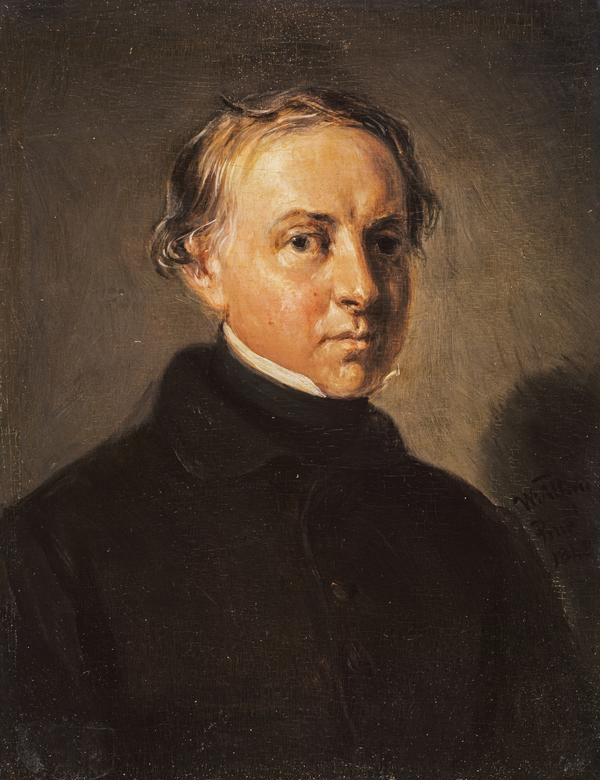
William Henry Murray

William Henry Wood Murray (1790–1852), a Scottish actor, manager and theatre owner in Edinburgh, was a friend of Walter Scott and particularly associated with dramatisations of Scott's Waverley Novels.

== Life ==
Born in Bath on 26 August 1790, he moved to Edinburgh in 1809 and worked there for over forty years as an actor, manager and dramatist. Around that time (1809), he married Anne Dyke, the sister of tragedienne Mary Ann Duff, but she died soon after the marriage. He married his second wife, Miss Ellen Gray at Southwark in July 1830.

He was the son of the actor and dramatist Charles Murray, and grandson of the Jacobite Sir John Murray of Broughton who, when captured after the Battle of Culloden, saved his life by betraying his fellow Jacobites then lived out his life in Edinburgh as a haunted and hated figure. Walter Scott's father as a lawyer had professional dealings with the old man, but on one occasion after his wife brought tea, he afterwards threw the cup out the window saying, "Neither lip of me nor of mine comes after Murray of Broughton's." This incident may have later contributed to Scott's antiquarian interest in the family and friendship with William Henry Murray. 10 June 1818 saw the first performance of Murray's operatic adaption of Walter Scott's novel Rob Roy. It was titled "Rob Roy MacGregor".

When Scott was preparing for the visit of King George IV to Scotland in 1822 he was quick to draw on Murray's expertise for the management of events. Murray created the settings at various venues, contrived the "revived ancient dresses" and arranged the "traditional" pageants. He was particularly acclaimed for his success in transforming the Assembly Rooms in George Street into a theatrical palace for the Peers' Grand Ball, an event that was pivotal in making the tartan kilt which had been thought of as the primitive dress of mountain thieves into the national dress of the whole of Scotland. The King's last and least formal public appearance during the visit to Edinburgh was at a theatre performance of Scott's Rob Roy adapted and produced by Murray.

In 1830 he began leasing the Theatre Royal, Edinburgh from his sister Harriet Siddons and at the end of his 21 year lease he retired to St Andrews in 1851.

He died in St Andrews on 5 May 1852 and is buried against the eastern wall of St Andrew's Cathedral churchyard, backing onto the Eastern Cemetery.

== In fiction ==
Murray features as a character in Helen Graham's novel The Real Mackay: Walter Scott's favourite comedian (2024).
