= Samuel Simmons (actor) =

English actor

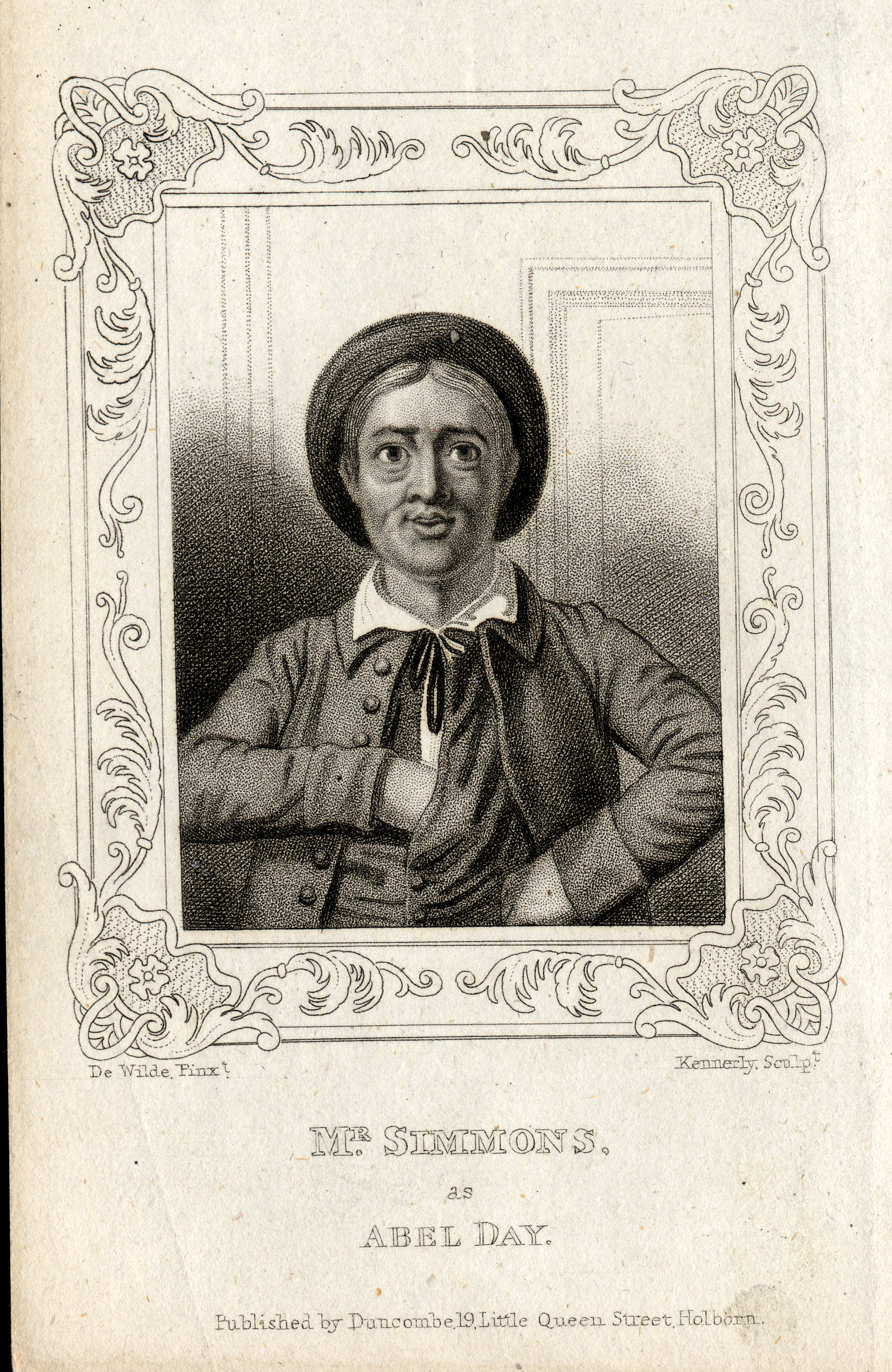
- Simmons as Abel in "The Honest Thieves"
- Born: 1777? London
- Died: 1819
- Occupation: Actor

Samuel Simmons (1777? – 1819) was an English actor.

== Biography ==
Simmons was born in London about 1777. He is first heard of at Covent Garden on 21 September 1785, when, as ‘Master’ Simmons, he played the Duke of York in Colley Cibber's ‘Richard III,’ and showed promise. On 21 November following he was Tom Thumb. He is said to have also played the boy in Henry Carey's ‘Contrivances,’ the page in the ‘Orphan’ and other juvenile characters. He soon disappears from ken to return as a man to the same house on 5 November 1796 as the original Momus, a part rejected by Fawcett, in John O'Keeffe's ‘Olympus in an Uproar.’ On the 19th he was the first Dicky, a keeper in the king's bench, in Joseph George Holman's ‘Abroad and at Home.’ The Puritan in ‘Duke and No Duke,’ Endless in ‘No Song no Supper’ followed, and he was on 25 April 1797 the original Premiss, a lawyer, in Hoare's ‘Italian Villagers.’ From this time until his death he remained at Covent Garden, playing Verges and Oliver in ‘Wives as they were;’ Daniel in ‘Conscious Lovers;’ Busy, an original part in a piece entitled ‘Raft on both Sides of the Water;’ Master Matthew in ‘Every Man in his Humour;’ Joey, an original part in ‘British Fortitude’ by Cross; and many parts (chiefly small) in farces now wholly forgotten. On 27 December 1799 he was entrusted with Munden's rôle of Verdun in ‘Lovers' Vows,’ and, 3 February 1800, with Fawcett's part of Cloddy in the ‘Mysteries of the Castle.’ On 5 December he, Blanchard, and Emery were the Three Witches on Cooke's first appearance as Macbeth. Peter in the ‘Sharper’ and Justice Greedy in ‘A New Way to pay Old Debts’ followed. On 12 May 1801 he was the first Jerry in William Dimond's ‘Seaside Story,’ 29 October the first Dr. Infallible in Frederick Reynolds's ‘Folly as it flies,’ and 9 February 1802 the first Manikin in Thomas Dibdin's ‘Cabinet.’ After playing Linco in ‘Cymon’ he was, 30 October, the original Privilege in Reynolds's ‘Delays and Blunders,’ and, 18 December, the original Squire Supplejack in Dibdin's ‘Family Quarrels.’ He was then seen as Pistol in ‘King Henry V,’ and was, 5 November 1803, the first Fainwou'd in Kenney's ‘Raising the Wind.’ Old Woman in ‘Rule a Wife and have a Wife,’ Totterton in ‘Love laughs at Locksmiths,’ Feeble in the ‘Second Part of King Henry IV,’ Capias, an original part in Dibdin's ‘Will for the Deed,’ and Robert Shallow in the ‘Merry Wives of Windsor’ followed; and, 18 April 1805, he was the first Jonathan Oldskirt in George Colman's ‘Who wants a Guinea?’ On 28 January 1806 he was the first Stubby in Colman's ‘We fly by Night.’ Lord Sands in ‘King Henry VIII’ was then entrusted him, as was Fulmer in the ‘West Indian,’ and Dr. Pinch in ‘Comedy of Errors;’ and he was, 25 February 1808, the original Matthew Mole in John Till Allingham's ‘Who wins?’ On 8 February 1810 he was the first Oliver in Reynolds's ‘Free Knights.’ On 2 May, when a performance was given for the benefit of the Theatrical Fund, his name appears as member of the committee. Moses in the ‘School for Scandal’ and Probe in the ‘Trip to Scarborough’ were played, and he was on 2 July 1812 the first Old Heartwell in ‘Trick for Trick,’ and on the 6th the first Clinch in Robert Francis Jameson's ‘Touch at the Times.’ In Poole's travesty of ‘Hamlet,’ 17 June 1813, he was the first Laertes. Peter in ‘Romeo and Juliet,’ Stephano in the ‘Tempest,’ Francis Flute in ‘A Midsummer-night's Dream,’ were seen, and he was, 12 March 1816, the first Bailie Mucklethrift in Daniel Terry's version of ‘Guy Mannering.’ On 23 September 1818 he was the original French Ambassador in Reynolds's ‘Burgomaster of Saardam,’ and 13 October, the original Argus in the ‘Barber of Seville;’ on 17 April the first Saddletree in the ‘Heart of Midlothian.’

Simmons played on 8 September 1819 his old part of Moses in the ‘School for Scandal.’ He died suddenly of apoplexy three days later.

Simmons was a useful unostentatious actor to whom very few test characters were assigned. His best parts were Mordecai in ‘Love à la Mode,’ Master Matthew Fainwou'd in ‘Raising the Wind,’ and Alibi in the ‘Sleep Walker.’ His exclamation, ‘What do you think of that, eh?’ is said to have been as popular as John Liston's ‘I hope I don't intrude.’ He was very natural in his style, which, however, had no great variety, his happiest expression being that of ‘a silly importance hurt by neglect.’ He was a good comic singer, had great freedom of action, and was popular in pantomime. He was very useful in taking at short notice parts for which absent actors had been cast, and in comic waiters and old men showed much genuine and unforced humour with no trace of affectation or extravagance. Though his voice was powerful, Simmons was small in person, and was popularly called ‘Little Simmons.’ Henry Erskine Johnston once at rehearsal carried him on the stage on his shoulders, both covered with a long cloak, in order to parody Lacy, who was remarkably tall, and was sensitive on the subject (see Genest, vii. 552). Two portraits of him by Samuel De Wilde as Master Matthew in ‘Every Man in his Humour’ in different scenes, and a portrait by Turmeau, were in the Mathews collection in the Garrick Club. A coloured portrait by Dewilde as Baron Munchausen in ‘Harlequin Munchausen’ was in Terry's ‘Theatrical Gallery.’
