= Henry Siddons =

English actor and theatrical manager

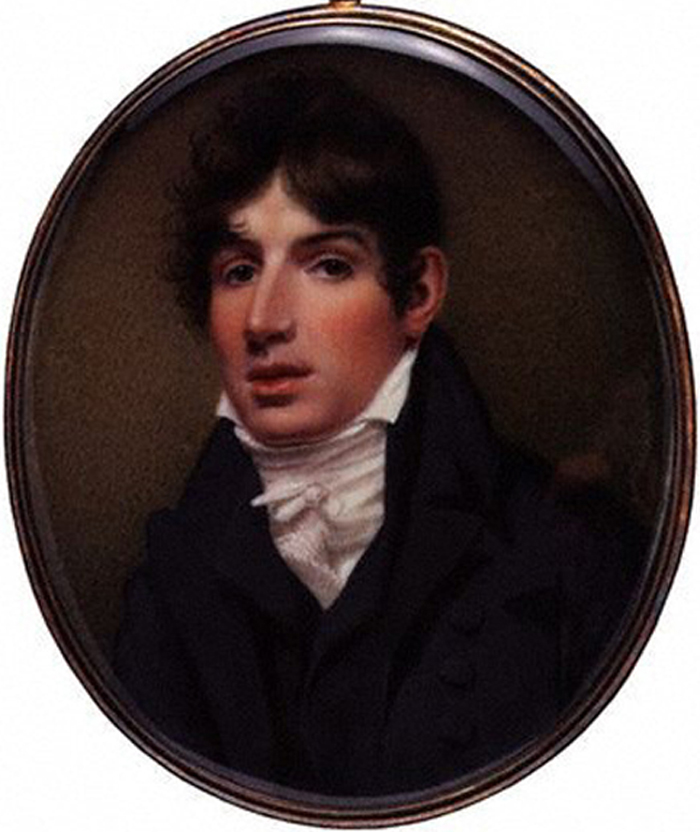
Henry Siddons, 1808 miniature by Samuel John Stump

Henry Siddons (4 October 1774 – 12 April 1815) was an English actor and theatrical manager, now remembered as a writer on gesture.

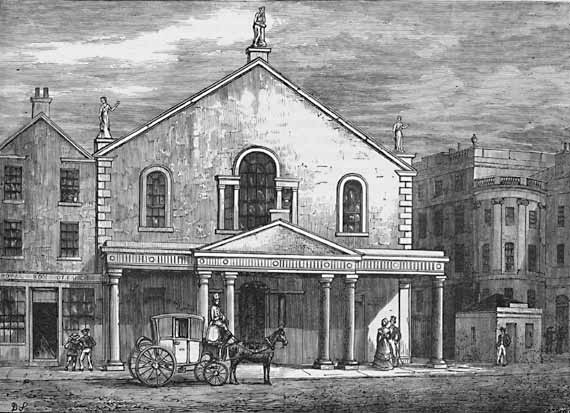
Theatre Royal, Edinburgh

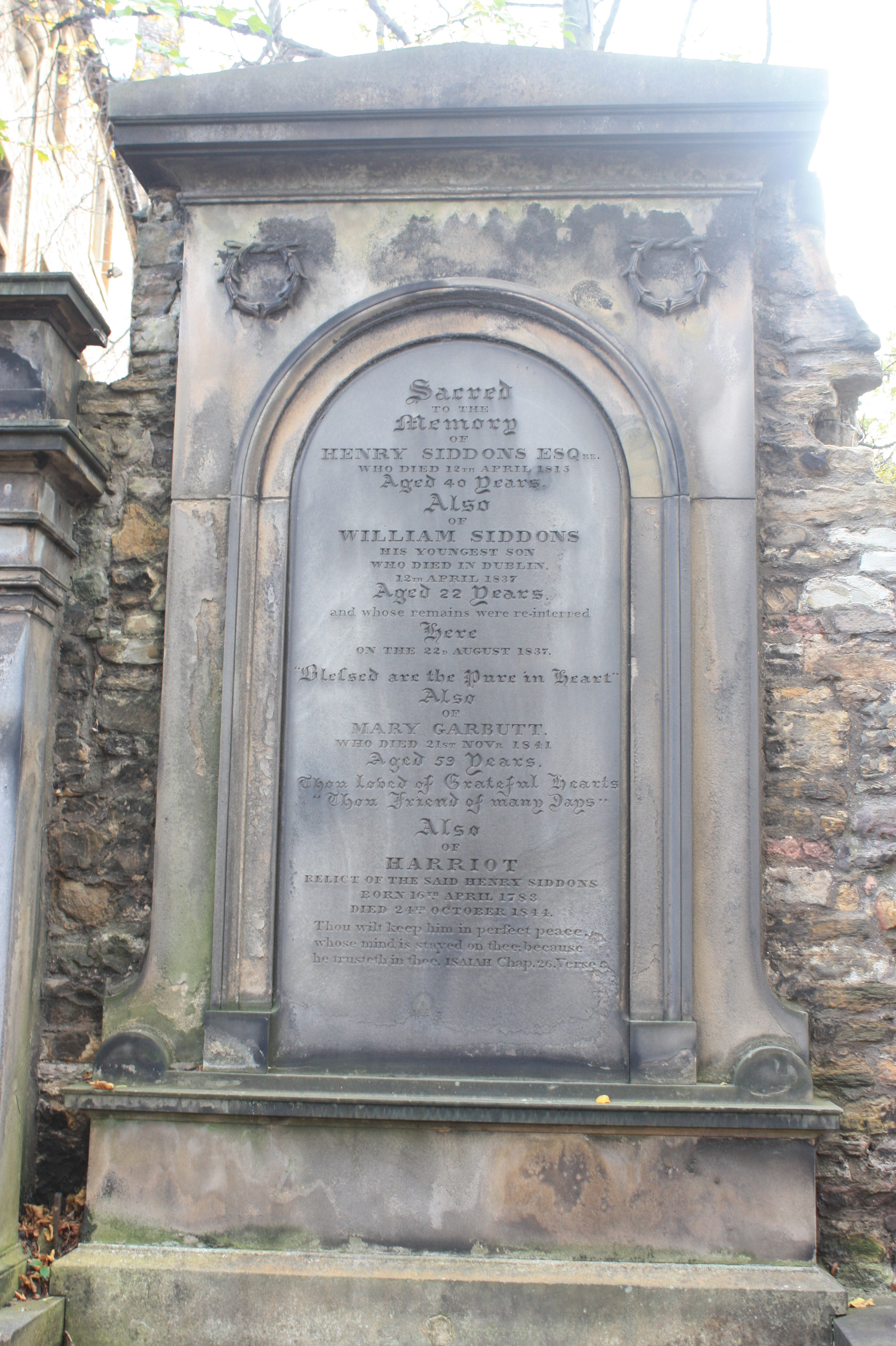
The grave of Henry Siddons, Greyfriars Kirkyard

== Life ==
Siddons was the eldest child of Sarah Siddons, and was educated at Charterhouse School, being intended by his mother for the church. He, however, joined the Covent Garden Theatre company, and made his first appearance as Herman in a play called Integrity, on 8 October 1801. His future wife, Harriet Murray, the sister of William Murray, played in the same piece. His mother withdrew objections to his becoming an actor, and acted Lady Randolph to his Douglas on 21 May 1802, on the occasion of his benefit. He married Harriet Murray on 22 June 1802, and remained a member of the Covent Garden Theatre until the spring of 1805.

On 21 September 1805 Siddons made his first appearance at Drury Lane Theatre, playing the Prince of Wales to Robert William Elliston's Hotspur in Henry IV. On 7 October he appeared as Romeo, and on the following evening as Sir G. Touchwood in the Belle's Stratagem. During his time at Drury Lane he played a variety of parts, including Banquo, Jaffier, George Barnwell, Douglas (in Percy), Claudio (in Much Ado About Nothing), and Rolla. He ended his connection with the London stage at the close of the season 1808–9. Largely through Sir Walter Scott's influence, he then secured the Edinburgh theatre licence (patent), and opened at the Theatre Royal, at the east end of Princes Street, on 14 November 1809 with The Honey Moon, in which he played the Duke; his wife appeared as Juliana.

On starting his managerial career, Siddons aimed at producing plays with greater efficiency in all directions than before, at the Edinburgh Theatre; he was encouraged and supported by Scott. Siddons had an eye for talent, bringing on Daniel Terry and William Oxberry. Joanna Baillie's The Family Legend was produced by Siddons on 29 January 1810. On 15 January 1811 Siddons produced the Lady of the Lake; an adaptation in which he himself played Fitzjames. But he was fighting an uphill battle, and lost much money.

In Edinburgh, Siddons lived first at 3 Maitland Street then spent his final years at 3 Forth Street (only 5 minutes walk from the Theatre Royal). He also managed the Theatre Royal in Castle Street, Dundee, which opened on 27 June 1810. Productions in the first season included a comedy entitled The West Indian, a farce called Fortune's Frolic and a series of Shakespeare plays in which Siddon's uncle, Stephen Kemble, was a popular Falstaff. Productions in 1812 included Everyone Has His Fault by Elizabeth Inchbald (1793), Tekeli or The Siege of Montgatz by Theodore Hook (1806), Blue-Beard by George Colman (1798) and his own adaptation of The Lady of the Lake by Walter Scott (1811). In 1813–14, productions included The Sleep Walker by W.C. Oulton (1812), The White Cat or Harlequin in Fairy Wood by Henry Smart and James Kirby (1811), Shakespeare's Twelfth Night (1602), Venice Preserved by Thomas Otway (1682) and The Tragedy of Jane Shore by Nicolas Rowe (1714).

Siddons died in Edinburgh on 12 April 1815. His sister, Cecilia Siddons, later married George Combe, a prominent Edinburgh lawyer, and the founder of the Edinburgh Phrenological Society. He was buried in Greyfriars Kirkyard in the centre of the city. A large monument was erected to him in the south-west corner, just left of the entrance to the Covenanters Prison. His wife Harriet Siddons is buried with him. His son, William Siddons, died in Dublin but was reburied with his father.

His wife Harriet Siddons and children continued to live in Edinburgh after his death. Harriet and her brother William Murray took over the running of the Theatre Royal.

== Works ==
Siddons adapted a work by Johann Jakob Engel, Ideen zu Einer Mimik from 1785; Engel was then director of the National Theatre in Berlin. It appeared as Illustrations of Gesture and Action (1807). This book was consulted by Charles Darwin during the preparation of his The Expression of the Emotions in Man and Animals, published in 1872. The introduction explains the need to replace the references specific to German drama, rather than simply translate. The actual effect is more an uneasy grafting of techniques from the German neo-classical school of acting, onto a British stock. The 1822 edition also draws on the Essay on Gesture of Michael William Sharp.

He also wrote some plays; of one, The Friend of the Family, Scott wrote, "Siddons's play was truly flat, but not unprofitable". Other pieces by him were Time's a Tell-tale, and Tale of Terror, or a Castle without a Spectre (produced at Covent Garden on 12 May 1803).
