= Harriett Litchfield =

British actress (1777–1854)

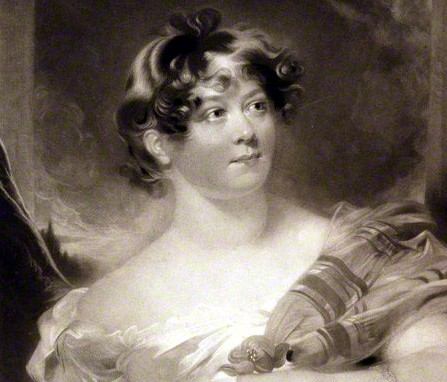
- Born: 4 March 1777
- Died: 11 January 1854 (aged 76); London, England
- Children: 6
- Parent: John Sylvester Hay (father)

Harriett Litchfield or Miss Sylvester Hay (4 March 1777 – 11 January 1854) was a British actress.

== Life ==
Sylvester Hay's birth is considered to be on 4 March 1777. Her paternal grandfather had been the vicar of Malden, but her father, John Sylvester Hay, was a ship's surgeon serving onboard the third-rate ship of the line HMS Nassau. He was also the head surgeon at the Royal Hospital in Calcutta and he may have managed a theatre. He died in his thirties leaving his daughter who was then nine.

Hay appeared first as an actress in Richmond where she was encouraged by Dorothea Jordan. She reputedly received a letter from Robbie Burns inviting her back to Scotland after she went there in 1793. The following year she became Mrs Litchfield. Her new husband was a civil servant who had written a few prologues and epilogues. After a brief gap she returned to acting in 1796 and she appeared in a benefit performance for Mary Ann Yates in 1797 at The Haymarket.

On 22 March 1802, she appeared in a one woman show at The Haymarket called The Captive by "Monk" Lewis. This gothic monodrama recounts the story of a wife imprisoned by her husband. The stage directions included shrieks, clanking and screaming. Litchfield was complimented for her delivery "in the most perfect manner" as she plays a woman denied any human contact and kept in a modern dungeon. She is not mad but realizes that she will soon be a maniac. The play is thought to have been suggested by one of Mary Wollstonecraft's books. It was said that even the staff of the theatre left in horror. The play was only staged once.

Litchfield died in 1854, most likely in London, after a long marriage and six children.

== Legacy ==
Her portrait painted by Samuel De Wilde as Ophelia was in the Garrick Club, there was a second portrait by Samuel Drummond, A.R.A.
