= Matthew Gregory Lewis =

English Gothic writer (1775–1818)

Matthew Lewis
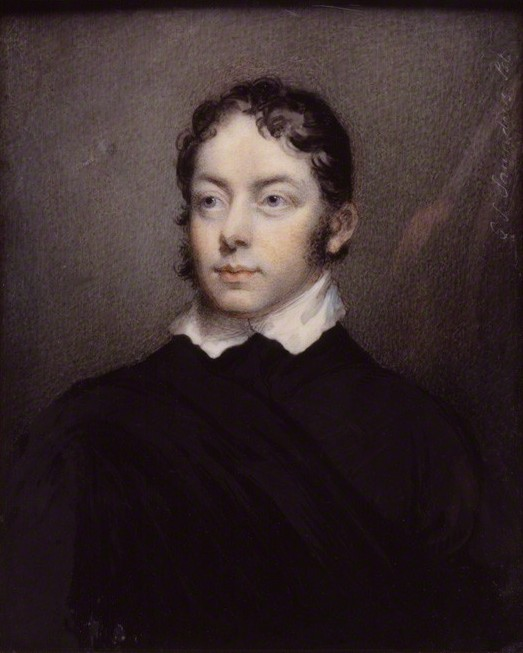
- Portrait by George Lethbridge Saunders, c. 1800

Member of Parliament for Hindon
- In office 1796–1802
- Preceded by: James Adams
- Succeeded by: John Pedley

Personal details
- Born: Matthew Gregory Lewis; 9 July 1775 London, England
- Died: 16 May 1818 (aged 42)
- Education: Christ Church, Oxford
- Occupation: Author
- Writing career
- Language: English
- Genre: Novels
- Notable work: The Monk

Matthew Gregory Lewis (9 July 1775 – 16 May 1818) was an English novelist and dramatist, whose writings are often classified as "Gothic horror". He was frequently referred to as "Monk" Lewis, because of the success of his 1796 Gothic novel The Monk. He also worked as a diplomat, politician and an estate owner in Jamaica.

== Biography ==
=== Family ===
Lewis was the first-born child of Matthew and Frances Maria Sewell Lewis. His father, Matthew Lewis, was the son of William Lewis and Jane Gregory, was born in England in 1750, and attended Westminster School before proceeding to Christ Church, Oxford, where he received his bachelor's degree in 1769 and his master's in 1772. During his time at Westminster, Lewis's parents separated. Mrs Lewis moved to France in this period; while there, she was in continuous correspondence with Matthew. The correspondence between Matthew and his mother consisted of discussion regarding the poor state of his mother's welfare and estate.

That same year, Lewis was appointed Chief Clerk in the War Office. The following year, he married Frances Maria Sewell, a young woman who was very popular at court. She was the third daughter of the senior judge Sir Thomas Sewell and was one of eight children born in his first marriage to Catherine Heath. Her family, like Lewis's, had connections with Jamaica. As a child, she spent her time in Ottershaw. In December 1775, in addition to his War Office post, Lewis became the Deputy Secretary at War. With one exception, he was the first to hold both positions and receive both salaries contemporaneously. Lewis owned considerable property in Jamaica, within four miles of Savanna-la-Mer, or Savanna-la-Mar, which was hit by a devastating earthquake and hurricane in 1779. His son would later inherit this property.

In addition to Matthew Gregory Lewis, Matthew and Frances had three other children: Maria, Barrington, and Sophia Elizabeth. On 23 July 1781, when Matthew was six and his youngest sister one-and-a-half years old, Frances left her husband, taking the music master, Samuel Harrison, as her lover. During their estrangement, Frances lived under a different name, Langley, in order to hide her location from her husband, although he still learned of her whereabouts. On 3 July 1782, Frances gave birth to a child. That same day, hearing of the birth, her estranged husband returned. Afterwards, he began to arrange a legal separation from his wife. After formally accusing his wife of adultery through the Consistory Court of the Bishop of London on 27 February 1783, he petitioned the House of Lords for permission to bring about a bill of divorce. However, these bills were rarely granted and it was rejected when brought to a vote. Consequently, Matthew and Frances remained married until his death in 1812. Frances, though withdrawing from society and temporarily moving to France, was always supported financially by her husband and then later, her son. She later returned to London and then finished her life at Leatherhead, rejoining society and even becoming a lady-in-waiting to the Princess of Wales. Frances and her son remained quite close, with her taking on the responsibility of helping him with his literary career. She even became a published author, much to her son's dislike.

Lewis had a tumultuous relationship with the mistresses his father took on, always siding with his exiled mother in family disputes. His rudeness to such women brought him to the perpetual verge of disinheritance, a threat commonly held over his head and sometimes acted on throughout his lifetime.

Lewis's sisters (especially Lady Lushington) often suggested edits for Lewis's work aimed at making them more acceptable to the public, and went so far as to compose their own drafts of his plays. He rejected all such suggestions.

Lewis was also in a long-term relationship with William Kelly, brother of Attorney General for England and Wales Fitzroy Kelly.

=== Education ===
Lewis began his education at a preparatory school called Marylebone Seminary under the Rev. Dr John Fountayne, Dean of York. Fountayne was a friend of both the Lewis and Sewell families. There Lewis learned Latin, Greek, French, writing, arithmetic, drawing, dancing, and fencing. He and his classmates were permitted to converse only in French throughout the day. Like many of his classmates, Lewis used the Marylebone Seminary as a stepping stone, proceeding from there to Westminster School, like his father, at the age of eight. There he acted in the Town Boys' Play as Falconbridge in King John and then My Lord Duke in James Townley's farce, High Life Below Stairs.

Again like his father, he entered Christ Church, Oxford on 27 April 1790 at the age of 15. He graduated with a bachelor's degree in 1794 and earned a master's degree from the same college in 1797. Lewis frequently complained about the obligation to learn classical languages at Oxford, and spent much of the actual time of his degree abroad in Germany working as a German diplomat. It was during this period he became acquainted with Goethe.

=== Professional life ===
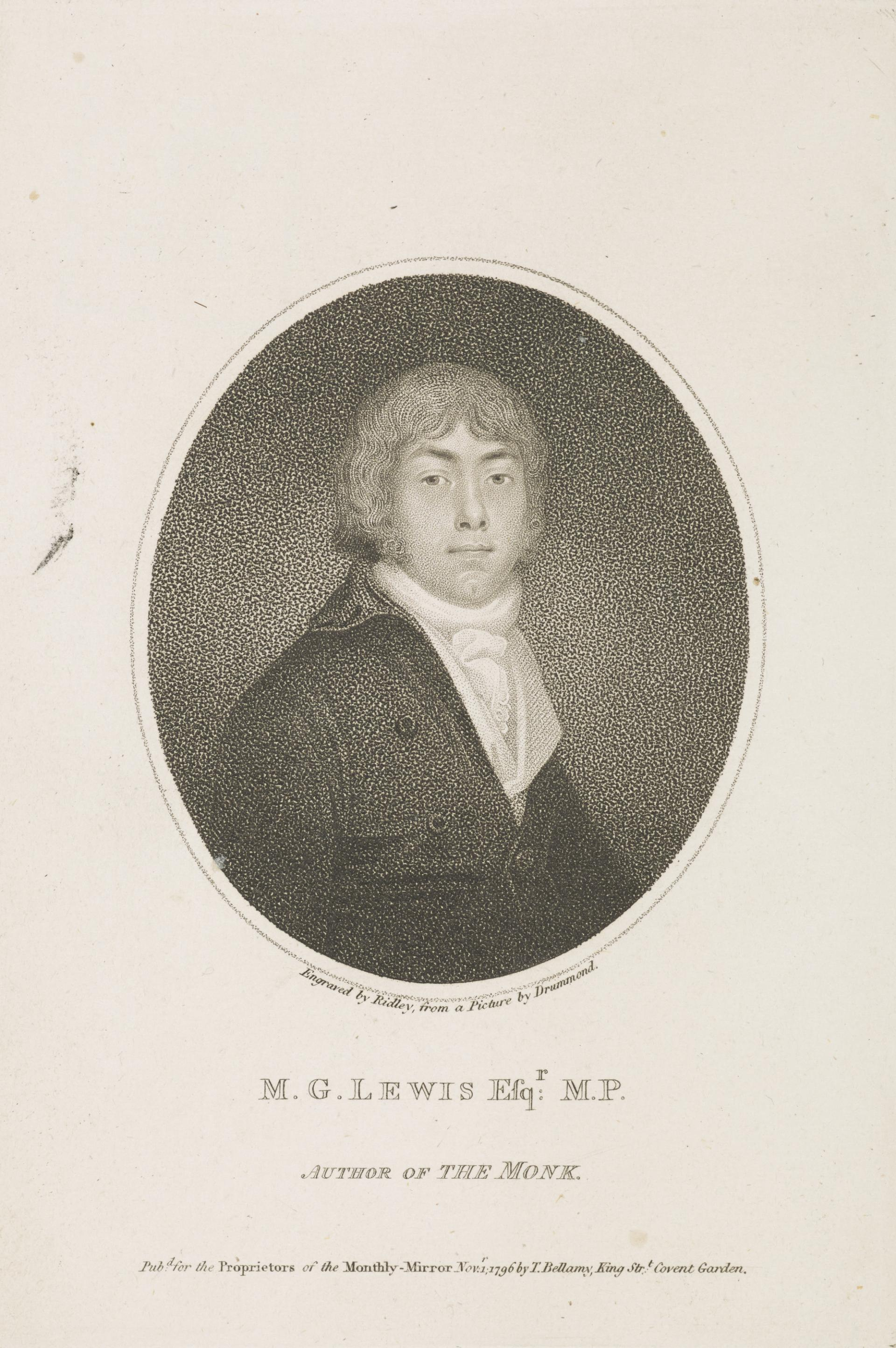
Engraving of Lewis featured in the October 1796 issue of The Monthly Mirror

Intended for a diplomatic career like his father, Lewis spent most of his school vacations abroad, studying modern languages. His travels sent him to London, Chatham, Scotland, and the continent at least twice, including Paris in 1791 and Weimar, Germany in 1792–1793. During these travels, he enjoyed spending time in society, a trait that he retained throughout his life. In the same period, he began translating existing works and writing his own plays.

In 1791, he sent his mother a copy of a farce that he had written named The Epistolary Intrigue. Though he intended the play to be performed at London's Drury Lane, it was rejected there and then later by the neighbouring Covent Garden. He supposedly completed a two-volume novel in the same period. This survives only in fragments in the posthumously published The Life and Correspondence of M. G. Lewis. In March 1792, Lewis translated the French opera Felix and sent it to Drury Lane, hoping to earn money for his mother. While he tried to write a novel like Horace Walpole's The Castle of Otranto, he mainly adhered to theatre, writing The East Indian. However, it would be seven years before this appeared on stage at Drury Lane. In Germany, he even translated Wieland's Oberon, a difficult work of poetry which earned him the respect of his acquaintance Johann Wolfgang von Goethe.

While Lewis pursued these literary ambitions, mainly to earn money for his mother, he gained through his father's influence a position as an attaché to the British embassy in The Hague. He arrived on 15 May 1794 and remained until December of the same year. He found at local bars (his favourite being Madame de Matignon's Salon) friends among visiting French aristocracy fleeing revolutionary France, but nonetheless, Lewis saw The Hague as a place of boredom and disliked its Dutch citizens.

There Lewis produced in ten weeks his romance Ambrosio or The Monk, which was published anonymously in the summer of the following year and immediately gained him celebrity. However, some passages were such that about a year after its appearance an injunction to restrain its sale was obtained. In the second edition, Lewis cited himself as the author and as a Member of Parliament (for Hindon in Wiltshire), and removed what he assumed were the objectionable passages, but the work retained much of its horrific character. Lord Byron in English Bards and Scotch Reviewers wrote of "Wonder-working Lewis, Monk or Bard / Who fain wouldst make Parnassus a churchyard; / Even Satan's self with thee might dread to dwell, / And in thy skull discern a deeper hell." The Marquis de Sade also praised Lewis in his essay "Reflections on the Novel".

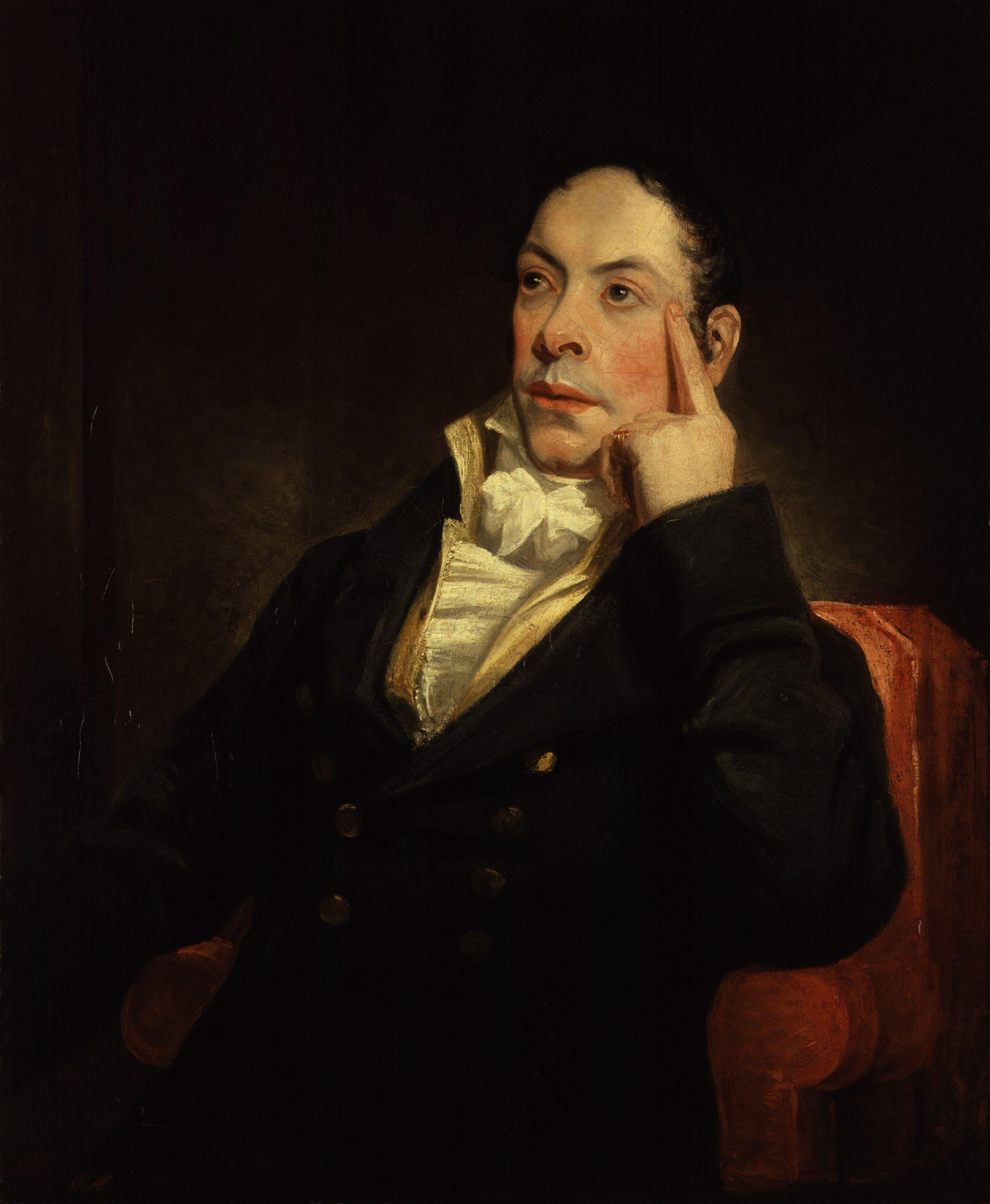
Matthew Gregory Lewis, by Henry William Pickersgill, 1809

On 22 March 1802 Harriett Litchfield appeared in a Gothic monodrama at The Haymarket called The Captive by Lewis. This recounts the story of a wife imprisoned by her husband. The stage directions included details designed to improve the Gothic situation. Litchfield was complimented for her delivery "in the most perfect manner", but she plays a woman denied any human contact and kept in a modern dungeon. She is not mad but realises that she will soon be a maniac. The play is thought to have been suggested by one of Mary Wollstonecraft's books. It was said that even the staff of the theatre left in horror. The play was staged only once.

Lewis held two estates in Jamaica: Cornwall estate in Westmoreland Parish and Hordley estate in Saint Thomas Parish. According to the slave registers, Hordley was co-owned with George Scott and Matthew Henry Scott and their shares were purchased by Lewis in 1817, thus making him sole owner of more than 500 slaves.

On 18 August 1816, the year without a summer, Lewis visited Percy Bysshe Shelley and Mary Shelley in Geneva, Switzerland, where he recounted five ghost stories, one of them a poem written for the Princess of Wales, which Shelley recorded in his "Journal at Geneva (including ghost stories) and on return to England, 1816".

Lewis visited his estates in Jamaica in 1818. During his visit, he saw William Adamson's production of Adelgitha, and complained about the performance of John Castello, the "West Indian Roscius" who played the role of Lothair. He died of yellow fever on board ship whilst sailing back and was buried at sea.

The Life and Correspondence of M. G. Lewis, in two volumes, was published in 1839. The Effusions of Sensibility, his first novel, was never completed.

== Reception of his work ==
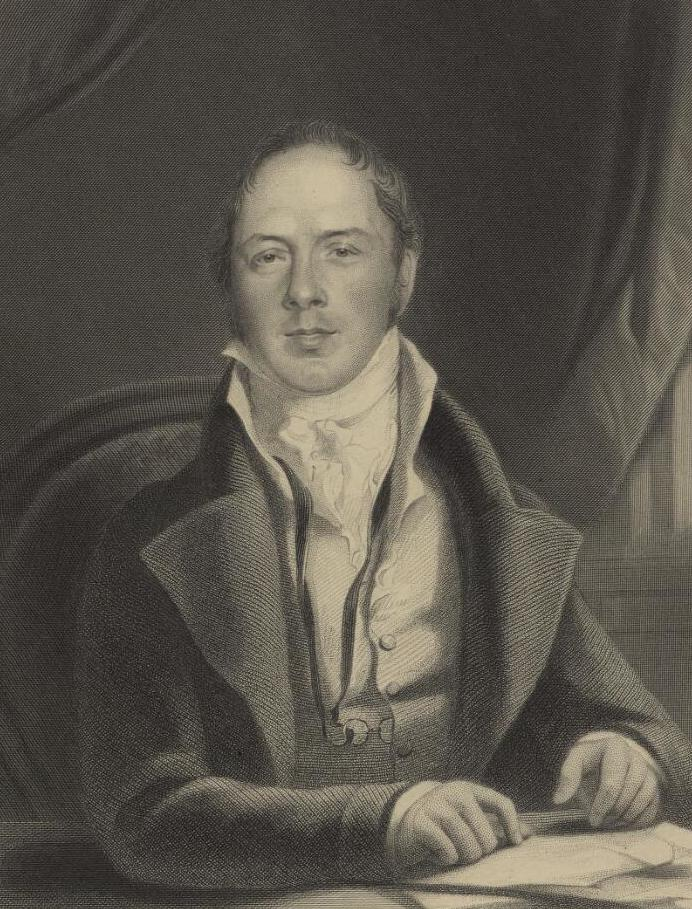
Engraving of Lewis in later life, by William Holl

As a writer, Lewis is typically classified as writing in the Gothic horror genre, along with the authors Charles Maturin and Mary Shelley. Lewis was most assuredly influenced by Ann Radcliffe's The Mysteries of Udolpho and William Godwin's Caleb Williams. In fact, Lewis actually wrote a letter to his mother a few months before he began writing The Monk, stating that he saw a resemblance between the villain Montoni from The Mysteries of Udolpho and himself.

Lewis took Radcliffe's obsession with the supernatural and Godwin's narrative drive and interest in crime and punishment, but Lewis differed with his literary approach. Whereas Radcliffe would allude to the imagined horrors under the genre of terror-Gothic, Lewis defined himself by disclosing the details of the gruesome scenes, earning him the title of a Gothic horror novelist.

Lewis was often criticized for a lack of originality. Though much of his career was spent translating the texts of others, these criticisms more often refer to his novel The Monk and his play The Castle Spectre. Beginning with The Monk, Lewis starts the novel with an advertisement:

The first idea of this Romance was suggested by the story of the Santon Barsisa, related in The Guardian. – The Bleeding Nun is a tradition still credited in many parts of Germany; and I have been told, that the ruins of the Castle of Lauenstein, which She is supposed to haunt, may yet be seen upon the borders of Thuringia. – The Water-King, from the third to twelfth stanza, is the fragment of an original Danish Ballad – And Belerma and Durandarte is translated from some stanzas to be found in a collection of old Spanish poetry, which contains also the popular song of Gayferos and Melesindra, mentioned in Don Quixote. – I have now made a full avowal of all the plagiarisms of which I am aware myself; but I doubt not, many more may be found, of which I am at present totally unconscious.

While some critics, like those of The Monthly Review, saw combinations of previous works as a new invention, others, including Samuel Taylor Coleridge, have argued that by revealing where he found inspiration, Lewis surrendered part of his authorship. This bothered Lewis so much that in addition to a note in the fourth edition of The Monk, he included notes to the text when he published The Castle Spectre as a way to counteract any accusations of plagiarism. The success of the tactic is debatable.

Lewis's monodrama The Captive tells of a woman consigned to a mental asylum by her husband against her will, who gradually drives herself mad through the terrible spectacles she witnesses there. It is a short script of only a few pages, but one that was performed over a few hours, giving the impression that much of the work must have taken place in slow recreation of physical violence within the asylum. The performance was shut down halfway through, on account of ladies in the audience fainting. The Morning Chronicle's review suggests "the tears of an audience have generally been accounted the highest species of applause... [but] a poet must have an odd taste who would be rewarded with hysteric fits." This suggests that Lewis himself took the attitude of enjoying throwing audiences into "fits" and being "rewarded" by it.

Lewis provided many epilogues and introductions for other performances put on in the Drury Lane Theatre, most often for Thomas Holcroft. Lewis would insert ghosts into otherwise non-supernatural plays. These ghosts would complain about the lack of ghosts in said non-supernatural plays. "I see not one Ghost through the whole of the part / Cannot once find a place for a Tragedy start" (from Holcroft's Knave or Not?, 1798). This may represent purposeful self-mockery.

Lewis wrote in 1801 a satire on the reception of his work under the pseudonym "Maritius Moonshine", in which he slanders his own writings as "loathesome [sic] spectacles" and insults himself for being a poor MP ("thy brighter parts are lost, / And the state's welfare by a Goblin croft"). In the preface to Alfonso, King of Castile, Lewis writes "that this play is stupid, let it be said". Lewis consistently indicates that he is fully aware of the public opinion of his works as poor and sensational, embraced these definitions, and did not care about them. Almost every one of his works is prefaced by admissions and lists of "minor plagiarisms".

== Works ==
=== Novels ===
- The Effusions of Sensibility (unfinished)
- The Monk: A Romance (3 vols, 1796, revised 1798)
- The Bravo of Venice (1805)

=== Poems ===
- Poems (1812)
- The Isle of Devils (1816)

=== Translation ===
- Feudal Tyrants; or, The Counts of Carlsheim and Sargans. A romance (1806)
  - free translation of Benedikte Naubert's Elisabeth, Erbin von Toggenburg, oder Geschichte der Frauen von Sargans in der Schweiz (1789)

=== Short stories ===
- "My Uncle's Garret Window"
- "Oberon's Henchman or The Legend of the Three Sisters"

=== Collections ===
- Tales of Terror (1799)
- Tales of Wonder (1801)
- Romantic Tales (1808)

=== Plays ===
- Village Virtues: A Dramatic Satire (1796)
- The Castle Spectre (1796)
- The Minister: A Tragedy, in Five Acts (1797)
- The East Indian: A Comedy in Five Acts (1800)
- Adelmorn, the Outlaw (1801)
- Alfonso, King of Castile: A Tragedy in Five Acts (1801)
- The Captive (1803)
- Rugantino (1805)
- Adelgitha; or, The Fruit of a Single Error. A Tragedy in Five Acts (1806)
- One O'Clock, Or, The Knight and Wood Daemon, A Grand Musical Romance (1811)
- Timour the Tartar (1811)

=== Non-fiction ===
- More Wonders: an heroic epistle to M. G. Lewis [A satire on his works] with a Praescript Extraordinary and An Ode on the Union (1801)
- Journal of a West India Proprietor Kept during a Residence in the Island of Jamaica (1833)
- The Life and Correspondence of M. G. Lewis (1839)

== Sources ==
- Leigh Rayment's Historical List of MPs

Parliament of Great Britain
Preceded by James Wildman; James Adams	Member of Parliament for Hindon; 1796–1801; With: James Wildman	Succeeded by Parliament of the United Kingdom
Parliament of the United Kingdom
Preceded by Parliament of Great Britain	Member of Parliament for Hindon; 1801–1802; With: James Wildman	Succeeded by Thomas Wallace; John Pedley
