= Scottish literature in the eighteenth century =

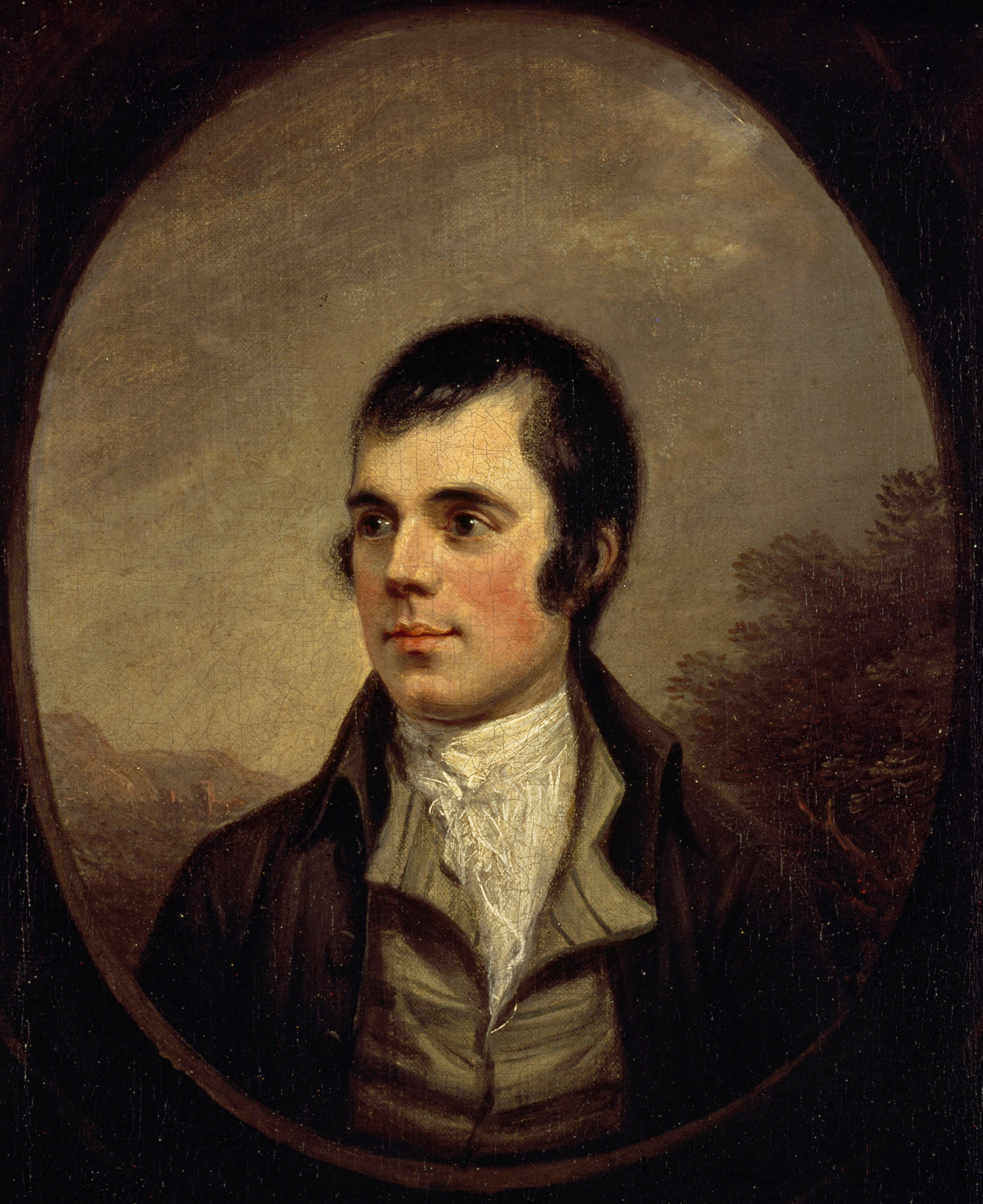
Robert Burns, considered by many the national poet, in Alexander Nasmyth's portrait of 1787

Scottish literature in the eighteenth century is literature written in Scotland or by Scottish writers in the eighteenth century. It includes literature written in English, Scottish Gaelic and Scots, in forms including poetry, drama and novels. After the Union in 1707 Scottish literature developed a distinct national identity. Allan Ramsay led a "vernacular revival", the trend for pastoral poetry and developed the Habbie stanza. He was part of a community of poets working in Scots and English who included William Hamilton of Gilbertfield, Robert Crawford, Alexander Ross, William Hamilton of Bangour, Alison Rutherford Cockburn, and James Thomson. The eighteenth century was also a period of innovation in Gaelic vernacular poetry. Major figures included Rob Donn Mackay, Donnchadh Bàn Mac an t-Saoir, Uillean Ross and Alasdair mac Mhaighstir Alasdair, who helped inspire a new form of nature poetry. James Macpherson was the first Scottish poet to gain an international reputation, claiming to have found poetry written by Ossian. Robert Burns is widely regarded as the national poet.

Drama was pursued by Scottish playwrights in London such as Catherine Trotter and David Crawford, who developed the character of the stage Scot. Newburgh Hamilton produced comedies and later wrote the libretto for Handel's Samson (1743). James Thomson's plays often dealt with the contest between public duty and private feelings. David Mallet's Eurydice (1731) was accused of being a coded Jacobite play. The opera Masque of Alfred (1740) was a collaboration between Thompson, Mallet and composer Thomas Arne, with Thompson supplying the lyrics to the patriotic song Rule, Britannia!. Inside Scotland drama faced hostility from the Kirk. Allan Ramsay was a major supporter of Scottish theatre, establishing a small theatre in Carruber's Close in Edinburgh, and there is evidence of companies elsewhere in Scotland, but the 1737 Licensing Act made their activities illegal and these theatres soon closed. A three-decade period followed where institutional and organised drama was in abeyance. The subterfuge of offering a free drama at the end of a musical performance was adopted. Douglas, by minister John Home, was first performed in 1756 in Edinburgh. It was a success in both Scotland and England but caused a controversy with the kirk that probably led Home to leave Scotland for London. Other emigres to London included Tobias Smollett. Despite the opposition of the church theatre going began to emerge as a regular part of elite life in Scotland. The government granted the first licence to a Scottish theatre under the act in 1767. In the later eighteenth century, many plays were written for and performed by small amateur companies and were not published and so most have been lost. Towards the end of the century there were "closet dramas", primarily designed to be read. Important Scottish playwrights included Henry Mackenzie, John Logan's, Archibald Maclaren and Joanna Baillie.

In this century the novel emerged as a major element of Scottish literary and critical life. Tobias Smollett's picaresque novels, such as The Adventures of Roderick Random and The Adventures of Peregrine Pickle mean that he is often seen as Scotland's first novelist. Other Scots who contributed to the development of the novel in the eighteenth century include Henry Mackenzie, John Moore and Jean Marishall.

== Poetry ==
After the Union in 1707 Scottish literature developed a distinct national identity and began to enjoy an international reputation. Allan Ramsay (1686–1758) was the most important literary figure of the era, often described as leading a "vernacular revival". He laid the foundations of a reawakening of interest in older Scottish literature, publishing The Ever Green (1724), a collection that included many major poetic works of the Stewart period. He led the trend for pastoral poetry, helping to develop the Habbie stanza, which would be later be used by Robert Burns as a poetic form. His Tea-Table Miscellany (1724–37) contained old Scots folk material, his own poems in the folk style and "gentilizings" of Scots poems in the English neo-classical style. Ramsay was part of a community of poets working in Scots and English. These included William Hamilton of Gilbertfield (c. 1665–1751), Robert Crawford (1695–1733), Alexander Ross (1699–1784), the Jacobite William Hamilton of Bangour (1704–54), socialite Alison Rutherford Cockburn (1712–94), and poet and playwright James Thomson's (1700–48), most famous for the nature poetry of his Seasons.

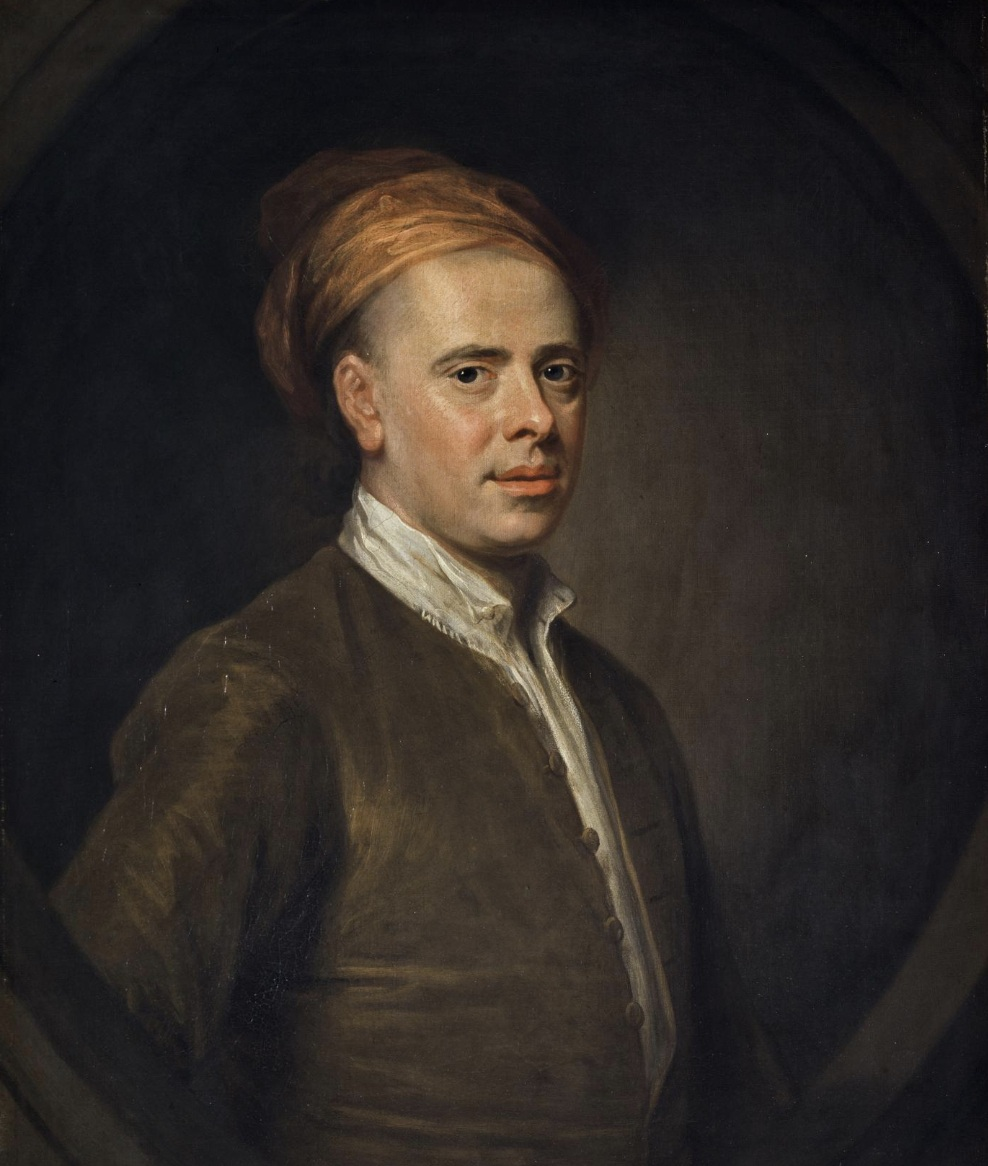
Alan Ramsay, the most influential literary figure in early eighteenth-century Scotland

The eighteenth century was also a period of innovation in Gaelic vernacular poetry. Major figures included the satirist Rob Donn Mackay (Robert Mackay, 1714–78), the hunter-poet Donnchadh Bàn Mac an t-Saoir (Duncan Ban MacIntyre, 1724–1812) and Uillean Ross (William Ross, 1762–90), most noted for his anguished love songs. The most significant figure in the tradition was Alasdair mac Mhaighstir Alasdair (Alasdair MacDonald, c. 1698–1770), who emerged as the nationalist poet of the Jacobite cause and whose poetry marks a shift away from the clan-based panegyric tradition. His interest in traditional forms can be seen in his most significant poem Clanranald's Gallery. He also mixed these traditions with influences from the Lowlands, including Thompson's Seasons, which helped inspire a new form of nature poetry in Gaelic, which was not focused on their relations to human concerns.

James Macpherson (1736–96) was the first Scottish poet to gain an international reputation, claiming to have found poetry written by Ossian, he published translations that acquired international popularity, being proclaimed as a Celtic equivalent of the Classical epics. Fingal written in 1762 was speedily translated into many European languages, and its deep appreciation of natural beauty and the melancholy tenderness of its treatment of the ancient legend did more than any single work to bring about the Romantic movement in European, and especially in German literature, influencing Herder and Goethe. Eventually it became clear that the poems were not direct translations from the Gaelic, but flowery adaptations made to suit the aesthetic expectations of his audience.

Robert Burns (1759–96) was highly influenced by the Ossian cycle. Burns, an Ayrshire poet and lyricist, is widely regarded as the national poet of Scotland and a major figure in the Romantic movement. As well as making original compositions, Burns also collected folk songs from across Scotland, often revising or adapting them. His poem (and song) "Auld Lang Syne" is often sung at Hogmanay (the last day of the year), and "Scots Wha Hae" served for a long time as an unofficial national anthem of the country. Burns's poetry drew upon a substantial familiarity with and knowledge of Classical, Biblical, and English literature, as well as the Scottish Makar tradition. Burns was skilled in writing not only in the Scots language but also in the Scottish English dialect of the English language. Some of his works, such as "Love and Liberty" (also known as "The Jolly Beggars"), are written in both Scots and English for various effects. His themes included republicanism, radicalism, Scottish patriotism, anticlericalism, class inequalities, gender roles, commentary on the Scottish Kirk of his time, Scottish cultural identity, poverty, sexuality, and the beneficial aspects of popular socialising.

Major poets writing in the radical tradition of Burns include Alexander Wilson (1766–1813), whose outspoken views forced him into emigration to the US. Major literary figures connected with Romanticism include the poets James Hogg (1770–1835) and Allan Cunningham (1784–1842).

== Drama ==
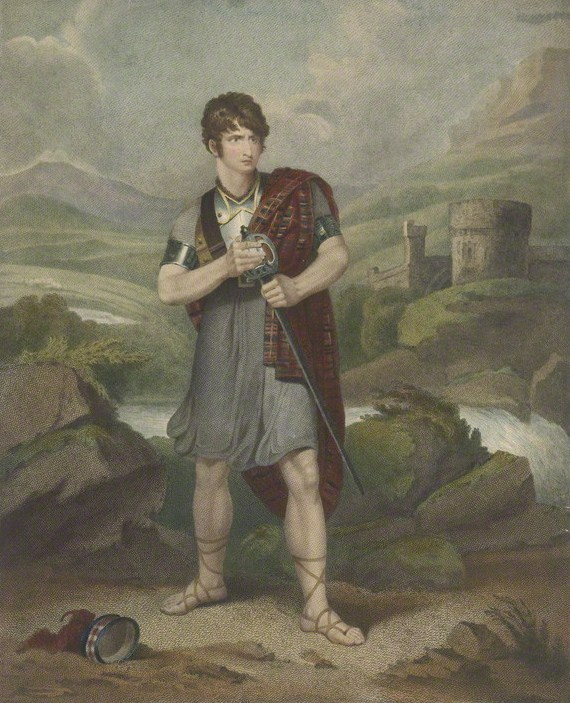
Portrait of Henry Erskine Johnston (1777–1830?), Scottish actor, in the title role of Douglas

Drama was pursued by Scottish playwrights in London such as Catherine Trotter (1679–1749), born in London to Scottish parents and later moving to Aberdeen. Her plays and included the verse-tragedy Fatal Friendship (1698), the comedy Love at a Loss (1700) and the history The Revolution in Sweden (1706). David Crawford's (1665–1726) plays included the Restoration comedies Courtship A-la-Mode (1700) and Love at First Sight (1704). These developed the character of the stage Scot, often a clown, but cunning and loyal. Newburgh Hamilton (1691–1761), born in Ireland of Scottish descent, produced the comedies The Petticoat-Ploter (1712) and The Doating Lovers or The Libertine (1715). He later wrote the libretto for Handel's Samson (1743), closely based on John Milton's Samson Agonistes. James Thomson's plays often dealt with the contest between public duty and private feelings, included Sophonisba (1730), Agamemnon (1738) and Tancrid and Sigismuda (1745), the last of which was an international success. David Mallet's (c. 1705–65) Eurydice (1731) was accused of being a coded Jacobite play and his later work indicates opposition to the Walpole administration. The opera Masque of Alfred (1740) was a collaboration between Thompson, Mallet and composer Thomas Arne, with Thompson supplying the lyrics for his most famous work, the patriotic song Rule, Britannia!.

In Scotland performances were largely limited to those by visiting actors, who faced hostility from the Kirk. In November 1727, Edinburgh Town Council denounced stage plays. The Court of Session reversed the magistrates' pleas, but Rev Robert Wodrow complained of plays as "seminaries of idleness, looseness and sin". A pamphlet of the time described actors as, "the most profligate wretches and vilest vermin that hell ever vomited out... the filth and garbage of the earth, the scum and stain of human nature, the excrement and refuse of all mankind". In 1729, the Scots Company of Comedians, formed for dramatic entertainments, was forced to close. The Edinburgh Company of Players were able to perform in Dundee, Montrose, Aberdeen and regular performances at the Taylor's Hall in Edinburgh under the protection of a Royal Patent. In 1727, Allan Ramsay wrote his Some Hints in Defence of Dramatic Entertainment. Ramsay was instrumental in establishing them in a small theatre in Carruber's Close in Edinburgh. Dundee formed a company of players in 1734. However, the passing of the 1737 Licensing Act made their activities illegal and these theatres soon closed.

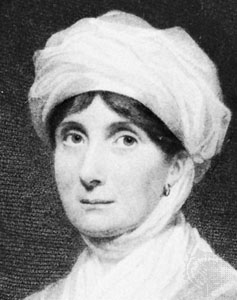
Engraving of playwright Joanna Baillie

The Licensing Act began a three-decade period where institutional and organised drama was in abeyance. Eventually the subterfuge of offering a free drama at the end of a musical performance was adopted. This is known to have been used in Edinburgh from 1739 when The Provoked Husband was performed. From 1741 regular performances were offered after concerts at the Taylor's Hall. Other performances included a production of Hamlet at the opening of a purpose build theatre, the "Cannongate Concert House" in 1747, which operated as a theatre without a licence into the 1760s. Aberdeen's theatres were closed in 1745 and 1751 by the clergy. In 1752, Glasgow's first theatre was burnt down, shortly after George Whitfield complained it was the "Devil's Home". The blank verse tragedy Douglas, by minister John Home, was first performed in 1756 in Edinburgh. It was a success in both Scotland and England for decades, attracting many notable actors, such as Edmund Kean, who made his debut in it, Peg Woffington and Sarah Siddons. Home was hounded by the church authorities for Douglas and this may have driven him to leave his parish and move to work on the London stage. Other emigres to London included Tobias Smollett (1721–71), whose play The Regicide about the death of James I failed to gain a production in the capital, but after his success as a novelist it was published in 1749 and his The Reprisal, a comedy based on his experiences at sea, was delivered by David Garrick at Drury Lane in 1757. Despite the opposition of the church, theatre going began to emerge as a regular part of elite life in Scotland. Performances included Eleanore Carthart, Lady Huston's Coquettes in 1759, John (or James) Baille's political farce Patriotism in 1763, and Andrew Eskine's cross-dressing love farce She's Not Him, He's Not Her in 1764. The British government granted the first licence to a Scottish theatre under the act in 1767 as part of the plans for the building of the New Town in Edinburgh. The new Theatre Royal opened in 1769. In Perth it was 1780 before theatre was properly produced. As late as 1784, the council of Dundee prevented a company from Edinburgh from entering the town.

In the later eighteenth century, many plays were written for and performed by small amateur companies and were not published and so most have been lost. Towards the end of the century there were "closet dramas", primarily designed to be read, rather than performed, including work by James Hogg (1770–1835), John Galt (1779–1839) and Joanna Baillie (1762–1851), often influenced by the ballad tradition and Gothic Romanticism. Henry Mackenzie (1745–1821) was the first Scott to have a play performed at the new Theatre Royal, The Prince of Tunis in 1773. The play went on to success in both Scotland and London and as well as becoming a successful novelist Mackenzie produced plays including The Shipwreck (1784) and Force of Fashion (1789). John Logan's tragedy, Runnamede, was acted in the Edinburgh Theatre in 1783. It reflected contemporary politics in its emphasis on the liberties of the subject, drawing parallels between King John and George III, and for that reason the censorship of the Lord Chamberlain had prevented its production on the London stage. Among the most prolific of Scottish playwrights was Archibald Maclaren (1755–1826) whose The Conjurer; or, the Scotsman in London (1781) inverted the stereotype of the gullible Scot common in London plays. He went on to produce over a hundred plays. The work of Baillie is now seen as particularly significant, although it was more often anonymously published rather than in performance for much of her lifetime. Baillie's first volume of Plays on the Passions was published in 1798 consisted of Count Basil, a tragedy on love, The Tryal, a comedy on love, and De Monfort, a tragedy on hatred. De Monfort was successfully performed in Drury Lane, London before knowledge of her identity emerged and the prejudice against women playwrights began to effect her career.

== Novels ==
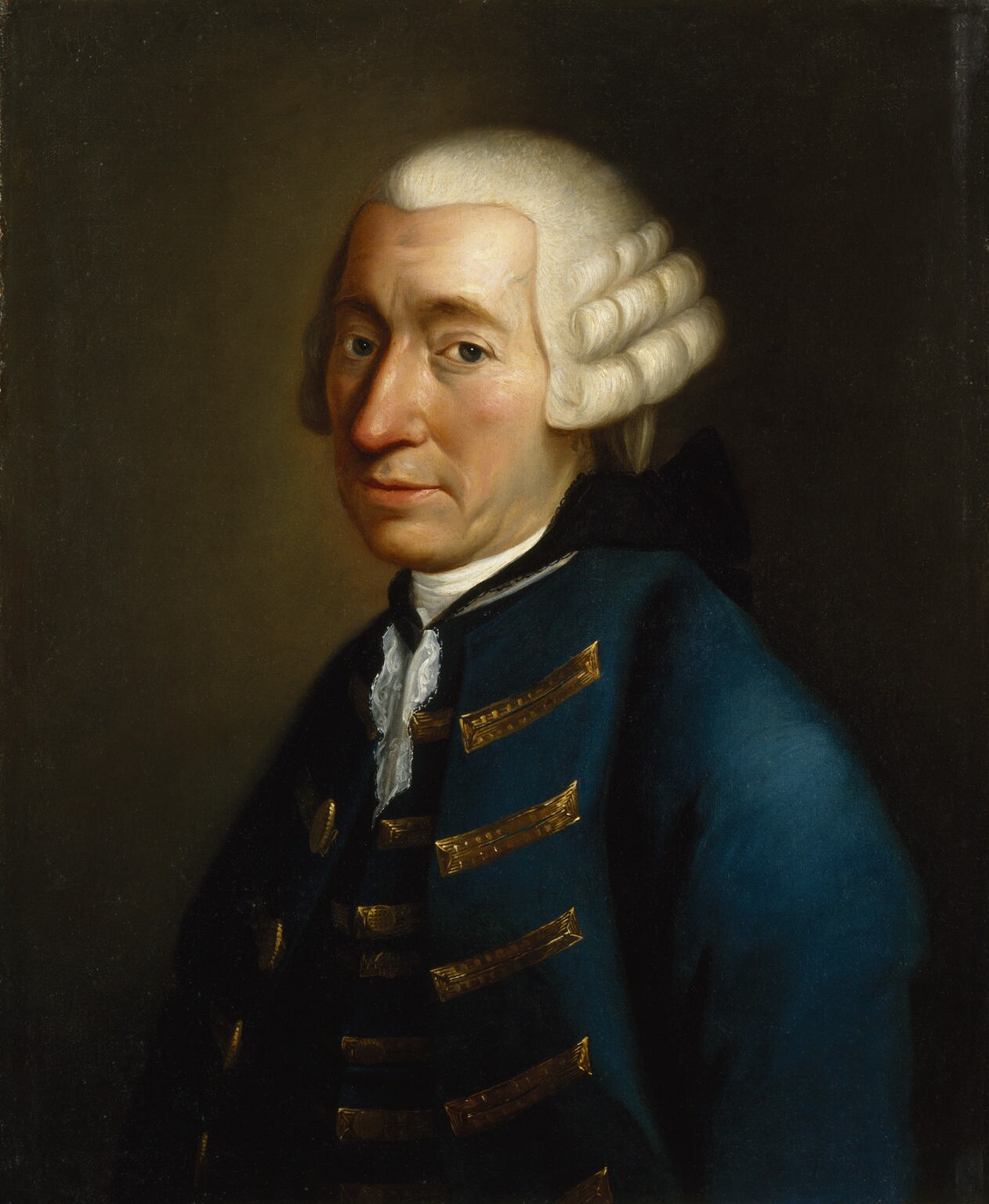
Tobias Smollett, often considered Scotland's first novelist

The novel in its modern form developed rapidly in the eighteenth century and was soon a major element of Scottish literary and critical life. There was a demand in Scotland for the newest novels including Robinson Crusoe (1719), Pamela (1740), Tom Jones (1749) and Evelina (1788). There were weekly reviews of novels in periodicals, the most important of which were The Monthly Review and The Critical Review. Lending libraries were established in Edinburgh, Glasgow and Aberdeen. Private manor libraries were established in estate houses. The universities began to acquire novels and they became part of the curriculum. By the 1770s about thirty novels were being printed in Britain and Ireland every year and there is plentiful evidence that they were being read, particularly by women and students in Scotland. Scotland and Scottish authors made a modest contribution to this early development. About forty full length prose books were printed in Scotland before 1800. One of the earliest was the anonymously authored Select Collection of Oriental Tales (1776).

As well as being a poet, essayist, satirist and playwright, Tobias Smollett is best known for his picaresque novels, such as The Adventures of Roderick Random (1748) and The Adventures of Peregrine Pickle (1751) for which he is often seen as Scotland's first novelist. His most influential novel was his last, the epistolary novel The Expedition of Humphry Clinker (1771). His work would be a major influence on later novelists such as Thackeray and Dickens. Other eighteenth-century novelists included Henry Mackenzie, whose major work The Man of Feeling (1771) was a sentimental novel dealing with human emotions, influenced by Samuel Richardson and Laurence Sterne and the thinking of philosopher David Hume. His later novels, The Man of the World (1773) and Julia de Roubigné (1777) were set in the wilds of America and in France respectively, with the character of the title of the latter being the first female protagonist throughout a Scottish novel. Physician John Moore's novel Zeluco (1789) focused on an anti-hero, the Italian nobleman of the title, and was a major influence on the work of Byron. Female novelists included Jean Marishall (f. 1765–89), who published the epistolary novels, The History of Miss Camilla Cathcart, and Miss Fanny Renton (1766) and The History of Alicia Montague (1767).
