= Alexandra Music Hall =

Coordinates: 55°52′00″N 4°15′22″W

Alexandra Music Hall, also known as the Royal Alexandra Music Hall, and as the Colosseum Hall in the early 1880s, was a music hall situated in the Cowcaddens area of Glasgow, Scotland. Built in 1867 and capable of holding 700 people it was part of the Theatre Royal complex developed by James Baylis. After changing its name to the Bijou Picture Palace in 1908 it continued to operate as a variety-cinema until 1929 before closing due to safety concerns. Scottish Television bought the entire Theatre Royal complex in the 1950s, using the old Alexandra Hall for storage until its demolishing in 1969 to create extra space for colour TV studios to the east of the Theatre Royal.

== Other Reading ==
"The Theatre Royal : Entertaining a Nation " by Graeme Smith published 2008 ISBN 978-0-9559420-0-6
