= Montague Talbot =

Irish stage actor and theatre manager

Montague Talbot (1774–1831) was an Irish stage actor and theatre manager.

He was born in Boston in Colonial America where his father was serving as a captain in the British Army garrison of the city. His father died in 1782 when the ship he was travelling on sunk. He originally studied to be a lawyer in London, before turning to acting. He was suspected of possible involvement in the Ireland Shakespeare forgeries as an acquittance of William Henry Ireland. He made his debut at Covent Garden on 13 January 1794 in Douglas. From 1794 to 1795 he appeared at the Crow Street Theatre in Dublin. He travelled to London for the debut of Ireland's claimed Shakespeare discovery Vortigern and Rowena at the Theatre Royal, Drury Lane, but seems to have returned to Dublin before the play was put on and the hoax was revealed. He acted again at Crow Street until 1798 when he briefly appeared in Liverpool, before joining the Drury Lane company in London in 1799–1800.

The remainder of his career was spent mostly in Scotland and Ireland. He succeeded the previous manager of Belfast's Arthur Street Theatre Thomas Ludford Bellamy, who had himself recently replaced the long-standing Michael Atkins. Between 1808 and 1821 Talbot was manager of the Belfast, Newry and Derry theatres and continued to play leading roles on stage. He persuaded John Philip Kemble to appear at Belfast, and launched the career of Elizabeth O'Neill. In 1812 he returned to London for his first appearance at the Haymarket. From 1821 he acted primarily at the Crow Street Theatre in Dublin while also making occasional performances in Belfast, where he died in April 1831. From 1800 he was married to Emily Talbot, a former actress, with who he had five children.

== Selected roles ==
- Douglas in Douglas by John Home (1794)
- Young Mirable in The Inconstant by George Farquhar (1799)
- Charles Surface in The School for Scandal by Richard Brinsley Sheridan (1800)
- Rezenvelt in De Monfort by Joanna Baillie (1800)
- Algernon in Indiscretion by Prince Hoare (1800)
- The Stranger in The Stranger by Benjamin Thompson (1811)
- The Duke in The Honeymoon by John Tobin (1812)
- Ranger in The Suspicious Husband by Benjamin Hoadly (1812)

== Bibliography ==
- Greene, John C. Theatre in Dublin, 1745-1820: A Calendar of Performances, Volume 6. Lexington Books, 2011.
- Highfill, Philip H, Burnim, Kalman A. & Langhans, Edward A. A Biographical Dictionary of Actors, Actresses, Musicians, Dancers, Managers & Other Stage Personnel in London, 1660-1800, Volume 14. SIU Press, 1973.
- Johnston, Roy. The Musical Life of Nineteenth-Century Belfast. Routledge, 2017.
- Raby, Peter. Fair Ophelia: A Life of Harriet Smithson Berlioz. Cambridge University Press, 2003.
