= James Baylis =

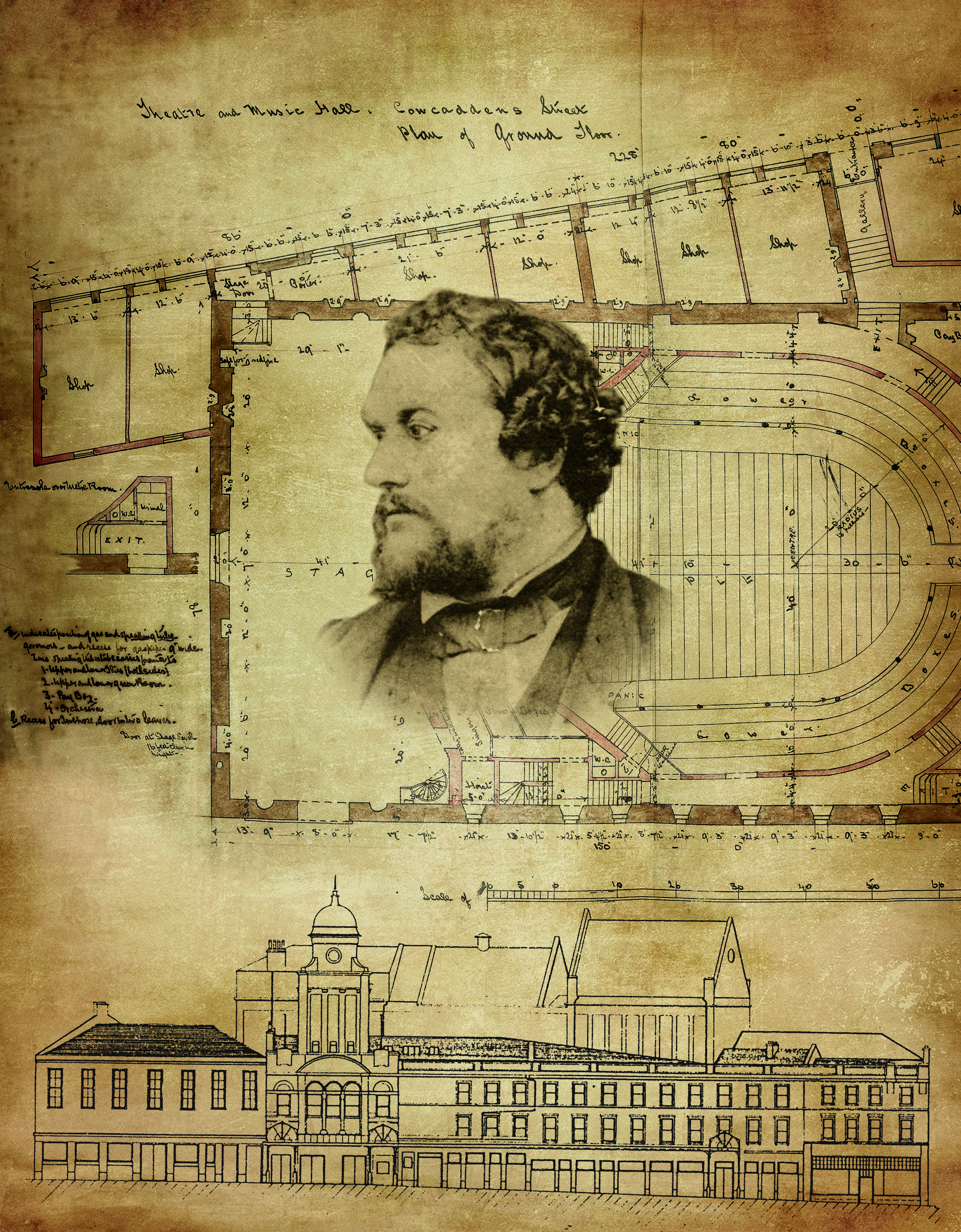
James Baylis 1830–1870, theatre entrepreneur, Glasgow

James Baylis was a theatre entrepreneur and entertainment provider in 19th century Glasgow, Scotland, where he originated music halls and theatres from the 1840s until his death in 1870. One of his major developments was the Theatre Royal, Glasgow which continues today and is owned by Scottish Opera.

Baylis was born in Ireland, the son of a bandmaster in the army, and settled in Glasgow with his wife Christina Ferguson Baylis. He worked as a book keeper in a brewery and in evenings and weekends in the late 1840s was the manager of Sloan's Oddfellows Singing Saloon, Saltmarket, Glasgow Cross, owned by his brother-in-law (husband of his sister, Mary McBirnie Baylis). He was helped in his variety developments by his brother Sam Baylis who became the noted owner of the Baylis Marionnette Company, most active in England and Ireland. James Baylis determined to have his own music halls and theatres.

The first was the Milton Colosseum, in the Milton Arcade, Cowcaddens Cross in 1858, which he ran on "popular prices, good companies, and temperance refreshments". His second opened in 1862 after he bought land in Stockwell Street near Howard Street and built the Scotia Music Hall, also named the Scotia Variety Theatre. Its architect was Robert Black and the Scotia was promoted as the first and largest purpose built music hall for variety in Scotland, and the only one which remained open all year round. Mr and Mrs Baylis set high standards for variety entertainment. In 1875 it was rebuilt, after a fire, to new designs by architects Campbell Douglas and James Sellars. When Christina Baylis died in 1898 it was bought by Moss Empires, created by Edward Moss, and later renamed as The Metropole Theatre.

His third major project was in 1867 when the theatre complex now known as the Theatre Royal, Glasgow opened in Cowcaddens at the corner of Hope Street. It contained the Royal Colosseum & Opera House, where Baylis presented plays, opera, revues and pantomime; and shops, with the smaller Alexandra Music Hall above. Before his death in 1870 he leased the Royal Colosseum to William Glover who had run the older Theatre Royal in Dunlop Street. The Baylis Trust sold their interest a decade later, and subsequent owners were Howard & Wyndham and Scottish Television.
