= Robert Henry Wyndham =

British actor-manager

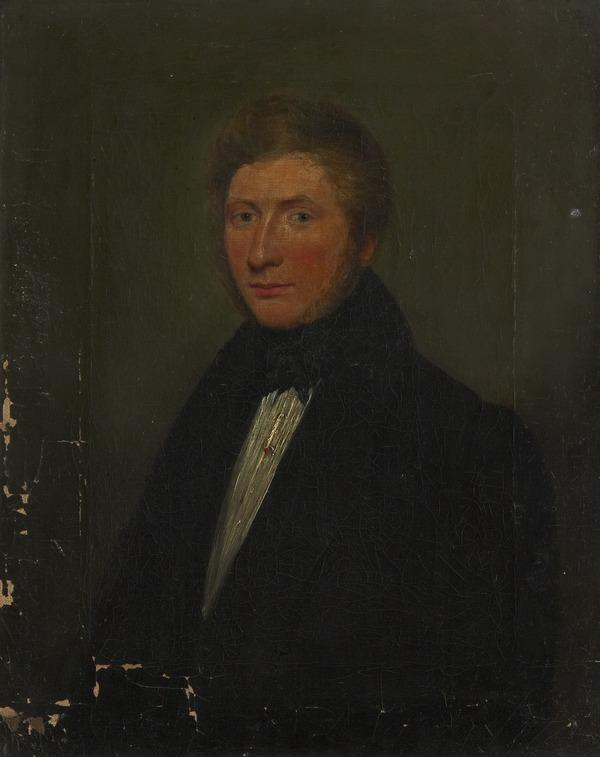
- Portrait by John Watson Gordon
- Born: 8 April 1814; Dublin, Ireland
- Died: 16 December 1894 (aged 80)
- Occupation: Actor

Robert Henry Wyndham (8 April 1814 – 16 December 1894) was an English actor-manager. From 1851 to 1875 he was actor-manager in Edinburgh, where notable plays of the day were performed and where Henry Irving's early career took place.

== Early career ==
Wyndham was born in Dublin in 1814. He made his first stage appearance in Salisbury in 1836, paying the theatre manager so he could play the long-studied role of Norval in Douglas. Six years later he played Romeo at Birmingham to the Juliet of Ellen Tree, and subsequently was seen at the Tuileries Garden before Louis Philippe I as Colonel Freelove in A Day after the Wedding.

During 1844 he appeared at the Adelphi, Glasgow, and next year he fulfilled his ambition of making a prominent debut at Edinburgh (filling the place vacated by Leigh Murray who moved to London): he appeared as Sir Thomas Clifford in The Hunchback by Sheridan Knowles to the Julia of Helen Faucit at the Theatre Royal, and made a favourable impression.

Among the parts allotted to him during the ensuing season were Mercutio, Charles Surface in The School for Scandal, and Rashleigh Osbaldistone in Rob Roy by William Henry Murray. In 1846 he married Rose, daughter of minor actor William Saker and sister of Edward Saker. She developed a special aptitude for training juvenile troupes in ballet and pantomime. In May 1849 Wyndham appeared at the Adelphi Theatre, Edinburgh, as Orlando, and in 1850 he was Brycefield in Marston's Strathmore.

== Manager of the Adelphi, Edinburgh ==
On 27 December 1851 Wyndham opened the Adelphi as actor-manager, in succession to William Henry Murray, with The School for Scandal, playing Charles Surface, and following the comedy up with Gulliver, arranged as a pantomime, for which Mrs. Wyndham trained the children.

The task of succeeding so successful a manager as Murray was an arduous one. Wyndham had to be leading comedian, acting manager, and stage manager in one; also a transition period was at hand which witnessed the increasing demand in Edinburgh for the theatrical "stars" of London, and the increased facilities afforded for touring companies by the railway.

For the first ten years of Wyndham's management, however, the old system that had prevailed under Murray was little affected. In February 1852 Wyndham produced Macbeth with scenery that was thought to surpass any yet seen upon the Edinburgh stage; in May he was seen as Claude Melnotte in The Lady of Lyons for his wife's benefit; in June he was Robert in Robert the Bruce; in August Rashleigh Osbaldistone; and in October, for his benefit, Henry, prince of Wales, in Henry IV.

== The Royal ==
The Adelphi was destroyed by fire on 24 May 1853. Fortunately for Wyndham, who was insured, but could not afford a holiday, the Royal Theatre was lying vacant. He promptly leased it, and opened on 11 June, in the part of Charles Bromley in Simpson & Co., which he followed up by Captain Absolute in The Rivals. The Adelphi, now renamed The Queen's, was reconstructed during 1854–5, and Wyndham for a time managed both theatres concurrently, but the Royal remained his headquarters until it was taken down in 1859. John Lawrence Toole was one of Wyndham's first stars at his new house, appearing at the Royal on 9 July 1853 in Dead Shot. Henry Irving, fresh from his debut at Sunderland, made his first appearance as a member of Wyndham's company on 9 Feb. 1857 as Gaston, duke of Orleans, in Richelieu.

Henry Irving remained with the Wyndhams as "juvenile lead" until September 1859. In November 1856 Wyndham was Rolando in Tobin's The Honey Moon; in May 1857 he revived Macbeth, with Mrs. Wyndham as Lady Macbeth and Irving as Banquo; in December of that year they were successful with the pantomime Little Bo Peep, with Irving as "Scruncher, captain of the Wolves". A final performance at the Royal, doomed to destruction in order to make way for a post-office, took place on 25 May 1859, when Wyndham played Sir Charles Pomander in Masks and Faces; Mrs. Wyndham played Peg, and Irving played Soaper.

== The Queen's ==
Wyndham now returned to the Queen's (the old Adelphi). He opened his first season there under royal letters patent on 25 June 1859, as Felix Featherley in Everybody's Friend. This was followed in July by The Heart of Midlothian, in which Montagu Williams and F. C. Burnand appeared as "distinguished amateurs"; and then London Assurance, with Williams as Charles Courtly, Irving as Dazzle, and Mrs. Wyndham as Lady Gay Spanker. In June 1860 Wyndham was Rory in Rory O'More, in June 1861 he played Myles in The Colleen Bawn, and in February 1862 Salem Scudder in The Octoroon.

The Queen's was burnt down on 13 January 1865 during the run of the Christmas pantomime, Little Tom Tucker. It was rebuilt and reopened as The Royal on 2 December 1865, in time for the next yearly pantomime, Robin Hood. A handsome presentation was made by the citizens of Edinburgh to Wyndham for his services to the drama in 1869. In 1871 he revived a number of Waverley dramas upon the occasion of the Scott centenary; but the star system was already in the ascendant, and this form of entertainment showed a diminished success. On 6 February 1875, during a run of Jack and the Beanstalk (in which A. W. Pinero was one of the performers), the Royal shared the fate of its predecessors, the Queen's and the Adelphi, the theatre upon this site being burned down for the third time under Wyndham's management.

Wyndham made his last appearance upon the Edinburgh stage on the opening night of the new Edinburgh Theatre, Castle Terrace, on 20 December 1875. As an actor, he was versatile, but is said to have excelled in light comedy and in Irish gentlemen. A year later he retired from his long and, upon the whole, successful management.

== Retirement ==
He left Edinburgh and settled in Sloane Street, London, where he renewed relations, under altered circumstances, with Henry Irving. He became a familiar figure at the Garrick Club, and is described as one of the youngest-looking men of his age. Wyndham died at his home aged 80, on 16 December 1894, and was buried in Brompton Cemetery on 20 December. By his wife he had two daughters and one son.

Frederick W. P. Wyndham (1853–1930), his son, began as an actor and later, with John B. Howard (1841–1895) managed several theatres; in 1895 they formed the theatre management company Howard & Wyndham Ltd.

== In fiction ==
Wyndham features as a character in Helen Graham's novel The Real Mackay: Walter Scott's favourite comedian (2024).
