= The Metropole Theatre =

Coordinates: 55°51′20″N 4°15′00″W

The Metropole Theatre started as the Scotia and was built in 1862 at 116, Stockwell Street, Glasgow, Scotland. Built to the designs of architect Robert Black for James Baylis, who later built the Theatre Royal in the Cowcaddens area of the city, it opened as the Scotia Hall, holding over 3000 people, with stalls and two galleries, reputed to be the first purpose built commercial music-hall in Scotland. Due to fire in 1875 it was rebuilt to the designs of architects Campbell Douglas and James Sellars and renamed The Scotia Variety Theatre, claiming to be the largest and best variety company in Scotland.

The Baylis family headed by Christina Baylis continued to run it until 1892, selling it on her retiral to Moss Empires who ran it until 1897 when they opened their new Empire Palace in Sauchiehall Street. At this point Edward Moss leased the theatre to HH Morrell and F Mouillot who named it The Metropole and presented plays, usually melodramas. Successive lessees included Arthur Jefferson who reintroduced variety. In 1926 it was sold to Bernard Frutin whose family continued to present variety, summer shows and winter shows for four decades, until fire destroyed the building on 28 October 1961.

Thereafter the Frutins bought the former Empress Theatre in St George's Cross in the West End of the city which in 1960 had been renamed The Falcon Theatre run by the Falcon Trust who staged plays and hoped to extend the building. The funding was not available for an extension and proposed performing Arts Centre and instead it was purchased by Alec Frutin in 1962 as a replacement for his former theatre in Stockwell Street. The St George's Cross building now opened as the New Metropole.

In 1964 Jimmy Logan, by agreement with Alec Frutin, bought the theatre, renaming it Jimmy Logan's Metropole. It prospered with variety, comedy plays, winter shows, and a Royal Variety Gala jointly with Scottish Television but found itself in an area which Glasgow Corporation was depopulating to peripheral housing schemes. The musical Hair opened in 1970 and ran for 10 months, its first outing outside London. Despite this success the theatre now drained money and closed in 1972. It lay derelict for many years before finally being demolished for a new housing development in 1990.

== Stan Laurel ==
When Arthur Jefferson took over the management of the Metropole in 1906 he employed his son Arthur Stanley Jefferson (then aged 15 or 16) to collect tickets at the box office. In 1917, Arthur Stanley changed his name to Stan Laurel, going on to become one half of the famous double act, Laurel and Hardy.
