= Master Betty =

British child actor (1791–1874)

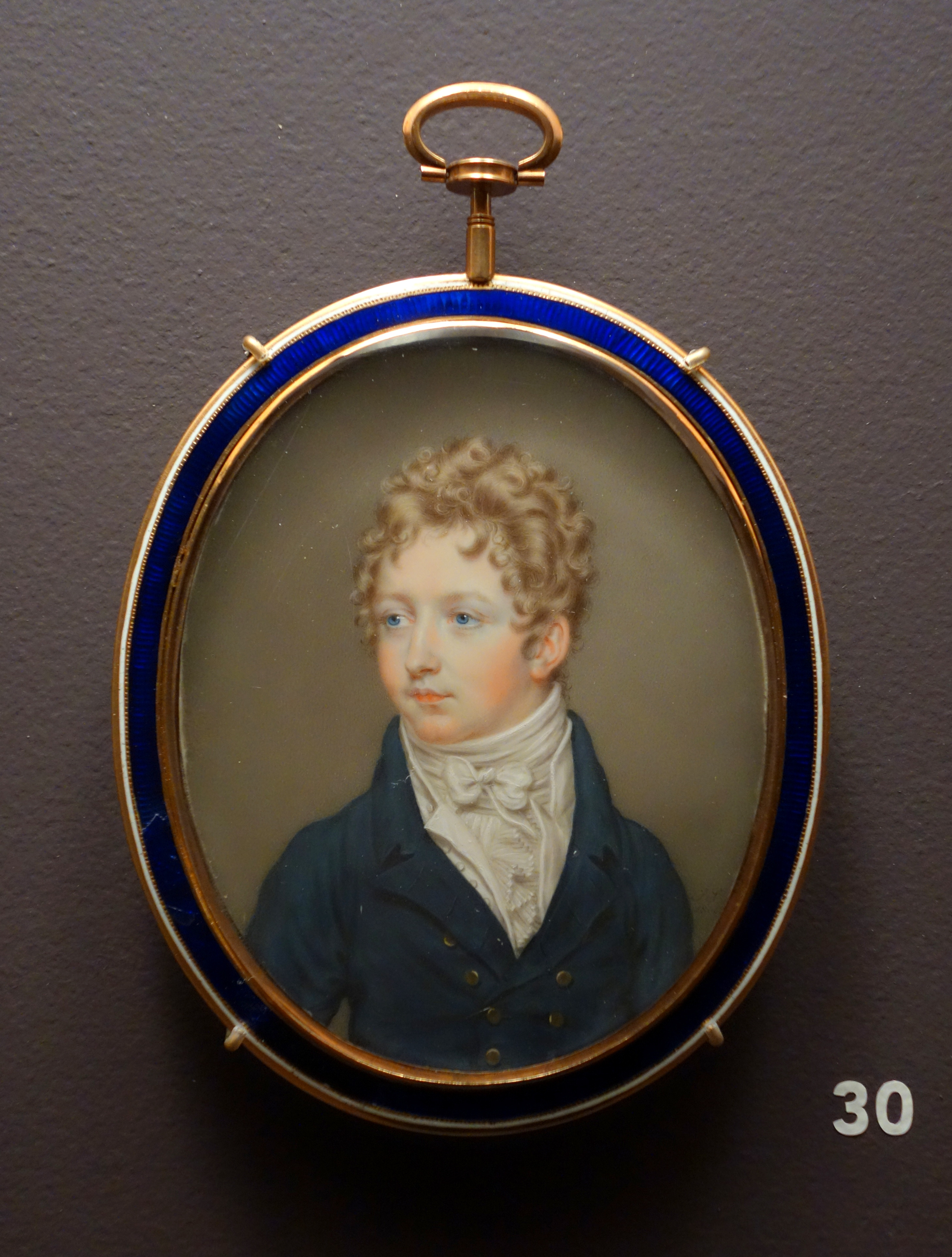
Miniature portrait of Master Betty; watercolour on ivory by John Smart (1806). Cincinnati Art Museum.

William Henry West Betty (13 September 1791 in Shrewsbury – 24 August 1874 in London) was a popular child actor of the early nineteenth century, known as "the Young Roscius."

== Family ==
William Henry West Betty was born on 13 September 1791 to William Henry Betty and Miss Stanton^{nee}. Betty was an only child and was christened in St Chad's Church in Shrewsbury. Both of William's parents were very wealthy due to inheritance. His mother inherited money from Shropshire, and his father William Henry Betty son of Dr Betty from the north of Ireland.

According to legend, Betty's father frivolously spent his money, which resulted in his losing a large portion of his inheritance. This loss might have contributed to the extreme exploitation of his child.

== Career ==
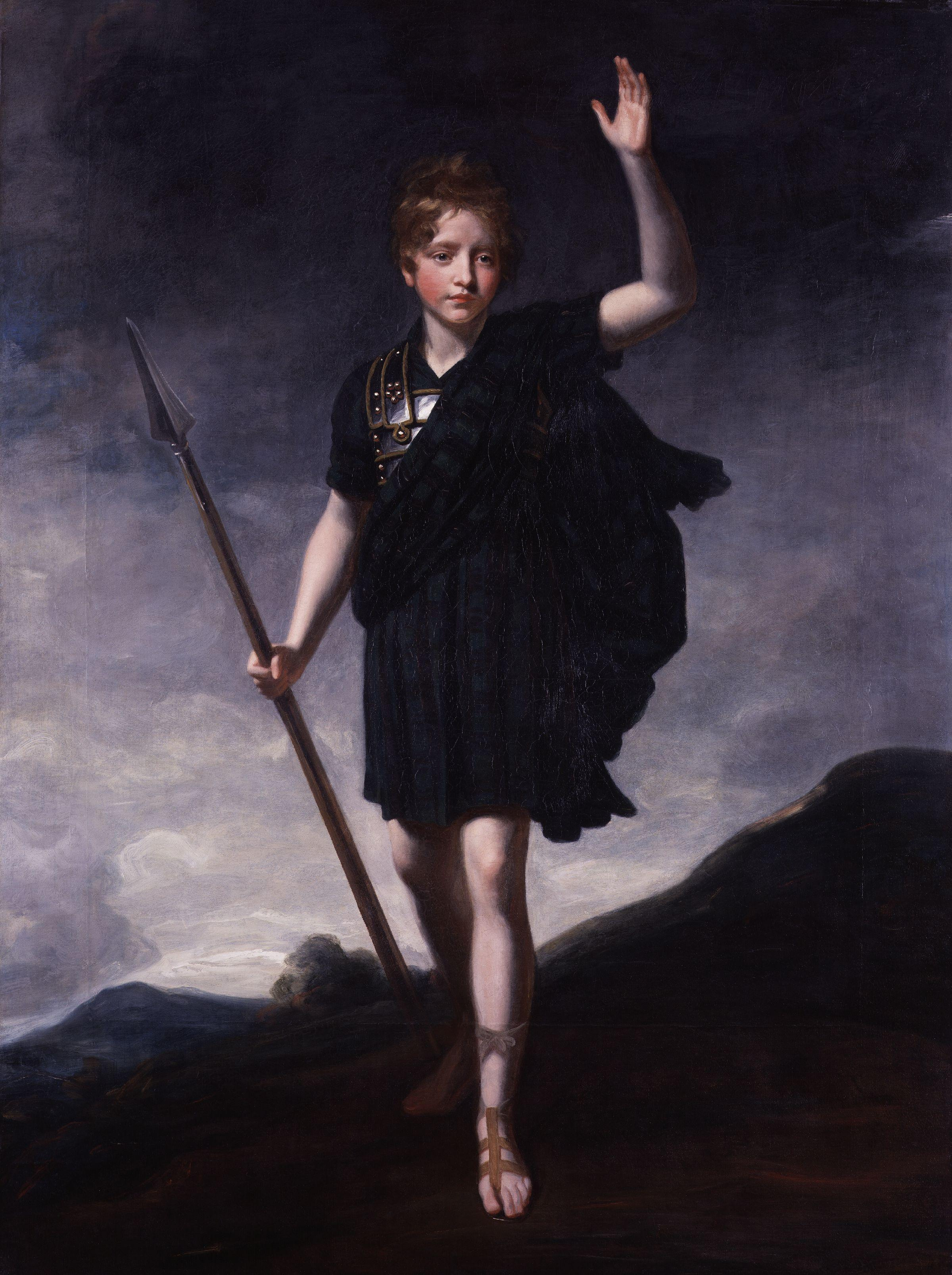
Master Betty as Young Norval by John Opie, 1804. National Portrait Gallery, London.

William Betty first showed his desire for the stage at the age of eleven when, in 1802, his father took the young boy to Belfast to watch Sheridan's Pizarro, starring Sarah Siddons in the role of Elvira. Her performance inspired him so much that William stated, "I shall certainly die if I may not be a player." Betty's father introduced William to Michael Atkins, manager of the Belfast Theatre. After meeting the child, Atkins said, "I never dared to indulge in the hope of seeing another Garrick, but I have seen an infant Garrick in Betty."

Not long after meeting Atkins, Betty was introduced to the theatrical prompter Thomas Hough, so he could direct, train, and mentor young William in the role of Osman in Voltaire's Zaire. While this was going on, there was an insurrection in Ireland which resulted in the closing of the Belfast theatre. Atkins knew he needed a huge attraction to bring in the crowds and he immediately thought of William. After some hard planning, it was settled, and on 11 August 1803, the eleven-year-old William Henry West Betty debuted professionally as the well-known Osman. His appearance brought in a large crowd, and reports stated that his performance was flawless and extremely well received.

He next took on the role of Young Norval in John Home's Douglas. This role fit him much better since he was actually playing a child and, once again, he astonished people in the theatre. News of Master Betty soon began spreading across Europe.

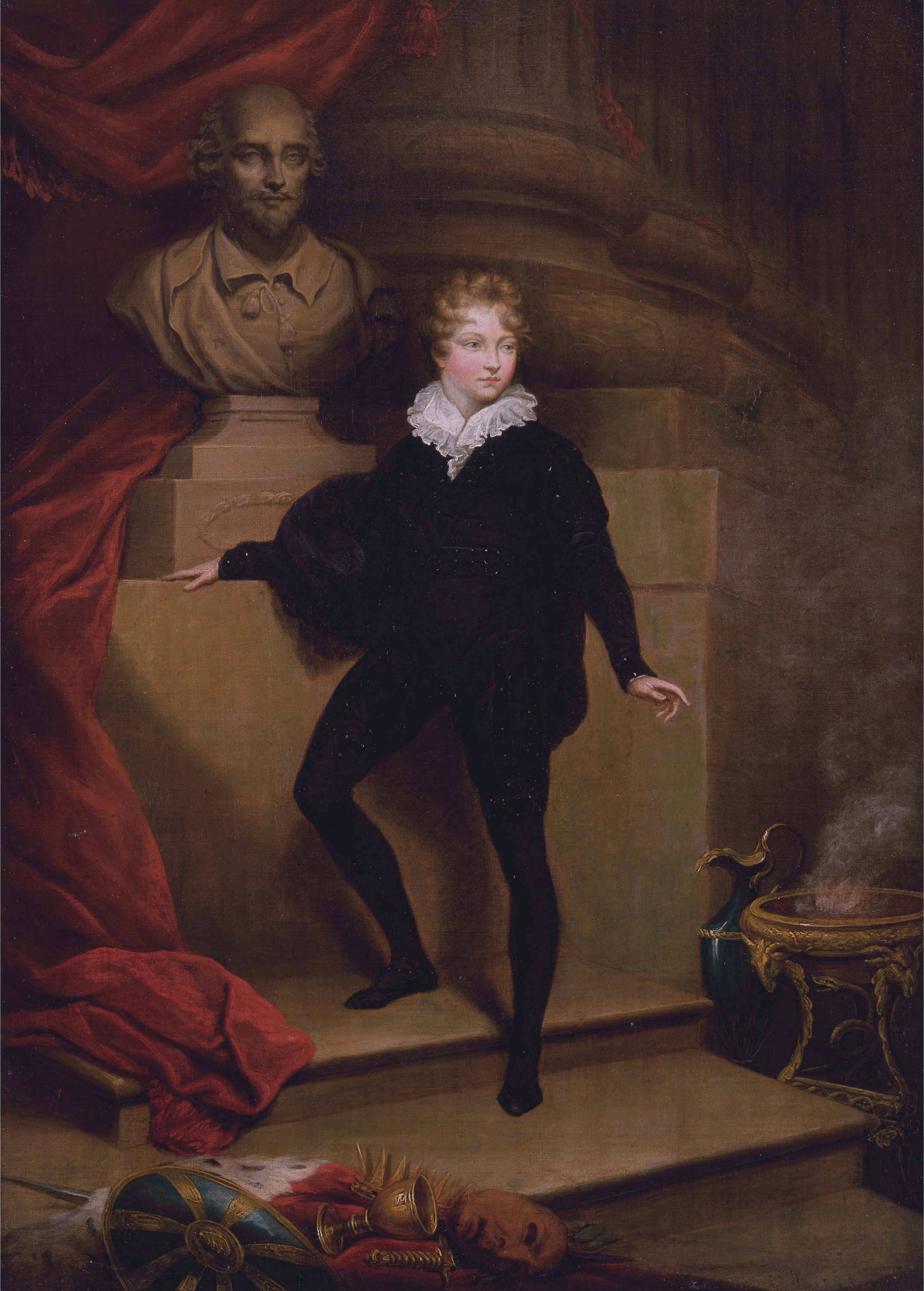
Master Betty as Hamlet (James Northcote, 1805)

Master Betty's fame extended beyond just Belfast to Dublin, where Betty's father talked to Frederick Edward Jones, manager of the Crow Street Theatre. They were able to reach an agreement for Betty to appear again in Home's Douglas at the Theatre Royal, where he debuted on 28 November 1803. There he also played Frederick in Elizabeth Inchbald's Lovers' Vows, the title role in Tancred, and in William Shakespeare's Hamlet. It was said that in three hours of study he committed the part of Hamlet to memory. The citizens of Dublin became so excited over Betty that the civil authorities extended the curfew an hour for those attending the theatre.

His parents then had Betty tour in Scotland and England in 1804, where he was treated with thunderous applause as he reprised past roles such as Young Norval in Douglas. His performances sold out and earned nearly 850 pounds the last six nights. Home, the author of Douglas, came to watch Betty and claimed that he "considered it the only performance where Young Norval was played according to his conception of the character." Having become the biggest sensation in Dublin and Belfast, Master Betty was ready for London.

On 1 December 1804, guards were hired to handle the anxious crowd at the doors of the Covent Garden Theatre waiting to get a glimpse of the child sensation. Some waited in line for hours. Constables stood inside the theatre, ready to stem any chaos. Once the doors were open, people flooded inside to find seats, creating a huge disorder. Clark Russell described the event:

Shrieks and screams of choking, trampled people were terrible. Fights for places grew; Constables were beaten back, the boxes were invaded. The heat was so fearful that men all but lifeless were lifted and dragged through the boxes into the lobbies which had windows.

Master Betty played Selim in Brown's Barbarossa or the Freedom of Algiers, an imitation of Voltaire's Mérope. The boy did not come on stage until half-way through the show, but he was still grandly received by his audience, including the prince of Wales. The second night, the patrons started a small riot, injuring many of the audience members and damaging the theatre. At Drury Lane, the house was similarly packed, and he played for the then unprecedented salary of over 75 guineas a night.

Betty was also a great success socially. George III himself presented Betty to the queen, and it is claimed - though unproven - that William Pitt upon one occasion adjourned the House of Commons that members might be in time for his performance.

== Retirement and attempted comebacks ==
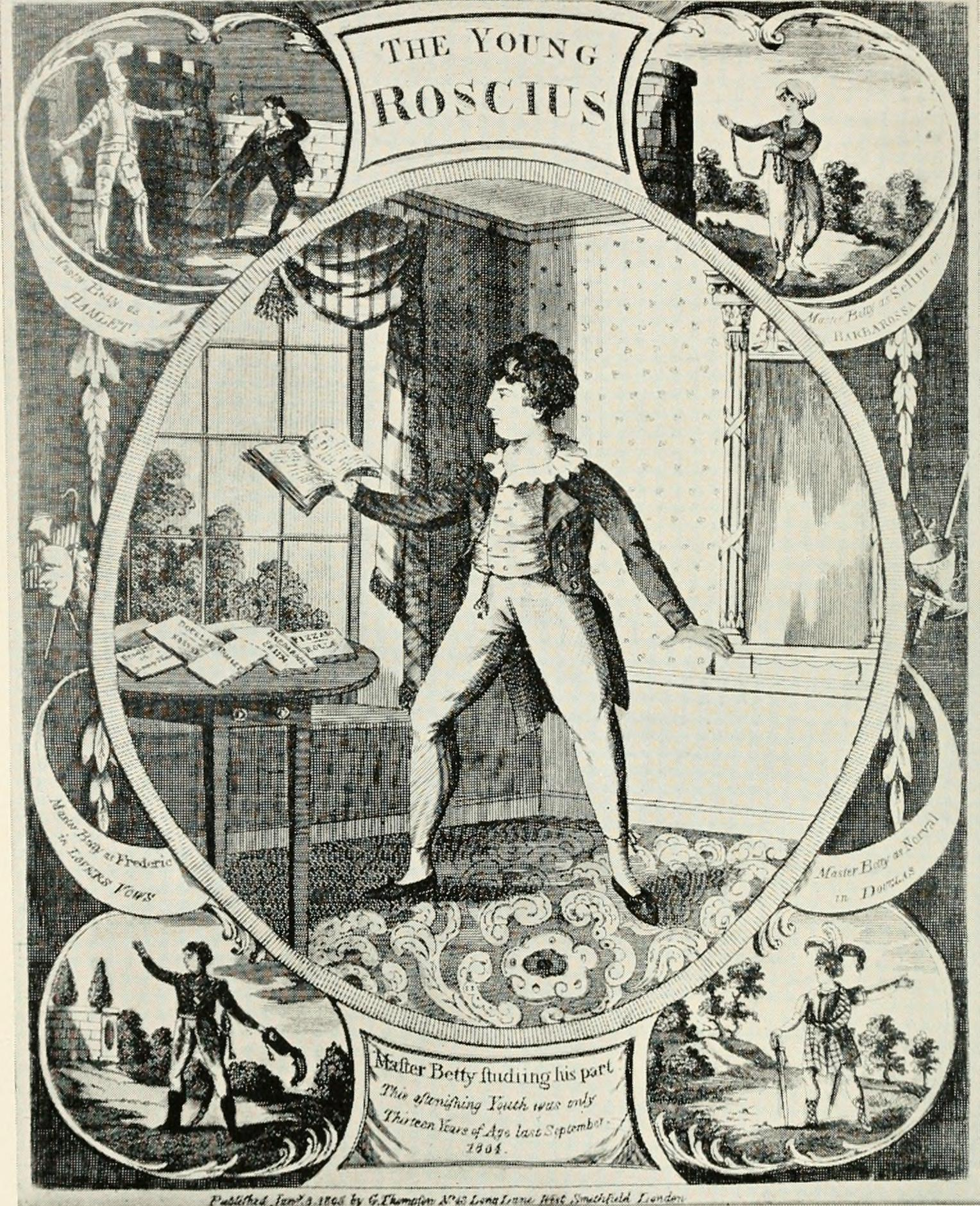
Some of the roles Betty (thirteen) had played

Betty remained a major attraction through the 1804 and 1805 London seasons: he appeared on the stages of the two patent theatres in alternation, although actors were generally contracted to one or the other. He made at least 45 appearances at Covent Garden and 50 at Drury Lane during those two seasons. But his novelty began to wane after this, and his father turned to provincial touring to eke out the child star's popularity.

An advert on 3 February 1807 of a tour of the provinces:

THEATRE, STAMFORD. Messrs. ROBERTSON and MANLY, most desirous of manifesting their respect for the town Stamford and its vicinity, have the satisfaction of announcing the appearance of The celebrated YOUNG ROSCIUS Three Nights during the Mart, 9th, 10th, & 11th March. They have gladly availed themselves on this occasion of presenting to the very liberal patrons of the Theatre this distinguished young Actor, whose extraordinary talents cannot fail of contributing highly to the pleasures of their season. N. B. The very great expense attending Master Betty's engagement compels the necessity of raising the prices of admission; Boxes, 5s. Pit, 3s. 6d.—Gallery, 2s.

Provincial theatres raising their ticket prices in order to cover the higher fees charged by well known actors on tour in the provinces did not go unnoticed or without comment.

The following hint has been given to Master BETTY'S Father, in a Provincial Journal, which we hope will not be given in vain. The Salopian Journal, after a liberal eulogium on Young BETTY'S acting, says "There is one character yet which will delight us all to him personate - that of Benefactor of the Salopian Infirmary; by performing on one night for that noble Institution." What a monument of fame might both Father and Son; easily raise if the latter were, in the Provincial Towns in which he performs, to appear one night in support of every neighbouring Institution for the relief of infirmity and distress.

The fees charged did not appear to have put off James Robertson (actor) as he offered additional appearances at their other theatres, however Master Betty declined as he was going to appear on a Northern tour. "Master BETTY's profits, for three nights performances at Boston Theatre amounted to £182. 18s. 6d. being half the takings. At Stamford he received the huge sum of £800 for five weeks. He declined accepting Robertson's proposals for Wisbech, Peterboro' &c. as he was immediately going into the North for the whole of the summer" reported the British Press on 30 March 1807.

Betty did however appear the next year on the Lincoln Circuit, first at Huntingdon between 20 and 25 May, then at Peterborough 27 May and 1 June, finally at the Georgian Wisbech Theatre (now the Angles Theatre), Isle of Ely on 3 June not long before he quit the stage in 1808 in order to attend Christ's College in Cambridge. After graduation, he lived with his family in the country, having become financially secure.

He was invited back to Covent Garden in 1812. He arrived in London on Monday 26 October, his first appearance was to be Achmet. The critics derided his performance, talking more about his former career as a child actor than his performance at the age of 21.

Betty never returned to perform in London again. Nine years later, he once again tried to mount a comeback and failed. He then tried to commit suicide, which also failed. He gave up acting in 1824. Hough, his former dramatic tutor from his youth did not survive to see him retire, dying in London in the summer of 1821.

== Life after the theatre ==
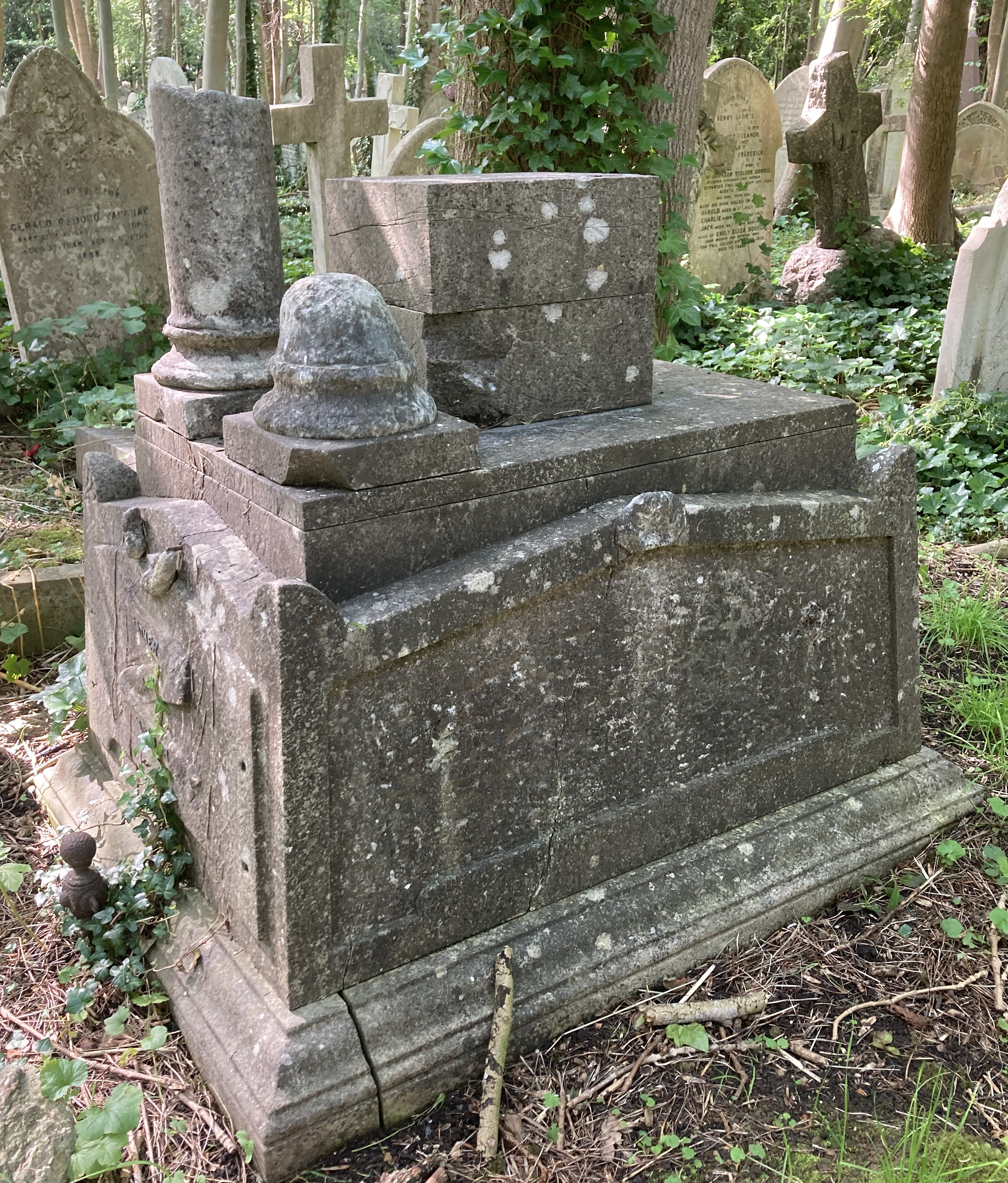
Family grave of Master Betty (William Betty) in Highgate Cemetery, north London

Betty devoted the remainder of his life to works and theatrical charities. His son, Henry Betty, also made a minor career as an actor appearing for instance at Spalding theatre for Fanny Robertson in October 1839. William Betty died on 24 August 1874 in Ampthill Square, London. He is buried with his wife and son on the east side of Highgate Cemetery with an unusual memorial of his own design, which now requires an effort of imagination to recreate its splendour from the pieces that remain.

The Actors' Benevolent Fund (ABF) still have a Betty Fund, though it is unclear whether this was endowed from Betty's will or by his son Henry after his father's death. It is likely that the ABF, founded eight years later in 1882, with Henry Betty on its first Council, grew from that endowment.

== Legacy ==
A review of Carl Miller's Play Master Betty was published in The Stage on 26 July 1990.

In 2022, The Young Pretender, a novel by Michael Arditti, set during Betty's abortive comeback in 1812, was published to critical acclaim.
