= Master Betty as Young Norval =

Painting by John Opie

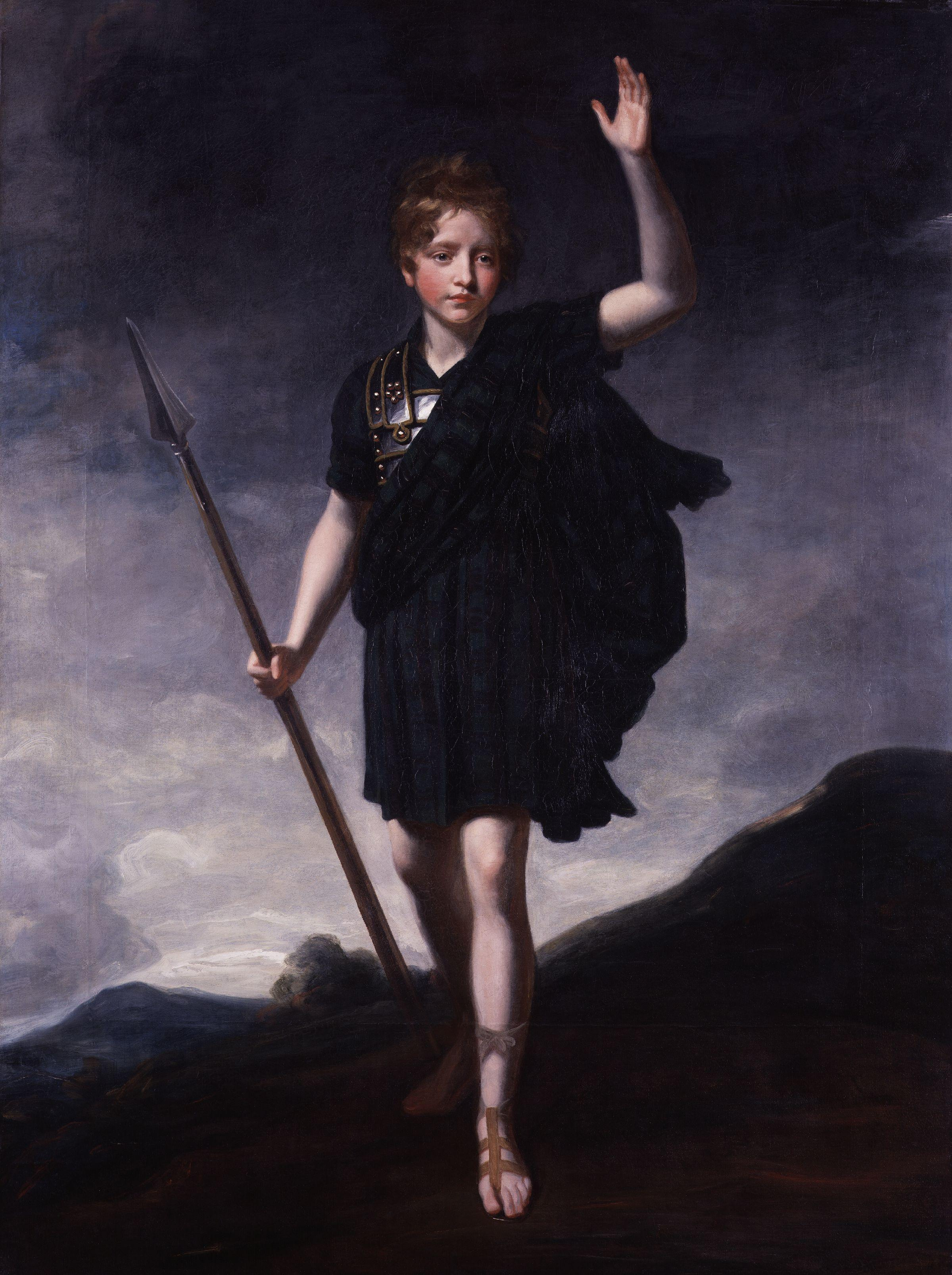
- Artist: John Opie
- Year: 1804
- Type: Oil on canvas, portrait painting
- Dimensions: 198.5 cm × 149.5 cm (78.1 in × 58.9 in)
- Location: National Portrait Gallery, London

Master Betty as Young Norval is an oil on canvas portrait painting by the British artist John Opie, from 1804. It features the child actor Master Betty, who had established himself as a major star on the West End stage of the early nineteenth century. He is shown in the role of Young Norval in the 1756 play Douglas, by the Scottish author John Home.

== History and description ==
The work was displayed at the Royal Academy Exhibition of 1805 at Somerset House, competing with a rival painting of Betty playing Hamlet by James Northcote and a bust by Anne Seymour Damer. Opie was a prominent British artist of the early Regency era, having burst onto the scene twenty years earlier as a young artist at the Royal Academy Exhibition of 1782, where he was hailed as the "Cornish Wonder". Today the painting is in the collection of the National Portrait Gallery in London, having been given in 1905 by the sitter's son.

== Bibliography ==
- Crane, David. Romantics & Revolutionaries: Regency Portraits from the National Portrait Gallery London. National Portrait Gallery, 2002.
- Martineau, Jane. Shakespeare in Art. Dulwich Picture Gallery, 2003.
