= Wanda Malecka =

Polish writer (1800–1860)

Wanda Malecka (1800 – 22 October 1860) was a Polish editor, translator, poet, novelist, printer, publisher and journalist. She was the first female in Poland to publish a newspaper.

Her husband was also a poet and an editor. In 1818–20, she was the editor of the handwritten paper Domownik. In 1822–23, she was the publisher of Bronisława, and in 1826–31 Wybór romansów. She also wrote articles for Wanda. She also translated from French and English. She wrote the poems "Wanda" about the legendary Princess Wanda, daughter of Krakus. She also wrote the novels Teraz dopiero kocham prawdziwie, Opuszona, and Fabiana.

== Sources ==
- Leon Rogalski, Historya literatury Polskiéj, Volume 2, Nakładem Michała Glücksberga, księgarza, 1871. pp. 590–591
