= Michael Atkins =

Irish stage actor and theatre manager

Michael Atkins (1747–1812) was an English-born Irish actor and theatre manager. He has been described as "the single most important person in the early history of theatre in Belfast.

He was the son of Michael Atkins, a singer who was in the Drury Lane company in the 1760s, while his uncle Charles Atkins was an actor active around the same time. Atkins appeared in London's West End in his youth, but primarily made his career in Ireland at the Belfast Theatre and its satellites at Newry, Derry, and Sligo. He was acting at the Smock Alley Theatre in Dublin from the early 1760s, and in the latter years of the decade was involved with James Parker's company in Belfast.

From 1773 he assembled a theatrical company at Belfast's Mill Gate Theatre. From 1778 to 1780 he was acting at the Crow Street Theatre in Dublin, before returning to the Mill Gate in 1781. Those who appeared in Belfast during the period included Andrew Cherry, William Macready. In 1783 Atkins oversaw the construction of a new, larger theatre in the city's Rosemary Lane and starred the rising actress Anne Brunton there. In 1791 he moved to another new venue in Arthur Street. After some financial difficulties in subsequent years, he returned to strength in the early 1800s. He headlined the actor Montague Talbot, and engaged Sarah Siddons play opposite him on fourteen nights in 1802. In August 1803 Atkins gave the child actor Master Betty his first professional appearance in Belfast, before he went on to stardom in London. In 1805, the year Siddons returned to appear in Belfast, Atkins recruited the young Edmund Kean.

The same year he retired from management after thirty two years and sold his rights in the company to Thomas Ludford Bellamy but continued to act. He died on 15 April 1812 in Ann Street in Belfast. He was married to a Belfast-born actress Catherine Hutton and had three children with her, all of whom had some involvement with the theatre, and his granddaughter married William Macready.

== Bibliography ==
- Highfill, Philip H, Burnim, Kalman A. & Langhans, Edward A. A Biographical Dictionary of Actors, Actresses, Musicians, Dancers, Managers, and Other Stage Personnel in London, 1660–1800: Abaco to Belfille. SIU Press, 1978.
- Johnston, Roy. The Musical Life of Nineteenth-Century Belfast. Routledge, 2017.
