= Archibald Maclaren =

Scottish playwright

- Born: 2 March 1755
- Died: 1826 (aged 70–71)
- Occupation: Playwright

Archibald Maclaren (2 March 1755 – 1826) was a Scottish soldier, actor and playwright. He wrote in Gaelic and English for bilingual audiences.

== Biography ==
Maclaren was born in the Highlands of Scotland on 2 March 1755, entered the army, and served in the American war under Generals Moore and Clinton. His regiment returned to Scotland to recruit, and in 1783 Mr. Jackson's company produced his farce of the Coup de Main at Edinburgh. On the conclusion of the war he was discharged, and joined Ward's itinerant troop of players at Montrose. He is said to have been a bad exponent of English parts, in consequence of his strong Scottish accent, but in Scottish, Irish, and French characters he was not unsuccessful.

In 1794 he enlisted as a sergeant in the Dumbartonshire Highlanders, and went with them to Guernsey, where he was engaged to act as prompter in the theatre, and where several of his pieces were performed. Thence his regiment proceeded to Ireland, and took part in the suppression of the rebellion. While in Ireland he wrote another farce, 'What News from Bantry Bay?' but it was not immediately produced, from fear of the United Irishmen. After the battle of Vinegar Hill he was discharged and went to London, where his dramatic writings afforded precarious support to his family till his death in 1826.

The following is a list of his works: I. Dramatic Pieces.—

- ‘The Conjuror, or the Scotsman in London,’ farce, Dundee, 1781.
- ‘Coup de Main, or the American Adventurers,’ musical entertainment, Perth, 1784.
- ‘Humours of Greenock Fair, or the Tailor made a Man,’ musical interlude, Paisley, 1789; ib. sine loco, 1790; both editions the same.
- ‘Highland Drover,’ interlude, Greenock, 1790.
- ‘What News from Bantry Bay?’ farce.
- ‘Bonny Lasses of Leith,’ supposed to be ‘Scottish Volunteers,’ with only a change of title, 1790 or 1800.
- ‘First Night's Lodging,’ farce.
- ‘American Slaves,’ comic opera, 1792.
- ‘Siege of Perth,’ interlude, Perth, 1792.
- ‘Siege of Berwick.’
- ‘Scottish Volunteers,’ musical farce, Paisley, 1795.
- ‘Old England for ever,’ Bristol, 1799.
- ‘Humours of the Times,’ comic opera, 1799; reprint of ‘What News from Bantry Bay?’
- ‘Negro Slaves,’ dramatic piece, one act, 1799, original of ‘Blackman and Blackbird,’ performed at the Amphitheatre, Westminster Bridge.
- ‘Negro Slaves, or Blackman and Blackbird,’ altered and enlarged.
- ‘Soldier's Widow, or the Happy Relief,’ musical entertainment, 1800.
- ‘Monopoliser outwitted,’ musical entertainment, 1800.
- ‘Chance of War, or the Villain reclaimed,’ musical drama, 1801.
- ‘Fashion, or the World as it goes,’ musical entertainment, 1802.
- ‘First of April, or the Fool's Errand,’ musical entertainment, 1802.
- ‘Lottery Chance, or the Drunkard reclaimed,’ musical drama, 1803.
- ‘Britons to Arms, or the Consul in England,’ musical drama, 1803.
- ‘Saw ye Bony coming?’ musical drama, 1804.
- ‘The Coronation,’ musical entertainment, 1804.
- ‘A Touch at the Times,’ two editions, 1805.
- ‘The Old Roscius, or the World of Novelty,’ burlesque interlude for cold weather, and ‘A Soldier and a Sailor,’ musical farce, 1805, reprint, with alterations, of ‘The Soldier's Widow.’
- ‘The Days we Live in: a Tale of 1805,’ dramatic piece, 1805.
- ‘Highland Drover,’ musical farce, with alterations and additions, 1805.
- ‘Dish of All Sorts,’ 1806.
- ‘Kenneth, King of Scots, or the Female Archers,’ a revised version of No. 18, 1807.
- ‘A Wife to be Sold,’ musical farce, and ‘The Slaves,’ dramatic piece, 1807.
- ‘British Carpenter, or the Irishman in France,’ musical entertainment, with alterations and additions, 1808.
- ‘How to grow Wise, or Folly exposed,’ dramatic piece, 1808.
- ‘Bessy Bell and Mary Gray, or Love in the Highlands,’ musical drama, with alterations and additions, 1808.
- ‘London out of Town, or the Family Geniuses,’ farce, 1809.
- ‘Private Theatre, or the Highland Funeral,’ musical drama, 1809.
- ‘Whimsicality, or Great News from France,’ musical farce, 1810.
- ‘Empress and no Empress, or Mr. Bony's Wedding,’ farce, 1810.
- ‘The Elopement, or a Caution to Young Ladies,’ dramatic piece, to which is added ‘The Duellists,’ 1811.
- ‘Spite and Malice, or a Laughable Accident,’ dramatic sketch, and ‘An humble Attempt to Convert the “Gentle Shepherd” into English Prose,’ 1811.
- ‘Paddy Bull, or a Cure for the Gout,’ dramatic piece, 1811.
- ‘Tricks of London,’ dramatic piece, 1811; reprinted 1812, under the title of ‘The Ways of London, or Honesty the best Policy.’
- ‘The Swindlers, or Diamond cut Diamond,’ dramatic piece, with ‘Coll and Rotha,’ a poem, 1812.
- ‘Irish Girl, or Cossack and no Cossack,’ dramatic piece, 1813.
- ‘Resource of War, or a most excellent Story,’ dramatic piece, 1813.
- ‘Good News! Good News!’ dramatic piece, and ‘Mr. Boney's Reception in Paris,’ 1814.
- ‘Forget and Forgive,’ dramatic piece, 1814.
- ‘Mr. Napie's Reception in Elba,’ 1814.
- ‘The Last Shift, or the Prisoners released,’ dramatic piece, 1814.
- ‘Retaliation, or an Hour and a Half in Paris,’ musical entertainment, 1815.
- ‘Man in the Moon, or Tumble down Nap,’ dramatic piece, 1815.
- ‘Highland Chiefs,’ musical drama (also under the title of ‘Maid of Lorn,’ musical drama), 1815.
- ‘The Deceiver,’ dramatic piece, 1816.
- ‘The Man Trap, or a Scene in Germany,’ dramatic piece, 1816.
- ‘Coup de Main, or Love and War in Yankyland,’ revised version of No. 2, 1816.
- ‘The Debating Club,’ dramatic piece, 1816.
- ‘Second Sight, or the Force of Superstition,’ dramatic piece, 1817.
- ‘Highland Robbers, or Such things were,’ dramatic piece, and ‘Health to the Rich and Work to the Poor,’ interlude, 1817.
- ‘Live and Hope; or the Emigrant prevented,’ musical entertainment, 1817.
- ‘Siege of Berwick,’ musical drama, 1818.
- ‘Oliver Cromwell, or the Scotch Regalia,’ dramatic piece, and ‘Imitation Tea, or Death in Disguise,’ 1818.
- ‘Battle of the Dandies, or the Half-way House,’ dramatic piece, 1818.
- ‘Wallace the Brave, or the Siege of Perth,’ dramatic piece, 1819.
- ‘Highland Wedding,’ interlude, and ‘Highland Funeral,’ farce, 1819.
- ‘Filial Duty, or the Maid of Oban,’ dramatic piece, 1819.
- ‘Masquerade, or Folly exposed,’ satirical interlude, with ‘Die or Dance’ and ‘Coll and Rotha,’ 1820.
- ‘Females Beware! or the Ingenious Footman,’ dramatic piece, 1820.
- ‘Isle of Mull, or the Lady on the Rock,’ dramatic piece, 1820.
- ‘Dead and not Dead,’ interlude, and ‘A Peep at the Coronation,’ dramatic piece, 1821.
- ‘Unfortunate Youth, or Bear the worst and hope for better,’ dramatic piece, 1821.
- ‘Juvenile Friendship, or Ancient Animosities,’ dramatic piece, 1822.
- ‘All the World's a Fair, or a Merry Day at Greenwich,’ a farce, 1822.
- ‘Royal Visit, or All alive in Auld Reekie,’ interlude, 1822.
- ‘New Marriage Act, or Look before you Leap,’ dramatic piece, 1822.
- ‘The Three Wishes, or a King's Frolic,’ farce, 1823.
- ‘Credulity, or the Force of Superstition,’ farce, and ‘A Chip of the Old Block, or the Pirates repulsed,’ interlude, 1823 (alteration of ‘Soldier's Widow’).
- ‘Runaway Bride, or the New Marriage Act repealed,’ farce, 1823.
- ‘Beautiful Insane, or the Rose of Morven,’ dramatic piece, 1824.
- ‘Arrogance brought down,’ interlude, 1824.
- ‘Music hath Charms, or Marrow Bones and Cleavers,’ comic interlude, 1824.
- ‘Ups and Downs of Life, or the Fortunate Irishman,’ 1824.
- ‘Affair of Honor, or the Dishonorable Affair,’ a dramatic burlesque (also under the title of ‘Follies of the Day, or a Tragi-comedy Duel’), 1825.
- ‘Eccentricity, or Every one has his Whim,’ farce, 1826.

Unless otherwise specified, the above were all published in London.

II. Prose.—‘A Minute Description of the Battles of Gorey, Arklow, and Vinegar Hill,’ 1798, 12mo, and ‘An Account of the Insurrection in Ireland,’ 1800.

III. Poetry.—

- ‘The Repository’ (songs and poems), 1811.
- ‘Coll and Rotha,’ a poem (published with the ‘Swindlers’), 1812.
- ‘Poetical Trifles,’ 1825.
