= Howard & Wyndham Ltd =

Howard & Wyndham Ltd was a theatre owning, production and management company named after John B. Howard and Frederick W. P. Wyndham, founded in Glasgow in 1895, and which became the largest of its type in Britain. The company continued well into the 20th century. Its theatres were eventually sold in the 1960s, and the shareholding came under American control.

== Founding of the company ==
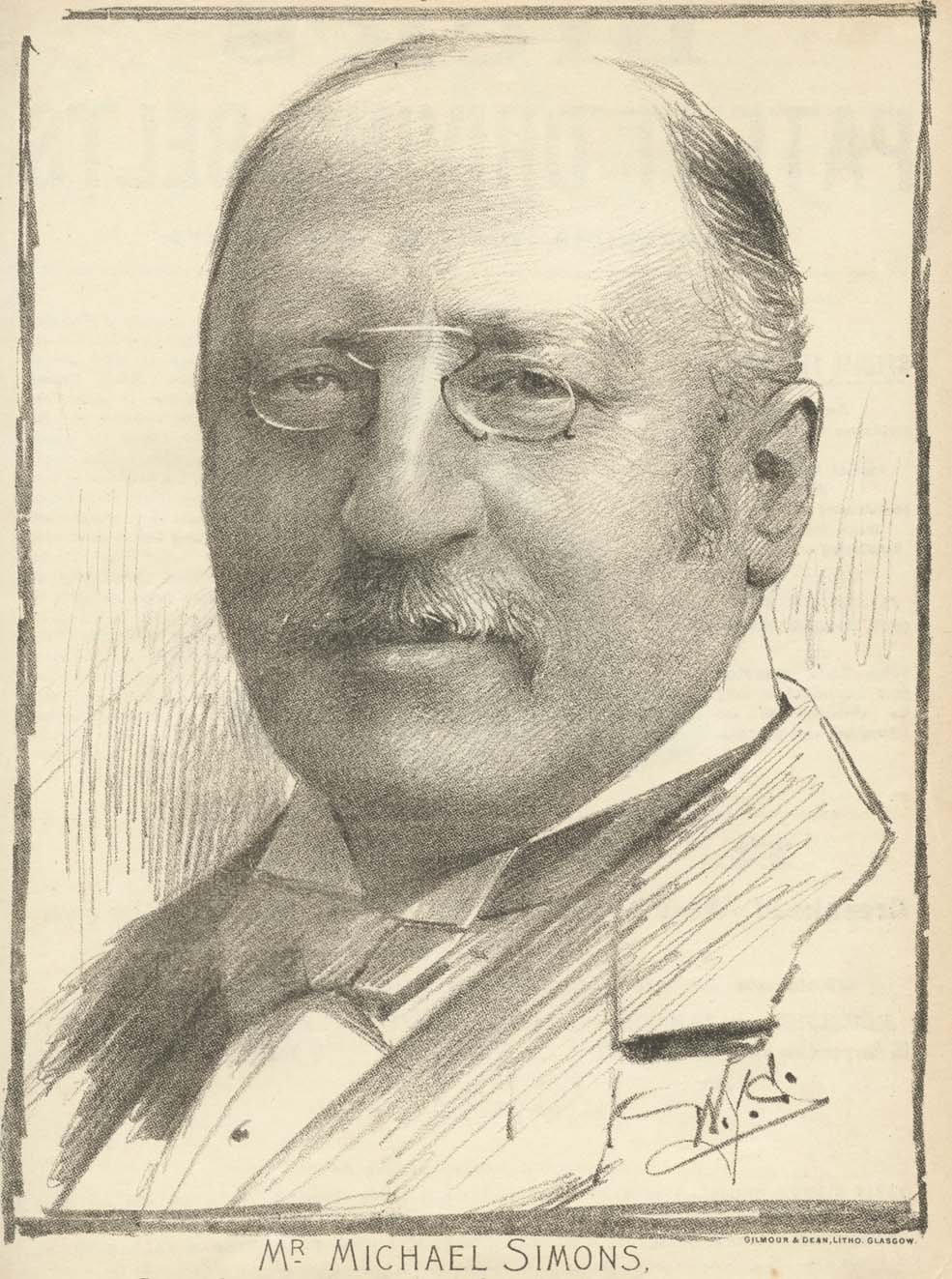
Michael Simons founder and chairman of Howard & Wyndham Ltd

Theatre Royal, Glasgow, auditorium under Howard & Wyndham Ltd

The company was founded in 1895 by Baillie Michael Simons of Glasgow to formalise and extend an 1883 partnership between Irish-born John B. Howard (1841–1895) and Edinburgh-born Frederick W. P. Wyndham (1853–1930), son of actor-manager Robert Henry Wyndham. The partnership was originally formed to run the Royal Lyceum Theatre, Edinburgh. Both Howard and Wyndham were well-known impresarios, actors and managers in Scotland and England. The new company owned the Theatre Royal, Glasgow with funding from Michael Simons, acquired the Theatre Royal, Edinburgh, and leased the Royalty Theatre, Glasgow. Howard died of a stroke only weeks after the company was formed. Howard & Wyndham presented drama, opera, pantomime, musicals and revues. From the 1930s, this included the famous Half Past Eight Shows which later became the record-breaking Five Past Eight Shows. They also tried film weeks in Glasgow and Edinburgh around 1911. They were not operators of music-halls nor presented variety, which was the forte of Moss Empires.

== 20th century ==
In 1904 the company built and opened the King's Theatre, Glasgow, and soon became Britain's largest company of quality theatres. Howard & Wyndham pantomimes graced British stages for over 90 years, possibly a record unequalled. Under Michael Simons, in 1912, the company took over the Robert Arthur group of six theatres (four in England - the Theatre Royal, Newcastle in Newcastle upon Tyne, the Royal Court in Liverpool, and the Royal Court in Nottingham - and two in Scotland), in Dundee where Her Majesty`s Theatre was Robert Arthur`s springboard for his theatre empire, and in Aberdeen.

Fred Wyndham continued to run the company productions until 1928, when he retired (though retaining his seat on the board for two more years). Howard & Wyndham Ltd bought over the King's Theatre, Edinburgh, appointing its A. Stewart Cruikshank as managing director of the group, and also making C. B. Cochran a director. Cruikshank instituted a resident company for a time at the Lyceum, and opened a contracts office for the group in London.

The company became based at the King's Theatre, Edinburgh, and its policy committed it to "the best work of modern writers, together with the classics of the past", including touring Shakespeare productions and opera alongside pantomime and musicals. Howard & Wyndham Ltd also held shares and directorships in Moss Empires, London West End theatres and were the major shareholders in H.M. Tennent & Company.

== Later years ==
On his father's death in 1949 in a road accident in Edinburgh, Stewart Cruikshank junior succeeded as managing director, and concentrated the offices and wardrobe in London while continuing the production facilities and stores in Edinburgh. Through its joint venture with Roy Thomson's Scottish Television at the Theatre Royal, Glasgow in the 1950s, the company became major shareholders in the new independent television franchise.

In the 1960s Howard & Wyndham Ltd sold its theatres in England and Scotland to the city councils, with one exception, their British flagship out of over 20 theatres, the Alhambra Theatre Glasgow which Glasgow Corporation declined to take up despite the public's preference for it. It closed in 1969 to meet company debts in film and television production.
