= De Monfort (play) =

1800 play

- Original language: English
- Written by: Joanna Baillie
- Genre: Tragedy
- Setting: A town in Germany

Premiere
- Date: 29 April 1800
- Place: Theatre Royal, Drury Lane, London

De Monfort is an 1800 Gothic tragedy by the Scottish writer Joanna Baillie. It was originally published in the author's Plays on the Passions in 1798. It premiered at the Theatre Royal, Drury Lane, then under the management of Richard Brinsley Sheridan, on 29 April 1800. The cast featured John Philip Kemble as De Montfort, Sarah Siddons as Jane De Montfort, Montague Talbot as Rezenvelt, William Barrymore as Count Freberg, John Powell as Manuel, William Dowton as Jerome, Thomas Caulfield as Grimbald and Elizabeth Heard as Countess Freberg. It was produced at the Theatre Royal, Edinburgh in February 1810, and revived at Drury Lane in 1821 with Edmund Kean in the title role.

== Bibliography ==
- Evans, Bertrand. Gothic Drama from Walpole to Shelley. University of California Press, 2022.
- Hogan, C.B (ed.) The London Stage, 1660–1800: Volume V. Southern Illinois University Press, 1968.
- Roy, David. Romantic and Revolutionary Theatre, 1789-1860. Cambridge University Press, 2003.
- Snodgrass, Mary Ellen. Encyclopedia of Gothic Literature.Infobase Publishing, 2014.
