= Theatre Royal, Edinburgh =

Former theatre in Edinburgh, Scotland

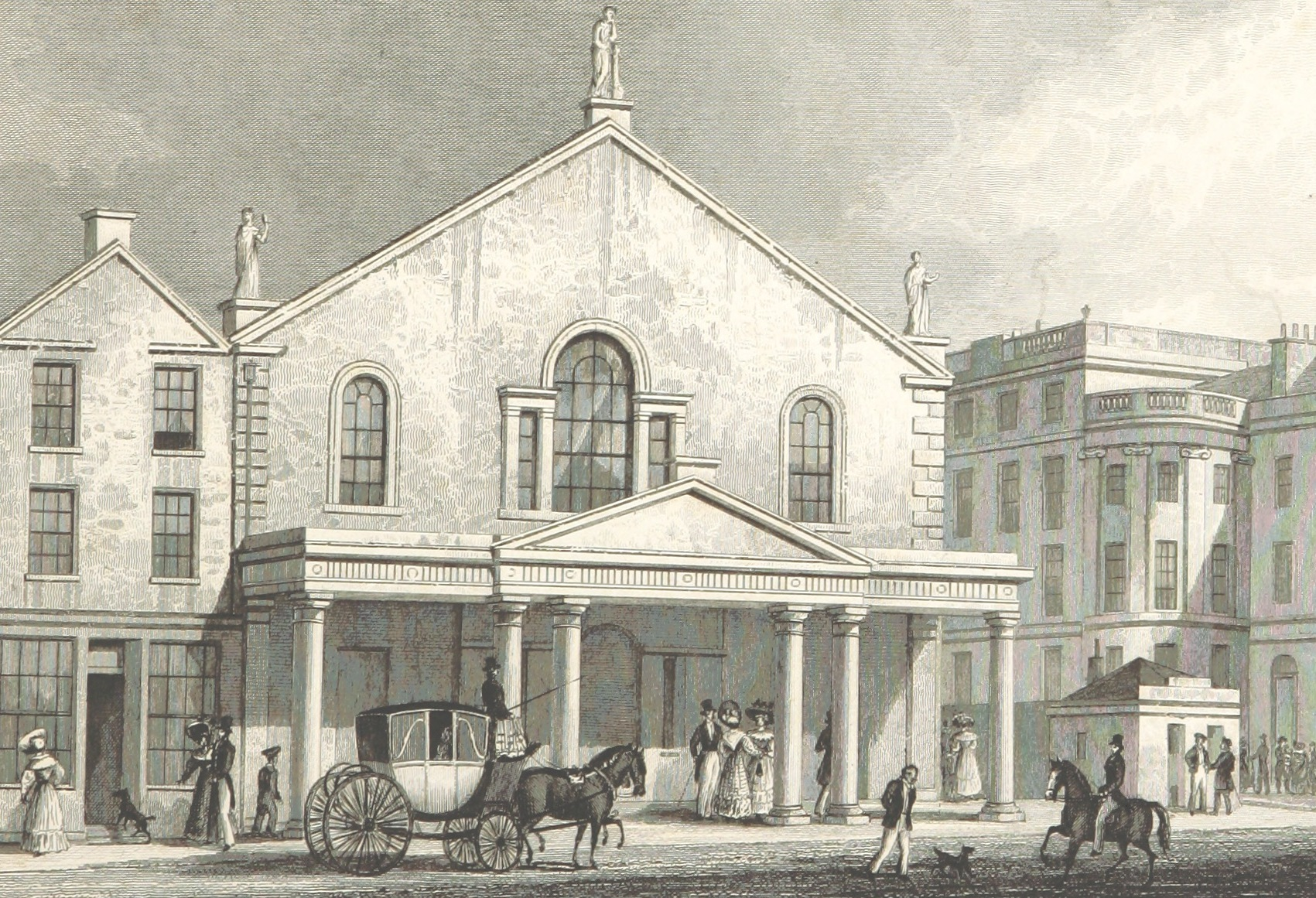
Original Theatre Royal on Princes Street, Edinburgh

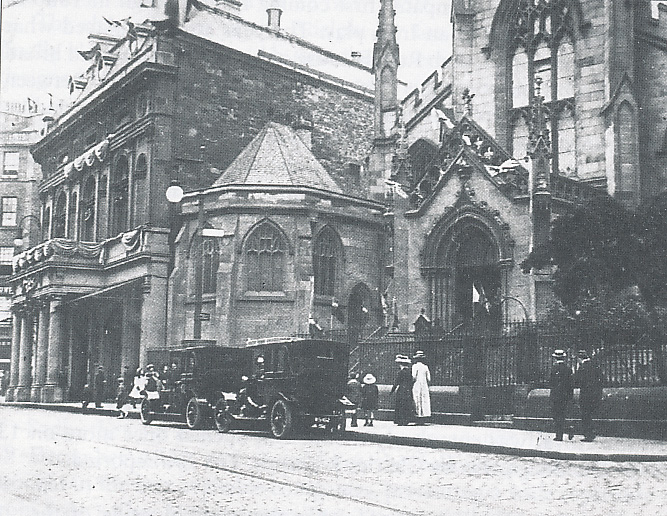
1911 postcard of the Theatre Royal, Broughton Street, Edinburgh

The history of the Theatre Royal, Edinburgh involves two sites. The first building, on Princes Street, opened 1769 and was rebuilt in 1830 by Thomas Hosmer Shepherd. The second site was on Broughton Street.

== History ==
The first Theatre Royal was in Shakespeare Square, at the east end of Princes Street. Following the granting of letters patent for the theatre by the Edinburgh (Improvements) Act 1766 (7 Geo. 3. c. 27), it was opened 9 December 1769 by actor-manager David Ross. Mary Bulkley performed here during the 1780s. In July 1792 Harriet Pye Esten became the theatre manager when she purchased the lease. The theatre had been run by Stephen Kemble but he lost the rights to perform which were withdrawn by Esten's lover Douglas Hamilton, 8th Duke of Hamilton. In 1794 Esten returned the rights to Stephen Kemble to perform in Edinburgh in exchange for £200 a year.

In 1809 the theatre was taken over by Sarah Siddons's actor son, Henry Siddons. It went into a period of decline under his control, but following his death in 1815 was revived by his wife, Harriet Siddons who took a 21-year lease from 1809 until 1830, then becoming outright owner and leasing to her brother William Henry Murray from 1830 until 1851.

The first theatre was closed in 1859 to make way for the building of the General Post Office (which survives but is converted to office use) whose foundation was laid by Prince Albert in October 1861.

The theatre was taken over by R. H. Wyndham around 1860. The royal patent and title was then transferred to the Queen's Theatre and Operetta House in a site in Broughton Street, on an earlier Circus (previously the Adelphi Theatre). The manager of the theatre was Robert Henry Wyndham. It burned down and was rebuilt in 1865, 1875, and 1884, each time retaining the patent. The last architect was Charles Phipps when in 1884 it was leased to Cecil Beryl of the Princess's Theatre, Glasgow. This Theatre Royal became part of Howard & Wyndham Ltd formed in Glasgow in 1895. From the 1920s Howard & Wyndham leased it out to Fred Collins, lessee of Glasgow's Pavilion Theatre, as the Theatre Royal Varieties, with the Collins family establishing its wardrobe and production centre adjacent. Horace Collins bought the theatre during the 1934-5 season. It was destroyed by fire in 1946 and not rebuilt due to post-war shortages of building materials.

== Notable productions ==
=== National dramas ===
In the mid-1790s, John Home's Douglas (1756) was produced at the theatre, with Henry Erskine Johnston in the role of Young Norval.

Walter Scott persuaded Henry Siddons to premiere Joanna Baillie's first Scottish-based drama, The Family Legend (1805), at the theatre on 29 January 1810. It played to packed houses for three weeks and was followed by Baillie's De Monfort (1800), which met with more success in Edinburgh than it had in London.

Edmund John Eyre's dramatic adaptation of Walter Scott's narrative poem The Lady of the Lake (1810) was staged at the Theatre Royal in 1811.

Rob Roy MacGregor; or, Auld Lang Syne, Isaac Pocock's adaptation of Scott's novel Rob Roy (1817), with music by John Davy and Henry Bishop, was first produced at the Theatre Royal in February 1819. The play was staged again on 27 August 1822 for the visit of George IV to Scotland.

The Heart of Mid-Lothian; or, The Lily of St. Leonards, William Henry Murray's five-act dramatisation of Scott's novel of 1819, was first performed at the Theatre Royal in February 1820, with scenery by Alexander Nasmyth and David Roberts.

James Ballantine's The Gaberlunzie, the dramatic adaptation of his novel The Gaberlunzie's Wallet, was staged at the theatre in June 1858.
