= Theatre Royal, Glasgow =

Theatre in Glasgow, Scotland

Coordinates: 55.8662°N 4.2562°W

Theatre Royal
- Royal Colosseum Theatre and Opera House
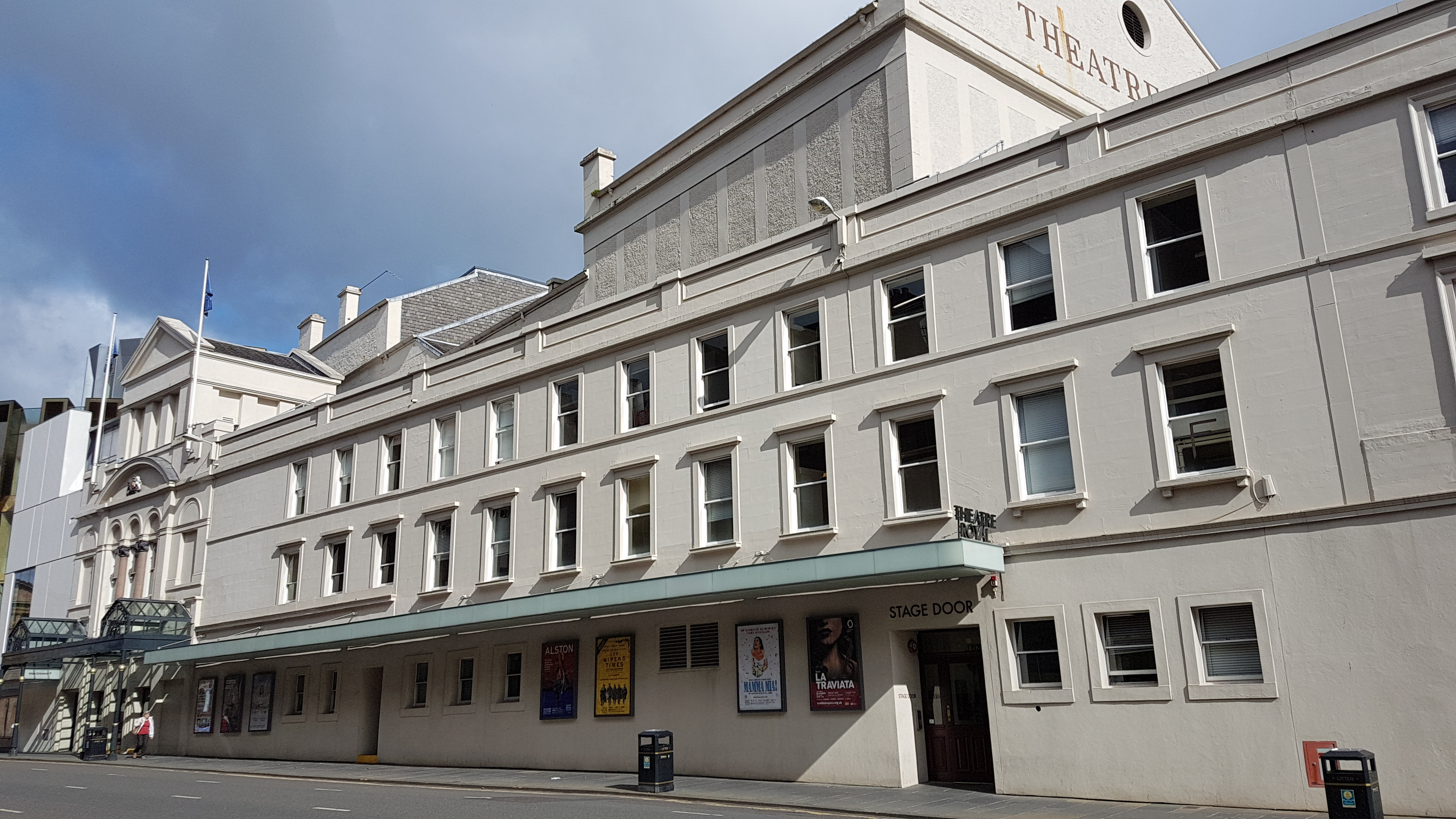
- Interactive map of Theatre Royal
- Address: 282 Hope Street; Glasgow; Scotland
- Owner: James Baylis (1867–1870); Baylis Trust (1870–1877); Margaret Anderson family (1877–1888); James Howard and Fred Wyndham (1888–1895); Howard & Wyndham Ltd (1895–1957); Scottish Television (1957–1974); Scottish Opera (1974–present)
- Capacity: 1,541
- Type: Proscenium

Construction
- Opened: 1867
- Renovated: 2014
- Rebuilt: 1879; 1895
- Architects: William Clarke and George Bell; Charles J. Phipps

Website
- Official Box Office

The Theatre Royal is the oldest theatre in Glasgow and the longest running in Scotland. Located at 282 Hope Street, at the Cowcaddens area, its front door was originally round the corner in Cowcaddens Street. It currently accommodates 1,541 people and is owned by Scottish Opera. The theatre opened in 1867, adopting the name Theatre Royal two years later. It is also the birthplace of Howard & Wyndham Ltd, owners and managers of theatres in Scotland and England until the 1970s, created by its chairman Baillie Michael Simons in 1895. It was Simons who as a cultural entrepreneur of his day also promoted the building of Kelvingrove Art Gallery and Museum and Glasgow's International Exhibitions of 1888 (the International Exhibition of Science, Art and Industry) and 1901; and the major extension and development of the McLellan Galleries just prior to WWI.

== History ==
Theatre Royal, Hope Street, Glasgow auditorium about 1930

The theatre was opened in 1867 as the Royal Colosseum and Opera House by James Baylis. Baylis also ran the Milton Colosseum Music Hall at Cowcaddens Cross, and had opened the Scotia Music Hall, later known as the Metropole, in Stockwell Street in 1862. The Royal, and its shops and adjoining Alexandra Music Hall, were designed by George Bell of Clarke & Bell, who became the founding President of the Glasgow Institute of Architects.

Baylis presented a range of performance activity in its auditorium: pantomimes, plays, comedies, harlequinades and opera. This early mention of opera seems significant given the theatre’s later role since 1975 as the home of Scottish Opera. Despite the financial importance of pantomime, then as now, opera in the time of Baylis was still viable as a commercial venture. The Mitchell Library`s archives record that other venues in Glasgow performed opera – in 1868 there were 76 performances of 23 different operas; and recent research increasingly underlines its presence down the years. Many operas, both famous and forgotten, had their Scottish premiere at the Theatre Royal. Certainly among surviving Scottish theatres, in this respect the Theatre Royal is head and shoulders above others even on the basis of a selective listing.

In 1869 Baylis leased the theatre to Glover & Francis who previously ran the old Theatre Royal in Dunlop Street, which had been demolished to make way for St Enoch railway station. William Glover brought the name Theatre Royal with him and its company of artistes, orchestra and stage staff, presenting drama, opera, revues and pantomime.

In 1879 the auditorium was destroyed by fire and was rebuilt to the classical French Renaissance design seen today of the renowned theatre architect Charles J. Phipps, creating three galleries instead of two and making the front door face Hope Street instead of Cowcaddens Road. It continued to accommodate about 3,000 people. It is now the largest surviving example of Charles Phipp's theatre work in Britain.

In the early 1880s a number of managers ran it until Baillie Michael Simons arranged for it to be made available to two actor managers, James Howard and Fred Wyndham, in 1888. They announced that in addition to plays, opera, musicals and summer revues it would be known above all as a pantomime house, their first being The Forty Thieves. The new company, Howard & Wyndham, went on to produce pantomimes across Britain for almost 80 years. Howard & Wyndham also presented from the 1930s onwards the famous Half Past Eight Shows which later became the record-breaking Five Past Eight Shows. They were not operators of music-halls nor presented variety, which was the forte of Moss Empires.

In 1895 the company became Howard & Wyndham Ltd, quoted on Stock Exchanges, and growing to own and operate the largest group of quality theatres in Scotland and England, with the Royal as its flagship. In the same year a fire destroyed the auditorium again, but was rebuilt six months later under the attention of Charles Phipps with few visible changes. Howard & Wyndham Ltd soon added to their stock of theatres by building the Frank Matcham designed King’s Theatre across the city centre in 1904.

In 1957, the theatre was sold to Scottish Television in a joint venture with Howard & Wyndham Ltd (who moved their own shows to their new flagship the Alhambra Theatre in Waterloo Street) for conversion of the Royal into a Scottish Television Theatre, studios and offices, becoming the main home for the commercial ITV network in central Scotland. Live performances in music, dance and comedy were transmitted across Scotland and networked to ITV areas south of the border. STV also transmitted concerts and operas from other venues and became the first and largest sponsors of Scottish Opera started by Sir Alexander Gibson in 1962

On the 3 November 1969, the theatre caught ablaze for a few hours and sadly took the life of a fireman who tried to extinguish the fire. As a result, STV carried most of its production onto its Edinburgh theatre branch, until a few weeks later where filming commenced again.

In 1974, Scottish Television moved to custom-built premises next door and offered the Theatre Royal to Scottish Opera who bought it with public support, converting it to become its home theatre and Scotland's first national opera house. A major rebuild and refurbishment ensued, involving the creation of an enlarged foyer, new main staircase, orchestra pit enlarged to accommodate 100 players, extended backstage areas and modernised dressing rooms. The auditorium was restored to its full glory and plasterwork once more in its original cream and gold and colour highlights, with the ornate ceiling picked out in its original colours of gold, cream and pale blue. William Morris wallpaper was added to the principal walls. It re-opened in October 1975 with a gala performance of Die Fledermaus, televised live.

The Duke of Edinburgh officially opened the refurbished Theatre Royal in October 1975, the Queen was not in attendance. The Duke spent the day on walkabout with the Opera House management and ARUP Associates engineers. He even took the time to speak with construction management, tradesmen and supervisors before opening the bars to toast the construction personnel on a job well done.

A few months later the Theatre Royal also became the home theatre of Scottish Ballet started in 1969, and became the main home of the Scottish Theatre Company during its existence in the 1980s. It became a principal venue of the city's Mayfest Festival each year, and continues to attract visiting companies. Since 1977 it has been protected as a category A listed building of architectural and historic importance. It is the largest example of Charles Phipps' architecture in Britain.

In 1997 a lottery-funded refurbishment allowed for extensive rewiring and redecoration. Cherry red walls, turquoise seating, and red and turquoise carpeting replaced the 1975 scheme. In 2005 Scottish Opera leased the theatre management to the Ambassador Theatre Group, although the building continues to be the performance home of Scottish Opera, and of Scottish Ballet.

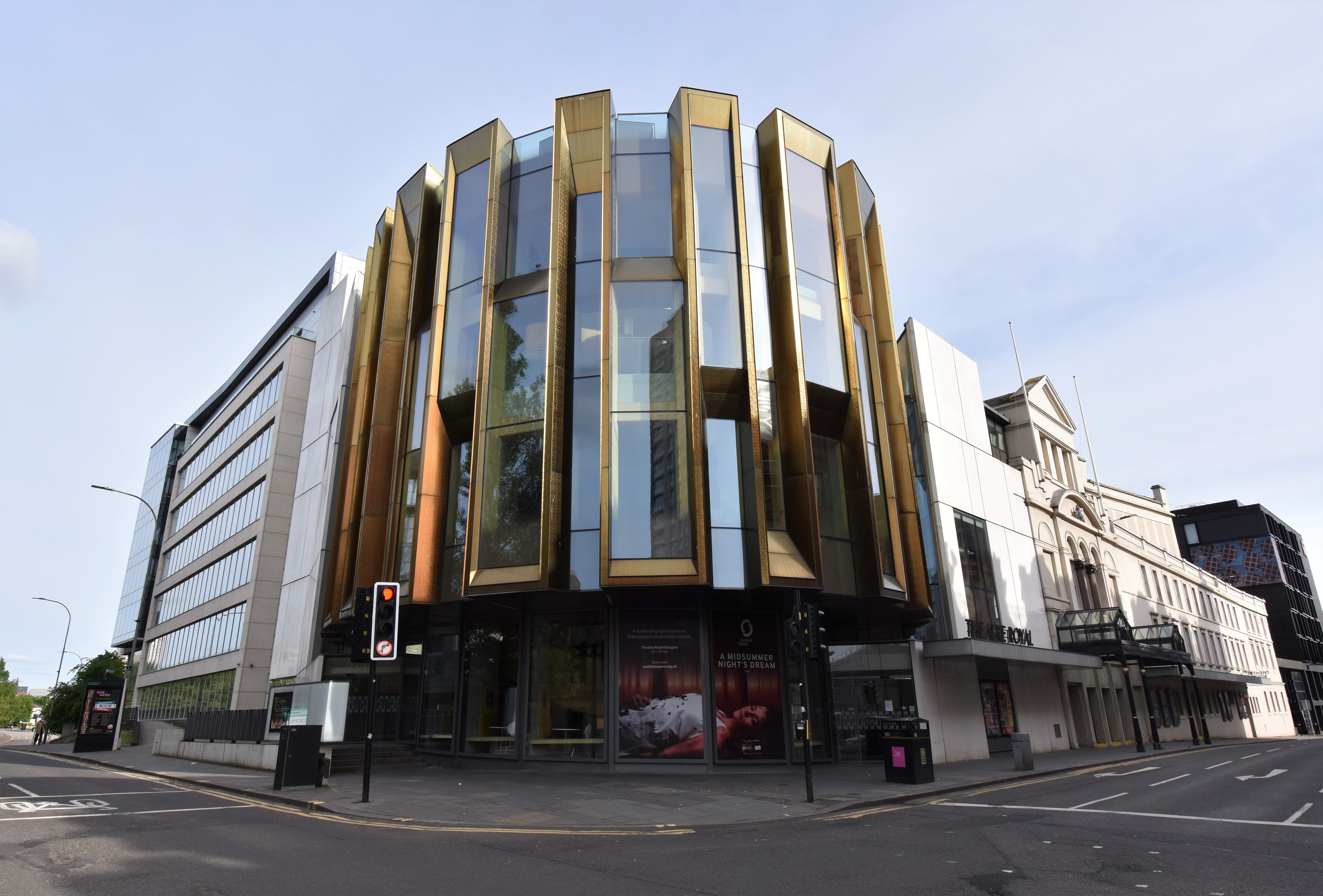
New foyer added in 2014

Funding from the Scottish Government, Heritage Lottery and others from 2012 onwards enabled Scottish Opera to build new foyers at the corner of Hope Street and Cowcaddens, partly on the site of the former Alexandra Music Hall. Costing £14M, it opened in December 2014 and is a largely elliptical building, containing new entrances, foyers, bars, cafe, hospitality areas, education space and heritage exhibition areas together with lifts to all levels, including an open roof terrace, and centred by an open spiral staircase.

When winning the design competition, the architects Page & Park observed:

One of the challenges of the design team has been to make a special and memorable corner at the junction of Hope Street and Cowcaddens Road. It will be as if a little bit of the splendid interior has escaped and flourished on the street edge, the auditorium and the lantern crowning the busy junction, working together to celebrate performance in the city. It will be a fun building to visit (and open all day); to climb through the levels will be exhilarating, guiding the visitor to the entrance to the auditoriums but at the same time framing the city around.

The theatre is home to Young Theatre Royal, classes for young people ages 3–18 run in partnership with Showworks Theatre.

== See also ==
- Culture in Glasgow
- List of Category A listed buildings in Glasgow
- List of theatres in Scotland
- List of opera houses
- Theatre Royal disaster (1849, Dunlop Street building)
