= Douglas (play) =

Blank verse tragedy by John Home

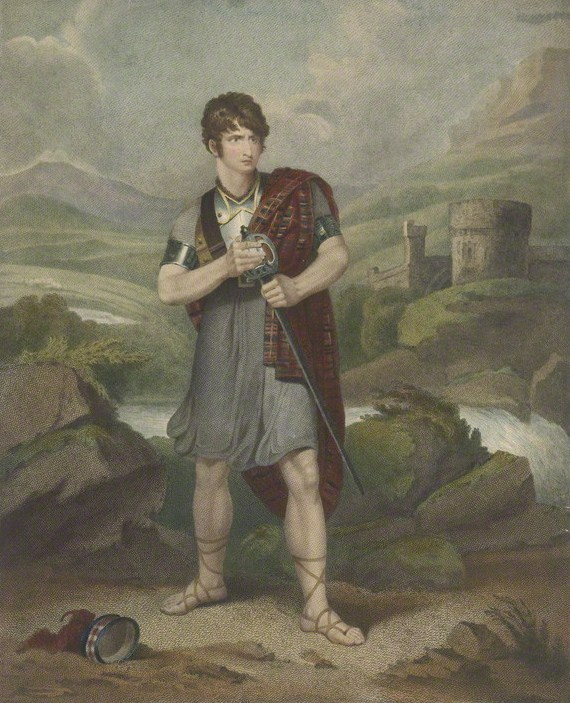
Portrait of Henry Erskine Johnston (1777–1830?), Scottish actor, in the title role of Douglas

Douglas is a verse drama tragedy written in iambic pentameter by John Home. It was first performed in 1756 in Edinburgh.

The play was a big success in both Scotland and England for decades, attracting many notable actors of the period, such as Edmund Kean, who made his debut in it. Peg Woffington played Lady Randolph, a part which found a later exponent in Sarah Siddons.

The opening lines of the second act are probably the best known:

My name is Norval; on the Grampian Hills
My father feeds his flocks; a frugal swain,
Whose constant cares were to increase his store.
And keep his only son, myself, at home.

— (Douglas, II, i)

== Plot ==
Lady Randolph opens the play mourning for her brother. Shortly thereafter, she discloses to her maid that she was married to the son of her father's enemy. She was not able to acknowledge the marriage or the son that she bore. She sent her maid away with her son to the maid's sister's house. They were lost in a storm and never heard from again.

Young Norval, the hero, is left outside shortly after birth to die of exposure. However, the baby is saved by a shepherd — Old Norval — and thus gains his name. He is in fact the son of Lady Randolph (daughter of Sir Malcolm), by Douglas, and he is briefly reunited with her.

Sir Malcolm exposes the child, but Young Norval is given a commission in the army.

When he saves the life of Lord Randolph, the lord becomes indebted to him, and Young Norval gains the envy of Glenalvon who is the lord's heir.

As was common in Romanticism, many of the main characters die, except for Lord Randolph. Lady Randolph takes her life, after hearing of the death of Young Norval who has been killed by Lord Randolph, who was deceived by Glenalvon. In turn, Young Norval had killed Glenalvon, because Glenalvon had been spreading lies about him.

== Theme and response ==
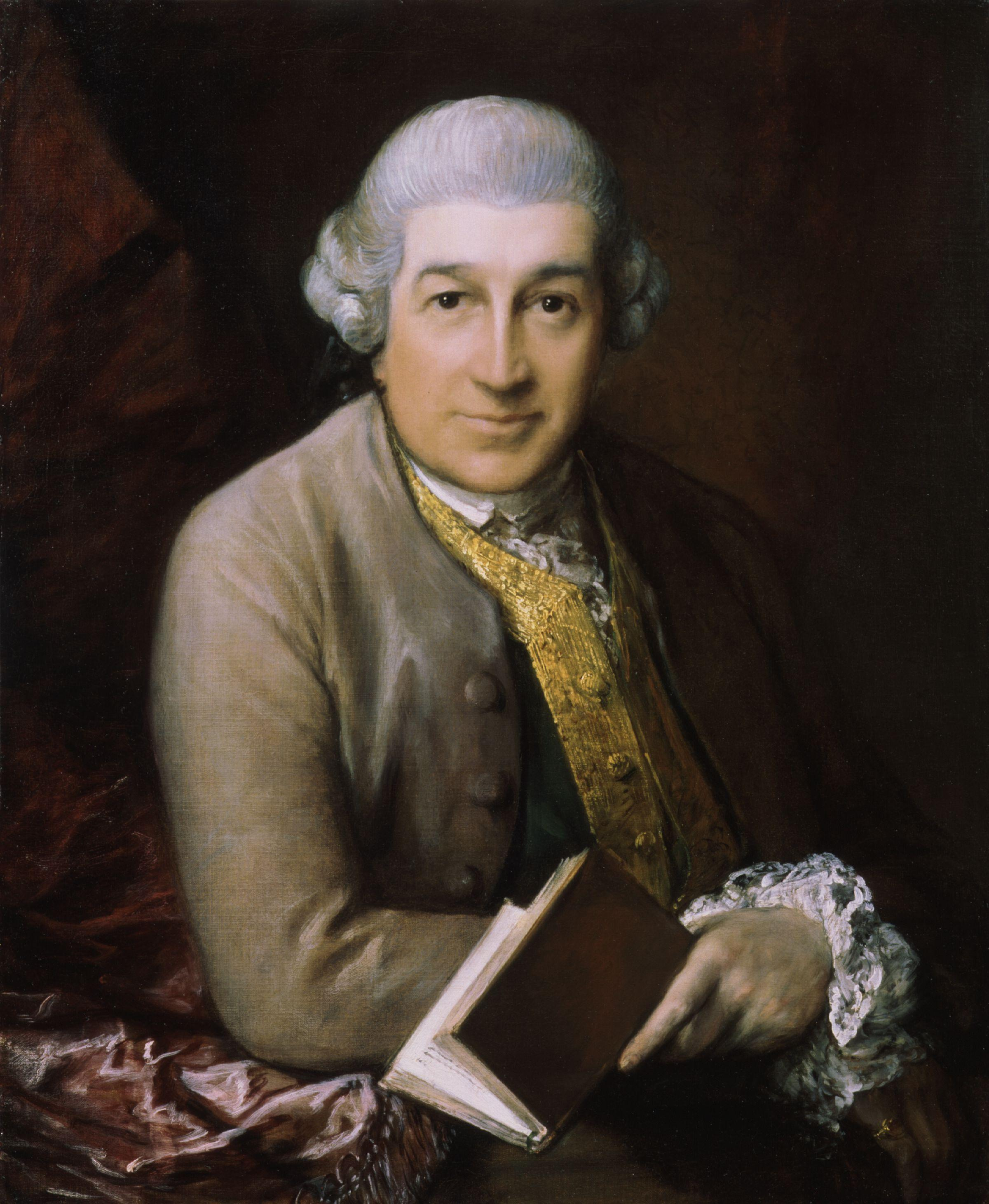
London-based actor and director, David Garrick, who initially rejected the play. A 1770 Portrait of Garrick by Thomas Gainsborough.

The theme was suggested to him by hearing a lady sing the ballad of "Gil Morrice" or "Child Maurice" (FJ Child, Popular Ballads, ii. 263). The ballad supplied him with the outline of a simple and striking plot. It was Home's second verse drama, after Agis.

After five years, he completed his play and took it to London for David Garrick's opinion. It was rejected, like Agis, but on his return to Edinburgh, his friends resolved that it should be produced there. It was performed on 14 December 1756 with overwhelming success, in spite of the opposition of the presbytery, who summoned Alexander Carlyle to answer for having attended its representation. Home wisely resigned his charge in 1757, after a visit to London, where Douglas was brought out at Covent Garden on 14 March.

David Hume summed up his admiration for Douglas by saying that his friend possessed "the true theatric genius of Shakespeare and Otway, refined from the unhappy barbarism of the one and licentiousness of the other." Gray, writing to Horace Walpole (August 1757), said that the author "seemed to have retrieved the true language of the stage, which has been lost for these hundred years," but Samuel Johnson held aloof from the general enthusiasm, and averred that there were not ten good lines in the whole play.

Douglas elicited the famous Edinburgh audience exclamation "Whaur's yer Wullie Shakespeare noo?," a remark meant to imply the superiority of the Scottish Home's superiority to the famous English playwright. The play was the subject of a number of pamphlets both supportive and antagonistic. It also arguably influenced James MacPherson's Ossian cycle.

Because Home was hounded by the church authorities for Douglas, he resigned from the Ministry in 1758, and became a layman. It may have been this persecution which drove Home to write for the London stage, in addition to Douglas' success there, and stopped him from founding the new Scottish national theatre that some had hoped he would.

== Later productions ==
In the mid-1790s, the play was staged at the Theatre Royal, Edinburgh, with Henry Erskine Johnston in the role of Young Norval.

== Literary references ==
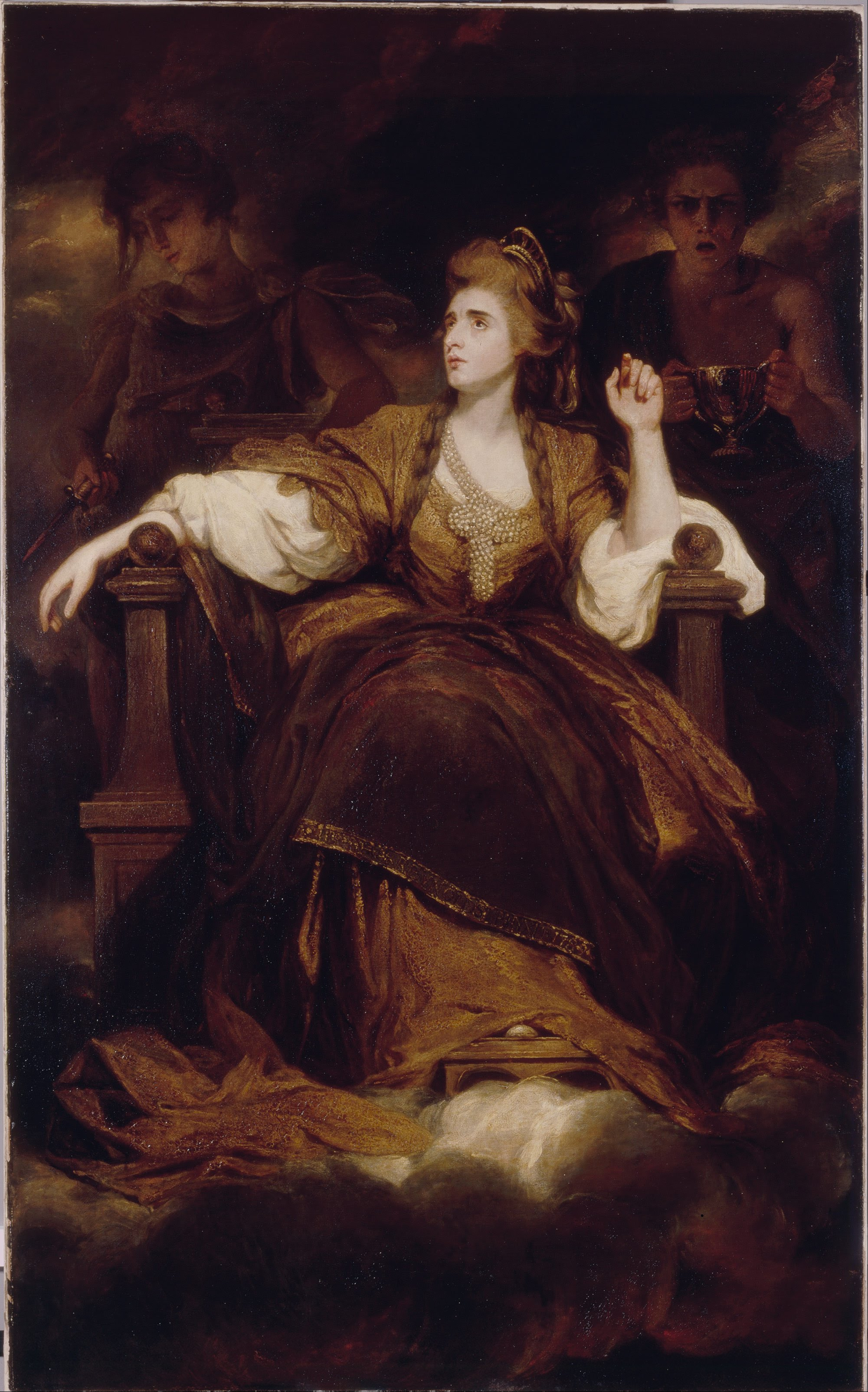
Sarah Siddons, one of the most noted performers of Lady Randolph in Douglas

Jane Austen's Mansfield Park (1814) and George Eliot's The Mill on the Floss (1860) both allude to the line "My name is Norval".

Young George Osborne recites it, eliciting tears from his aunt, in Thackeray's Vanity Fair (1847–48), p. 504.

Harry Walmers in Charles Dickens' The Boots at the Holly Tree Inn also refers to it:

Consequently, though he made quite a companion of the fine bright boy, and was delighted to see him so fond of reading his fairy-books, and was never tired of hearing him say my name is Norval, or hearing him sing his songs about Young May Moons is beaming love, and When he as adores thee has left but the name, and that; still he kept the command over the child, and the child was a child, and it's to be wished more of 'em was

There is also another reference to Norval in Nicholas Nickleby, when Wackford Squeers, while in custody, refers to his son as "a young Norval", supposedly the darling of the town.

Rev. George B. Cheever, American divine and abolitionist, references it in his 1857 broadside God Against Slavery. He recalls the recital by himself, when a boy, of the famous opening of the second act. Cheever then compares old Norval, who only sought to increase his flock and selfishly kept Douglas at home to do it, with those modern merchants who try to keep down anti-slavery agitation because it is bad for business (Cheever was well known in his time, and was listed by Edgar Allan Poe as one of the "Literati of New York City" in his famous 1846 series of articles of that name.)

Andrew Carnegie's autobiography describes reciting the part of Glenalvon as a youth. Part of the attraction was the opportunity to say "hell" without it being a swear word.

Hugh MacDiarmid, the twentieth century pioneer of the Scottish Renaissance, included the following lines in A Drunk Man Looks at the Thistle (1922):

My name is Norval. On the Grampian hills
It is forgotten, and deserves to be

Also referenced in George B. Shaw's play You Never Can Tell by the twins, Philip and Dolly.

== Adaptations ==
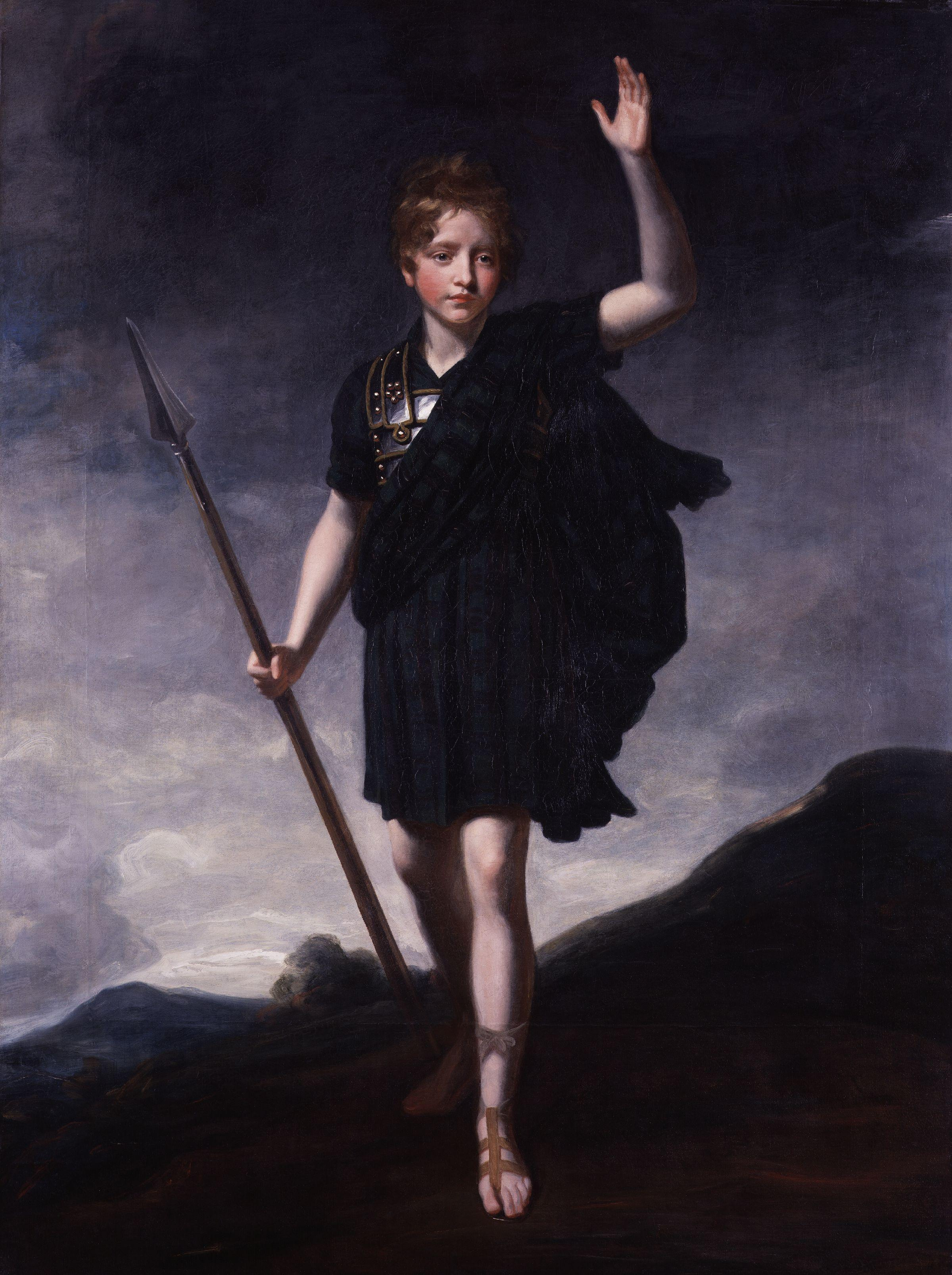
Master Betty as Young Norval by John Opie, 1804

In 1790, Lady Crespigny gave Douglas a happy ending in which Lady Randolph and Douglas live when it was played at her private theatre.

== Later productions ==
The play was produced at the Citizens Theatre, Glasgow under the direction of Robert David MacDonald in March 1989, with Angela Chadfield in the role of Lady Randolph.

== Contemporary drama ==
Brian Logan's Whaur's Yer Wullie Shakespeare Noo? was staged at Òran Mór in Glasgow, the Traverse Theatre in Edinburgh and the Lemon Tree in Aberdeen as part of the Autumn 2026 season of A Play, A Pie And A Pint.

== See also ==
- William Warren (actor, born 1767)
