= First Impressions (play) =

1813 play

- Original language: English
- Written by: Horatio Smith
- Genre: Comedy
- Setting: London, present day

Premiere
- Date: 30 October 1813
- Place: Theatre Royal, Drury Lane, London

First Impressions is an 1813 comedy play by the British writer Horatio Smith. It was first performed at the Theatre Royal, Drury Lane on 30 October 1813. The original cast included Joseph Munden as Sir Thomas Trapwell, Alexander Rae as Fortescue, Robert Elliston as Harcourt, William Lovegrove as Sir Toby Harbottle, William Oxberry as Sapling, Benjamin Wrench as Professor Trifleton, Julia Glover as Laetitia Freemantle, Elizabeth Rebecca Edwin as Lady Trapwell, Sarah Sparks as Lady Anemone, Frances Maria Kelly as Louisa and Susan Boyce as Phoebe. It lasted for fifteen performances on its original run. Its Irish premiere took place at the Crow Street Theatre in Dublin on 27 January 1814.

== Synopsis ==
Fortescue and Harcourt begin the play as friends, but have a falling out when Fortescue mistakenly believes he has spoken badly of him to Mrs Freemantle, a widow who he is in love with. Other quarrels break out amongst other characters, over misunderstandings, and its only in the fifth and final act that these mistaken "first impressions" are corrected.

== Bibliography ==
- Genest, John. Some Account of the English Stage: From the Restoration in 1660 to 1830, Volume 8. H.E. Carrington, 1832.
- Greene, John C. Theatre in Dublin, 1745-1820: A Calendar of Performances, Volume 6. Lexington Books, 2011.
- Nicoll, Allardyce. A History of Early Nineteenth Century Drama 1800-1850. Cambridge University Press, 1930.
