= Henry Twiselton Elliston =

English musical composer and inventor

- Born: c. 1801
- Died: 19 April 1864; Leamington,
- Occupations: Composer, Organist, Librarian

Henry Twiselton Elliston (c. 1801 – 1864), was an English musical composer and inventor.

== Life ==
Elliston was born in or about 1801, the second son of Robert William Elliston and the nephew of Mary Ann Rundall. He resided during most of his life at Leamington, where his father had formerly leased the theatre. Having decided on adopting music as his profession, he received a careful training, and became a sound theoretical musician, and an able performer on the organ and several other instruments. On his father presenting an organ to the parish church of Leamington, Elliston was elected organist, and held the post till his death. In the subsequent enlargement of the organ he exhibited considerable mechanical ingenuity, and invented a transposing piano on a new and simple plan. He was an early member of the choral society of Leamington, and whilst he was associated with it the society produced the Messiah and other great works during a three days' musical festival. Elliston himself built the music hall in Bath Street, with his brother William, who emigrated to Australia, he established the County Library. During the time that he and his brother were in partnership they gave concerts on an extensive scale. Subsequently, Elliston was lessee of the royal assembly rooms. Beyond some admired church services he composed little. In September 1863 he was appointed librarian of the free public library at Leamington. He died at Leamington on 19 April 1864, aged 63, and was buried in the cemetery.
