= Benjamin Wrench =

Actor

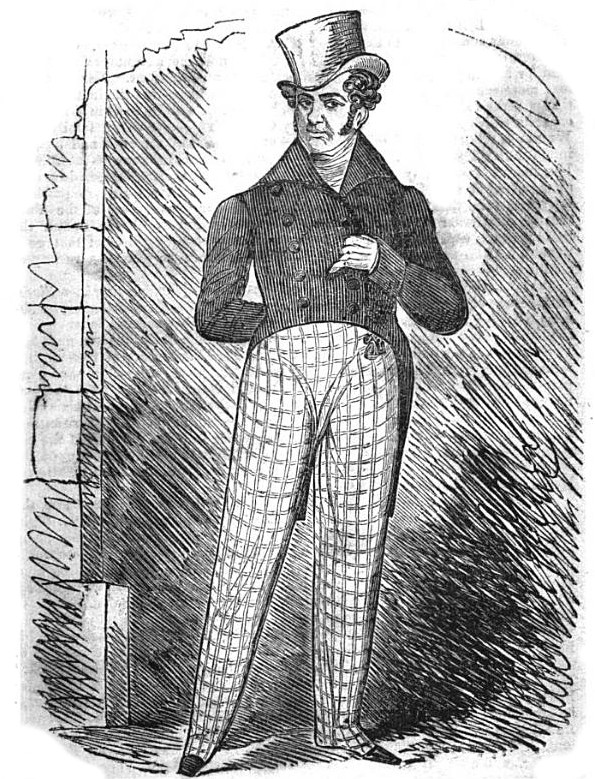
Benjamin Wrench, c.1838.

Benjamin Wrench (1778–1843), was an actor, born in 1778 in London, where his father occupied ‘a lucrative appointment in the Exchequer.’ He seems to have been grandson of Sir Benjamin Wrench, M.D., of Norwich (d. 1747, aged 82) (see Notes and Queries, 5th ser. v. 48). His father died before he reached his seventh year, and having declined a proffered living and a commission in the army offered by General Tryon, a relative, Wrench adopted the stage as a profession, making his first appearance at Stamford.

== Acting career ==
Whatever ability he had was slow in ripening, and he had to rehearse for fourteen days the part of Francis in The Stranger before he could be allowed to essay it. Mrs. Hannah Henrietta Robinson Taylor (c1757-1837) 21 years his senior, was the co-manager of the Stamford & Nottingham circuit, whom he married (as her third husband) on 9 August 1802 at All Saints' Church, Stamford, she coached him carefully and brought out such ability as he possessed. His eldest step-daughter Elizabeth Robinson had married another company actor and co-manager James Robertson on 6 October 1791 and another step-daughter, Mary Henrietta Robinson had married Thomas Manly (Wilson) on 8 August 1801. The theatrical partnership lasted just two and a half years, in March 1805 James Robertson announced that Mr Alcock had purchased Mrs Wrench's 'theatrical property'. Wrench and Hannah then joined in York the company of Tate Wilkinson, whose praise he obtained, and proceeded to Edinburgh, where with complete success he played Othello, Gossamer, Job Thornberry, and Jeremy Diddler. The marriage was a disaster and they later pursued separate careers. He had a drink problem and later left his wife in financial difficulties. She died in Melton Mowbray in 1837 aged 80.

When Robert William Elliston in 1804 quit Bath, he was replaced by Wrench, who made his appearance on 5 January 1805 as Gossamer in Laugh When You Can, and Walter in Children in the Wood. In the new Bath house Wrench opened on 26 October 1805 as Percy in the Castle Spectre. He played during the season Archer in Beaux Stratagem, Orlando, Belcour in The West Indian, and Pedro in The Pilgrim. He then returned to York, and while there received an offer from Drury Lane, where he appeared, with the company then temporarily occupying the Lyceum, as ‘Wrench from Bath and York,’ playing on 7 October 1809 Belcour in The West Indian and Tristram Fickle in The Weathercock.

At Drury Lane Wrench remained until 1815. He left Drury Lane that year, and divided his time between the Lyceum and the country — Birmingham, Bristol, Dublin, and other large towns. At the Lyceum he was on 29 Aug. 1818 the first Wing in Peake's Amateurs and Actors, the first Jenkins in Gretna Green, and the first Sir John Freeman in Free and Easy. In 1820, as Captain Somerville in Capers at Canterbury, he made his first appearance at the Adelphi, where he made perhaps his greatest success on 26 November 1821 as Corinthian Tom in Moncrieff's Tom and Jerry, or Life in London.

On 4 October 1826 Wrench appeared for the first time at Covent Garden, enacting Rover in Wild Oats. He had made a great success at the Lyceum in He lies like Truth, and was at that house when (16 Feb. 1830) it was burnt to the ground. In 1834, in the rebuilt house, Wrench and Keeley made a great hit in Oxenford's I and my Double. On 30 Oct. at the Haymarket he was the first Caleb Chizzler in But however by Henry Mayhew and Henry Baylis. In 1840 Wrench was at the Olympic. His last engagement was at the Haymarket.

In the country Wrench played a large round of comic characters, including Charles Surface, Dr. Pangloss, Captain Absolute, and many others. Wrench was a good comedian, but never reached the first rank. Oxberry, who often played with him, speaks of him as knock-kneed, and says that, adopting Robert William Elliston as model, he copied his nasal twang and drawling doubtful delivery, mistook abruptness for humour, and was less a gentleman on the stage than a "blood" (rake).

== Personal life ==
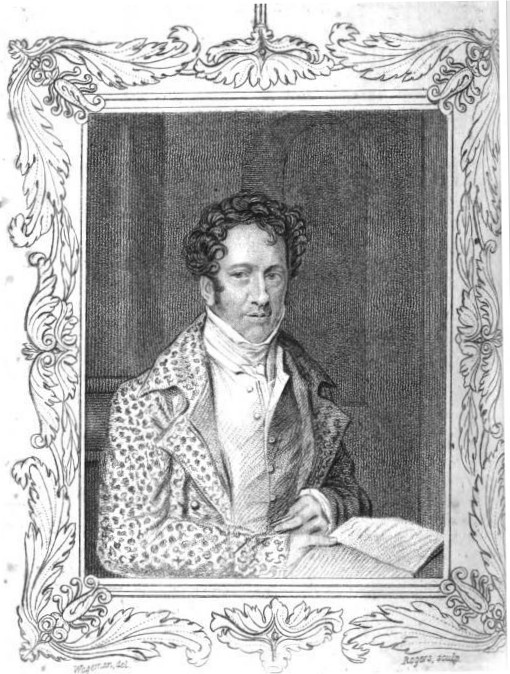
Benjamin Wrench as Belmour c.1826

On 24 Oct. 1843 he died at his lodgings in Pickett Place, London, in his sixty-sixth year. Wrench and Manly, an actor, were engaged respectively to Miss Robinson and Mrs. Taylor of Nottingham, but ultimately changed partners, Wrench marrying Mrs. Taylor and Manly her daughter. Wrench's marriage was not happy. He was charged with leaving his wife necessitous while he indulged in tavern dissipations. His wife had formerly, as Mrs. Taylor, been an actress of some ability (see Thespian Dictionary, under Taylor [Mrs. Robinson]).

Wrench was medium height, light complexioned, with high shoulders and flat features. A portrait of him, by Sharpe, as Wing in ‘Amateurs and Actors,’ and one by De Wilde as Sir Freeman in ‘Free and Easy,’ are in the Mathews collection in the Garrick. His portrait as Belmour is in Oxberry's ‘Dramatic Biography,’ and as Benedick in the ‘Theatrical Inquisitor’ for January 1814. An image from 'Fashion in Success' is also in the book on the Lincolnshire Circuit by Neil R Wright.
