= Alexander Rae (actor) =

British stage actor

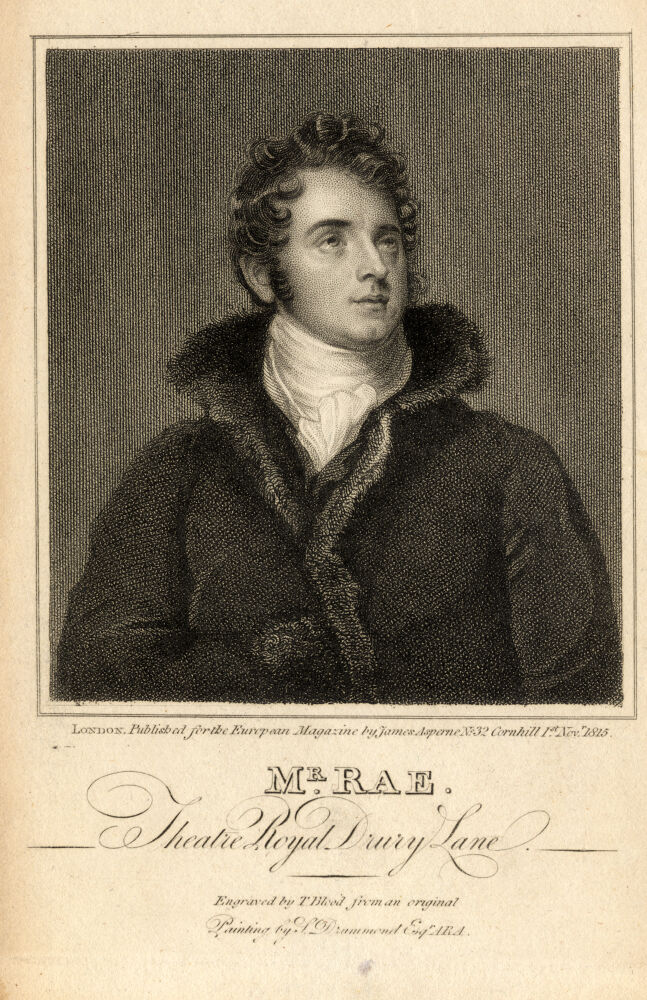
Rae in 1815.

Alexander Rae (1782–1820) was a British actor and stage manager. One of his first known appearances was in Bath in 1806. He made his London debut as Hamlet in 1812 at Drury Lane and went on to play Norval in Douglas and Hastings in Jane Shore amongst his many roles there. He was a Drury Lane regular until his death and initiated the role of Don Ordionio in Samuel Taylor Coleridge's Remorse in 1813. He played opposite Edmund Kean as Othello to his Iago in Othello and Bassiano to his Shylock in The Merchant of Venice. He succeeded James Grant Raymond as manager at Drury Lane. However, his allegedly dissipated lifestyle led to him quitting Drury Lane in 1820 and taking over the actor-managership of the Royalty Theatre, Wellclose Square in Whitechapel, where he struggled. Following an operation for a bladder stone the same year, he died of complications.

== Selected roles ==
- Don Ordiono in Remorse by Samuel Taylor Coleridge (1813)
- Fortescue in First Impressions by Horace Smith (1813)
- Count Conenberg in The Woodmans's Hut by Samuel Arnold (1814)
- John of Lorne in The Family Legend by Joanna Baillie (1815)
- De Zelos in Manuel by Charles Maturin (1817)
- Rashleigh Osbaldiston in Rob Roy by George Soane (1818)
- Ruthven in David Rizzio by Ralph Hamilton (1820)

== Bibliography ==
- Archer, Stephen M. Junius Brutus Booth: Theatrical Prometheus. SIU Press, 2010.
- Kahan, Jeffrey. The Cult of Kean. Routledge, 2017.
