= The Venetian Outlaw =

1805 play

- Original language: English
- Written by: Robert William Elliston
- Genre: Drama
- Setting: Venice

Premiere
- Date: 16 December 1805
- Place: Theatre Royal, Drury Lane, London

The Venetian Outlaw is an 1805 play by the British writer and actor Robert William Elliston. It premiered at the Theatre Royal, Drury Lane in London on 26 April 1805. The cast included James Grant Raymond as The Doge, William Barrymore as Count Orsono, Robert William Elliston as Vivaldi, William Powell as Alfieri, William Dowton as Calcagno, George Bartley as Carnevaro, George Cooke as Spalatro and Nannette Johnston as Rosara. The published play was dedicated by Elliston to George III. It was based on an 1801 French play L'Homme à Trois Visages by René-Charles Guilbert de Pixérécourt, which also inspired Rugantino by Matthew Lewis.

== Bibliography ==
- Greene, John C. Theatre in Dublin, 1745-1820: A Calendar of Performances, Volume 6. Lexington Books, 2011.
- Nicoll, Allardyce. A History of Early Nineteenth Century Drama 1800-1850. Cambridge University Press, 1930.
