= Osorio (play) =

Play by Samuel Taylor Coleridge

Osorio is a tragedy in blank verse by Samuel Taylor Coleridge. It was written in 1797 but was unperformed following its rejection by Drury Lane Theatre. Coleridge revised and recast the play sixteen years later, giving it the new title of Remorse. Remorse met with considerable critical and commercial success when it was first performed in 1813: it ran for twenty nights at Drury Lane and was issued in print three times within the year.

Despite the play's success, later critics dismissed the work as an Elizabethan pastiche. Swinburne said Remorse had "little worth praise or worth memory".

Historicist scholars, however, have identified a revolutionary viewpoint embedded within Osorio which Coleridge, disavowing his youthful radicalism, sought to dilute when he later reformulated the work to create Remorse.

Set in sixteenth-century Granada, the play is notable for its use of Gothic elements such as a castle, dungeon, cave and the supernatural. Coleridge's use of these may represent an attempt to elevate what he saw as the vulgar and sensational trappings of popular Gothic plays by situating them within a more refined form of poetic drama.

== Synopsis ==
=== Act I ===
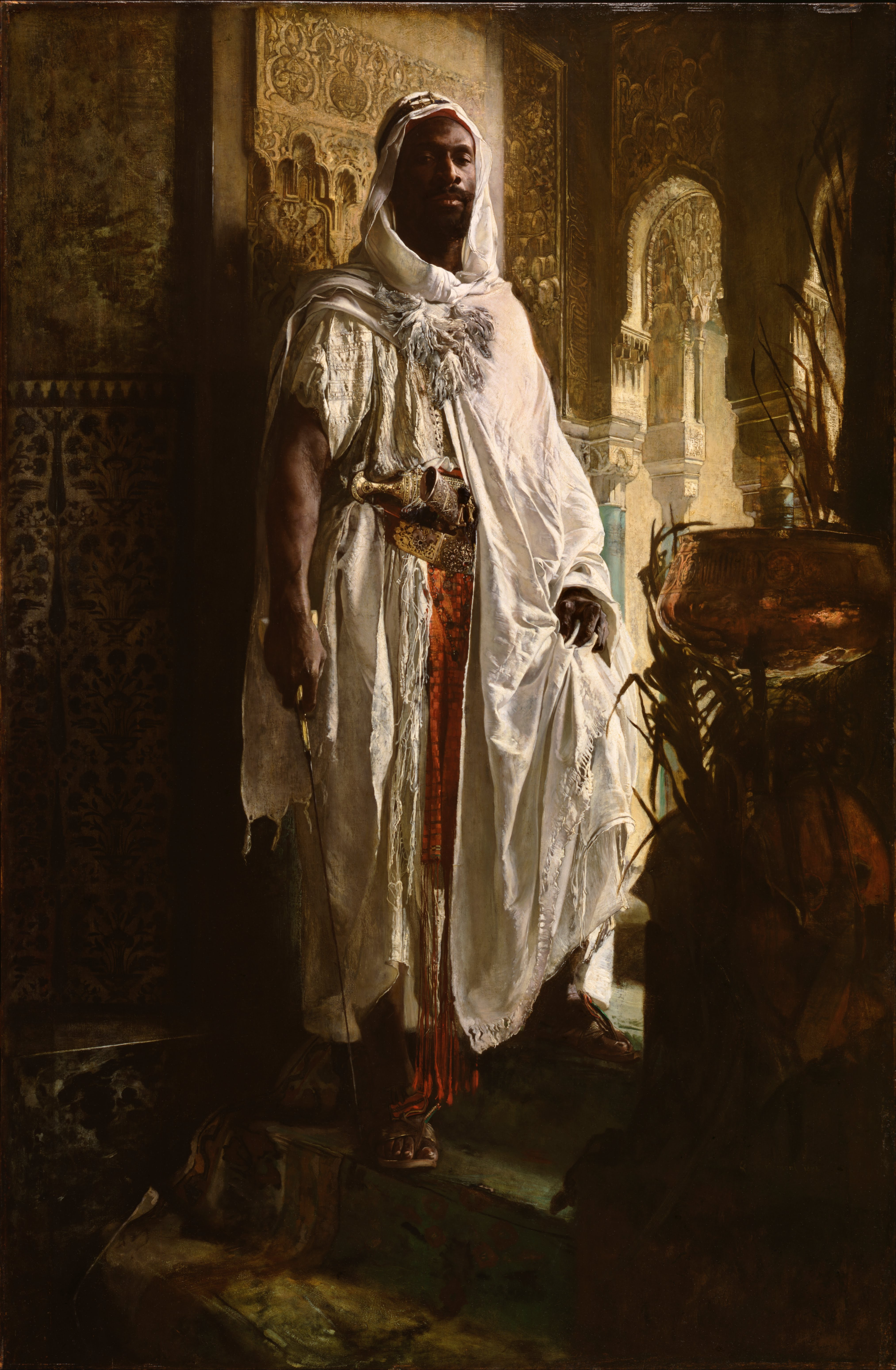
A Moor Chief

On a shore on the coast of Granada, Maria, the orphan ward of Velez, reaffirms her fidelity to Velez's son, Albert, who is missing. Velez urges the case for his other son, Osorio, the younger brother of Albert, but Maria dislikes Osorio. Velez believes Albert is dead because of Osorio's (false) report that he witnessed Albert's ship founder in a storm after it was captured as a prize by a Moorish pirate.

Velez and Maria are interrupted by Francesco, an inquisitor, who has arrested and imprisoned a Moresco, Ferdinand, on suspicion of relapsing to Islam. Alhadra, the Moorish wife of Ferdinand, pleads for Osorio to intervene on his behalf. Osorio declares he will question Ferdinand. He then departs, followed by Francesco and Velez.

Albert enters disguised as a Moor and wearing forbidden Moorish garments. He has been ‘loitering’ in the area for three weeks with a view to arousing the pain of remorse in Osorio and Maria for jointly plotting to have him murdered. When he encounters Maria, she fails to recognise him. Under the veil of a dream account, Albert relates the attempt on his life by a hired assassin. Maria's reaction to his account suggests to Albert that she was innocent of the assassination plot.

=== Act II ===
After arranging Ferdinand's release from prison, Osorio asks Ferdinand to trick Maria using a mock incantation to convince her that Albert is dead. Ferdinand was the assassin hired by Osorio to kill Albert. Osorio, convinced of Albert's death, is persuaded by Ferdinand to ask the "stranger" to trick Maria instead. Ferdinand relates how the stranger (the disguised Albert) has identified himself as "He that can bring the dead to life again".

Osorio goes to Albert's cottage and fails to recognise his disguised brother. He demands that Albert perform a fraudulent séance before Maria in which her portrait, which Albert used to wear around his neck, materialises. Osorio obtained the portrait from Ferdinand as proof of Albert's assassination. Osorio "returns" the portrait to Albert so that it can be used in the "dark trick". This will convince Maria that Albert is dead and encourage her to accept Osorio as husband.

=== Act III ===
Albert performs his act of sorcery before Maria, Velez and Osorio. Instead of using the portrait of Maria, however, Albert reveals a picture he has painted of his own assassination. Albert does this to show Osorio that his scheme to have his brother killed is known. Maria swoons and Velez is delighted by what he regards as a harmless manoeuvre by Osorio to convince Maria of Albert's death. Upon seeing the painting of Albert's assassination, Osorio immediately assumes that he has been betrayed by Ferdinand. He allows Francesco to imprison Albert for his sacrilegious act of sorcery.

=== Act IV ===
Osorio confronts Ferdinand in a dark cavern. The two men fight with swords before Ferdinand is disarmed and hurled down a chasm by Osorio to die.

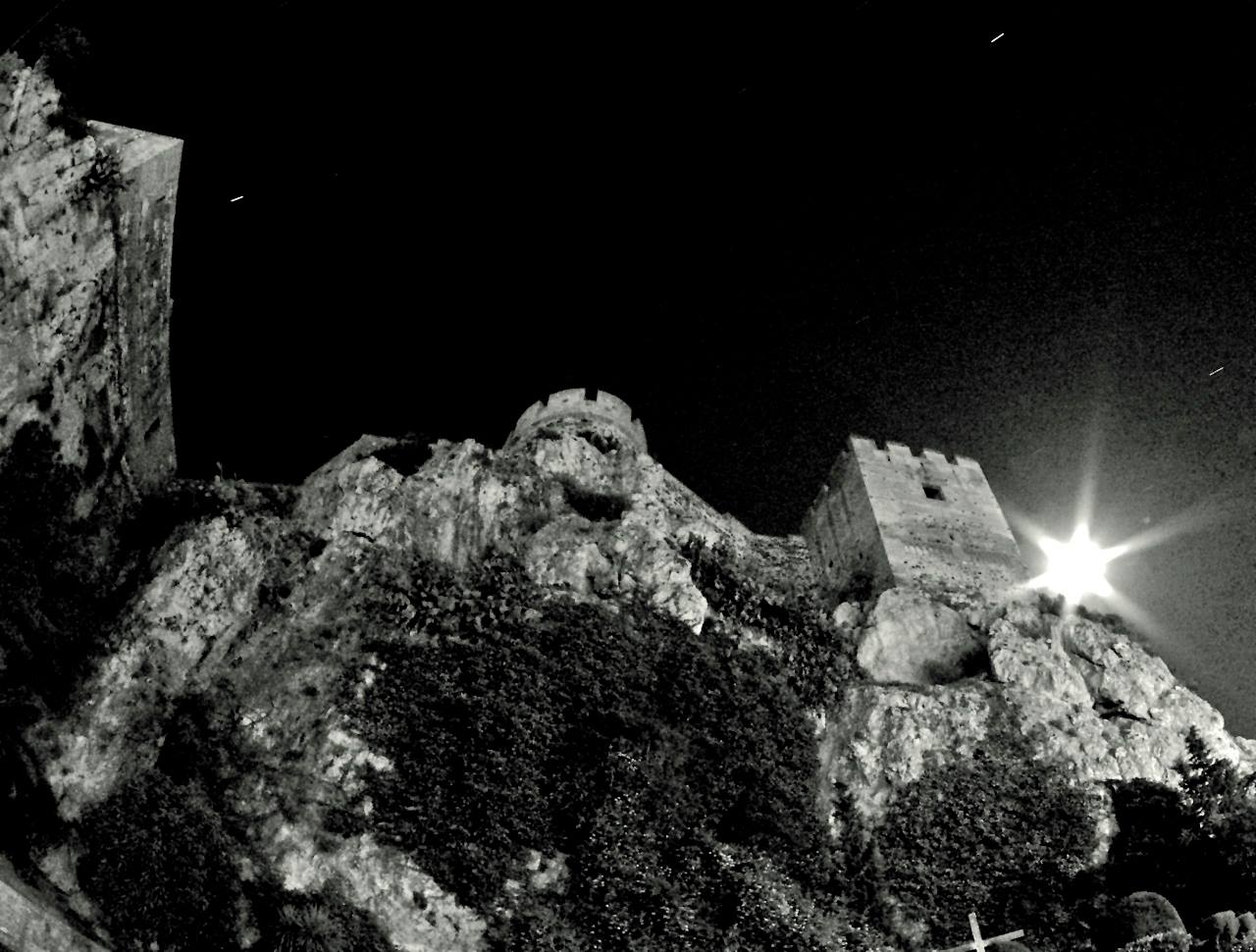
A castle near the coast of Granada

In the court before Velez's castle, Maria and her Foster-Mother discuss the stranger (Albert). The Foster-Mother recounts a tale of a baby boy found by a woodman. The boy was a wild child of nature but became a learned youth. He was imprisoned for heresy but escaped to the New World where it is believed "he lived and died among savage men". The tale awakens sympathy within Maria for the imprisoned Albert. Velez condemns Maria for stubbornly refusing Osorio, and Francesco suggests that Maria should enter a convent. Maria's response is to mock Francesco's faith and oppressive behaviour.

At night, Alhadra and her cohort of Moors meet in the mountains. In defiance of the Christian laws, they wear Moorish garments and proclaim their adherence to Mahomet. Alhadra reveals to the group that she followed Ferdinand to the cave and, after seeing Osorio leave the scene, entered the cave to hear Ferdinand's death groan in the chasm. She calls on the group to avenge his death.

=== Act V ===
Alhadra and the Moors capture Francesco but are prevented from killing him by Albert's companion, Maurice, who has joined the group. Alhadra and the Moors then proceed to the castle of Velez.

In the dungeon, Osorio visits Albert and reveals a tortured sense of remorse for Albert's disappearance. Maria enters with the intention of helping Albert escape and Albert finally reveals himself to Osorio. Although Osorio begs for forgiveness, he nevertheless craves punishment for his crimes. When Alhadra enters, Osorio openly admits to murdering Ferdinand, whereupon he is dragged away and killed by the Moors.

== Dates ==
Osorio was Coleridge's second drama, having written The Fall of Robespierre with Robert Southey in 1794. The creation of Osorio was prompted by a letter Coleridge received in February 1797 from W. L. Bowles through which Sheridan asked him "to write a tragedy on some popular subject". He began writing the work in March in Stowey, and on 6 June Coleridge read the first two and a half acts to William and Dorothy Wordsworth when he visited them at Racedown. Two days later, Coleridge wrote to Joseph Cottle that "Wordsworth admires my tragedy - which gives me great hopes". Coleridge had difficulties completing the work, however, and it was not until October that two copies of the play were prepared and sent to Bowles and William Linley (Sheridan's brother-in-law) for consideration.

Coleridge was informed by Linley in December that Sheridan had rejected the play because of "the obscurity of the last three acts". Despite the rejection, the play was appreciated by Poole, Southey and Wordsworth. Coleridge also recited the play to William Hazlitt and showed it to the Wedgwoods in June 1798. Coleridge thought of publishing the work with Wordsworth's drama, The Borderers, but instead printed two extracts, "The Dungeon" and "The Foster-Mother’s Tale", in Lyrical Ballads in 1798.

Sheridan communicated to Coleridge in May 1798 and July 1800 about the possibility of staging Osorio, but Coleridge resented Sheridan's cavalier handling of his manuscript and referred to him as "a damned impudent Dog". By October 1812, Sheridan's interests in Drury Lane had been bought out and the theatre was run by a subcommittee and largely managed by Samuel Whitbread and Samuel Arnold. Coleridge applied directly to Whitbread to request that his play, now entitled Remorse, be performed. The committee voted on 16 November to accept it.

== Osorio and Remorse ==
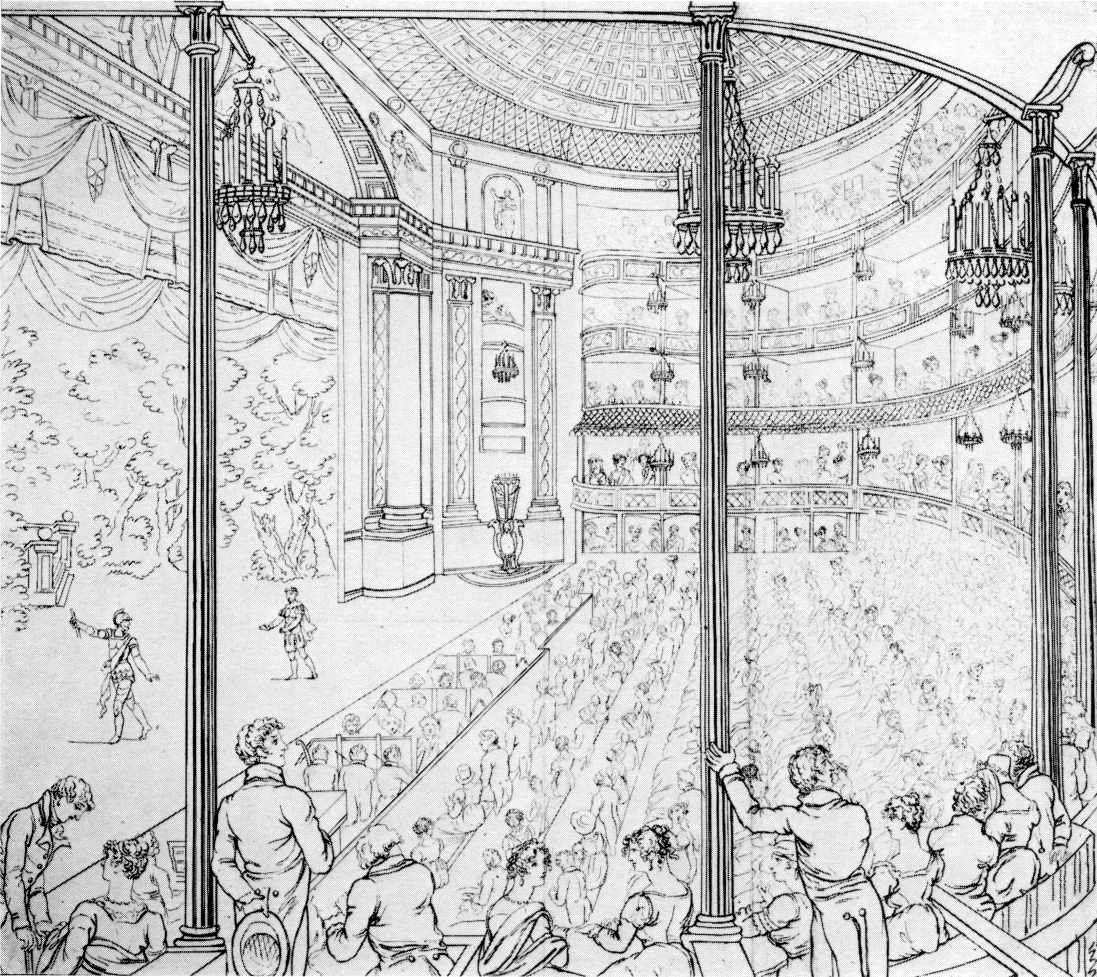
Theatre Royal Drury Lane in 1813

It is not known what text of the play Drury Lane received for consideration in 1812, but it is likely that the most extensive structural changes that made Remorse distinct from Osorio were undertaken only after the play went into production. The fact that Coleridge acknowledged the help he received from Arnold and the actors in making the play fit for the stage supports this view.

The revisions Coleridge made to Osorio to produce Remorse include the renaming of the characters and the rearrangement and supplementation of scenes and lines. Unlike Osorio, for example, who is dragged off by the Moors at the end of the play, Ordonio in Remorse is killed onstage. Among other passages, Coleridge also omitted "The Foster-Mother’s Tale" from Remorse, although it was printed in the appendices of the second and subsequent editions. Further significant structural changes include amendments to the first scene, which Don Alvar (Albert) opens in Remorse rather than first appearing in the latter part as Albert does in Osorio.

Coleridge also modified the incantation scene in Act III to produce a greater climactic moment. In Osorio, none of the characters have any faith in magic before or after the séance, which renders the scene undramatic. There is also confusion regarding which picture has been witnessed; in Remorse the image of Alvar's assassination is exposed amidst clashing music and stage effects to produce a shocking moment to which Valdez (Velez) reacts in horror.

=== Original cast ===
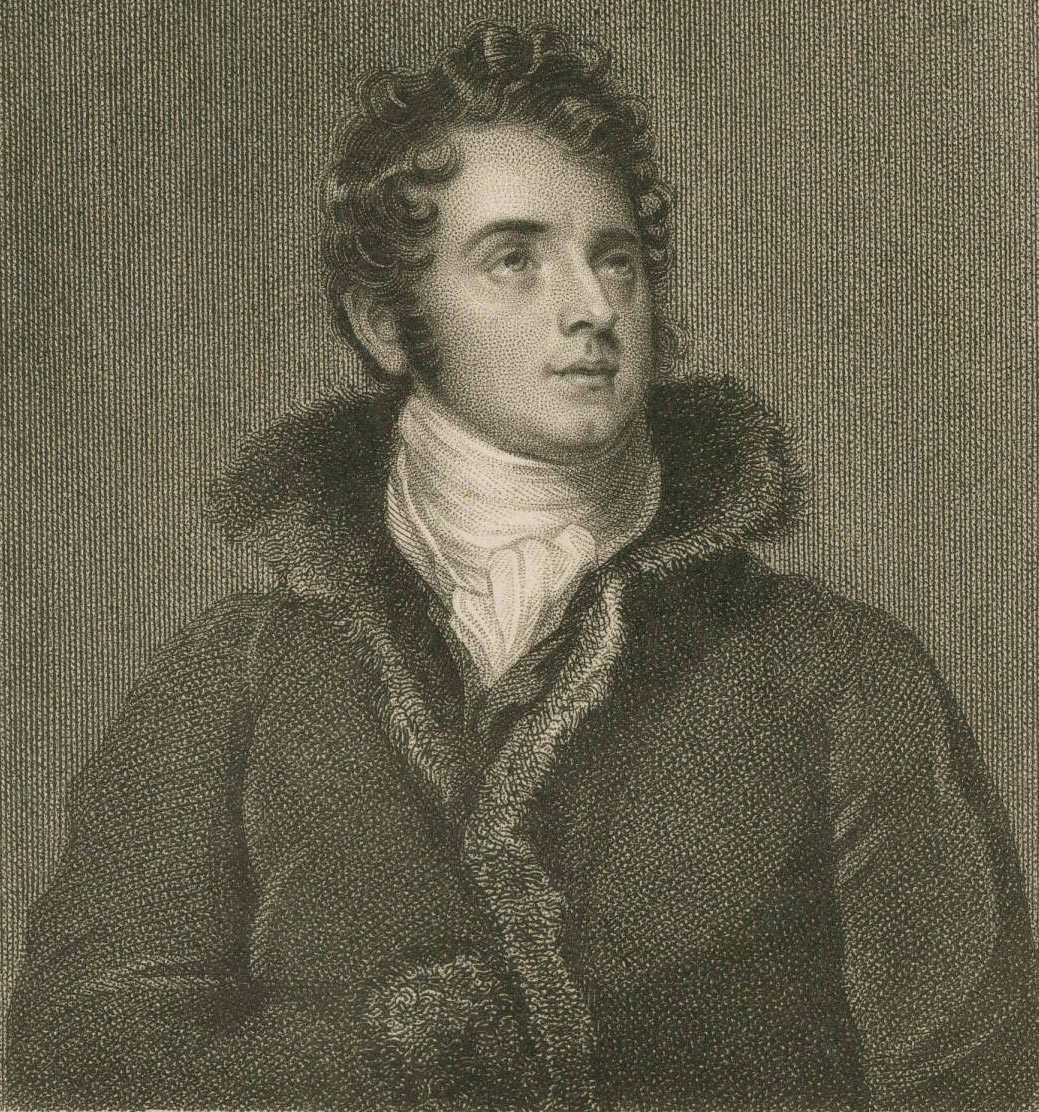
Alexander Rae was the original Ordonio (Osorio), "a character that did something to augment his reputation".

The following cast is from the original production of Remorse which ran from January - May 1813. The equivalent names of the characters from Osorio are in brackets.

- Don Alvar (Albert), the eldest son...Robert William Elliston
- Don Ordonio (Osorio), the youngest son...Alexander Rae
- Isidore (Ferdinand), a Moresco Chieftain, ostensibly a Christian...Vincent De Camp
- Donna Teresa (Maria), an orphan heiress...Sarah Smith
- Alhadra, wife to Isidore...Julia Glover
- Marquis Valdez (Velez), father of the two brothers, and Donna Teresa's guardian...Alexander Pope
- Monviedro (Francesco), a Dominican and Inquisitor...Snelling Powell
- Zulimez (Maurice), the faithful attendant on Alvar...Mr Crooke
- Naomi...James William Wallack
- Familiars of the Inquisition
- Moors and Servants, etc.

== Music ==
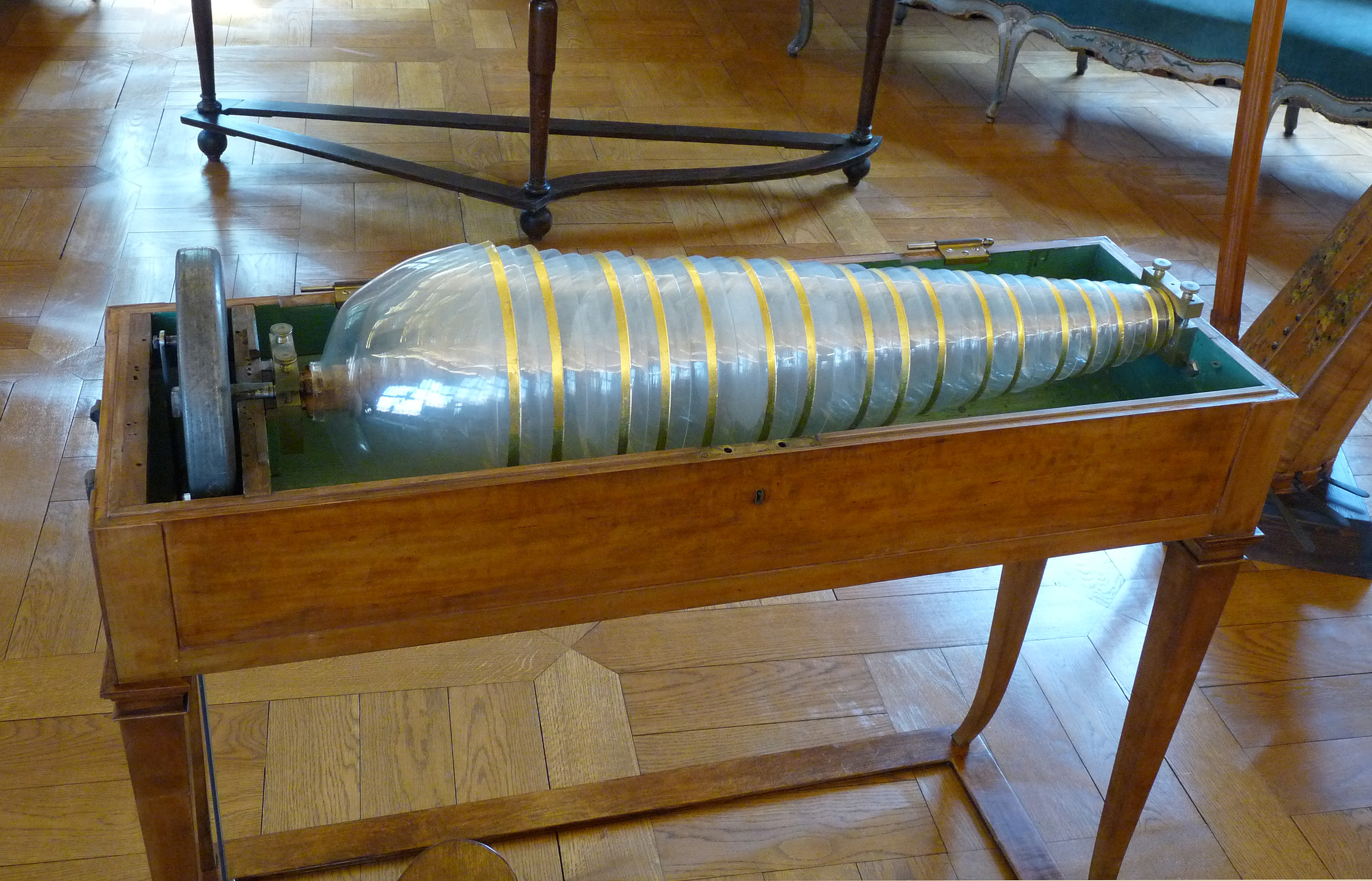
A glass harmonica

Two published settings were made of Albert's Invocation Song from Act III. The first was made by William Carnaby in 1802 who must have received the text from Sheridan. Coleridge claimed he discovered Carnaby's music only in 1813. Coleridge expressed indignation that his authorship was not acknowledged on the printed sheet music and that Sheridan had obviously suffered his manuscript of Osorio to "wander about the Town from his house".

The second published setting of the Invocation Song is by Michael Kelly, the music supervisor at Drury Lane during the production of Remorse. Kelly wrote that Coleridge considered "my music was everything he could have wished". Coleridge also said that Kelly's setting surpassed the efforts of composers in Italy who had also put the same words to music.

Coleridge's stage direction that the song should be accompanied by an "Instrument of Glass or Steel" refers to the glass harmonica. This direction provides a small example of Schiller’s influence over Coleridge's conception of the play. Schiller referred to the instrument in a similar sorcery scene narrated by the Sicilian sorcerer in The Ghost-Seer.

== Sources ==
For Osorio, Coleridge was chiefly indebted to the works of Schiller, in particular The Robbers, and the novel, The Ghost-Seer. The plot of Osorio is clearly drawn from the story narrated by the Sicilian sorcerer in The Ghost-Seer in which Jeronymo, who is betrothed to Antonia, goes missing and is believed to be the victim of Algerian pirates. The sorcerer is requested by Lorenzo, the younger brother and murderer of Jeronymo, to contrive the appearance of Jeronymo's spirit so that Lorenzo can marry Antonia.

Osorio's desire for Maria and his betrayal of Albert has parallels with the actions of Franz Moor in The Robbers. Franz strives to dispossess his brother Karl of his inheritance and his lover, Amelia. Karl forgives his brother, but Franz is punished by Karl's band of outlaws.

Robert Watson’s History of Philip II provided Coleridge with the setting for his play. From Watson’s book, Coleridge garnered information about the Inquisition and Philip’s persecution of the Morescoes. Coleridge used this to furnish his drama with details to which the characters often refer, such as the prohibition of native Moorish dress, religion and customs. These oppressive measures incited revolt in Spain in Watson’s account, and they are contributory reasons for the revolt of Alhadra and her followers in Coleridge’s drama.

== Critical interpretations ==
=== Biographical ===
The ambivalent relationship between Albert and Osorio has been likened to that between Coleridge and his brother, George. Coleridge’s discharge from the army in 1794 was facilitated by George who also took on his brother’s college debts. It has thus been argued that Coleridge "must have seen himself at times as Osorio receiving Albert’s forgiveness". On the other hand, Coleridge may on occasion have seen himself as the wronged Albert because of George's desires that his brother lead a more conventional lifestyle, which Coleridge resented. Coleridge's plans to create a Pantisocracy in the Americas had been met with hostility by his family, and he regarded them "as commonplace rich men, bigots from ignorance, and ignorant from bigotry".

=== Political ===
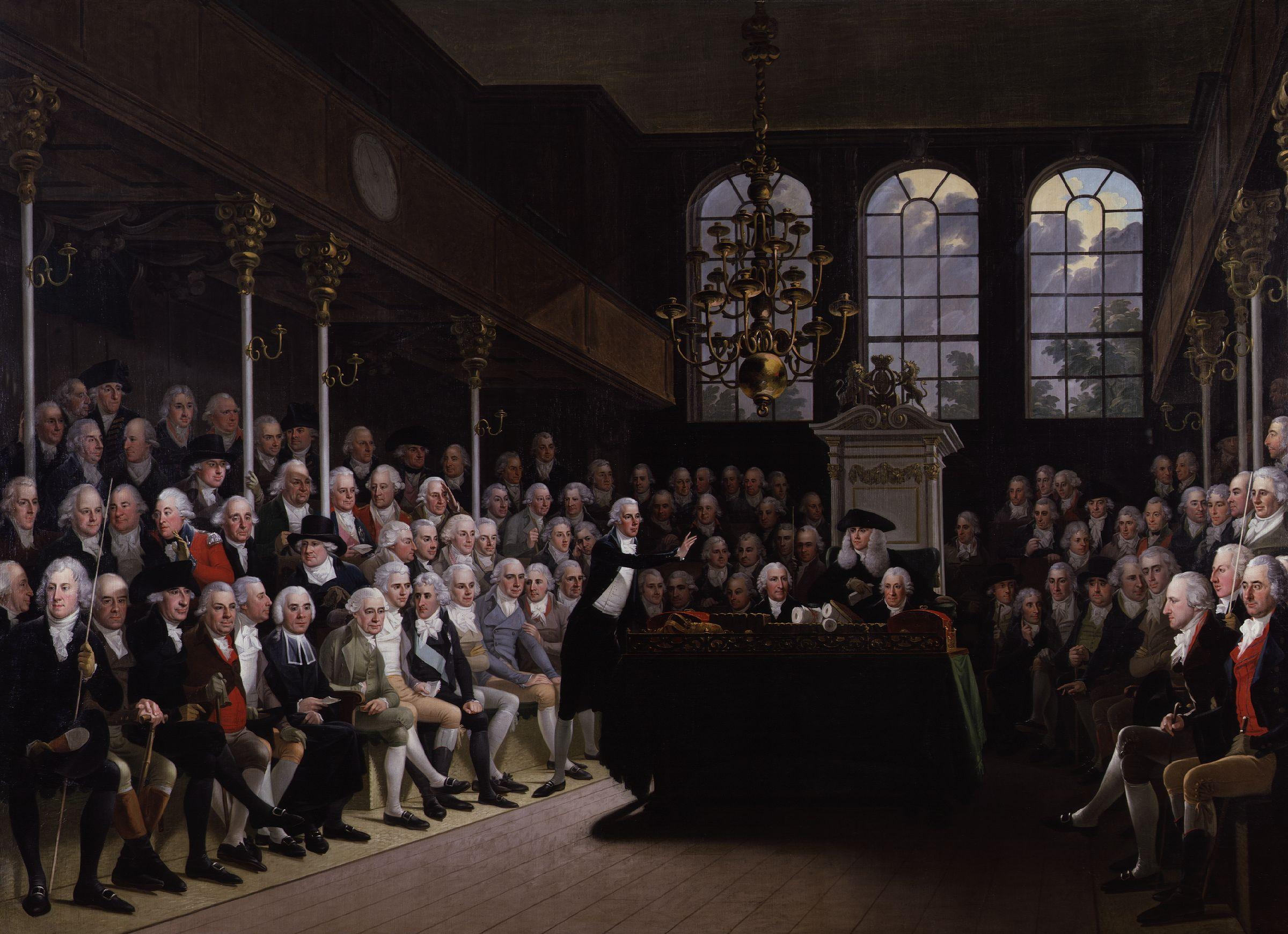
William Pitt addressing Parliament in Anton Hickel's The House of Commons, 1793–94

Some critics have attended to the political context in which Osorio was produced and how it reflects Coleridge's radicalism around 1797. The oppressive conduct of Francesco's Inquisition probably alludes to the Pitt government which Coleridge denounced for its reactionary measures such as the suspension of the Habeas Corpus Act in 1794 and the passing of the Seditious Meetings Act and the Treasonable Practices Act in 1795. By the time Coleridge had completed Remorse in 1812, however, he had adopted a considerably more conservative outlook. Some attempts to explain the differences between Osorio and Remorse have therefore focussed on Coleridge's political transformation. Rather than the despotism of Pitt, the tyranny condemned in Remorse may be that of Napoleon, whom Coleridge despised. Such rewriting has also been regarded as a sign of Coleridge using a Spanish setting, influenced by the Peninsular War, to address national identity.

Radical allusions are diminished in Remorse: the persecuted character of Alhadra, for example, is simplified in Remorse with the notable omission of her apocalyptic vengeance speech that ends Osorio. This reduction of Alhadra's complexity betrays Coleridge's diminished sympathy for the oppressed masses.

The excision of Albert's dungeon soliloquy in Act V ("The Dungeon" in Lyrical Ballads) from Remorse is another illustration of Coleridge's later conservatism. Dungeons like the Bastille were a potent Gothic symbol of ancien regime tyranny. Albert asserts that it is Nature, not the punitive "friendless solitude" of prison, that most effectively heals the "wandering and distemper’d child". Without such ideas, Remorse is much less politically and morally heterodox than Osorio.

=== Theatrical ===
The supernatural sorcery episode and the scenes in a castle, cave and dungeon demonstrates Coleridge's engagement with the Gothic conventions that were popular with contemporary audiences. Yet Coleridge, like Wordsworth, Hazlitt and Lamb, strongly disliked popular Gothic dramas because of their common emphasis on sensational spectacles rather than an audience's imagination. Coleridge identified the merit of Monk Lewis’s successful Drury Lane production of The Castle Spectre, for instance, as deriving entirely from "situations" that were "all borrowed, and all absolutely pantomimical". Osorio and Remorse can therefore be seen as Coleridge's attempt to accommodate popular Gothic features within a form of Shakespearean poetic drama that he regarded as more dignified.

One supernatural element in the play is the central dramatic suggestion that Albert is a walking spirit. It is never made explicit that Ferdinand did not in fact assassinate Albert. When Albert relates the attempt on his life to Maria in Act I, he only says that his assassins "thank’d me for redeeming them from murder". His decision later in the scene to "haunt this scene no more", Velez's remark to Maria in Act IV that the "Wizard haunts you", and Osorio's exclamation in the final act that Albert is a "Spirit of the dead!" are among many intimations that Albert is a ghost.
