= The Family Legend =

1810 play

- Original language: English
- Written by: Joanna Baillie
- Genre: Historical
- Setting: Scotland, fifteenth century

Premiere
- Date: 29 January 1810
- Place: Theatre Royal, Edinburgh, Scotland

The Family Legend is an 1810 historical tragedy by the Scottish writer Joanna Baillie. The idea of dramatising what was an old Highland tale was suggested to Baillie by her friend the sculptor Anne Seymour Damer, granddaughter of John Campbell, 4th Duke of Argyll.

The play premiered at the Theatre Royal in Edinburgh on 29 January 1810 and ran for thirteen consecutive nights. The Edinburgh cast included Henry Siddons, his wife Harriet Siddons and Daniel Terry. Its Edinburgh staging was due largely to the lobbying of Walter Scott on its behalf. On 29 May 1815 it debuted in London's West End at the Theatre Royal, Drury Lane with a cast that featured George Bartley as the Earl of Argyle, Alexander Rae as John of Lorne, James William Wallack as Maclean, Samuel Penley as Sir Hubert de Grey, John Powell as Loctorish Mrs Bartley as Helen and Susan Boyce as Rosa. It revolves around the historic rivalry of the Campbells and the Macleans.

== Bibliography ==
- Crochunis, Thomas C. Joanna Baillie, Romantic Dramatist: Critical Essays. Routledge, 2004.
- Hawkins, Ann R. Blackwell, Catherine, S. & Bonds, E. Leigh. The Routledge Companion to Romantic Women Writers. Taylor & Francis, 2022.
- Slagle, Judith Bailey. Joanna Baillie, a Literary Life. Fairleigh Dickinson Univ Press, 2002.
