= William Lovegrove =

English actor

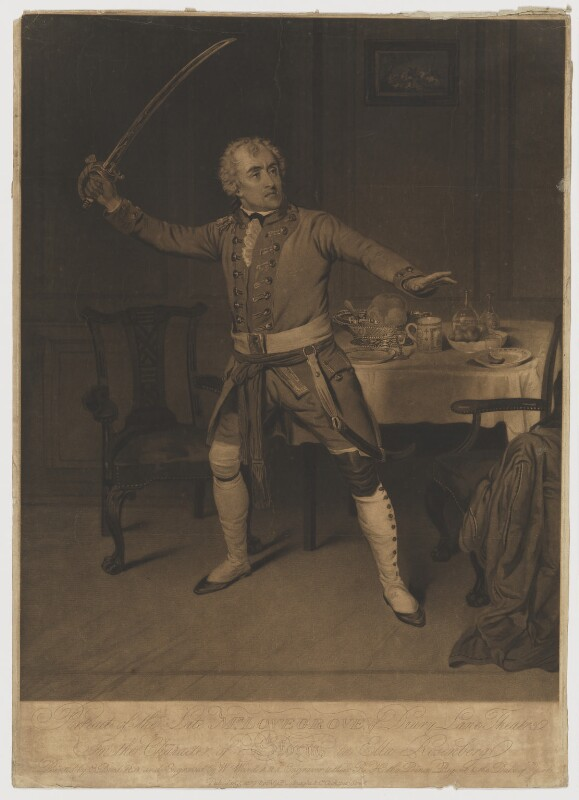
- Lovegrove by William Ward after Edward Bird
- Born: 13 January 1778; Shoreham, Sussex
- Died: 25 June 1816 (aged 38)
- Occupation: Actor

William Lovegrove (13 January 1778 – 25 June 1816) was an English actor.

== Biography ==
Lovegrove was the son of a plumber. He was born at Shoreham, Sussex, 13 January 1778, and was apprenticed to his father. After playing Hamlet as an amateur at a private theatre in Tottenham Court Road, he made a first public appearance at the Richmond Theatre under Winston in June 1799. Thence he went to Dublin, where he appeared as Anhalt in ‘Lovers' Vows,’ an adaptation from the German by Mrs. Inchbald. On his way to Manchester he was accidentally shot in the leg in a stage-coach, in a pocket of which a passenger had left a pistol. This delayed his arrival, and he appeared later in the season as Douglas and Jaques with little success. After playing in Guernsey and Plymouth, he made, 9 November 1802, under Dimond, his first appearance at Bath in Munden's part of Lazarillo in Jephson's farce of ‘Two Strings to your Bow.’ Gradus in ‘Who's the Dupe?’ Walter in ‘Children in the Wood,’ Edgar in ‘King Lear,’ Sir Luke Tremor in ‘Such things are,’ and Sir Bashful in the ‘Way to keep him,’ were acted during the season, in which he acquired popularity. When Edwin quitted Bath for Dublin, a large range of comic characters fell to Lovegrove, whose name appears in Bath and Bristol to Sir Andrew Analyse in the ‘Blind Bargain,’ Dr. Pangloss in the ‘Heir-at-Law,’ Sim in ‘Wild Oats,’ Trappanti in ‘She would and she would not,’ Sir Anthony Absolute, Delaval in ‘Matrimony,’ General Tarragan in ‘School of Reform,’ Croaker in the ‘Good-natured Man,’ Sir Hugh Evans, Dogberry, Isaac in the ‘Duenna,’ Autolycus, Sir Martin Marall, Alphonse in the ‘Pilgrim’ of Beaumont and Fletcher, and Justice Woodcock. During the summer season he played at Margate and Worthing. Bath proved once more the portal to London, and Lovegrove appeared 3 October 1810 at the Lyceum, the temporary home of the Drury Lane company, as Lord Ogleby in the ‘Clandestine Marriage.’ Job Thornberry in ‘John Bull’ and many favourite characters followed, and he played original parts in dramas by Dimond, Masters, Millingen, Arnold, and other writers. His Lopez in ‘Kiss,’ an alteration by Clarke of the ‘Spanish Curate,’ won him much applause. With the company in the new Drury Lane Theatre he remained until his retirement, rising to be one of the principal supports of the house. He married a Miss Weippert, the daughter of a harp-player. She died shortly after giving birth to a daughter, who did not long survive her. These two shocks produced a visible effect on his health. He took a benefit 15 June 1814, enacting Wilford in the ‘Iron Chest,’ and playing in a piece entitled ‘Cheating,’ by a friend named Parry. On 15 October, he was the original old Fathom in ‘Policy, or Thus runs the World away,’ attributed to Henry Siddons. Soon afterwards he broke a blood-vessel and was ill for many months, not reappearing until 21 June 1815, when for the first time, for his benefit, he played Sir Peter Teazle. His reception was so enthusiastic that he was overcome, and said, ‘O God, they will kill me with kindness.’ His name appears to one character in the next season, Realize in the ‘Will,’ 17 Oct. 1815. He was allowed a full salary until a relapse occurred and his recovery was seen to be hopeless, when he was granted a half salary until his death on 25 June 1816, near Bath, whither he had been taken by his sister.

Lovegrove was an excellent actor, and his premature death was a misfortune. As Rattan in the ‘Beehive,’ Peter Fidget in the ‘Boarding House,’ and Leatherhead in ‘M.P.,’ and in other similar parts, he was unsurpassed. Mathews speaks of him as ‘an admirable actor, quite in the style of the old school.’ A prudent and a reserved man, he mixed little in the pleasures of his fellows, and though much respected had few intimacies. He was the victim of a singular outrage or the subject of an extraordinary delusion. George Raymond, the biographer of Elliston, tells how Lovegrove once rushed to the Lyceum at midnight, covered with brickdust and mortar, and in a state of frenzy, stating that at the end of Dyott Street, Bloomsbury, he had been seized and pinioned by two stalwart women, forced into a house and thrust into a room, where a third woman was dying from the result of violence. By supreme efforts he won his freedom. After his recovery he took refuge in customary taciturnity, and no elucidation was afforded of the story (see Memoirs of Elliston, concluding ser. pp. 18–24, and Life and Enterprises of Elliston, pp. 178–81). Raymond says that Lovegrove was strong and natural, free from caricature, and never lost sight of the chastity of nature. His portrait by Samuel De Wilde as Lord Ogleby was in the Mathews collection in the Garrick Club. A plate of Lovegrove as Captain Rattan was in the ‘Theatrical Inquisitor’ for August 1816, and one in private dress in the ‘Monthly Mirror,’ new ser. vol. viii. November 1810.
