= Jeremy Diddler =

Fictional conman

Jeremy Diddler is a fictional character in James Kenney's 1803 farce Raising the Wind, based on an amusing importunist named Bibb, or “half-crown Bibb”.

A needy artful swindler, Diddler became a stock character in farce; the word “diddle” may be derived from him, or vice versa, and was a very common expression in the 19th and early 20th centuries.

Diddler is discussed in some detail in Herman Melville's The Confidence Man: His Masquerade. He appears in Thomas Haynes Bayly's novel David Dumps (chapter XV).
