= Mary Ann Rundall =

British educational writer

- Died: 2 October 1839; London, England

Mary Ann Rundall (died 2 October 1839) was a British educational writer who developed history books based on memorising facts using symbols.

== Life ==
Rundall ran a school in the town of Bath where she taught young ladies. Her sister, Elizabeth, was also a teacher, but of dance. Rundall became intrigued by the ideas of Gregor von Feinaigle who had published a book showing how to improve your memory. After he visited England in 1811 Rundall created an intriguing book entitled "Symbolic Illustrations of the History of England". This book aimed to encapsulate the facts of history into just 39 pages, but the book received unwanted attention from The Quarterly Review who ranted about her "most absurd book". The critic noted that 700 pages of text was required to support the 39 pages of symbols. It was not only Rundall but also Feinagle, who had developed the ideas in Germany, who attracted British criticism.

Rundall went on to publish a similar book and she made an income from taking on private pupils. She is not known to have any children but she was the aunt of ten children born to her sister and her husband Robert William Elliston who was a London theatre manager.

Rundall died in London in 1839.
