= Robert William Elliston =

English actor and theatre manager

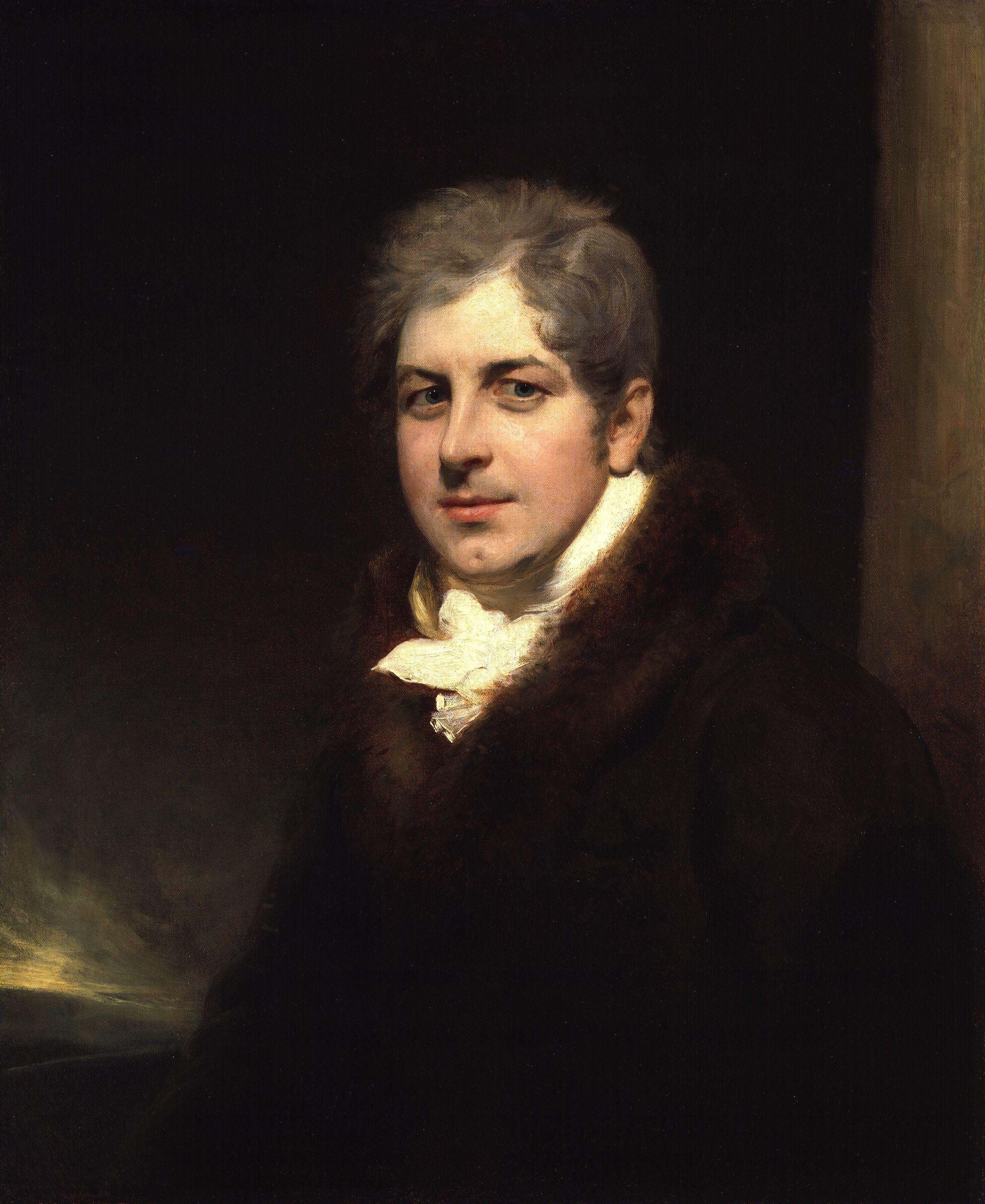
- Portrait by George Henry Harlow
- Born: 7 April 1774; London, England
- Died: 7 July 1831 (aged 57)
- Occupations: Actor, Manager

Robert William Elliston (7 April 1774 – 7 July 1831) was an English actor and theatre manager.

== Life ==
He was born in London, the son of a watchmaker. He was educated at St Paul's School, but ran away from home and made his first appearance on the stage as Tressel in Richard III at the Old Orchard Street Theatre in Bath in 1791. There he was later seen as Romeo, and in other leading parts, both comic and tragic, and he repeated his successes in London from 1796. In the same year he married Elizabeth, the sister of Mary Ann Rundall, and they would in time have ten children.

He acted at Drury Lane from 1804 to 1809, and again from 1812. From 1819 he was the lessee of the house, presenting Edmund Kean, Mme Vestris, and Macready.

He bought the Olympic Theatre in 1813 and also had an interest in a patent theatre, the Theatre Royal, Birmingham. Ill-health and misfortune culminated in his bankruptcy in 1826, when he made his last appearance at Drury Lane as Falstaff. As the lessee of the Surrey Theatre, he acted almost up to his death in 1831, which was hastened by alcoholism. At the Surrey, where he was the lessee first from 1806–14 and then again beginning in 1827, to avoid the patent restrictions on drama outside the West End, he presented Shakespeare and other plays accompanied by ballet music.

Leigh Hunt compared him favourably as an actor with David Garrick; Lord Byron thought him inimitable in high comedy; and Macready praised his versatility.

Elliston was the author of The Venetian Outlaw (1805), and, with Francis Godolphin Waldron, of No Prelude (1803), in both of which plays he appeared.

His son was Henry Twiselton Elliston.

== Selected roles ==
- Young Melville in The Land We Live In by Francis Ludlow Holt (1804)
- Edmond Rigid in Guilty or Not Guilty by Thomas Dibdin (1804)
- Vivaldi in The Venetian Outlaw by Robert William Elliston (1805)
- Henry Mortimer in A Prior Claim by Henry James Pye (1805)
- Lord Belmour in The School for Friends by Marianne Chambers (1805)
- Anson in The Vindictive Man by Thomas Holcroft (1806)
- Lothair in Adelgitha by Matthew Lewis (1807)
- Faulkener in Faulkener by William Godwin (1807)
- Fitzharding in The Curfew John Tobin (1807)
- Count Egmont in The Siege of St Quintin by Theodore Hook (1808)
- Don Alvar in Remorse by Samuel Taylor Coleridge (1813)
- Harcourt in First Impressions by Horatio Smith (1813)
