= Joanna Baillie =

Scottish poet and dramatist (1762–1851)

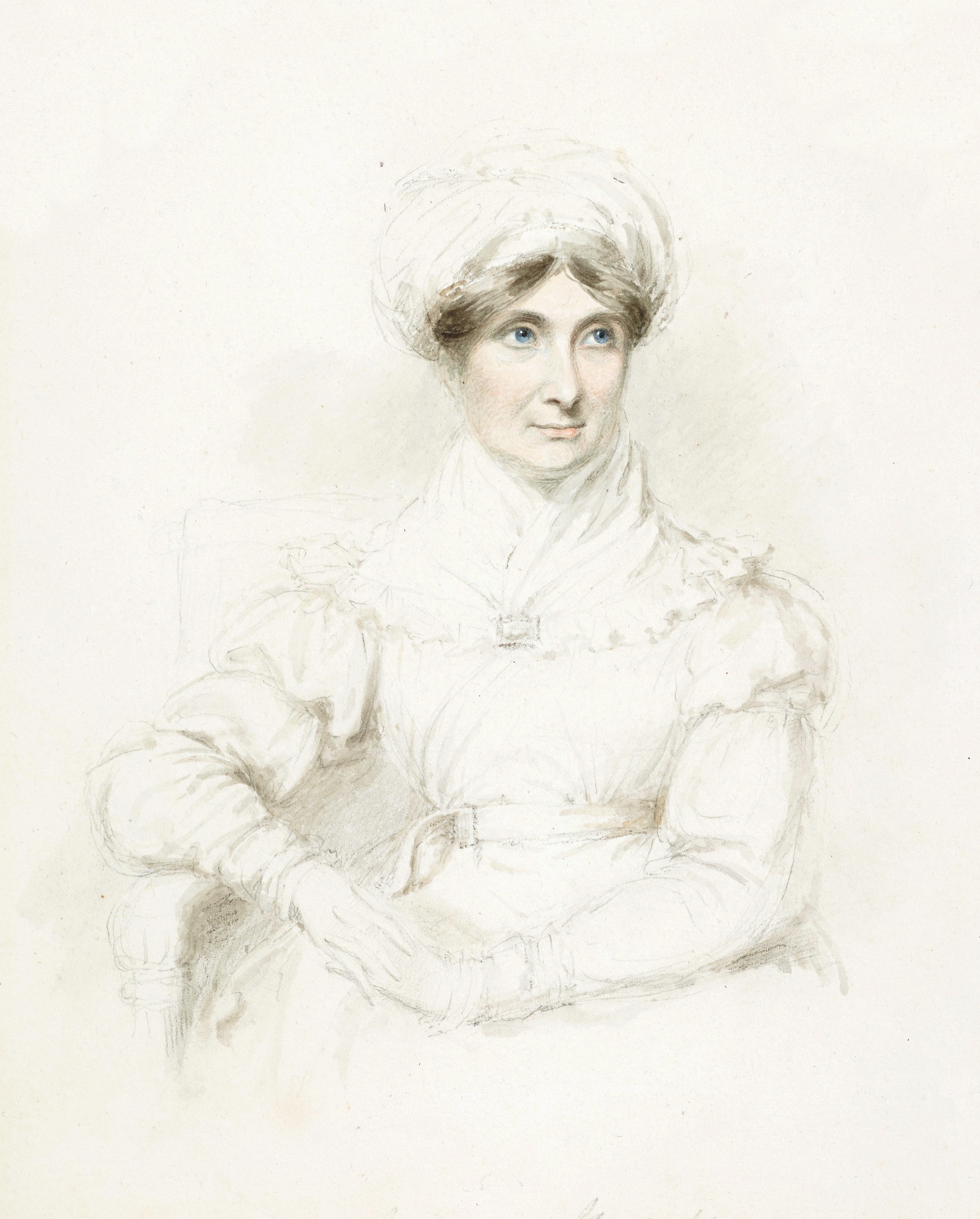
- c. 1825 drawing of Joanna Baillie
- Born: 11 September 1762; Bothwell (Kingdom of Great Britain)
- Died: 23 February 1851; Hampstead
- Resting place: St John-at-Hampstead
- Occupations: Poet, writer, tragedy writer

Joanna Baillie (11 September 1762 – 23 February 1851) was a Scottish poet and dramatist, known for such works as Plays on the Passions (three volumes, 1798–1812) and Fugitive Verses (1840). Her work shows an interest in moral philosophy and the Gothic. She was critically acclaimed in her lifetime, and while living in Hampstead, associated with contemporary writers such as Anna Barbauld, Lucy Aikin, and Walter Scott. She died at the age of 88.

== Early life ==
=== Background ===
Baillie was born on 11 September 1762 in Bothwell. Her mother, Dorothea Hunter (c. 1721–1806), was a sister of the Scottish physicians and anatomists William and John Hunter. Her father, Rev. James Baillie (c. 1722–1778), was a Presbyterian minister, and in his last two years Professor of Divinity at the University of Glasgow. Her aunt, Anne Home Hunter, was a poet. The Baillies were an old Scottish family which claimed descent from the Scottish patriot, Sir William Wallace. Wallace is not known to have had any children, however.

Joanna Baillie was the youngest of three children: her twin sister died unnamed as a baby, her surviving sister was Agnes Baillie (1760–1861), who lived to be a centenarian. Their brother, Matthew, became a London physician. Joanna was no dedicated scholar. Her early passions were for the Scottish countryside. She had her own pony and her interest in stories was demonstrated by plays she created and stories she told. At home she was dealt with strictly and displays of anger or glee were discouraged. She was not taken to the theatre. The only drama she saw was a puppet show.

In 1769, the family moved to Hamilton, where her father was appointed to the collegiate church. Baillie did not learn to read until the age of ten, when she attended Miss McDonald's Glasgow boarding school, ostensibly known for "transforming healthy little hoydens into perfect little ladies" (Carswell 266). She was said to have had 'an epiphany' when she first attended a theatre. From then she wrote plays and poems, as well as demonstrated her abilities in mathematics, music and art.

Baillie's father died in 1778 and their financial position decreased, although Matthew went on to study medicine at Balliol College, Oxford. The rest of the family retreated to Long Calderwood near East Kilbride. They returned in 1784, as her uncle Dr William Hunter had died the year before and her brother had been left a London house and his collection, which is now the University of Glasgow's Hunterian Museum and Art Gallery. Her aunt, Anne Hunter, was a society hostess and a poet, and through her Baillie was introduced to the bluestockings Fanny Burney, Elizabeth Carter, and Elizabeth Montagu. She studied Corneille, Racine, Molière, Voltaire and Shakespeare, and wrote plays and poetry while running their brother's household until he married in 1791. Her works were not published until that time, and even then anonymously, after both her father and uncle William had died in 1783.

Joanna and her sister and mother moved houses several times, before settling in Colchester, where she began her Plays on the Passions. In 1802 they moved to Hampstead, after her brother had inherited a considerable sum of money, where she would live with her sister for the next half-century. Neither sister married. Her aunt Anne Home Hunter introduced her to London literary society, after in 1800, a re- print of her work revealed her identity.

In 1806, Mrs Baillie died. Anna Laetitia Barbauld and her niece Lucy Aikin were neighbours and close friends. She wrote letters to Sir Walter Scott and they would visit and stay with each other; he wrote a prologue to her 1810 production of The Family Legend.

When she reached her seventies, Baillie experienced a year of ill health, but recovered and returned to writing and correspondence, and included Scottish folk songs in her Fugitive Verses written in her eighties (in 1840).

"[Joanna Baillie] was anxious that all her works with the exception of her theological pamphlet (see Religious writing) be collected in a single volume, and had the satisfaction of seeing this 'great monster book' as she called it, which appeared in 1851, shortly before she died. Though no longer robust — 'Ladies of four score and upwards cannot expect to be robust, and need not be gay. We sit by the fireside with our books' (Carhart, 62) — she had remained in good health until the end. She died in 1851 in Hampstead, almost 90 years old. Her sister Agnes lived on to be 100. Both sisters were buried alongside their mother in Hampstead parish churchyard, and in 1899 a sixteen-foot-high memorial was erected in Joanna Baillie's memory in the churchyard of her birthplace at Bothwell."

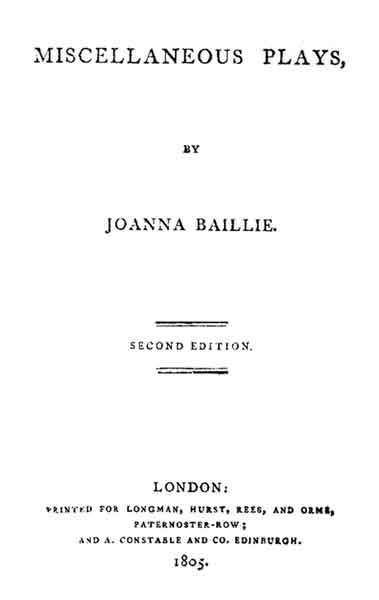
Title page of Joanna Baillie's Miscellaneous Plays (London: Longman, Hurst, Rees, and Orme, 1804)

== Literary and dramatic works ==
=== Poetry ===
- 1790 Baillie's first publication was Poems: Wherein it is Attempted to Describe Certain Views of Nature and of Rustic Manners. She later revised a selection of these early poems, which were reprinted in her Fugitive Verses (1840). Her first poem, "Winter Day", evoked winter sights and sounds in the neighbourhood of Long Calderwood.
- 1821 Her Metrical Legends of Exalted Characters told in verse the heroic stories of such historical figures as William Wallace, Christopher Columbus, and Lady Grizel Baillie. They were inspired in part by the popularity of Walter Scott's heroic ballads, her enthusiasm for which had made writing drama "less interesting for a time" (Baillie, Memoirs).
- 1836 Three volumes of Dramatic Poetry
- 1840 Encouraged by her old friend, banker-poet Samuel Rogers, Baillie issued a new collection, Fugitive Verses, some of which were old and some recently written. It was generally agreed that her popular songs, especially those in Scots, would live on.
- 1849 Baillie published the poem Ahalya Baee for private circulation. It subsequently appeared as Allahabad in 1904.

=== Plays ===
- 1790 A tragedy, Arnold, which was never published
- "A serious comedy", which was later burnt
- Rayner was heavily revised before it was published in Miscellaneous Plays (1804).
- 1791 Plays on the Passions first conceived
- 1798 The first volume of Plays on the Passions was published anonymously as A Series of Plays. Volume 1 consisted of Count Basil, a tragedy on love, The Tryal, a comedy on love, and De Monfort, a tragedy on hatred.

In a long introductory discourse, the author defended and explained her ambitious design to illustrate each of the deepest and strongest passions of the human mind. The plays, the author explained, were part of a still larger design and completely original concept, arising from a particular view of human nature, in which sympathetic curiosity and observation of the movement of feeling in others were paramount. Real passion, "genuine and true to nature", was to be the subject; each play was to focus on the growth of one master passion. This unusually analytical and arguably artificial approach generated much discussion and controversy, and in "a week or two Plays on the Passions was a main topic... in the best literary circles" (Carswell 273). The whole of London was excited to figure out who the author could be. Authorship was attributed to a male until someone pointed out that all of the protagonists were middle-aged women, rarely the muses of male authors (Carswell 274). Baillie finally revealed herself as the author in 1800, in the title-page of the third edition.

- 1800 De Monfort was produced at Drury Lane with John Kemble and Sarah Siddons in the leading roles. Splendidly staged, the play ran for eight nights, but was not a theatrical success. Features in the 2019 anthology Classic Plays by Women.
- 1802 The second volume of Plays on the Passions was published under Joanna Baillie's name, with a preface acknowledging the reception given to volume one: "praise mixed with a considerable portion of censure". Volume 2 consisted of The Election, a comedy on hatred, Ethwald, a tragedy in two parts on ambition, and The Second Marriage, a comedy on ambition. Baillie saw these plays, especially Ethwald, as exemplifying her best writing.
- 1804 A volume entitled Miscellaneous Plays; the tragedies Rayner and Constantine Paleologus, and a comedy, The Country Inn
- 1810 The Scottish-themed The Family Legend, produced at Edinburgh under the patronage of Sir Walter Scott, had a brief though brilliant success. It included a prologue by Scott and an epilogue by Henry Mackenzie. Its success encouraged the theatre managers to revive De Monfort, which was also well received.
- 1812 A third and final volume of Plays on the Passions consisted of two gothic tragedies, Orra and The Dream, a comedy, The Siege, and a serious musical drama, The Beacon. The tragedies and comedy represented the passion of Fear, while the musical drama represented Hope. Introducing what she called "probably the last volume of plays I shall ever publish," she explained that she intended to complete her project by writing further dramas on the passions of Remorse, Jealousy and Revenge, but did not intend to publish them, as publication had discouraged stage production.
- 1815 The Family Legend, produced at Drury Lane, London
- 1821 De Monfort [sic] was produced at Drury Lane, London, with Edmund Kean in the title role. Constantine Paleologus, though written with John Kemble and Sarah Siddons in mind, was declined by Drury Lane. It was produced at the Surrey Theatre as a melodrama, Constantine and Valeria, and in its original form at Liverpool, Dublin and Edinburgh.
- 1836 Three volumes of Miscellaneous Plays were published. They included nine new plays, and the continuation of Plays on the Passions promised earlier: a tragedy and comedy on jealousy and a tragedy on remorse. Their publication created a stir, and critics were almost all enthusiastic and welcoming. Fraser's Magazine declared, "Had we heard that a MS play of Shakespeare's, or an early, but missing, novel of Scott's, had been discovered, and was already in the press, the information could not have been more welcome" (Fraser's Magazine, p. 236).

Baillie's reputation does not rest entirely on her dramas; she also authored poems and songs admired for their beauty. Considered the best are the Lines to Agnes Baillie on her Birthday, The Kitten, To a Child and some of her adaptations of Scottish songs, such as Woo'd and Married an'a'. Scattered through the dramas are some lively and beautiful songs: The Chough and The Crow in Orra, and the lover's song in The Phantom. Her poem A Mother to her Waking Infant was thought 'closely observed' from watching interaction of babies and mothers in her circle.

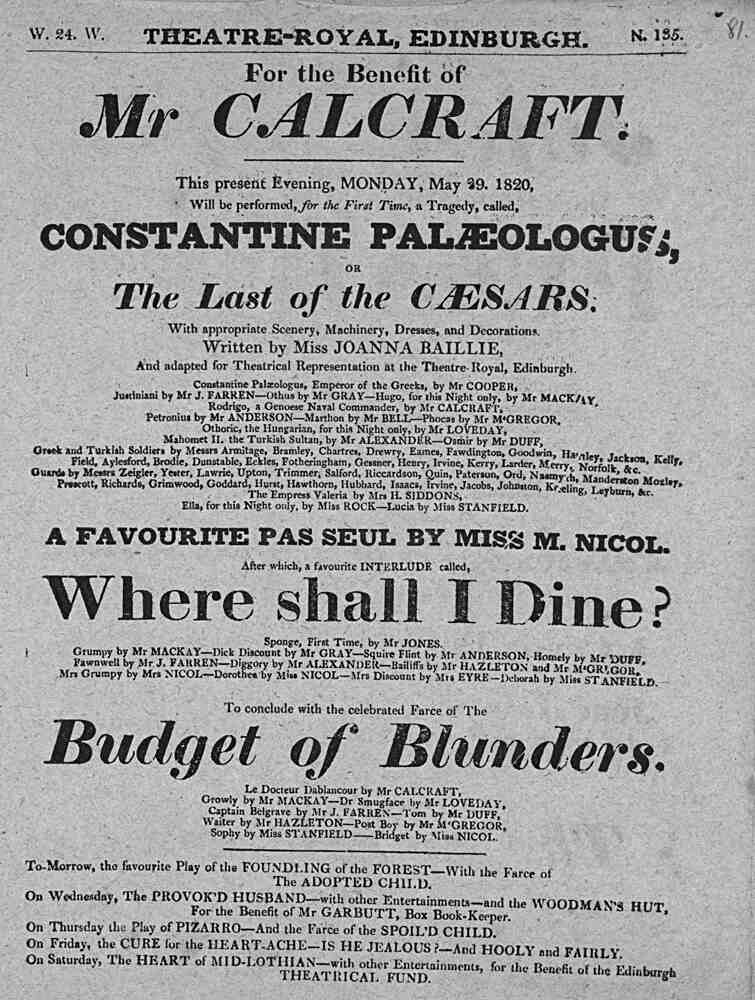
Playbill for Joanna Baillie's The Last of the Caesars; or, Constantine Palaeologus at the Theatre Royal Edinburgh, 29 May 1820

== Defending her stage plays ==
Initially, Baillie was reluctant to publish her works. In a letter to Sir Walter Scott, she wrote, "Were it not that my Brother has expressed a strong wish that I should publish a small vol: of poetry, I should have very little pleasure in the thought." This shyness is in keeping with her humble, contented disposition. She did not seek acclaim for her poems, but simply wrote them for enjoyment. Ironically, they have become better known than her plays.

However, in an 1804 prefatory address in Miscellaneous Plays, Baillie defended her plays as acting plays. The criticism that she had no understanding of practical stagecraft and that her plays were torpid and dull in performance rankled throughout her life, and she was always delighted to hear of a production being mounted, no matter how humble it might be. She believed that critics had unfairly labelled her work as closet drama, partly because she was a woman and partly because they had failed to read her prefaces with care. She pointed also to the conventions of the theatre in her time, when lavish spectacle on huge stages was the order of the day. Her own plays, with their attention to psychological detail, worked best, she argued, in well-lit small theatres where facial expressions could clearly be seen. She wrote, "I have wished to leave behind me in the world a few plays, some of which might have a chance of continuing to be acted even in our canvas theatres and barns." It is clear that Baillie wanted her plays to be acted, not just read.

== Religious writing ==
Growing up as a Presbyterian minister's daughter, religion had always been important to Baillie. In 1826 she published The Martyr, a tragedy on religion, intended for reading only. In 1831 she entered into public theological debate with a pamphlet, A view of the general tenour of the New Testament regarding the nature and dignity of Jesus Christ, where she analysed the doctrines of order in the Trinity, Arianism, and Socinianism. As she mentions in the preface to The Martyr, Baillie was concerned about the "many perplexing and contradictory doctrines" that "churchmen" had added to the Bible. Believing that "no Christian — no Protestant Christian, regulates, or at least ought to regulate, his faith by any thing but what appears to him to be really taught in Scripture,” she devoted most of A view of the general tenour of the New Testament regarding the nature and dignity of Jesus Christ to presenting relevant passages in the New Testament so that those with "[g]ood intentions [and] a clear common understanding" could make their own decisions regarding the question of Christ's divinity. The Unitarian minister Thomas Sadler, who preached her funeral sermon, appreciated not only "her own free and diligent search after revealed truth" but also the way that she "respected the faithful convictions of others in proportion as she valued her own."

== Philanthropy and literary advice ==
Financially secure herself, Joanna Baillie customarily gave half her earnings from writing to charity, and engaged in many philanthropic activities. In the early 1820s she corresponded with a Sheffield campaigner, James Montgomery, in support of his efforts on behalf of chimney sweeps. She declined to send a poem, fearing that was "just the very way to have the whole matter considered by the sober pot-boilers over the whole kingdom as a fanciful and visionary thing," whereas "a plain statement of their miserable lot in prose, accompanied with a simple, reasonable plan for sweeping chimneys without them" was far better strategically (letter, 5 Feb 1824).

Where literary matters were concerned, Joanna Baillie had a shrewd understanding of publishing as a trade. She took seriously the influence her eminence gave her, and authors down on their luck, women writers, and working-class poets like the shoemaker poet John Struthers applied to her for assistance. She wrote letters, drew on all her contacts, and used her knowledge of the literary world to advise or to further a less well-connected writer. In 1823, she edited and published by subscription a collection of poems by many leading writers of the day, in support of a widowed old school friend with a family of daughters to support.

Baillie befriended the eccentric American writer, critic and activist John Neal, after reading his article "Men and Women" in Blackwood's Magazine in October 1824. He in turn admired Baillie's poems and plays and welcomed the attention from the more established literary figure.

Wordsworth himself considered Baillie the "ideal gentlewoman", despite the fact that she was Scottish (Zell 19). Her most famous work, De Monfort, helped to inspire Lord Byron's closet drama Manford (Strand 1). Byron went on to value her advice, calling her "the only dramatist since Orwan" (Zell 19). In 1806 Baillie solidified a friendship with Scott and she and her sister would often visit Scotland (Strand 1).

== Reputation and legacy ==
American critic and writer John Neal referred to Baillie in an 1866 Atlantic Monthly article as the "female Shakespeare of a later age".

John Stuart Mill, in his Autobiography, recalled that in childhood, Baillie's Constantine Paleologus seemed to him "one of the most glorious of human compositions" He continued to see it "one of the best dramas of the last two centuries".

Two songs from Ethwald, Hark! the cock crows and Once upon my cheek he said the roses grew, were set to music by the English composer John Wall Callcott. Beethoven also set her poem O Swiftly Glides the Bonny Boat to music in 1815.

One of her few detractors was Francis Jeffrey, who in 1803 published a long condemnatory review of the Plays on the Passions in the Edinburgh Review. He attacked the narrow theory, practice and purpose of the plays. Though he praised her "genius", Baillie marked Jeffrey down as a literary enemy and refused a personal introduction. Not until 1820 would she agree to meet him; but they became warm friends. James Hogg referenced their earlier clash in John Paterson's Mare, his allegorical satire on the Edinburgh publishing scene first published in the Newcastle Magazine in 1825, in which Baillie features as "a very interesting Scotch girl".

Maria Edgeworth, recording a visit in 1818, summed up her appeal for many: Both Joanna and her sister have most agreeable and new conversation, not old, trumpery literature over again and reviews, but new circumstances worth telling, apropos to every subject that is touched upon; frank observations on character, without either ill-nature or the fear of committing themselves; no blue-stocking tittle-tattle, or habits of worshipping or being worshipped.

Joanna Baillie offered a new way of looking at drama and poetry. She was revered by poets on both sides of the Atlantic; many of her contemporaries placed her above all women poets except Sappho. According to Harriet Martineau, she had "enjoyed a fame almost without parallel, and... been told every day for years, through every possible channel, that she was second only to Shakespeare." Works of hers were translated into Sinhalese and German, and she was performed widely in both the United States and Britain.

Yet even when Martineau met her in the 1830s, that fame seemed to belong to a bygone era. There were no revivals of her plays in the 19th or 20th century, though her tragedies might seem suited to the intimacy of television or film. Not until the late 20th century did critics began to recognize how her intimate depictions of the human psyche had influenced Romantic literature. Scholars now recognize her importance as a stage innovator and dramatic theorist, and critics and literary historians of the Romantic period concerned with reassessing the place of women writers acknowledge her significance.

Joanna Baillie was great friends with Lady Byron. This friendship led her to be close friends and colleagues with Lord Byron as well. Lord Byron even attempted to get one of her plays to be performed at Drury Lane, sadly to no avail. Their friendship continued until a domestic division arose between Lord and Lady Byron, leaving Baillie to take the side of her friend. After this, she was more critical of Lord Byron and his work, calling his characters "untrue to nature and morally bankrupt" While they were still polite to each other as literary contemporaries, their friendship did not return.

One of those Baillie corresponded with most was Sir Walter Scott. The two wrote enough letters to each other to fill a sizeable volume. Scott appreciated and supported Baillie as a literary contemporary, but their relationship did not stop there. Their letters are full of personal details and conversations about their families. While they both respected each other's work, their friendship was deeper than just professional.

On 11 September 2018, to commemorate the 256th anniversary of her birth, Google released a Google Doodle celebrating her, and her work has 'enjoyed a resurgence of popularity' in recognition of her circumstances.

== Sources ==
- Joanna Baillie. Letter, 5 February 1824, Wellcome Library for the History and Understanding of Medicine, London
- Joanna Baillie. Further Letters of Joanna Baillie, ed. Thomas McLean. Madison: Fairleigh Dickinson University Press, 2010
- Joanna Baillie. "Memoirs written to please my nephew, William Baillie". The Scotswoman at Home and Abroad: Non-Fictional Writing 1700–1900, ed. Dorothy McMillan. Glasgow: The Association for Scottish Literary Studies, 1999
- Joanna Baillie and Judith Bailey. Slagle. The Collected Letters of Joanna Baillie. Vol. 1. Madison: Fairleigh Dickinson UP, 1999. Print
- William D. Brewer. "Joanna Baillie and Lord Byron". Keats-Shelley Journal, vol. 44, 1995, pp. 165–181
- Donald Carswell. Sir Walter: A Four-Part Study in Biography (Scott, Hogg, Lockhart, Joanna Baillie). John Murray: London, 1930
- Margaret S. Carhart. The Life and Work of Joanna Baillie. New Haven: Yale University Press, 1923
- Norma Clarke. "Baillie, Joanna (1762–1851)", Oxford Dictionary of National Biography. Oxford: Oxford University Press, September 2004; online ed., January 2006 accessed 5 October 2006
- Fraser's Magazine, 13 (1836), 236
- Augustus J. C. Hare. The Life and Letters of Maria Edgeworth. 2 vols. London: Edward Arnold, 1894
- Martineau, Harriet. Autobiography (1877), vol. 1. London: Virago, 1983
- Fiona Price. "Baillie, Joanna, 1762–1851", Literature Online Biography. Durham University. Cambridge: Chadwyck-Healey, 2000 accessed 5 October 2006
- Ginger Strand. "Baillie, Joanna". Continuum Encyclopedia of British Literature, ed. Steven Serafin and Valerie Grosvenor Myer, Continuum, 2006. Credo Reference
- P. M. Zell. "The Cool World of Samuel Taylor Coleridge: The Question of Joanna Baillie". The Wordsworth Circle, vol. 13, no. 1, 1982, pp. 17–20
