= Old Broadway Theatre =

Former theatre in Manhattan, New York

Coordinates: 40.7158°N 74.0045°W

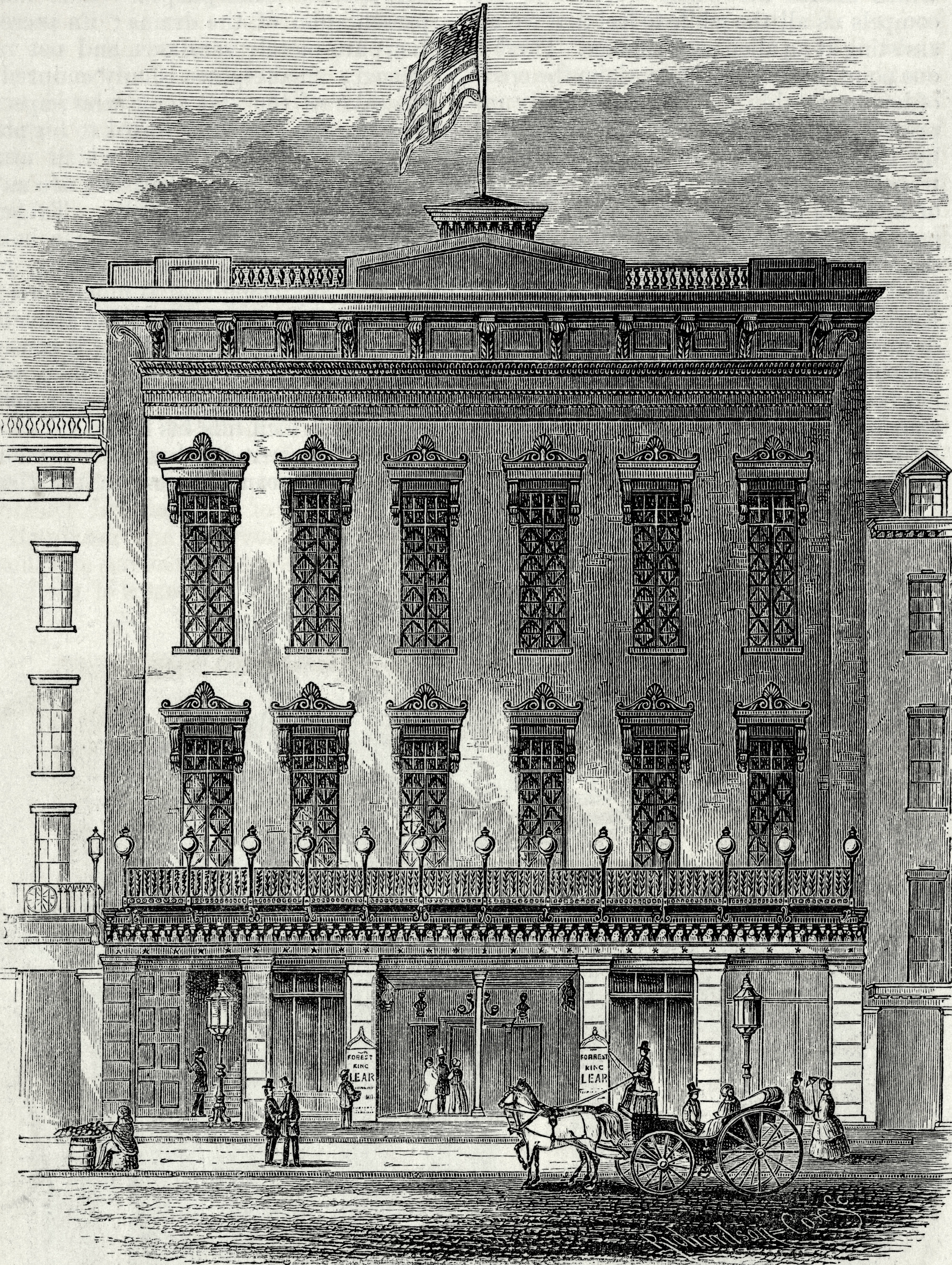
- Interactive map of the Old Broadway Theatre area

General information
- Location: Manhattan, New York City
- Opened: September 27, 1847
- Closed: April 2, 1859
- Demolished: April — June 1859

The Broadway Theatre, called the Old Broadway Theatre since its demise, was at 326–30 Broadway, between Pearl and Anthony (now Worth) Streets in Lower Manhattan, New York City. With over 4000 seats, it was the largest theater ever built in New York when it opened. During its brief existence, many prominent performers of the era appeared on its stage. It presented plays, opera, ballet, hippodrama, and circus performances in a space that was reconfigured several times. The operators always struggled to make money, however, and after twelve years the Broadway Theatre was replaced by a more profitable building, for the textile trade.

== The founding ==
The original projector of the Old Broadway Theatre was Thomas S. Hamblin, in an agreement with James R. Whiting. But on April 25, 1845, just as Hamblin was about to begin construction, his Bowery Theatre burned to the ground, involving him in a loss of $100,000. At first he announced he was carrying on with his plan. Then he was publicly opposed by David Hale, editor of The Journal of Commerce and prominent member of the Broadway Tabernacle, across Anthony Street, which was used as a venue for concerts and other events. The New York Herald thought Hale objected to the prospect of competition so close by. Hamblin gave the project up.

Col. Alvah Mann, a well-known circus proprietor, then commenced the erection of it. After spending $14,000, he was obliged to call in the aid of James R. Raymond, a wealthy touring-menagerie owner, in order to complete the building. George Barrett was the initial acting and stage manager, and assembled the stock company of actors. On January 24, 1848, a few months after the theatre opened, Mann took a partner, E. A. Marshall, manager of the Walnut Street Theatre in Philadelphia, with "[t]he sole management of the Theatre, so far as its dramatic and theatrical arrangements are concerned, ... in the hands of Mr. Marshall. ... " Barrett left and was replaced by William Rufus Blake on February 21. The partnership was dissolved on October 25, 1848, Mann relinquished the building to Raymond, who held a mortgage on it, and Marshall became sole lessee and manager. He remained with the theater nearly ten more years.

== The building ==
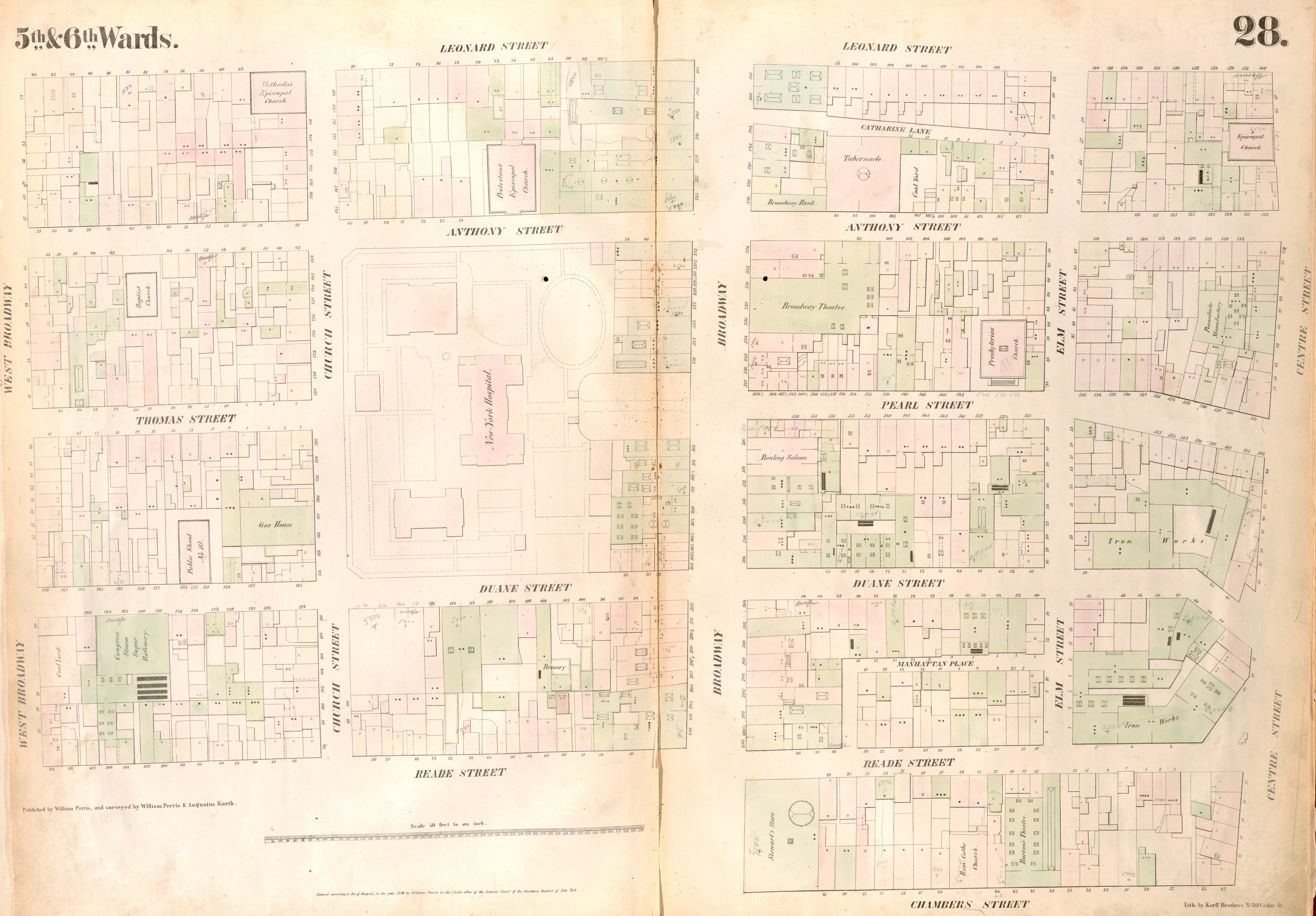
Map published in 1853

One writer called the location "the very best spot in the city. It is accessible by all the omnibus lines, in the midst of the hotels, on high and wholesome ground." John M. Trimble was the theater's architect, and Addison Alger was the contracted mason and carpenter. The L-shaped lot had 75 feet on the south side of Anthony Street and the same on the east side of Broadway, the main entrance; it was 175 feet deep west to east. The façade on Broadway was three stories high and finished to look like stone. The upper stories each had six colored-glass windows. A balcony with thirteen large gas-lit globes overlooked the sidewalk from the second floor. (All the gas for the theater was manufactured in the rear basement from oil, to save money.) There was a square observatory on top. The Evening Post called the theater "a decided ornament to Broadway".

The effect on entering the house was called "brilliant in the extreme". It was lighted by thirteen chandeliers, each under a colorful grotesque figure of a Moor in the attitude of feeding it with oil. The stage curtain was of fringed crimson silk looped up by cords, and the drop depicted a Swiss landscape. The ornaments throughout the theater were gold on a white ground, and the fronts of the boxes represented a chase beginning on the lowest front, and continuing on the other two, turning alternately from right to left and from left to right. The top of the stage was adorned with portraits of Washington and Lafayette with the arms of New York State and the United States. The orchestra pit, surrounded by an open balustrade, was twelve feet by twenty-seven, with a double floor and a sounding chamber to increase the body of tone, especially of the cellos and basses. The stage was ninety-five feet wide by eighty-seven deep, and forty-seven feet across the proscenium.

The arrangement of seats was unusual for the period. The pit was transferred from the ground floor to the gallery (third tier), and in its place the inclined plane of the dress circle (first tier) was extended with the slope of an amphitheatre clear down to the stage. These seats were all entered from the dress circle, and cost the same price: one dollar. They were "well-stuffed sofas of luxurious width and inclination, leaving ample room between them for the 'largest liberty' of the feet." One writer contrasted the "personal comfort and luxury" with the Park Theatre's "system of torture applied to legs and arms" and "old fashioned filth, darkness and discomfort", adding, "all that is over".

The family circle (second tier) cost 50 cents and had 13 rows of benches. The third tier had "upper boxes", for which seats cost 50 cents, and the gallery, which cost 25 cents and had 20 rows of benches plus three additional rows, in the back, for African-American customers. The third tier included an unconnected female section with a separate entrance, on Anthony Street; the rest was for males. A newspaper editorial published October 2, 1847, addressed this arrangement in the context of sexual activity in theaters.

(On October 18, 1847, prices for the upper boxes and gallery were reduced by half. On January 10, 1848, prices for the rest of the house were reduced by half, as well.)

A large reservoir on the top of the building held a hundred tons of water, in case of fire.

== Performers and performances ==
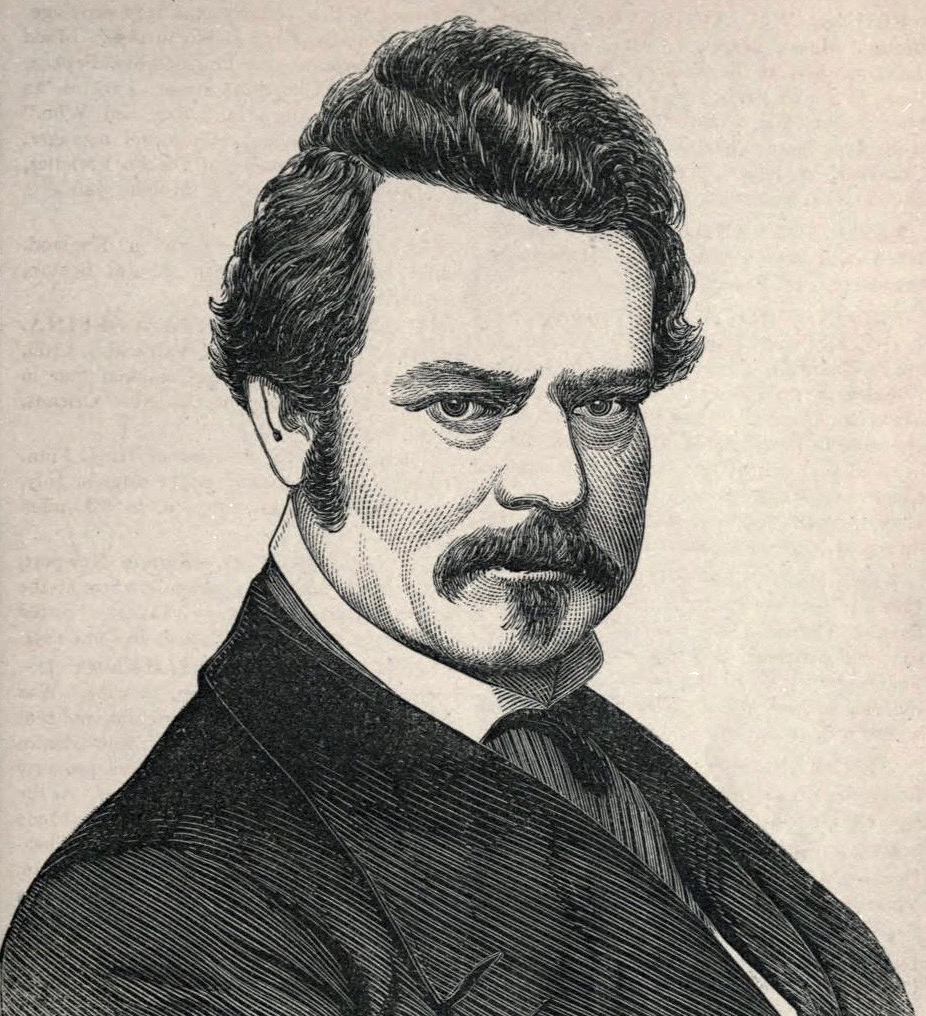
Edwin Forrest

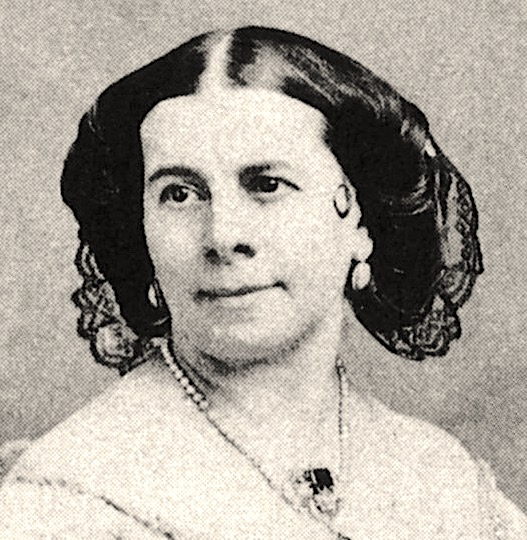
Anna Bishop

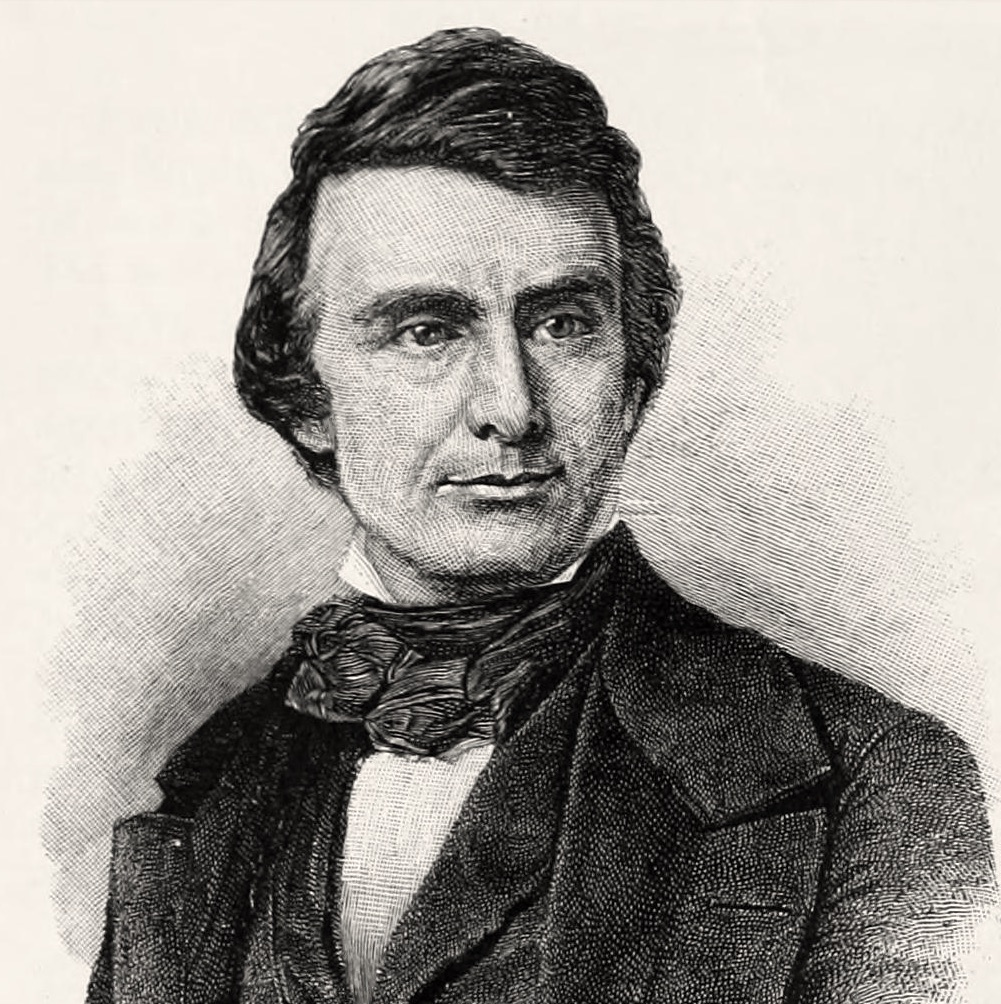
James E. Murdoch

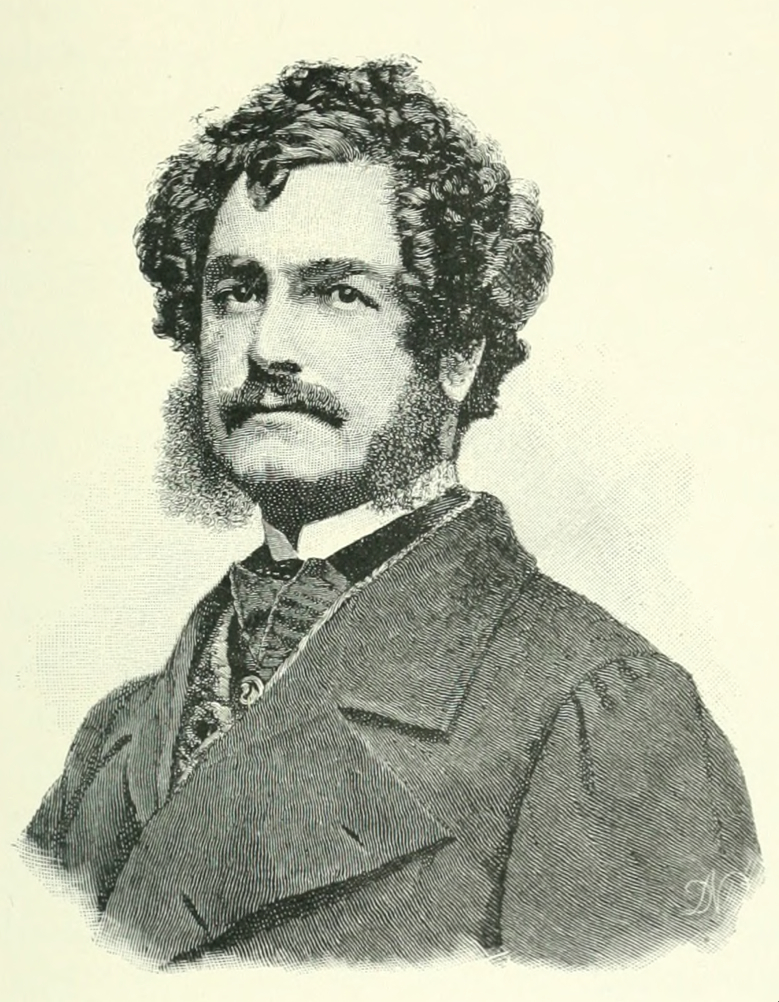
Lester Wallack

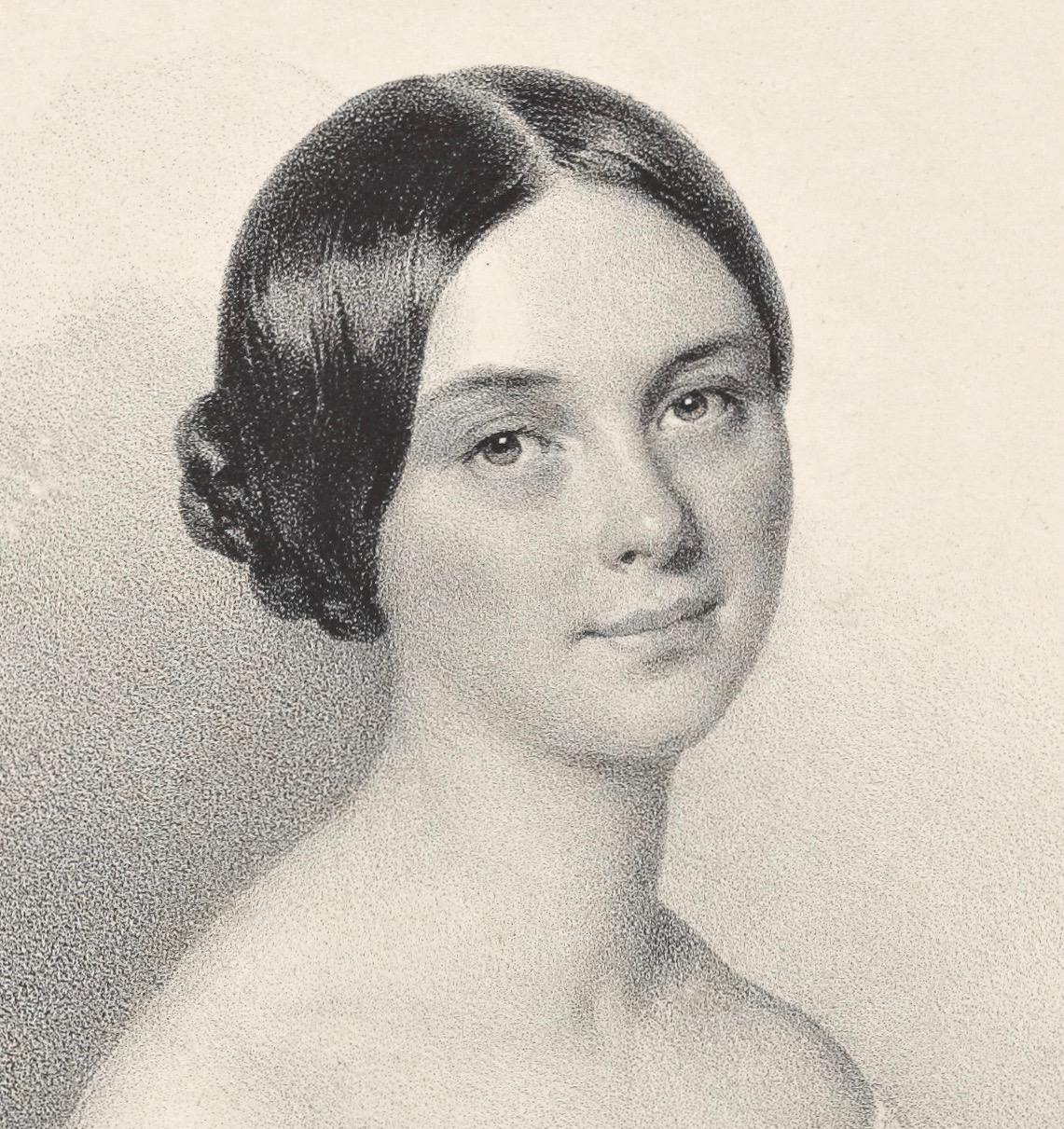
Hermine Blangy

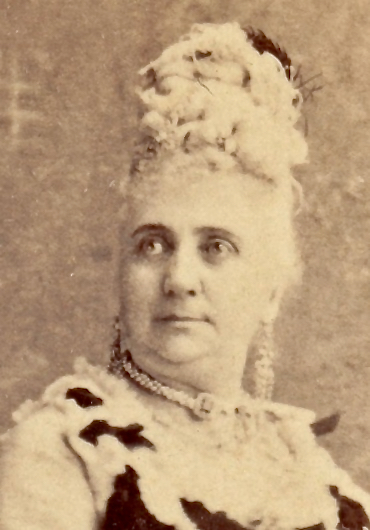
Fanny Morant

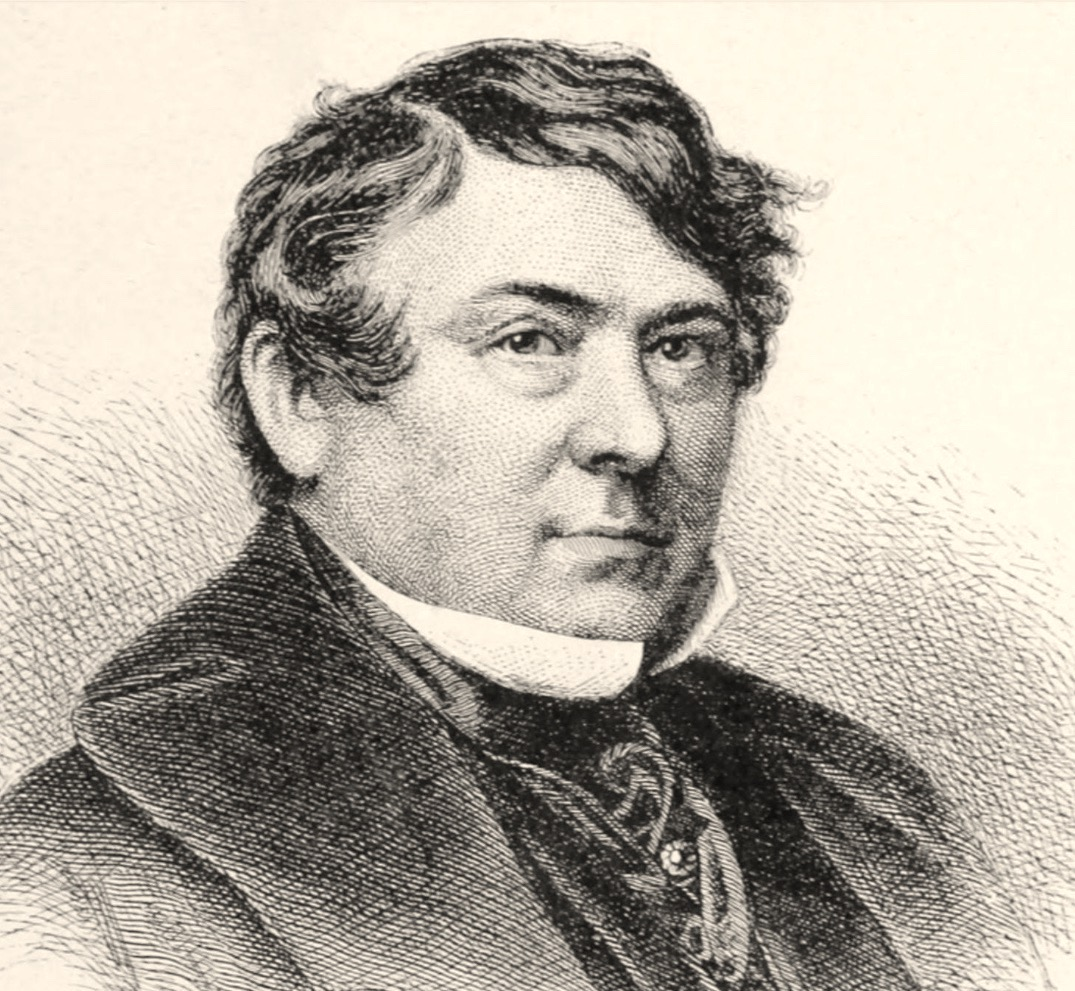
William Rufus Blake

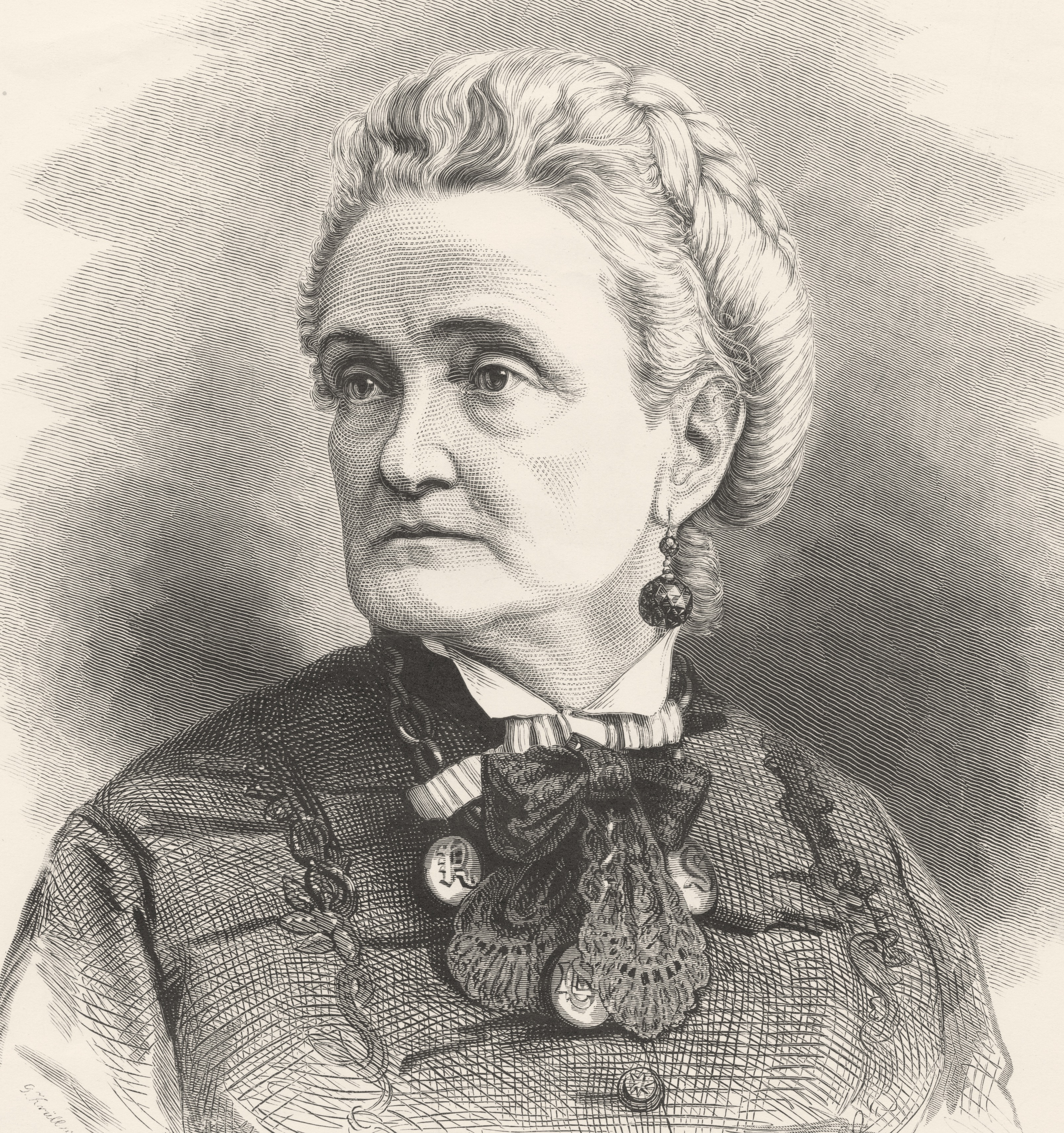
Charlotte Cushman

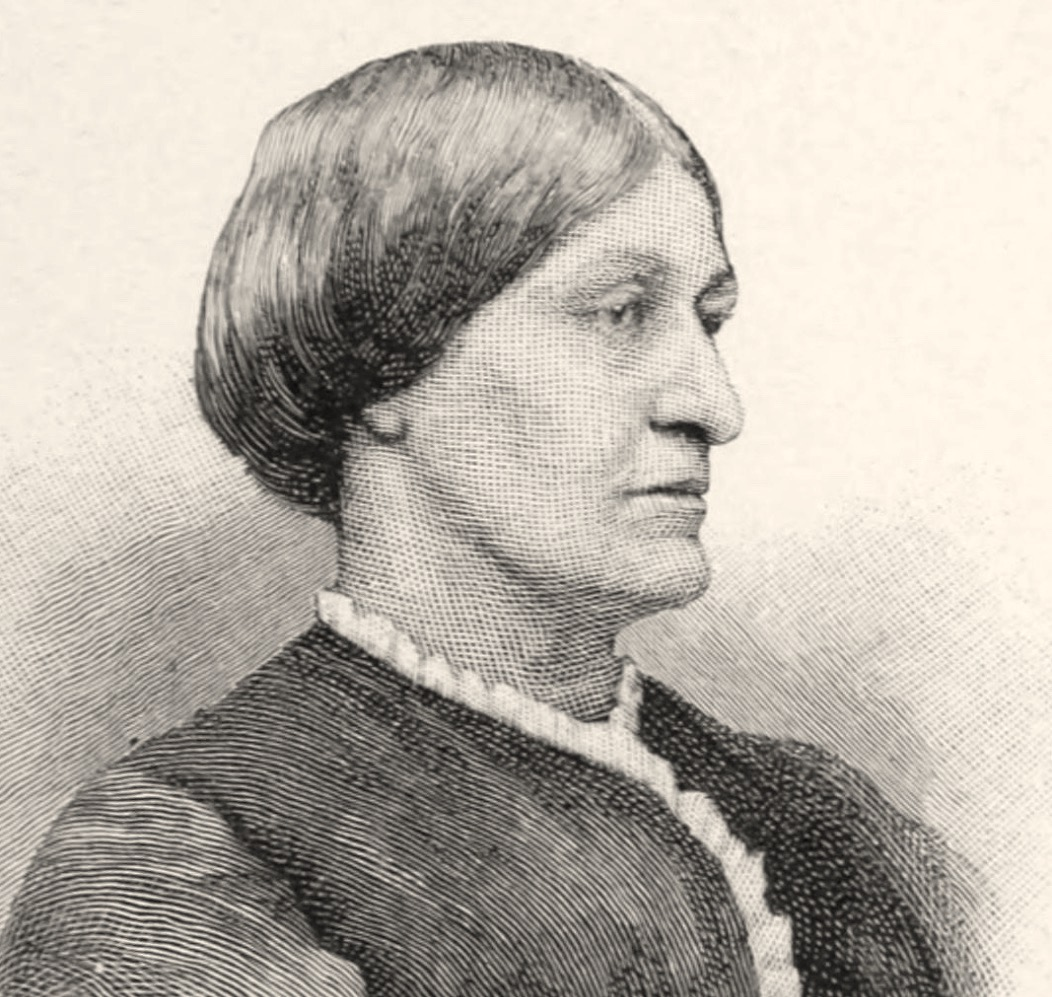
Mrs. James W. Wallack Jr.

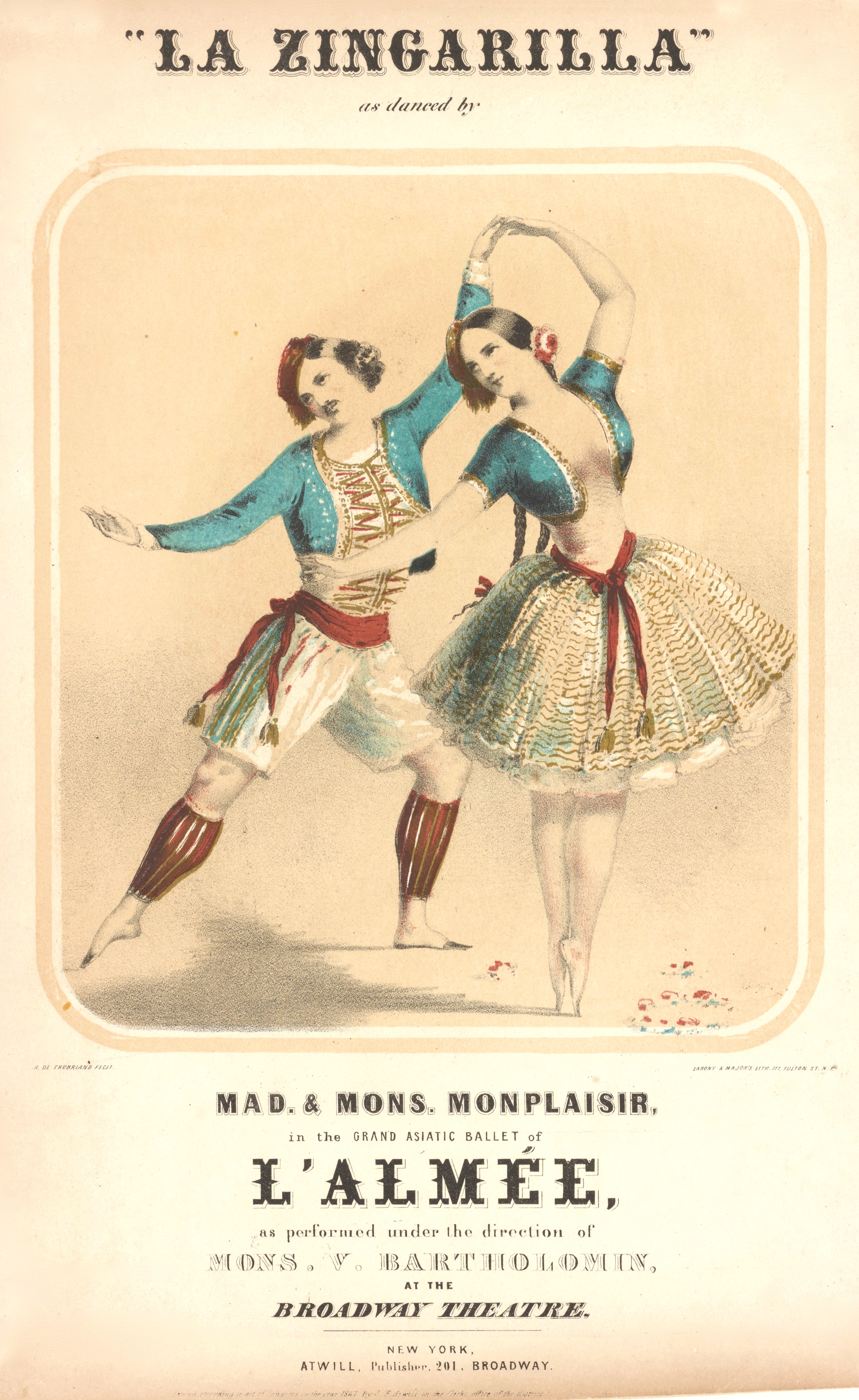
Adèle and Hippolyte Monplaisir

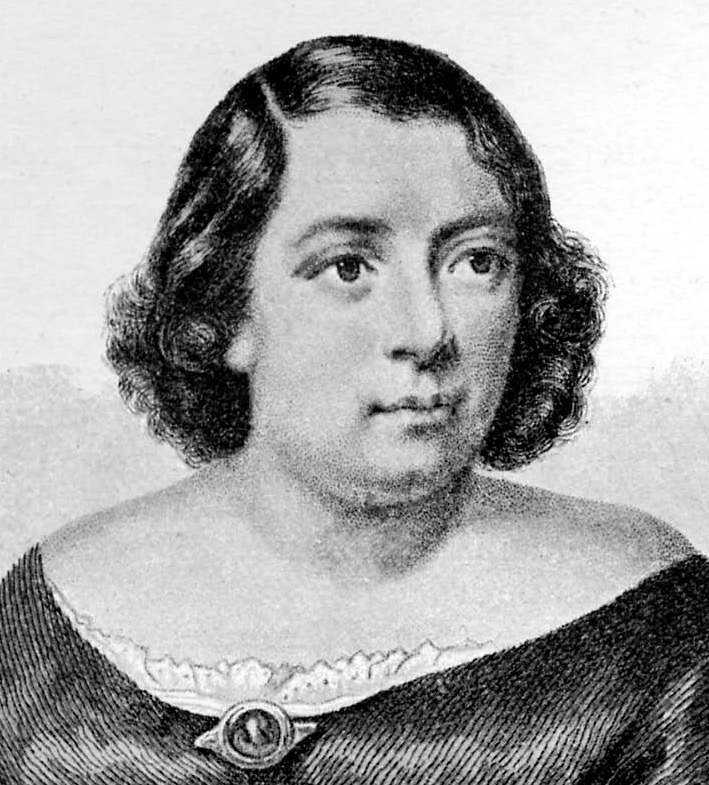
Marietta Alboni

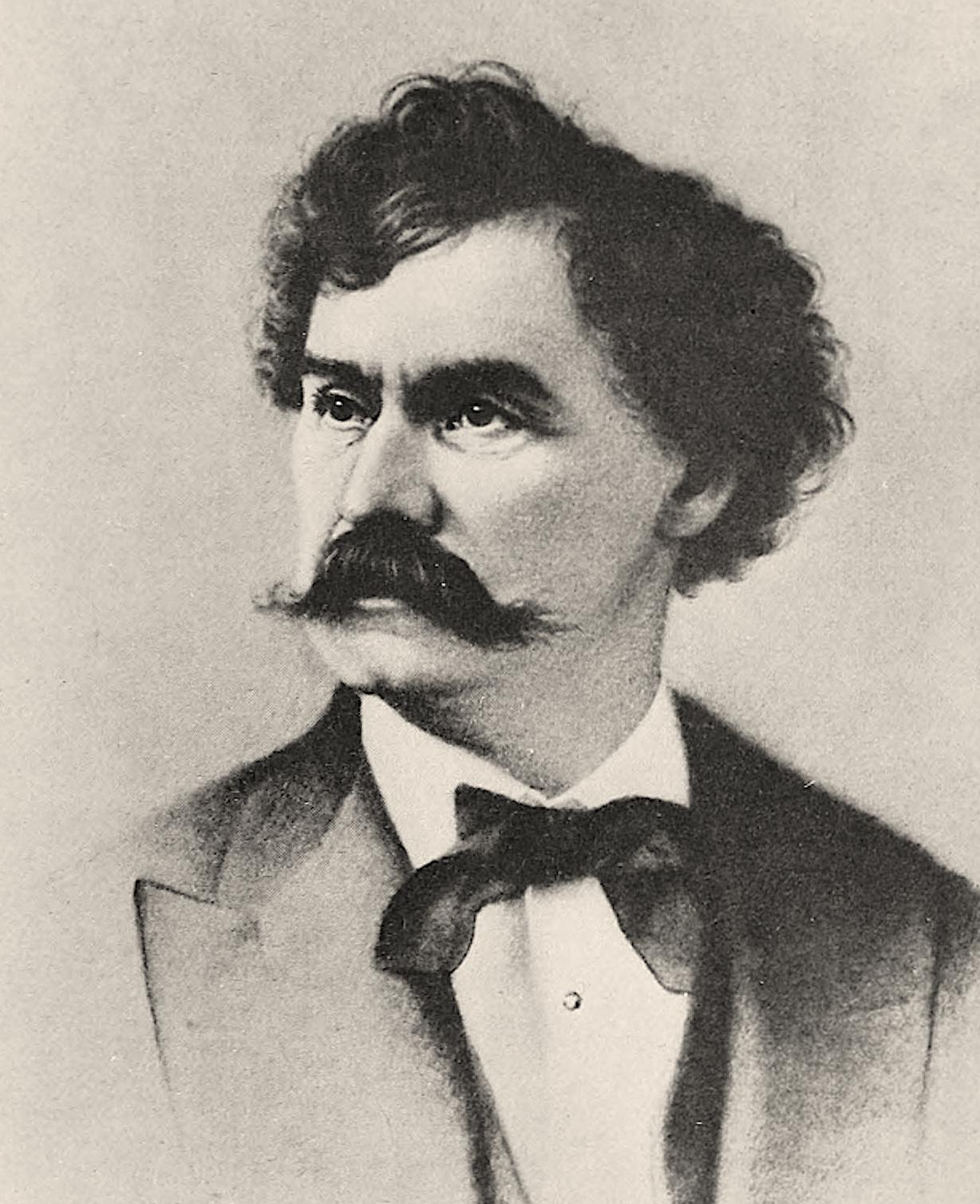
James W. Wallack Jr.

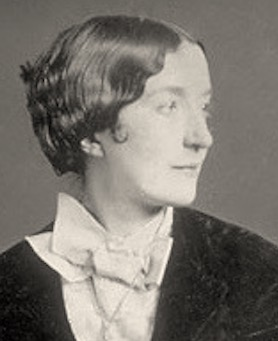
Jean Margaret Davenport

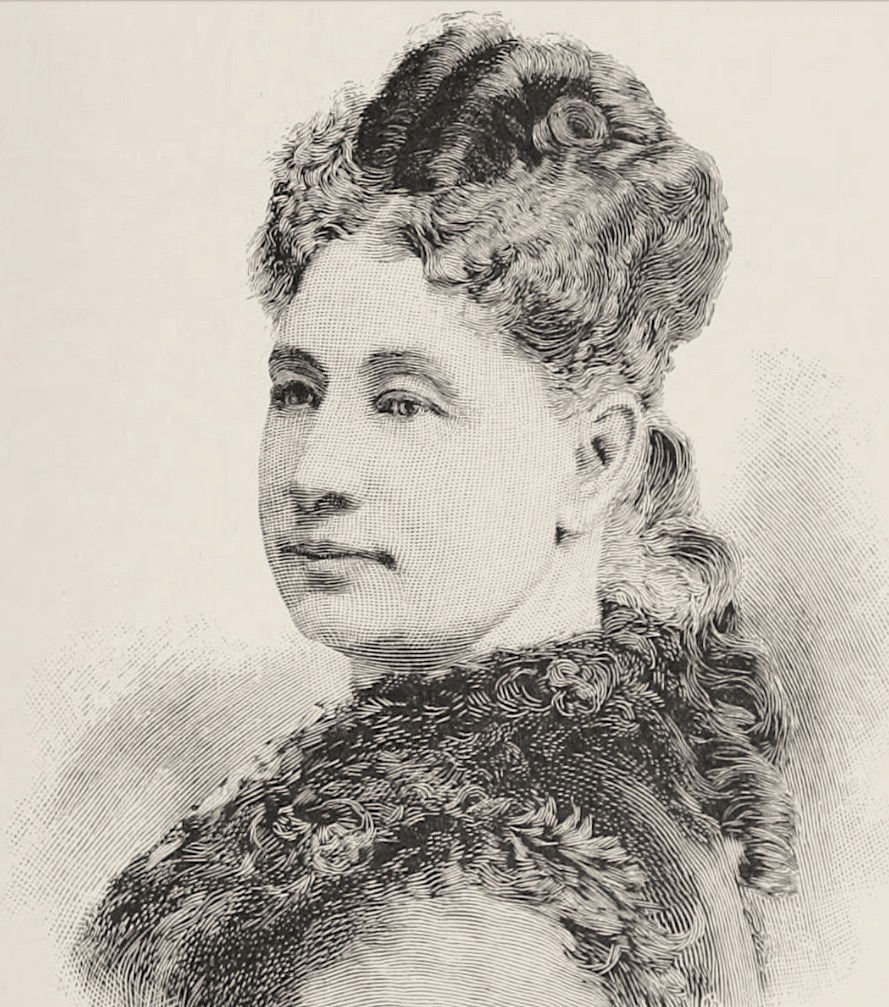
Mrs. Barney Williams

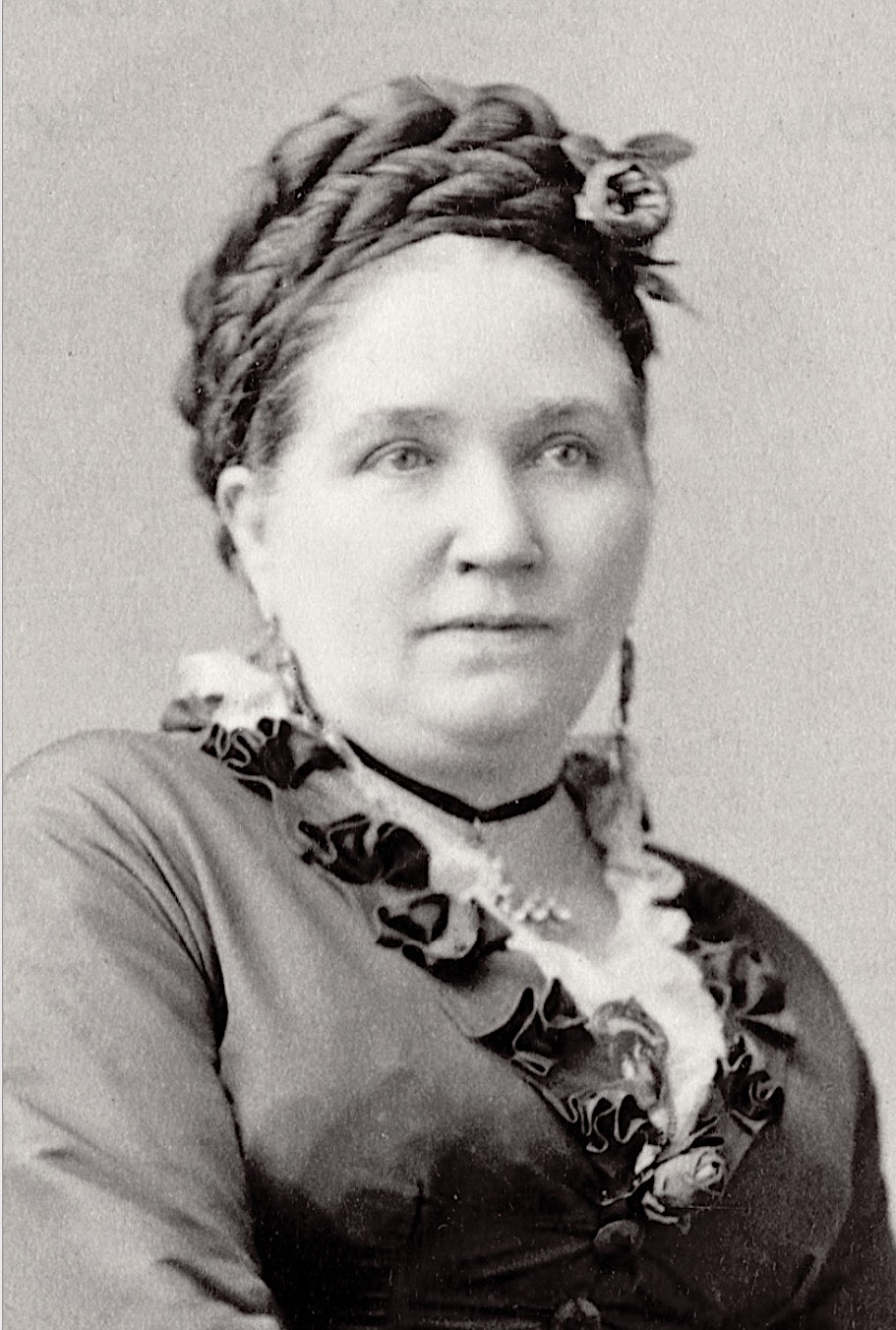
Madame Ponisi

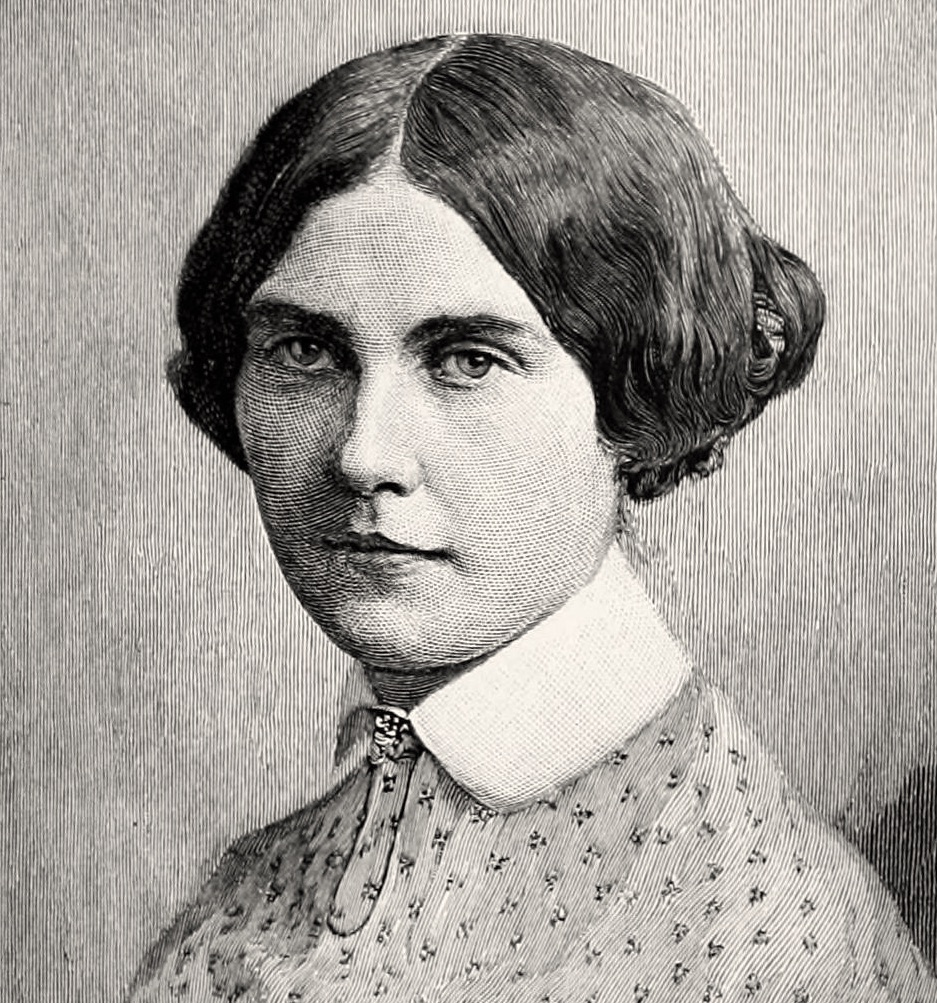
Julia Dean

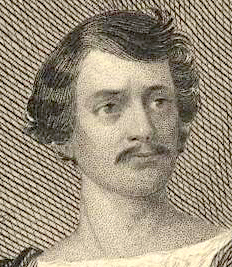
Edward Eddy

As at other theaters, the resident stock company presented familiar plays in repertory, with guest stars – touring actors – playing the leading roles during engagements of one or more weeks. Sometimes a new play or special production had a run of consecutive performances. A bill opened with an overture by the house orchestra and comprised a full-length play plus a curtain-raiser or afterpiece, and perhaps another musical, dance, or specialty act, as well. Sometimes the main piece was an opera or ballet by a guest troupe. Summers the company was off, and the house was rented to touring acts. The performers who played the Broadway were the same as those who played the city's other theaters, such as the Park, the Bowery, Niblo's Garden, and the Academy of Music.

=== 1847–50 ===
The first season began September 27, 1847, with The School for Scandal. Lester Wallack made his American debut (using the name John Lester) in the afterpiece, Used Up. The company also presented Love's Sacrifice, The Rivals, Temper (a new comedy by Robert Bell), Money, Buckstone's Flowers of the Forest, Ernestine, George Barnwell, She Would Be a Soldier, Robert Macaire, Old Heads and Young Hearts, and London Assurance, the last two starring Blake. Thomas Talfourd's new play, Glencoe, and H. P. Grattan's new drama, Advocate, were also produced. Short pieces included Ladies, Beware; The Jacobite; Thomas Haynes Bayly's Ladder of Love; Captain of the Watch; Box and Cox; and a new farce, Young America.

Guest actors included James E. Murdoch in Hamlet and The Lady of Lyons, Samuel Lover in his own play, Emigrant's Dream, Mrs. George Percy Farren (née Mary Ann Russell) in The Stranger, The Gamester, and The Ransom, Mr. and Mrs. James W. Wallack Jr. in Macbeth with guest actor James Stark, W. B. Chapman, James Robertson Anderson in Othello and Romeo and Juliet. John Brougham's comedy, Romance and Reality, starring the author, was a big hit and ran two weeks, as did John Collins, the Irish singer and actor.

Professor Risley & Sons, a popular gymnastics act, was on the bill for two weeks in October. The popular Italian ballerina Giovanna Ciocca, with Gaetano Morra, played two weeks. The French Ballet Company directed by Victor Bartholomin and featuring Hippolyte Monplaisir and his wife Adèle Monplaisir was on the bill from October 21 to November 29. Another French ballet company played April 3 – 15, starring Mlle. Hermine Blangy, with Mons. Bouxary, in L'Illusion d'un Peintre and Giselle. Anna Bishop's Dramatic Company presented Lucrezia Borgia in Italian and Linda of Chamouni in English. The Monplaisirs returned on July 6 for four weeks (sans Bartholomin), presenting the ballets L'Almee and Le Diable a Quatre.

The stock company was not successful the first season; audiences were meager and the press critical.

Edwin Forrest opened the second season August 28, 1848, in Othello. He played a total of eight weeks over three engagements during the season, in the roles of Macbeth, Virginius, Richelieu, Damon in Damon and Pythias, and Spartacus in The Gladiator. Ann Childe Seguin and her husband Edward Seguin, singers of opera in English, performed October 11 – 24, and performed The Enchantress by Michael William Balfe for 20 nights beginning March 30. December 4 – 9 General Tom Thumb acted in Hop o' My Thumb, or the Seven League Boots, written especially for him. On Christmas night, Lester Wallack (John Lester) played the title part in the premiere of The Count of Monte Cristo, adapted by G. H. Andrews for this theatre, the first dramatization of the Alexandre Dumas novel to be performed in America. It ran 50 nights (dress circle and parquette raised to 75 cents), and was revived May 14–23, 1849. Henry Placide played March 5 – 24; with John Collins from March 12. April 18 – 21 James Henry Hackett played Falstaff in Henry IV. The Monplaisir Ballet Company ran May 28 – June 23, which ended the season. There followed a summer engagement of Italian opera, and ballet featuring Mlle. Blangy, August 13 – September 15.

The third season opened September 17, 1849, with Blake as acting and stage manager. James Hudson made his American debut, performing six weeks during the season. Charles Walter Couldock also made his American debut, appearing with Charlotte Cushman a total of six weeks. John Collins played five weeks. The Seguin troupe played two weeks. Mrs. George Barrett appeared 14 nights. Ellen and Kate Bateman, four and six years of age, respectively, made their first appearance in New York; they played a week, as did each of Murdoch, Hackett, and McKean Buchanan. Extremes, a new comedy, was played for a month beginning February 25. Barrett returned as manager on March 21, after a grand benefit March 20 for Blake, who left the company at the end of the week. May 1 – 11, Mrs. Farren appeared. May 13 Jean Margaret Davenport appeared as Evadne, sharing a bill with dancers Giovanna Ciocca and Gaetano Neri in a new ballet, The Magic Flute. Her engagement ended May 25. July 4–6, 1850, Madame Augusta's production of the ballet Nathalie, and Felix Carlo and family, pantomimists and gymnasts, formed a bill, closing the season.

=== 1850–53 ===
The fourth season opened August 19, 1850, with Barrett as stage manager, and the American debuts of William Davidge, Frederick B. Conway, and Henry Scharf, and Sarah Anderton. During the season, Conway played opposite Cushman in The Stranger and other plays, and also appeared in The School for Scandal, Morton's All That Glitters is Not Gold, Douglas Jerrold's comedy Retired From Business, a new drama called Presented at Court, James Planché's A Day of Reckoning, a French drama called Belphœger, a new spectacle from the French called Azael, the Prodigal, The Husband of My Heart, The Idol of My Heart, G. H. Boker's The Betrothal, and Sullivan's Old Love and New. Playing opposite Conway in the last four was Madame Ponisi (Mrs. Elizabeth Wallis), who made her New York debut November 11, as Lady Teazle in The School for Scandal, and was so successful that she was at once given "leading business". She held that position almost continuously until the house was closed. September 2 – 7 Anna Bishop presented Judith. Collins played three weeks in two engagements. Sir William Don's American debut was September 28; he played for two weeks. December 16 – 28 brought a ballet troupe, Celestine and Victorine Franck with Messrs. Espinosa and Gredelue. April 7, 1851, Vision of the Sun was revived; it starred Miss Anderton and ran five weeks. June 23 saw Cushman as Lady Macbeth. The season ended July 12.

Marshall's friends arranged a benefit for him at Castle Garden, August 12, 1851. It lasted from morning until late at night, and ticket-holders could leave and reenter at will. The next day, the report of this remarkable event took up two and one half columns in the New York Herald.

Its interior entirely remodeled and renovated—the parquet enlarged to more than double its original size, the lower tier of boxes rebuilt, new gas fixtures introduced throughout the building, and a new stage laid, among other alterations before and behind the curtain—the Broadway Theatre opened for its fifth season on August 27, 1851, with Thomas Barry, formerly of the Park Theatre, as stage manager. The company played a week and a half of mixed bills including ballet by the Rousset Family, who danced Les Fees, Catarina, and the first act of Giselle. Forrest appeared fifteen weeks over three engagements this season, performing King Lear, Jack Cade, and Metamora, in addition to his other roles. Madame Céleste played seven weeks in two engagements: in St. Mary's Eve and a new drama, The Queen's Secret; as Miami in The Green Bushes, Cynthia in The Flowers of the Forest, and Mazourka in Taming a Tartar; and as the French Spy, Naramattah, Marie Ducange, and the Cabin Boy. She also appeared opposite Conway in Boucicault's The Willow Copse. On June 7, Mr. and Mrs. Seguin and Mr. T. Bishop appeared with her in La Bayadare. Collins appeared five weeks over two engagements, in Edward Fitzball's version of Paul Clifford; in a new play by C. P. T. Ware, The Irish Genius; and as Sir Patrick O'Plenipo. Starting December 1 Ingomar the Barbarian was produced for one week, featuring Ponisi and Conway. Lola Montez, Countess of Landsfeld, opened December 29, 1851 for three weeks in the ballet Betley, the Tyrolean. On May 18 she returned for two weeks in Lola Montes in Bavaria, by C. P. T. Ware, in which she played herself. Mr. and Mrs. Barney Williams made their first appearance at this house June 21, 1852, running until July 7, 1852, on which date Forrest also appeared, in Jack Cade, and the season ended.

The sixth season opened August 30, 1852 with The Hunchback by James Sheridan Knowles, in which Julia Dean made her first appearance at this theater. Collins arrived for two weeks, one of them with the Bateman Children in The Young Couple and The Spoiled Child. Forrest began five weeks on September 20, followed by Mr. and Mrs. Barney Williams for one week. November 1, Ingomar, the Barbarian with Dean and Conway. November 8, The Duke's Wager, by Mrs. Kemble Butler, with Dean, Ponisi, and Conway. November 15, a new petite drama by the Brothers Mayhew, with the Bateman Children and their father. November 29, Mrs. Mowatt for two weeks, who played Parthenia in Ingomar, Blanche in her play Armand, Rosalind, Mrs. Haller, Ion, and Martha Gibbs, and the title character in Anne Blake, the Poor Dependent, by John Westland Marston. Nine weeks of opera began December 13, 1852, with the world premiere of the opera The Peri with words by S. J. Burr and music by James Gaspard Maeder (1809–1876), featuring Mr. Bishop, Caroline Richings, Ponisi, and Davidge. It was performed twelve times. December 27, La Cenerentola with Marietta Alboni performing for the first time in New York City, supported by Signors Sangiovanni, Rovere, and Barili. Alboni appeared as Norma, Amina, Rosina, and Marie in Child of the Regiment, through January 28, 1853. February 14 for the first time in America, Jerrold's comedy St. Cupid was presented. February 24, Forrest acted Othello. His engagement was interrupted by illness, and on the 28th, The White Slave of England was produced, with Ponisi, Conway, Barry, and Mrs. Vernon. March 7, Forrest resumed, as Jack Cade. April 26, a new comedietta by Charles Mathews (the younger) called Little Toddlekins was given, with Davidge and Mrs. Vernon. On May 2 a new and lavish production of Macbeth opened, with Forrest, Conway, and Ponisi; it played 20 nights. The season closed July 18, 1853. The summer season by the Williamses (July 4 – August 6) was very successful.

=== 1853–56 ===
The seventh season opened August 15, 1853, with Forest Rose, by Samuel Woodworth. The Williamses played eight weeks over four engagements, with constantly increasing popularity; their repertory included Shandy Maguire. Julia Dean played six weeks over three engagements, including Isabel and Boker's drama Leonora di Guzman, both with Ponisi and Conway. Forrest played eight weeks in two engagements, performing in Hamlet and The Merchant of Venice, among other plays. J. R. Anderson played six weeks over two engagements, in Hamlet, The Lady of Lyons, Ingomar, Othello, Richard III, John H. Wilkins' Civilization, King Lear, Rev. James White's The King of the Commons, Macbeth, Gerald Griffin's Gisippus, and The Robbers. On November 1, he played Charles in The Elder Brother and Delaval in Matrimony, for the American debut of Fanny Morant. On November 28, Miss Davenport began a two-week engagement which included Adrienne, the Actress, Camille, and the Countess in Love. Collins played December 12, as Major Bagnal O'Daly and Paddy Murphy. On January 23, 1854, Sterling Coyne's comedy The Hope of the Family began, with The Cataract of the Ganges, playing a six-week run. On February 6 a lavish new production of A Midsummer Night's Dream began a run which ended March 11. (It competed with a production of the same play at Burton's Theatre, running at the same time.) May 29 began three weeks of Faustus, with Charles Pope and Ponisi and Conway. The season closed July 8, 1854. (Putnam's Monthly disdained the building, its management, and its audience in a February 1854 article.)

The eighth season opened August 21, 1854, with Barrett as stage manager, replacing Mr. Barry. Miss Davenport played two engagements totaling four weeks, in Camille and Adrienne and opposite Conway in both Ingomar and Evadne. E. L. Davenport played five weeks, two of them with his wife, Fanny Vining, who made her American debut (opposite her husband) March 2 in Love's Sacrifice. He performed as Richard III, Brutus, Rolla in Pizarro, Hercule in Civilization, St. Pierre in James Sheridan Knowles' The Wife, and William in Black-Eyed Susan, and in two plays by J. H. Wilkins, The Egyptian, and St. Marc, the latter with Ponisi and Conway. Vining played opposite her husband in Hamlet, The Lady of Lyons, Othello, Much Ado About Nothing, and W. Robson's Love and Loyalty. She also played a week without him, opposite Conway, in Romeo and Juliet, The Love Chase, and a new comedy called Charity's Love. A double bill of A New Way to Pay Old Debts (Davenport only), and Charity's Love (Vining and Conway) closed their engagement on May 26. Forrest appeared nine weeks in two engagements, performing in Pizarro, Brutus, The Lady of Lyons, and Coriolanus, among his other roles. William Harrison and Louisa Pyne performed twelve and a half weeks of opera, including La sonnambula, The Bohemian Girl, William Vincent Wallace's Maritana, Fra Diavolo, The Crown Diamonds, The Beggars' Opera, Guy Mannering, The Enchantress, and Cinderella. Agnes Robertson played three weeks, in The Maid With the Milking Pail, The Young Actress, and Asmodeus, as Carlo. She also appeared as Andy Blake, Don Leander, the Fairy Star, and Bob Nettles. Her husband, Dion Boucicault, appeared with her the last week. A Midsummer Night's Dream was revived for one week. Eloise Bridges began a two-week run March 12. The season ended on June 2, 1855. There followed summer seasons by Mr. and Mrs. Barney Williams (June 25 – July 31) and Gabriel Ravel et al. (August 6 – September 15).

The ninth season opened September 17, 1855, with Blake as stage director. Opening night featured E. L. Davenport in 'Richard III, with Charles Fisher as Richmond. King Charming opened Christmas Eve, 1855, and Sea of Ice was added to the bill January 14. These extravaganzas closed January 26. J. W. Wallack Jr. played January 28 – February 6, including the New York premiere of Leon, or The Iron Mask, an historical play by William Bayle Bernard, with Ponisi and Fisher in the cast. Wallack also acted in Romeo and Juliet, The Stranger, Love's Sacrifice, and The Lady of Lyons, opposite Jane Coombs. King Charming played again February 7 – 15. On February 18, the equestrian dramatic spectacle Herne, the Hunter, adapted by Mr. N. B. Clarke from an historical romance by William Harrison Ainsworth, began a three-week run, with a stud of horses from Nixon & Myers. This was followed on March 10 by The Cataract of the Ganges for one week, and then Timour the Tartar was added to the bill (with The Cataract of the Ganges) for one week. Finally, a week of Mazeppa was given, ending the six-week equestrian run. The Keller Company, famous for their stage tableaux, appeared for two weeks beginning March 31. The Williamses played seven weeks, April 14 – May 31, followed by three weeks of the stock company, ending the season on June 21, 1856.

=== 1856–59 ===
By that time, the fashionable residential, hotel, and theater district was moving northward, to the area of Union Square. Simultaneously, the city's burgeoning wholesale dry goods trade was expanding northward along Broadway from downtown, transforming the neighborhood of the Broadway Theatre.

Owing to excavation for a new dry goods warehouse adjoining the Broadway Theatre on the south, its walls were dangerously undermined and new foundations were needed beneath them. The theater was therefore not ready to open for its tenth season (1856–57) until December 22, 1856.

The opening performance was The Lady of Lyons with Claude Melnotte played by Henry Loraine, an English provincial actor making his American debut, as a guest. He played leading parts in repertory eight nights. December 29 – January 22, a German opera troupe, starring soprano Bertha Johannsen and conducted by Carl Bergman, with Theodore Thomas as concertmaster, gave twelve performances, including Fidelio, Der Freischütz, Martha, The Child of the Regiment, Czar and Carpenter, and Daniel Auber's The Mason and Locksmith. Ticket prices were increased for the opera: one dollar for dress circle and a newly railed-off portion of the parquet. Forrest performed 23 nights, playing Sheridan Knowles' William Tell in addition to his other roles. The rest of his announced performances were canceled owing to his indisposition. January 26 – February 13, Gabriel and Francois Ravel, along with Mlle. Yrca Matthias, the Martinetti family, and a pantomime and ballet corps, performed eleven times. Ponisi played Romeo to Mrs. Lizzie Weston Davenport's Juliet. Monday, March 16, saw the premiere of the "grand dramatic Eastern spectacular drama" The Usurper of Siam, with Sands, Nathans & Co.'s trained elephants, Victoria and Albert. The week of Monday March 30 – April 4, the elephants appeared in a "Grand Divertisement" on a bill with a drama and a farce by the stock company. April 6 – 17, The Last Days of Pompeii was given, including the eruption of Mount Vesuvius. April 20, Mr. and Mrs. E. L. Davenport began an engagement with a new tragedy, De Soto, by the American playwright, George Henry Miles. The spectacle The Son of the Night played two weeks from May 4 through May 16, 1857. This was followed by a two-week revival (from November 1854) of the spectacle Faustus, which closed the (unprofitable) season on May 30, 1857. On June 3, a benefit was given to Marshall at the Academy of Music.

The eleventh season began September 14, 1857, when Mathews began a critically acclaimed run of six weeks in two engagements. The Ronzani Ballet Troupe performed October 6 – November 7. McKean Buchanan played one week. The theater was closed the week of December 7 to remodel its interior. When it reopened, on December 14, James M. Nixon was "equestrian director", R. White was "director of the arena", and Van Amburgh & Co. presented its "grand equestrian, zoological, and hippo-dramatic company". The Van Amburgh run closed March 31. On April 5, the house reverted to drama for a four-week engagement by Emma Waller and her husband, Daniel Waller. (The acting manager was N. L. Griffin and the stage manager F. C. Wemyss.) They closed May 1, 1858, and E. A. Marshall ended his association with the Broadway Theatre. It was then offered for nightly or weekly lease. A testimonial to Thomas D. Rice was held May 14, and a benefit for H. B. Phillips on May 22. Lola Montez lectured May 24 and continued for about two weeks, sometimes acting with A. W. Fenno.

The house was leased by Edward Eddy, a popular actor who had the previous season managed the Bowery Theatre, where he had acted since 1851. He made considerable alterations to the Broadway and reopened it for its twelfth season October 18, 1858. Fenno was stage manager. The prices were: dress circle, 50 cents; parquette and family circle, 25 cents; "a new and commodious amphitheatre, comprising the entire third and fourth tiers, capable of seating 2,000 persons, 12 cents". The opening play was The Lady of Lyons with Eddy opposite Julia Dean Hayne, who began an engagement of three weeks. Hackett played November 8 – 15, followed by Ponisi as Lady Macbeth, with Eddy as her husband. Barry Sullivan made his American debut November 22, playing various roles for one week. On November 29, Eddy presented the circus of Sands, Nathans & Co., which gave six weeks of ring performances, after which the company furnished the horses for a series of hippodramas: Putnam, the Iron Son of '76; Rookwood; Mazeppa; The Cataract of the Ganges; and Ivanhoe. Harry Pearson made his American debut on February 14, 1859, running one week, followed by Lucille and Helen Western, known as the Star Sisters, for two weeks.

== Closing and demolition ==
At some point Whiting had acquired ownership of the building. On February 28, a newspaper reported he had decided to replace the theatre with warehouses, beginning the work in April. A four-week run of Shakespeare's Antony and Cleopatra opened March 7, and the Broadway Theatre closed April 2, 1859.

Demolition began by April 11, and was already accomplished two months later. The new warehouses were completed by June 9, 1860.

In 1867 one writer summarized the theater's history this way:

By many it was anticipated that it would take the place of the old Park Theatre in public esteem, and that within its walls, as in times gone by, the wealthy, the fashionable, the intellectual, and the refined would seek their amusement and relaxation from the cares and fatigues of the day. These anticipations were not realized. It was never patronized by the best society as a body, and a career of ten years served to dissipate all the popularity it acquired in its earlier stages, while a year or two longer found it razed to the ground ... .
