= William Tell (1825 play) =

1825 play

- Original language: English
- Written by: James Sheridan Knowles
- Genre: Historical
- Setting: Switzerland, 14th century

Premiere
- Date: 11 May 1825
- Place: Theatre Royal, Drury Lane, London

William Tell is an 1825 historical play by the Irish writer James Sheridan Knowles. It portrays the legendary 14th-century Swiss folk hero William Tell in his battle against the Habsburg authorities.

It premiered at the Theatre Royal, Drury Lane in London. The original cast starred William Macready as Tell and included Thomas Archer, Henry Gattie, Edward Knight, Elizabeth Yates, Clara Fisher, Charles Mayne Young and Margaret Agnes Bunn. Knowles dedicated the play to the Spanish opposition leader General Francisco Mina, then living in exile in England.

The play was a success and established Knowles as the leading dramatist of the period. Revived frequently, it became a standard in both Britain and North America.

== Bibliography ==
- Lerg, Charlotte A. & Tóth, Heléna (ed.) Transatlantic Revolutionary Cultures, 1789-1861. BRILL, 2017.
