= George Lovell =

1847 novel

- 1852 edition
- Author: James Sheridan Knowles
- Language: English
- Publisher: Edward Moxton (London); Burgess, Stringer & Company (New York)
- Publication date: 1847
- Publication place: United Kingdom
- Media type: Print

George Lovell is an 1847 novel by the Irish writer James Sheridan Knowles, published in three volumes. Sheridan Knowles had made his name writing stages plays, particularly tragedies such as Caius Gracchus and Virginius. He then turned to writing novels this was the second following the semi-autobiographical Fortescue (1846). His second novel focused on a series of adventures experienced by the son of a jeweller. Some reviewers found the novels too earnest in their tone. Both enjoyed more success in the United States than in Britain. Charlotte Brontë mentions the novel in one of her letters.

== Bibliography ==
- Burwick, Frederick Goslee, Nancy Moore & Hoeveler Diane Long . The Encyclopedia of Romantic Literature. John Wiley & Sons, 2012.
- Gibson, Gertrude Gladys. James Sheridan Knowles and His Dramas. University of Iowa, 1930.
- Rollyson, Carl Edmund & Magill, Frank Northen. Critical Survey of Drama. Salem Press, 2003.
- Smith, Margaret (ed.) The Letters of Charlotte Brontë: 1848–1851. Clarendon, 1995
- Sutherland, John. The Longman Companion to Victorian Fiction. Routledge, 2014.
