= The Secretary (play) =

1842 play

- Original language: English
- Written by: James Sheridan Knowles
- Genre: Tragedy

Premiere
- Date: 24 April 1843
- Place: Theatre Royal, Drury Lane

The Secretary is a play by the Irish writer James Sheridan Knowles. It premiered at the Theatre Royal, Drury Lane on 24 April 1843. The cast included John Ryder as the King, George John Bennett as Duke of Gaveston, Samuel Phelps as Lord Byerdale, William Macready as Colonel Green, Charles Selby as Armstrong, Helena Faucit as Lady Laura Gaveston and Leonora Wigan as Emmeline.

== Bibliography ==
- Carlisle, Carol Jones. Helen Faucit: Fire and Ice on the Victorian Stage. Society for Theatre Research, 2000.
- Nicoll, Allardyce. A History of Early Nineteenth Century Drama 1800-1850. Cambridge University Press, 1930.
