= Old Maids =

1841 play

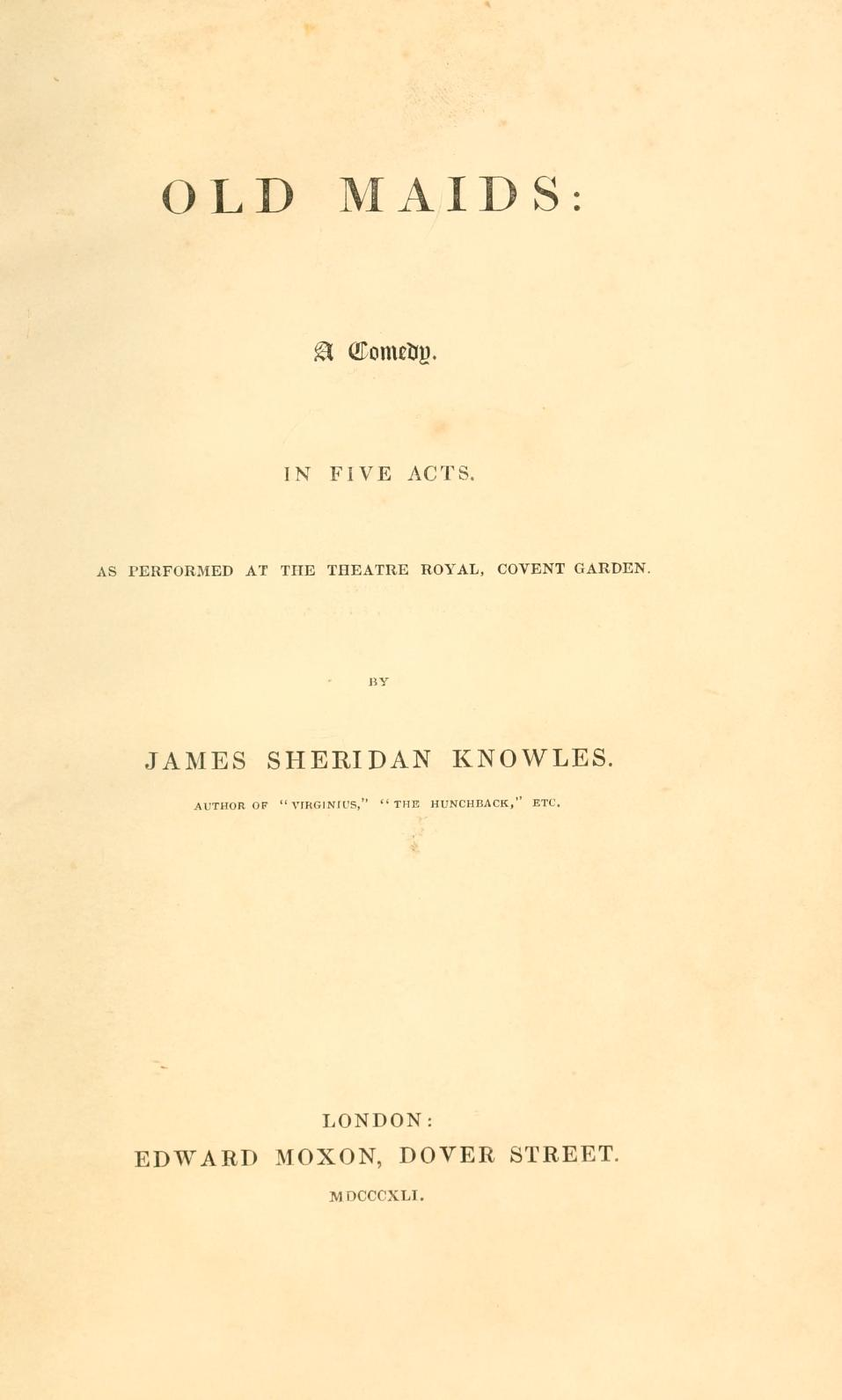
- Original language: English
- Written by: James Sheridan Knowles
- Genre: Comedy

Premiere
- Date: 12 October 1841
- Place: Theatre Royal, Covent Garden

Old Maids is an 1841 comedy play by the Irish writer James Sheridan Knowles. It was first staged at the Theatre Royal, Covent Garden in London on 12 October 1841. The cast included John Harley as John Blount, George Vandenhoff as Thomas Blount, Walter Lacy as Robert, Robert William Honner as Harris, William Payne as Stephen, Alfred Wigan as Jacob, Lucia Elizabeth Vestris as Lady Blance and Louisa Nisbett as Lady Anne. It was produced towards the end of the theatrical career of Sheridan Knowles, before he turned to novel-writing.

== Bibliography ==
- Burwick, Frederck Goslee, Nancy Moore & Hoeveler Diane Long . The Encyclopaedia of Romantic Literature. John Wiley & Sons, 2012.
- Nicoll, Allardyce. A History of Early Nineteenth Century Drama 1800-1850. Cambridge University Press, 1930.
- Walker, Hugh. The Literature of the Victorian Era. Cambridge University Press, 2011.
