= Gisippus =

1842 play

- Original language: English
- Written by: Gerald Griffin
- Genre: Tragedy
- Setting: Ancient Athens, Ancient Rome

Premiere
- Date: 23 February 1842
- Place: Theatre Royal, Drury Lane, London

Gisippus is an 1842 tragedy by the Irish writer Gerald Griffin. It premiered at the Theatre Royal, Drury Lane in London on 23 February 1842. It was staged posthumously as Griffin had died from typhus in 1840, and was likely written before 1838. The original cast included William Macready as Gisippus, James Robertson Anderson as Titus Quintus Fulvius, Edward Elton as Pheax, George Bennett as Lycias, Charles Selby as Macro and Helena Faucit as Sophronia. Its opening resembles William Shakespeare's Julius Caesar, but with the setting switched from Rome to Athens. The play was a popular success. It went on to appear in New York at the Park Theatre in 1847 and Broadway Theatre in 1848.

== Bibliography ==
- Cronin, John. Gerald Griffin (1803-1840). Cambridge University Press, 1978.
- Nicoll, Allardyce. A History of Early Nineteenth Century Drama 1800-1850. Cambridge University Press, 1930.
- Vance, Norman & Wallace, Jennifer (ed.) The Oxford History of Classical Reception in English Literature, Volume 4. Oxford University Press, 2012.
