= John Pritt Harley =

British actor (1786–1858)

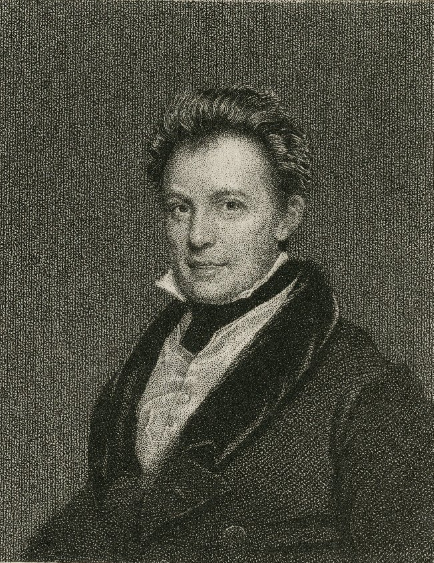
- Born: February 1786
- Died: 22 August 1858 (aged 72); London, England, British Empire
- Occupation: Actor

John Pritt Harley (February 1786 – 22 August 1858) was an English actor known for his comic acting and singing.

== Early years ==
Harley was the son of John Harley, a draper and silk mercer, and his wife Elizabeth. He was baptised in the parish church of St. Martin-in-the-Fields, London, on 5 March 1786. At the age of fifteen, he was apprenticed to a linendraper in Ludgate Hill. While there, he befriended William Oxberry, who later became a well-known actor. Together, they appeared in 1802 in amateur theatricals at the Berwick Street private theatre. Harley was next employed as a clerk to Windus & Holloway, attorneys, in Chancery Lane.

In 1806, and following years he acted in provincial theatres in England. At Southend, where he remained for some time, he acquired thorough training in his profession. He became popular for his comic singing, and being extremely thin, he became known as ‘Fat Jack.’ From 1812 to 1814 he was in the north of England. After this, obtaining an engagement from Samuel John Arnold, he came to London and made his first public appearance there on 15 July 1815 at the English Opera House as Marcelli in The Devil's Bridge. His reception was favourable, and in Mingle, Leatherhead, Rattle, and Pedrillo he increased his reputation as an actor and singer.

On 16 September 1815, Harley first appeared at the Theatre Royal, Drury Lane, as Lissardo in The Wonder. When John Bannister retired from the stage, Harley succeeded to his parts and created the new roles that would have fallen to Bannister. He played the comic heroes of all the operas. His voice was a counter-tenor, and he was known as a good musician, able to execute cadenzas with grace and effect. In 1816, when Every Man in his Humour was revived, starring Edmund Kean as Kitely, Harley played Bobadil, receiving enthusiastic notices. He also gained a reputation for his humorous portrayal of the Shakespearean clowns. Bannister, with whom he was friendly, when dying in 1836, gave him his Garrick mourning ring and his Shakespearean jubilee medal. Harley remained for twenty years at Drury Lane, with occasional summer excursions to the provinces and engagements at the Lyceum Theatre, where he for some time was stage-manager.

== Later years ==
In 1835, when Braham opened the St. James's Theatre, Harley joined the company at that house. Here in 1837 he played Samuel Pickwick in Mr. Pickwick. He soon returned to Drury Lane and was with William Macready at Covent Garden Theatre in 1838, and afterwards with Madame Vestris and Charles Mathews when they opened the same establishment two years later. Harley was back at Drury Lane from 1841 to 1848 with Alfred Bunn. In 1847, he created the role of James Cox in Box and Cox opposite J. B. Buckstone. When Charles Kean attempted to restore legitimate drama at the Princess's Theatre in 1850, Harley became a member of that company. He was master and treasurer of the Drury Lane Theatrical Fund after the retirement of Edmund Kean in 1833.

In 1858, while playing Lancelot Gobbo at the Princess's Theatre, Harley was struck with paralysis. He died two days later at his home in London. His last words were a quotation from A Midsummer Night's Dream: "I have an exposition of sleep come upon me." He was buried at Kensal Green cemetery on 28 August 1858. Although thought to be thrifty, he died penniless. He had a passion for collecting walking-sticks, canes, &c., and after his death more than three hundred varieties were included in the sale of his personal effects.

== Selected roles ==
- Hint in The Faro Table by John Tobin (1816)
- Paragon in The Touchstone by James Kenney (1817)
- Memme in Rugantino by Matthew Lewis (1820)
- Young Small in The Beggar's Daughter of Bethnal Green by James Sheridan Knowles (1828)
- Clever in Woman's Wit by James Sheridan Knowles (1838)
- John Blount in Old Maids by James Sheridan Knowles (1841)
