= Love (1839 play) =

1839 play

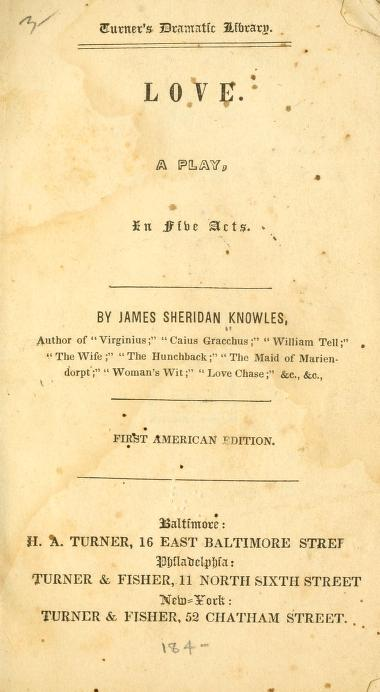
- 1840 American edition
- Original language: English
- Written by: James Sheridan Knowles
- Genre: Drama

Premiere
- Date: 4 November 1839
- Place: Theatre Royal, Covent Garden

Love (also known as The Countess and the Serf) is an 1839 play by the Irish writer James Sheridan Knowles. It premiered at the Theatre Royal, Covent Garden on 4 November 1839 with a cast that included Charles Selby as Prince Frederick, James Vining as Sir Rupert, Alfred Wigan as Sir Conrad, William Payne as Stephen, Ellen Tree as Countess, Emma Brougham as Empress and Lucia Elizabeth Vestris as Catherine. Knowles was paid six hundred pounds for the work by the management of Covent Garden. Mary Shelley praised the play for its "inspiring situations founded on sentiment and passion". It went on to enjoy success in the United States where it became part of the repertoire, being performed at the Broadway Theatre in New York many times in the 1850s. It was celebrated by abolitionists who cheered its anti-slavery theme of a serf falling in love with a countess despite her father's disapproval and the threat of execution.

== Bibliography ==
- Crook, Nora. Mary Shelley's Literary Lives and Other Writings. Taylor & Francis, 2022.
- Hughes, Amy. Spectacles of Reform: Theater and Activism in Nineteenth-Century America. University of Michigan Press, 2012.
- James, Henry. A Small Boy and Others: A Critical Edition. University of Virginia Press, 2011.
- Morash, Christopher. A History of Irish Theatre 1601-2000. Cambridge University Press, 2002.
- Nicoll, Allardyce. A History of Early Nineteenth Century Drama 1800-1850. Cambridge University Press, 1930.
