= The Beggar's Daughter of Bethnal Green =

1828 play

- 1834 edition
- Original language: English
- Written by: James Sheridan Knowles
- Genre: Comedy
- Setting: London, present day

Premiere
- Date: 22 November 1828
- Place: Theatre Royal, Drury Lane, London

The Beggar's Daughter of Bethnal Green is a five-act comedy play by the Irish writer James Sheridan Knowles. It was first staged at the Theatre Royal, Drury Lane in 1828 in London. It takes its name from a traditional popular song of the same name. On its opening night the audience began heckling in the second act, and by the third act, their dissatisfaction had become so tumultuous that the stage manager "implored a patient hearing, pledging himself that if the opinion of the audience was so decidedly against the piece at its conclusion, it should be withdrawn". The play was harshly criticised by the press for its weakness, lack of action, thinly sketched characters and lack of originality. In 1834 a revised version entitled The Beggar of Bethnal Green was staged at the Victoria Theatre. The action takes place in London and Romford, then in Essex.

The original Drury Lane cast included Charles Mayne Young, William Farren, John Pritt Harley, John Liston, Henry Gattie, Paul Bedford, Harriet Elizabeth Savill and Mary Ann Knight. Knowles dedicated the published version to the Scottish politician Kirkman Finlay.

== Bibliography ==
- Nicoll, Allardyce. A History of Early Nineteenth Century Drama 1800-1850. Cambridge University Press, 1930.
