= Richard Knowles =

Richard Knowles, Knolles or Knollys may refer to:

- Richard Knollys (died 1596) (1548–1596), MP
- Richard Knolles (c. 1540–1610), English historian
- Richard Brinsley Knowles (1820–1882), nineteenth-century British journalist
- Dick Knowles (1917–2008), British politician
- Richard T. Knowles (1916–2013), United States Army general
