= James Stark (actor) =

British-American actor (1819–1875)

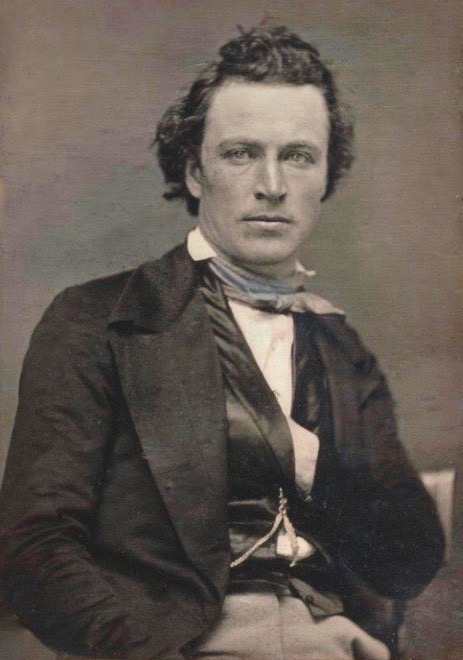
c. 1850

James Stark (1819 – October 12, 1875) was a Canadian-born American actor best known for appearances in tragedy.

Stark was born in Windsor, Nova Scotia, but his career was largely spent in California during pioneer days. Stark came west with the Gold Rush to first perform in Sacramento. With wife Sarah Kirby Stark, he brought the first successful dramatic season to San Francisco. He was particularly known for his portrayal of Cardinal Richelieu in the play of the same name, and for his portrayal of Hamlet and other Shakespearean characters.

Around 1848, he was a member of the stock company at the Richmond Theatre in Virginia.

In New York City, he played the Park Theatre in 1846 with John Collins in The Irish Ambassador, as Prince Rudolf; with Charles Kean and his wife, the former Ellen Tree, in The Two Gentlemen of Verona and King John; and with James Robertson Anderson in the new play King of the Commons. In 1848 and 1851 he played the Old Broadway Theatre, with Mr. and Mrs. J. W. Wallack Jr. In 1852 Frank Chanfrau was the manager of The New York Theatre, Astor Place (formerly the Astor Place Opera House) for one week, from September 27 to October 2, when Stark played King Lear, Hamlet, Richelieu, The Stranger, and Claude Melnotte (in The Lady of Lyons). In 1858 Mr. and Mrs. Stark performed for one week at Wallack's Theatre (485 Broadway), April 5 – 10, in The Gamester, The Lady of Lyons, Richelieu, Othello, Hamlet, and The Stranger.

From August 20 to September 8, 1866, when the same theater (485 Broadway), managed by George Wood, was called the Broadway Theatre, he acted in Richelieu, The Robbers, Napoleon (a new play), The Stranger, Katherine and Petrucio, The Lady of Lyons, Ingomar, and Pizarro, but the engagement was not profitable.

Stark spent much of his career in California, beginning in 1850 in Sacramento. Damon and Pythias, with a plot line reminding men of loyalty and responsibilities to friendship was portrayed by him for almost 20 years. As a pioneer actor, Stark brought the earliest legitimate drama to numerous towns in the west. He was also the first actor to pursue a political career in the West when he became a representative from Aurora, Nevada Territory to the first Nevada constitutional convention in 1863. Stark was also popular in Australia.

Stark's early death was foretold onstage as Stark portrayed Hamlet at Piper's Opera House in Virginia City, Nevada in 1869. He suffered a nosebleed on stage which was observed by the audience and indicated a series of strokes that left him paralyzed for months. He returned to New York City for the remainder of his life, only able to take minor roles. He died in New York City, in poverty and illness, aged 57 years.
