= John of Procida (play) =

1840 play

- Original language: English
- Written by: James Sheridan Knowles
- Genre: Tragedy
- Setting: Messina, 13th Century

Premiere
- Date: 19 September 1840
- Place: Covent Garden Theatre, London

John of Procida: The Bridals of Messina is an 1840 historical tragedy by the Irish writer James Sheridan Knowles. It is based on the life of the thirteenth century Italian physician and diplomat. It premiered at the Covent Garden Theatre in London.

== Bibliography ==
- Nicoll, Allardyce. A History of Early Nineteenth Century Drama 1800-1850. Cambridge University Press, 1930.
