= Thomas Archer (actor) =

English actor and dramatist

Thomas Archer (died 1848) was an English actor and dramatist.

== Acting ==
Archer was the son of a watchmaker. He made his first acting appearance at Drury Lane Theatre in 1823 as the King in the First Part of King Henry the Fourth. In the same season he played Appius Claudius in Virginius, Polixenes in the Winter's Tale, Gloucester in Jane Shore, Bassanio in the Merchant of Venice, and Claudio in Measure for Measure, in addition to other characters. He also took part in the melodramas of the Cataract of the Ganges and Kenilworth. He was the original representative of Opimius and Gesler in Sheridan Knowles' plays of Caius Gracchus (1823) and Willam Tell (1825).

Archer visited the United States and was engaged in the management of several theatres there. Later in his life he became a member of the English company of actors performing in Paris with Harriet Smithson. At a still later period he led a company to Belgium and Germany, and presented certain of Shakespeare's plays at Brussels, Antwerp, Colog, Aix-la-Chapelle, Frankfort, and Hamburg. He was again a member of the Drury Lane company, under the management of Mr. Hammond, in 1839, and in 1845, appearing at Covent Garden Theatre, then under the management of M. Laurent, as the blind seer in the tragedy of Antigone.

== Writing ==
Archer was also a playwright. He wrote several successful dramas and adaptations from the French, including the Black Doctor and the Little Devil. He also wrote one original play of historical interest, entitled Blood Royal, or the Crown Jewels. During the production of this play he commonly portrayed the hero, Colonel Blood.
