= Margaret Agnes Bunn =

British actress

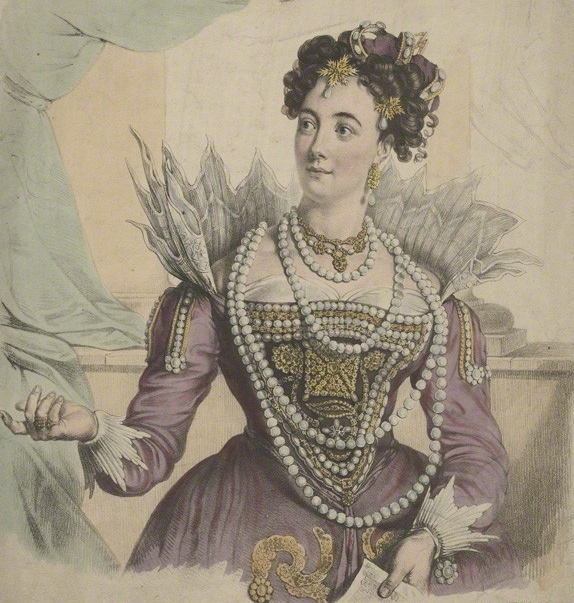
- Margaret Agnes Bunn as Queen Elizabeth in Kenilworth, 1823 or 1824
- Born: 26 October 1799; Lanark, Scotland
- Died: 1883 (aged 83–84)
- Occupation: Actress

Margaret Agnes Bunn (26 October 1799 – 1883) was a British actress.

== Early life ==
She was born Margaret Somerville in Lanark, Scotland in October 1799. Her father, John Somerville, was a biscuitmaker. The family lived in Marylebone. She attended Misses Trigge in Chelsea and Misses Curtess in Paddington. Her teachers and family took notice of her acting ability at a young age. In 1815, she met Douglas Kinnaird. She tried out for Belvidera and was rejected due to being "unequal to the character." She was asked to rehearse again, that same year, before Kinnaird and Lord Byron. Eventually, she made it to stage. On 9 May 1816 she made her first stage appearance in the tragedy Bertram. She played as Miss Somerville. She played that roll for three years.

== Mid-life and career ==
On 6 January 1818 she created the character Bianca, which was seen in the play Fazio, by Dean Milman. She eventually quit performing on Drury Lane. She moved onto appearing on Covent Garden, where she debuted Bianca on 22 October 1818. A few weeks later, on 9 November, she debuted as Alicia in Jane Shore. By 1819, she was performing in Birmingham. She met and married Alfred Bunn.

Her husband relocated to Drury Lane to create a management company for actors. She returned to the theater on Drury Lane on 27 October 1823, as Bianca. She also performed between 1823 and 1824 in Kenilworth, playing the debut role of Queen Elizabeth. She also as Herminone in The Winter's Tale, and debuted Cornelia in Sheridan Knowles Caius Gracchus.

== Later life and death ==
Bunn stopped performing by 1883. She died that year.
