= James Knowles (lexicographer) =

Irish schoolteacher

James Knowles (1759 – 8 February 1840) was an Irish schoolteacher and, late in life, the author of A Pronouncing and Explanatory Dictionary of the English Language. He was the father of the actor and dramatist James Sheridan Knowles.

== Life ==
Knowles was the youngest of three sons and one daughter of John Knowles of Dublin, and his wife Frances. Francis was a daughter of Thomas Sheridan, who was a schoolmaster and writer and friend of Jonathan Swift. Her brother, the actor and elocutionist Thomas Sheridan, father of the dramatist Richard Brinsley Sheridan, was the manager of the Smock Alley Theatre in Dublin, of which John Knowles was treasurer.

After the early death of John Knowles, James Knowles's education was directed by his uncle the actor Thomas Sheridan, who intended him for the church. This plan was abandoned when James, while on holiday in Cork, met Jane Daunt, a singer; she was a widow, and daughter of Andrew Peace, a medical practitioner of Cork. They married in 1780, and in the same year he established a school in Cork.

Two children of Knowles and his wife died in infancy; they went on to have a son, the dramatist James Sheridan Knowles, and two daughters. After his wife's death in 1800, he married a Miss Maxwell.

In 1793 Knowles, who was a liberal as well as a Protestant, signed a petition for Catholic emancipation, and a little later went bail for the editor of a liberal paper, who had been prosecuted at the instance of the government. His pupils, who were the sons of Protestant gentry, deserted him; he closed the school and moved to London, where, according to his son's account, he was helped by his first cousin, Richard Brinsley Sheridan, and set up a private school in Sidcup, Kent.

=== Belfast Academical Institution ===
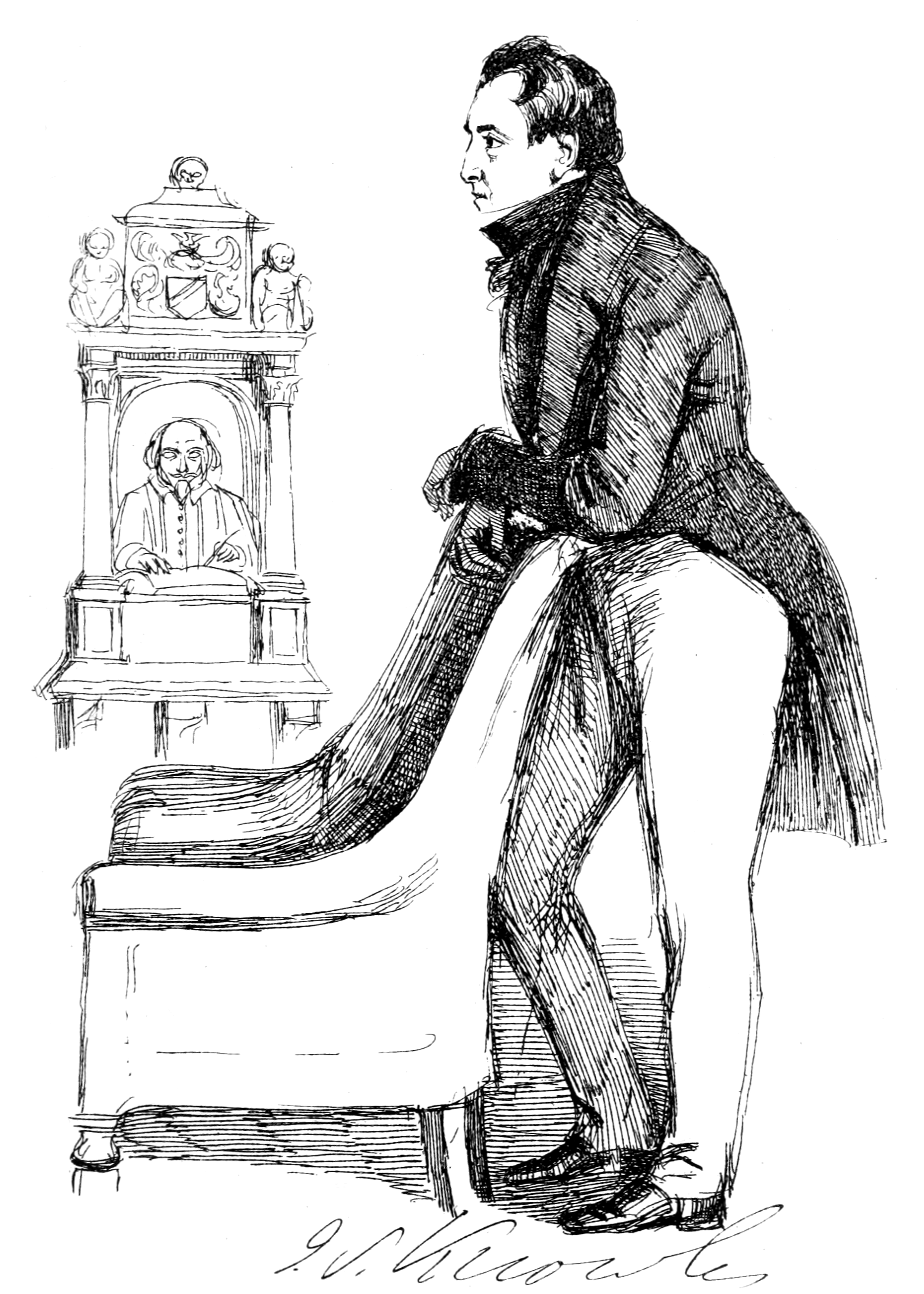
Knowles's son James Sheridan Knowles

He continued his career as a schoolmaster, and in 1813, mainly by his son's influence, he was appointed head of the English department at the Belfast Academical Institution, with his son as assistant. He and his son had strong differences of opinion about teaching methods, and in 1816 he was dismissed by the directors, on the ground of inability to maintain discipline. Knowles declined to be dismissed, and barricaded himself in his schoolmaster's house for several days; but eventually he gave way. In 1817 he published a pamphlet "An Appeal to the Dignified Visitors, and the Noblemen and Gentlemen, Proprietors", claiming that he had suffered injustice. Before leaving Belfast he received a testimonial from some of the leading citizens.

=== Compilation of dictionary ===
He returned to London, where he appears to have carried on his profession as "teacher of reading, elocution, grammar, and composition" for several years. In 1829 he seems to have joined his son in Glasgow, where he brought out a little book on Orthoëpy and Elocution. About this time, though he was now seventy and suffering from a painful disease, he began the compilation of a dictionary. This was published in London in 1835, entitled A Pronouncing and Explanatory Dictionary of the English Language, and dedicated to William IV. A dispute with the printer led to a protracted lawsuit, of which most of the expenses were borne by his son. Knowles died at his son's house, Alfred Place, Bedford Square, London, on 6 February 1840, and was buried at Highgate Cemetery.
