= The Daughter (play) =

1836 play

- Original language: English
- Written by: James Sheridan Knowles
- Genre: Melodrama
- Setting: Cornwall, England

Premiere
- Date: 29 November 1836
- Place: Theatre Royal, Drury Lane, London

The Daughter (also known as The Wrecker's Daughter) is an 1836 melodrama by the Irish writer James Sheridan Knowles. It premiered at the Theatre Royal, Drury Lane on 29 November 1836. The original cast included Sheridan Knowles himself as Martin, James Prescott Warde as Norris, John Cooper as Edward, Charles James Mathews as Clergyman, Thomas Cooke as Ambrose and Mary Warner as Marian.

== Synopsis ==
It is set on the coast of Cornwall where 'wreckers' stereotypically rob the corpses of those washed ashore in shipwrecks and steal remaining cargo. The heroine is horrified to discover her father is involved in these activities, particularly when his accomplices falsely accuses him of murdering one of the victims of shipwreck.

The play typifies the Whiggish representation of wreckers in the mid-nineteenth century and the moral panic over the cultural practice of 'wrecking'.

== Bibliography ==
- Mandeville, Gloria Estelle. A Century of Melodrama on the London Stage, 1790-1890. Columbia University, 1954.
- Nicoll, Allardyce. A History of Early Nineteenth Century Drama 1800-1850. Cambridge University Press, 1930.
- Slater, Michael. Charles Dickens. Yale University Press, 2011.
