= Alfred Wigan =

English actor-manager

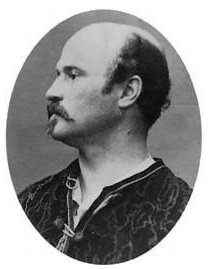
- Born: Alfred Sydney Wigan; 24 March 1814; Blackheath, London, England
- Died: 29 November 1878 (aged 64); Folkestone, Kent, England
- Occupation: actor-manager
- Spouse: Leonora Pincott

Alfred Sydney Wigan (24 March 1814 (Note: Some sources say 24 March 1818) – 29 November 1878) was an English actor-manager who took part in the first Royal Command Performance before Queen Victoria on 28 December 1848.

== Life ==
Born at Blackheath to James Wigan, a teacher of languages and Secretary of the Dramatic Authors' Society, the actor and playwright Horace Wigan was his younger brother. Little is known of Wigan's early career, but it is believed he toured for a period as a singer. Using his middle name, he acted as Sidney or Sydney Wigan at the Lyceum Theatre in 1834, and 1835 he appeared with Louisa Cranstoun Nisbett at the Queen's Theatre. He then appeared under the name of Sidney Wigan with John Braham at the newly built St James's Theatre, creating the role of John Johnson in The Strange Gentleman by Charles Dickens. With Lucia Elizabeth Vestris he appeared from 1839 to 1844 at Covent Garden, playing the original Sir Otto of Steinberg in Love by James Sheridan Knowles. On 5 August 1839 he married the actress Leonora Pincott, who afterwards would be billed as Mrs Alfred Wigan.

At the Royal Strand Theatre he impersonated W. C. Macready as Iago in a parody of Othello. Next, he acted at the Lyceum Theatre with husband and wife actors Robert and Mary Anne Keeley. In 1847 Wigan joined the company of Benjamin Nottingham Webster at the Haymarket Theatre, for whom he played Sir Benjamin Backbite in Sheridan's The School for Scandal. For Webster he created the roles of Osborne in Westland Marston's The Heart and the World and Hector Mauléon in Webster's own play The Roused Lion.

Alfred Wigan took part in the first Royal Command Performance, which was staged at Windsor Castle on 28 December 1848 by order of Queen Victoria. The play was The Merchant of Venice, and the cast included Mr and Mrs Charles Kean, Mr and Mrs Keeley, Henry Lowe and Leigh Murray. He appeared with Rosa Bennett in Thomas Holcroft's The Road to Ruin at the Haymarket Theatre on 7 October 1852. From 1853 to 1857 he was the actor-manager of the Olympic Theatre, retiring due to ill health in the latter year. However, in March 1859 he played Sir Paul Pagoda in The Bengal Tiger at the Adelphi Theatre.

He resumed his theatrical career in 1860, taking over the management of the St James's Theatre, and retiring again in 1863. When the Queen's Theatre opened in 1867 Wigan became its actor-manager, forming a new company which included Charles Wyndham, Henry Irving, J. L. Toole, Lionel Brough, Ellen Terry, and Henrietta Hodson, managing the theatre and acting in productions. The theatre opened with Charles Reade's The Double Marriage on 24 October 1867. The spectator said that the play was a poor choice as its "unnatural plot" failed to show off the managers acting skills. The next plays Still Waters Run Deep and the same newspaper was much more pleased commenting on the performance of both Wigan and Mrs Wigan showing "their remarkable powers".

When the Gaiety Theatre opened in December 1868 Wigan appeared as Adolphe Chavillard in On the Cards; also on that first bill were several companion pieces, including the successful Robert the Devil, by W. S. Gilbert, a burlesque of the opera Robert le Diable. In May 1870 Wigan appeared as Lord Foppington in John Hollingshead's The Man of Quality. His final performance was at the Theatre Royal, Drury Lane in 1874, after which he retired for the last time, apart from giving several private readings and an afternoon performance at the Gaiety Theatre of The House or the Home and The Bengal Tiger.

Alfred Wigan died at his home in Folkestone on 29 November 1878 and was buried in Kensal Green Cemetery. his wife, Leonora survived him.
