= The Touchstone (play) =

1817 play

- Original language: English
- Written by: James Kenney
- Genre: Comedy

Premiere
- Date: 3 May 1817
- Place: Theatre Royal, Drury Lane, London

The Touchstone is an 1817 comedy play by the British writer James Kenney. It premiered at the Theatre Royal, Drury Lane in London on 3 May 1817. The original cast included Charles Holland as Finesse, James William Wallack as Garnish, John Pritt Harley as Paragon, William Dowton as Probe, William Oxberry as Croply, Frances Maria Kelly as Dinah Croply, Sarah Harlowe as Mrs. Fairweather and Frances Alsop as Miss Becky. Its Irish debut was at Dublin's Crow Street Theatre on 16 February 1818.

The play was reviewed by William Hazlitt in A View of the English Stage. He wrote it "has been acted here with great success. It possesses much liveliness and pleasantry in the incidents, and the dialogue is neat and pointed" and considered "the character of Dinah Croply, which is admirably sustained by Miss Kelly, is the chief attraction of the piece".

== Bibliography ==
- Greene, John C. Theatre in Dublin, 1745-1820: A Calendar of Performances, Volume 6. Lexington Books, 2011.
- Hazlitt, William. A View of the English Stage: Or, a Series of Dramatic Criticisms. John Warren, 1821.
- Nicoll, Allardyce. A History of Early Nineteenth Century Drama 1800-1850. Cambridge University Press, 1930.
