= The Maid of Mariendorpt =

1838 play

- Original language: English
- Written by: James Sheridan Knowles
- Genre: Drama

Premiere
- Date: 8 October 1838
- Place: Haymarket Theatre, London

The Maid of Mariendorpt is an 1838 play by the Irish writer James Sheridan Knowles. It was inspired by the 1821 novel The Village of Mariendorpt by Anna Maria Porter. It premiered at the Theatre Royal, Haymarket in London on 8 October 1838. The original cast included Sheridan Knowles as Muldenhau, Robert Strickland as General Kleiner, Walter Lacy as Baron Idenstein, Benjamin Nottingham Webster as Joseph, John Buckstone as Hans, Fanny Cooper as Adolpha, Emma Elphinstone as Meeta, Julia Glover as Esther. The same year it appeared at the Walnut Street Theatre in Philadelphia.

== Bibliography ==
- Cox, Michael. The Concise Oxford Chronology of English Literature. Oxford University Press, 2005.
- Nicoll, Allardyce. A History of Early Nineteenth Century Drama 1800-1850. Cambridge University Press, 1930.
- Wilson, Arthur Herman. A History of the Philadelphia Theatre, 1835-1855.
