= The Love Chase =

1837 play

- Original language: English
- Written by: James Sheridan Knowles
- Genre: Comedy
- Setting: London, present day

Premiere
- Date: 9 October 1837
- Place: Haymarket Theatre, London

The Love Chase is an 1837 comedy play by the Irish-born writer James Sheridan Knowles. It premiered at the Haymarket Theatre in London on 10 October 1837 with a cast that included Robert Strickland as Sir William Fondlove, Edward William Elton as Waller, Benjamin Nottingham Webster as Wildrake, Julia Glover as Widow Green and Charlotte Vandenhoff as Lydia. Louisa Cranstoun Nisbett's role as Constance became one of her two signature parts. The Haymarket had just come under the management of Benjamin Webster that year.

== Bibliography ==
- Bratton, Jacky. The Making of the West End Stage: Marriage, Management and the Mapping of Gender in London, 1830–1870. Cambridge University Press, 2011.
- Nicoll, Allardyce. A History of Early Nineteenth Century Drama 1800-1850. Cambridge University Press, 1930.
- Schlicke, Paul. The Oxford Companion to Charles Dickens: Anniversary Edition. OUP Oxford, 2011.
