= Richard Brinsley Knowles =

British journalist (1820–1882)

Richard Brinsley Knowles (17 January 1820 – 28 January 1882) was a British journalist.

== Biography ==
Knowles, son of James Sheridan Knowles, a dramatist, was born on 17 January 1820, at Glasgow and about 1838 held an appointment in the registrar-general's office, Somerset House, London. He was admitted a student of the Middle Temple on 14 November 1839, and called to the bar 26 May 1843.

His tastes, however, inclined towards literature, and on 19 November 1845 he produced at the Haymarket Theatre a comedy, The Maiden Aunt, which, aided by the acting of William Farren and Mrs. Glover (née Julia Betterton), had a run of thirty nights. In 1849, he joined the church of Rome, and became editor of the Catholic Standard, a publication which was subsequently purchased by Henry Wilberforce, and renamed the Weekly Register. From 1853 to 1855, he edited the Illustrated London Magazine, a series of five volumes. He was one of the chief writers on The Standard from 1857 to 1860, but some display of religious intolerance on the part of the proprietors led to an abrupt termination of his engagement.

Professor John Sherren Brewer, who was then conducting the paper, indignant at the treatment of his colleague, at once relinquished his editorship. Knowles was afterwards editor of the London Review, but in later years his chief engagement was on the Morning Post, until ill-health obliged him to resign his connection with that paper.

He edited the Chronicles of John of Oxenedes (Chronica Johannis de Oxenedes), a manuscript copy of which was found in the Duke of Newcastle's collection; and his edition was published in 1859 in the Rolls Series. In 1871, he was engaged under the Royal Commission on Historical Manuscripts, and described many valuable collections of family muniments, chiefly belonging to Roman Catholic families. Among these were the collections of the Marquess of Bute, the Earl of Denbigh, the Earl of Ashburnham, and Colonel Towneley.

He was the author in 1872 of The Life of James Sheridan Knowles, an edition of twenty-five copies for private circulation.

He died in North Bank, Regent's Park, London, 28 January 1882, aged 62, having married on 25 October 1845 Eliza Mary, youngest child of Peter and Elizabeth Crowley of Dublin, and sister of Nicholas Joseph Crowley (1819–1857), painter. His son, R.B. Sheridan Knowles, was also a writer whose contributions to literature consisted mainly of essays, sketches and reviews, which appeared in various journals and periodicals. He wrote the novel Glencoonoge (1891), a story of Irish life, which first ran serially in The Month and was then published in three volumes.
