= Leonora Wigan =

British actor

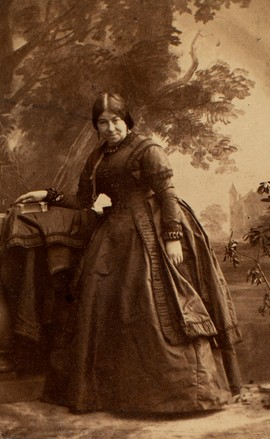
- by Camille Silvy
- Born: 1805
- Died: 17 April 1884 (aged 78–79); Gipsy Hill
- Occupations: stilts, rope walking, acting
- Spouse: Alfred Wigan

Leonora Wigan born Leonora Pincott aka Mrs Alfred Wigan" (1805 – 17 April 1884) was a British actress, known at first as a stilts and rope dancer.

== Life ==
Wigan was born in 1805 when her family name was Pincott and her father was a showman. Her mother was born Elizabeth Waller and her brother was the actor/manager James William Wallack. She appears to have been more of a show person than an actor as she was known for her performances on stilts and as a rope dancer.

She was first known as an actor when she played a chimpanzee when she appeared in a pantomime titled La Perouse, or, The Desolate Island at the English Opera House. Her uncle James William Wallack was working as the stage manager at Drury Lane and she was there from 1826 to 1828 where she took to appearing in more pantomime or stereotype roles such as a walking lady. Three years later she was "noticed" when she appeared at the Olympic as Catherine Seton in a burlesque based on the story of Mary, Queen of Scots and in 1839 she married Alfred Wigan who was a few years younger than her.

She played French women in particular and some headline parts as Mrs Candour in The School for Scandal and as the well known Mrs Malaprop in The Rivals.

The Queen's Theatre opened in 1867 and her husband became its actor-manager, forming a new company which included Charles Wyndham, Henry Irving, J. L. Toole, Lionel Brough, Ellen Terry, and Henrietta Hodson. He was managing the theatre and acting in productions. The theatre opened with Charles Reade's The Double Marriage. The Spectator said that the play was a poor choice, but the next play Still Waters Run Deep was much more pleasing. The paper commented on the performance of both Wigan and Mrs Wigan noting "their remarkable powers". Her best part ever was considered to be playing Mrs Hector Sternhold in Still Waters Run Deep.

Her husband died in Folkestone on 29 November 1878 and he was buried in Kensal Green Cemetery. Wigan died in 1884 in Gipsy Hill in Surrey six years after her younger husband. There is a photograph of her in the Royal Collection and in a V&A collection.
