= Caius Gracchus (play) =

1815 play

- Original language: English
- Written by: James Sheridan Knowles
- Genre: Tragedy

Premiere
- Date: 13 February 1815
- Place: Belfast Theatre, Ireland

Caius Gracchus is a tragedy by the Irish playwright James Sheridan Knowles. It is based on the life of Gaius Gracchus, a politician in Ancient Rome. The play premiered at the Belfast Theatre in 1815 and enjoyed a good reception. It debuted in London's West End at the Theatre Royal, Drury Lane on 18 November 1823, following the success of the author's Virginius. The London cast included William Macready as Caius Gracchus, William Penley as Licinius, Alexander Pope as Drusus, Daniel Terry as Titus, Charles Mayne Young as Vettius, George Yarnold as Fulvius Flaccus, Thomas Archer as Opimius, Mrs. West as Licinia and Margaret Bunn as Cornelia.

== Bibliography ==
- Burwick, Frederck Goslee, Nancy Moore & Hoeveler Diane Long . The Encyclopaedia of Romantic Literature. John Wiley & Sons, 2012.
- Nicoll, Allardyce. A History of Early Nineteenth Century Drama 1800-1850. Cambridge University Press, 1930.
