= Fortescue (novel) =

1846 novel

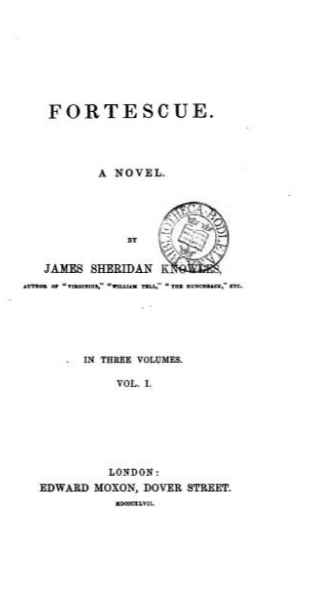
- Title page for Fortescue (1847)
- Author: James Sheridan Knowles
- Language: English
- Publisher: Edward Moxton (London); Harper Brothers (New York)
- Publication date: 1846
- Publication place: United Kingdom
- Media type: Print

Fortescue is an 1846 three-volume novel by the Irish writer James Sheridan Knowles. He had for many years been a leading West End playwright, but by this stage his career was in gradual decline, and he turned to novel-writing. It is set in Cork where Knowles was born and raised. The New Monthly Magazine review believed that the novel may have been semi-autobiographical. It was serialised in The Sunday Times. It was published in New York by Harper Brothers in 1847.

== Bibliography ==
- Burwick, Frederick Goslee, Nancy Moore & Hoeveler Diane Long . The Encyclopedia of Romantic Literature. John Wiley & Sons, 2012.
- Law, Graham. Serializing Fiction in the Victorian Press. Springer, 2000.
- Murphy, James H. Irish Novelists and the Victorian Age. Oxford University Press, 2011.
