= Henry Gattie =

British actor and singer (1774–1844)

Henry Gattie (1774–1844) was a British actor and singer.

== Early life ==
Gattie, was born near Bath, Somerset in 1774, and brought up to the trade of a wig-maker.

== Career ==
Very early in life he acquired a liking for the theatre. At the age of nineteen he had become well known at some musical associations. His first appearances on the stage were in vocal characters, such as Frederick in No Song No Supper, Valentine in The Farmer, and Captain Macheath. On 7 November 1807 he came out at the Bath Theatre as Trot in Morton's comedy Town and Country, and was next seen as Paul in Paul and Virginia, but he soon settled down into playing as a general rule men, Frenchmen, and Irishmen.

Having been introduced by W. Lovegrove, the comedian, to Samuel James Arnold, the proprietor of the Lyceum Theatre, Gattie made his first appearance in London on 14 July 1813, in a new comic opera entitled M.P., or the Blue Stocking, in which he took the character of La Fosse, and afterwards played Sir Harry Sycamore and other men characters and footmen's parts. From this house he migrated to the Theatre Royal, Drury Lane, where he was first seen, 6 October 1813, as Vortex in A Cure for the Heartache. He remained at Drury Lane until his retirement in 1833, filling up his summer vacations at the Haymarket Theatre, the Lyceum and other houses. At Drury Lane, where he was in the receipt of seven pounds a week, he was frequently the substitute for Joseph Shepherd Munden, William Dowton, Daniel Terry and Charles Mathews, to none of whom, however, was he equal in talent. On 21 August 1815 he took the part of the justice of the village in The Maid and the Magpie at the Lyceum Theatre.

His most celebrated and best-known impersonation was Monsieur Morbleu in William Thomas Moncrieff's farce of Monsieur Tonson, which was first played at Drury Lane on 20 September 1821. His acting in this piece was much commended by George IV, who had commanded its performance on the occasion of a royal bespeak soon after its first production. Another of his characters was Dr. Caius in The Merry Wives of Windsor.

== Post career ==
After a career of twenty-six years as an actor he retired from the stage in 1833, and opened a cigar-shop at Oxford, which became the resort of many of the collegians, by whom his dry humour was much appreciated. He was married, but had no family. His death took place at Reading, Berkshire 17 November 1844, in the seventieth year of his age.
