= Charles Selby =

English actor and playwright

Charles Selby (c. 1802 – 1863) was a 19th-century English actor, playwright, and translator of many French plays (often without attribution, not uncommon at the time).

Among his works was The Marble Heart (1854), a translation of Théodore Barrière's Les Filles de marbre. The play is best known today for a 9 November 1863 performance in Washington, D.C., where President Abraham Lincoln watched John Wilkes Booth, playing the villain Raphael. Booth directed some of his threatening lines directly to Lincoln, causing one of Lincoln's party to remark, "he looks as if he meant that for you." Lincoln agreed, noting "he does look pretty sharp at me, doesn't he?"

Selby died at his home in Covent Garden, London, on 21 March 1863 and was buried at Kensal Green Cemetery.

== Selected works (incomplete) ==
- The Unfinished Gentleman (1834)
- Robert Macaire (1834) (adaptation of Frédérick Lemaître play)
- Hunting a Turtle (1834), a farce in one act
- Maximums and Speciments [sic] of William Muggins (book) (1841)
- Young Mother (1841), a comic drama in one act
- The Married Rake (1834), a farce
- Barnaby Rudge (1841) (adaptation of Charles Dickens novel with Charles Melville)
- Antony and Cleopatra (1842) (translation from French)
- Boots at the Swan (1847), a farce in one act
- Peggy Green (1847), comic drama
- The Marble Heart (1854) (translation of Les Filles de marbre)
- A Phantom Breakfast (1856), a farce in one act
- The Dinner Question (cookbook) (1860), as "Tabitha Tickletooth"
