= James Sheridan Knowles =

Irish dramatist and actor (1784–1862)

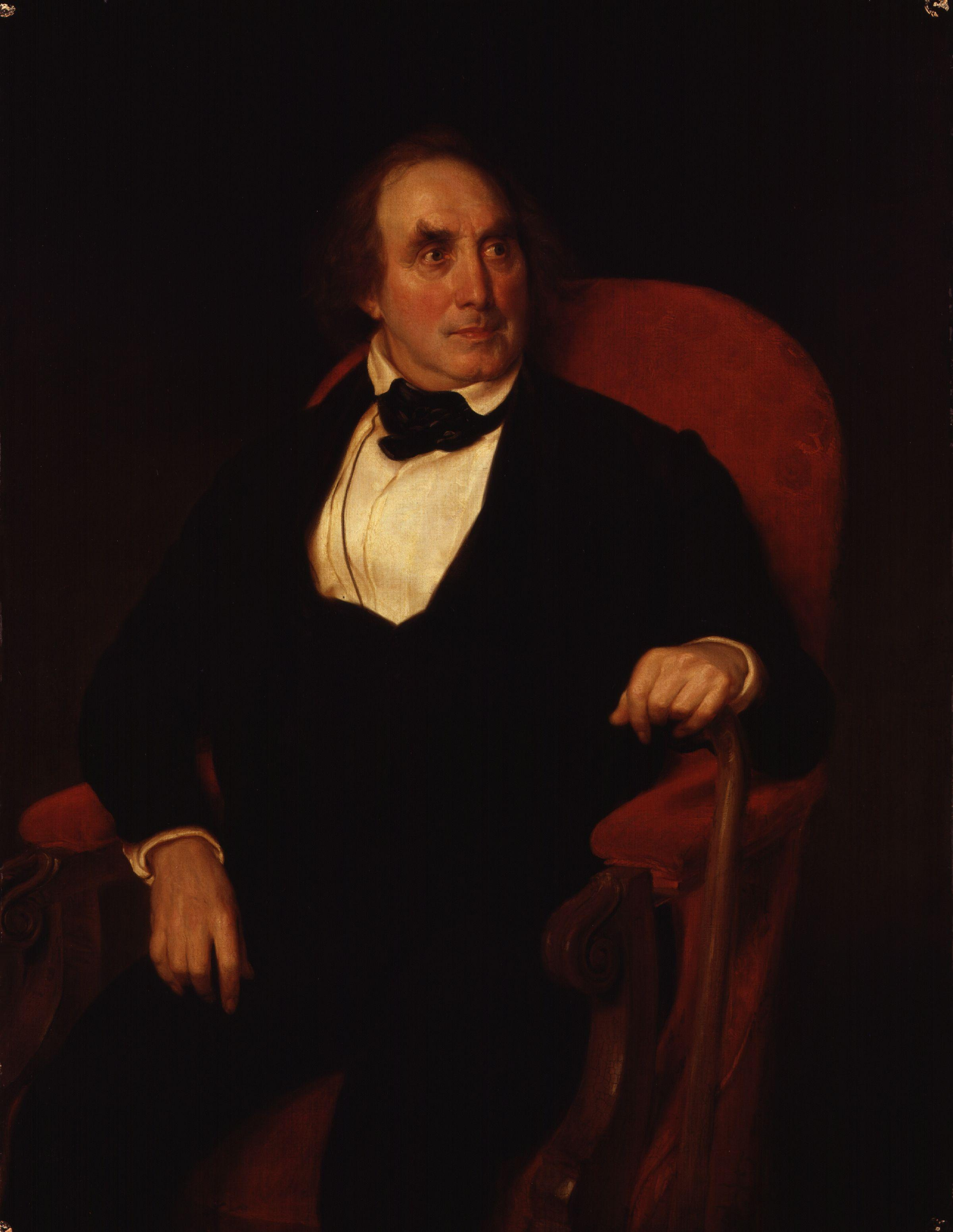
- James Sheridan Knowles by Wilhelm Trautschold, 1849
- Born: 12 May 1784; Cork, County Cork, Kingdom of Ireland
- Died: 30 November 1862 (aged 78); Torquay, Devon, United Kingdom
- Occupations: Dramatist and actor
- Spouse: Maria Charteris

James Sheridan Knowles (12 May 1784 – 30 November 1862) was an Irish dramatist and actor. A relative of Richard Brinsley Sheridan, Knowles enjoyed success writing plays for the leading West End theatres. Later in his career he also produced several novels.

== Early life ==
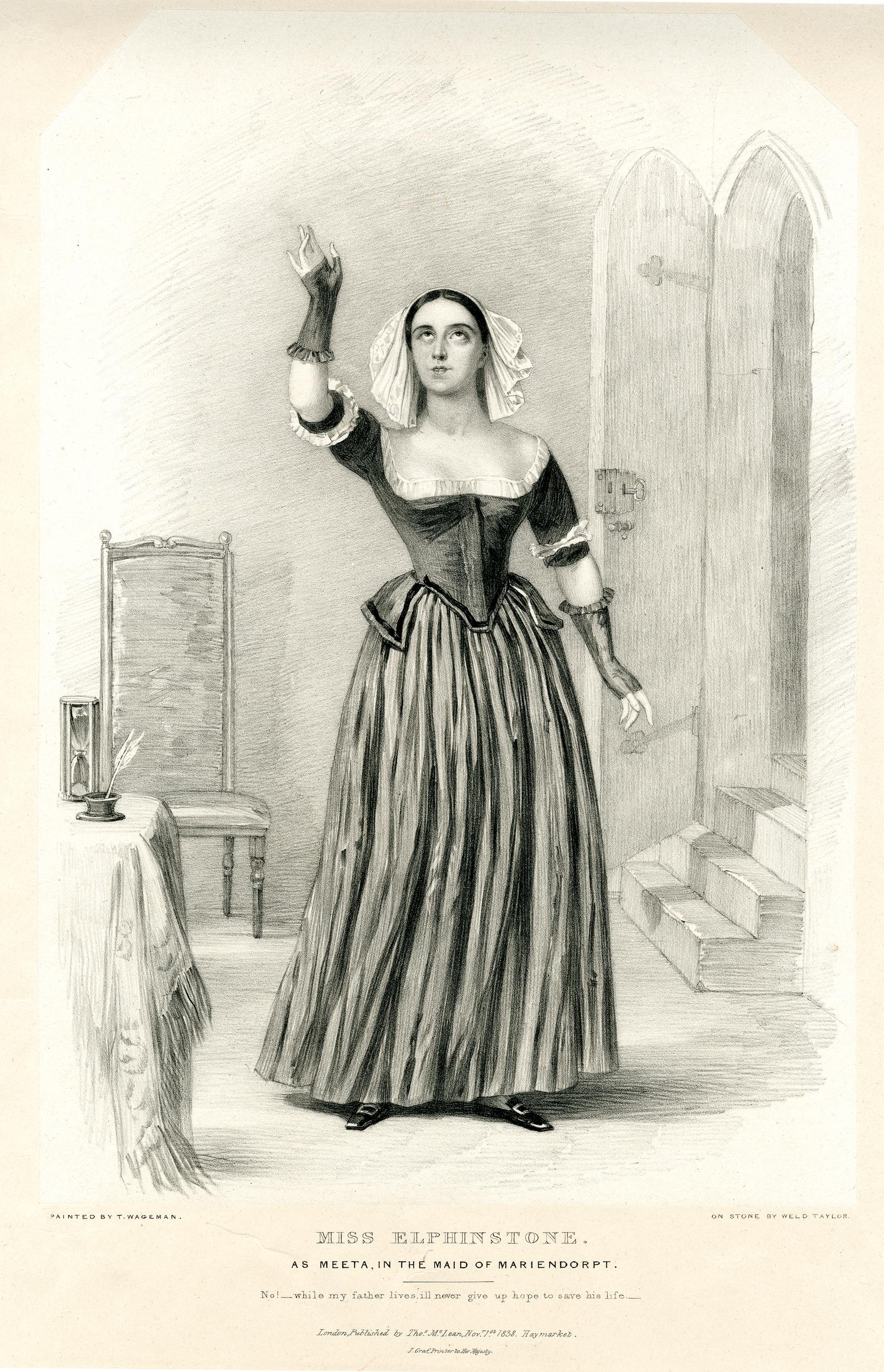
His second wife the actress Emma Knowles in The Maid of Mariendorpt (1838).

Knowles was born in Cork. His father was the lexicographer James Knowles, cousin of Richard Brinsley Sheridan. The family moved to London in 1793, and at the age of fourteen Knowles published a ballad entitled The Welsh Harper, which, set to music, was very popular. His talents secured him the friendship of William Hazlitt, who introduced him to Charles Lamb and Samuel Taylor Coleridge. He served for some time in the Wiltshire and afterwards in the Tower Hamlets militia, leaving the service to become a pupil of Dr Robert Willan (1757–1812). He obtained the degree of M.D., and was appointed vaccinator to the Jennerian Society.

== Literary career ==
Although Dr Willan offered him a share in his practice, Knowles decided to give up medicine for the stage, making his first appearance as an actor probably at Bath, and played Hamlet at Crow Street Theatre, Dublin. At Wexford he married, in October 1809, Maria Charteris, an actress from the Edinburgh Theatre. In 1810 he wrote Leo, a successful play in which Edmund Kean appeared; another play, Brian Boroihme, written for the Belfast Theatre in the next year, attracted crowds; nevertheless, Knowles's earnings were so small that he was obliged to become assistant to his father at the Belfast Academical Institution. In 1817 he moved from Belfast to Glasgow, where, besides keeping a flourishing school, he continued to write for the stage.

His first important success was Caius Gracchus, produced at the Belfast Theatre in 1815; and his Virginius, written for William Charles Macready, was first performed in 1820 at Covent Garden. In William Tell (1825), Knowles wrote for Macready one of his favourite parts. His best-known play, The Hunchback, was produced at Covent Garden in 1832, and Knowles won praise acting in the work as Master Walter. The Wife was brought out at the same theatre in 1833; The Daughter better known as The Wrecker's Daughter, in 1836, and The Love Chase in 1837. His 1839 play Love was praised by Mary Shelley for its "inspiring situations founded on sentiment and passion". His second wife was the actress Emma Knowles.

== Later life ==
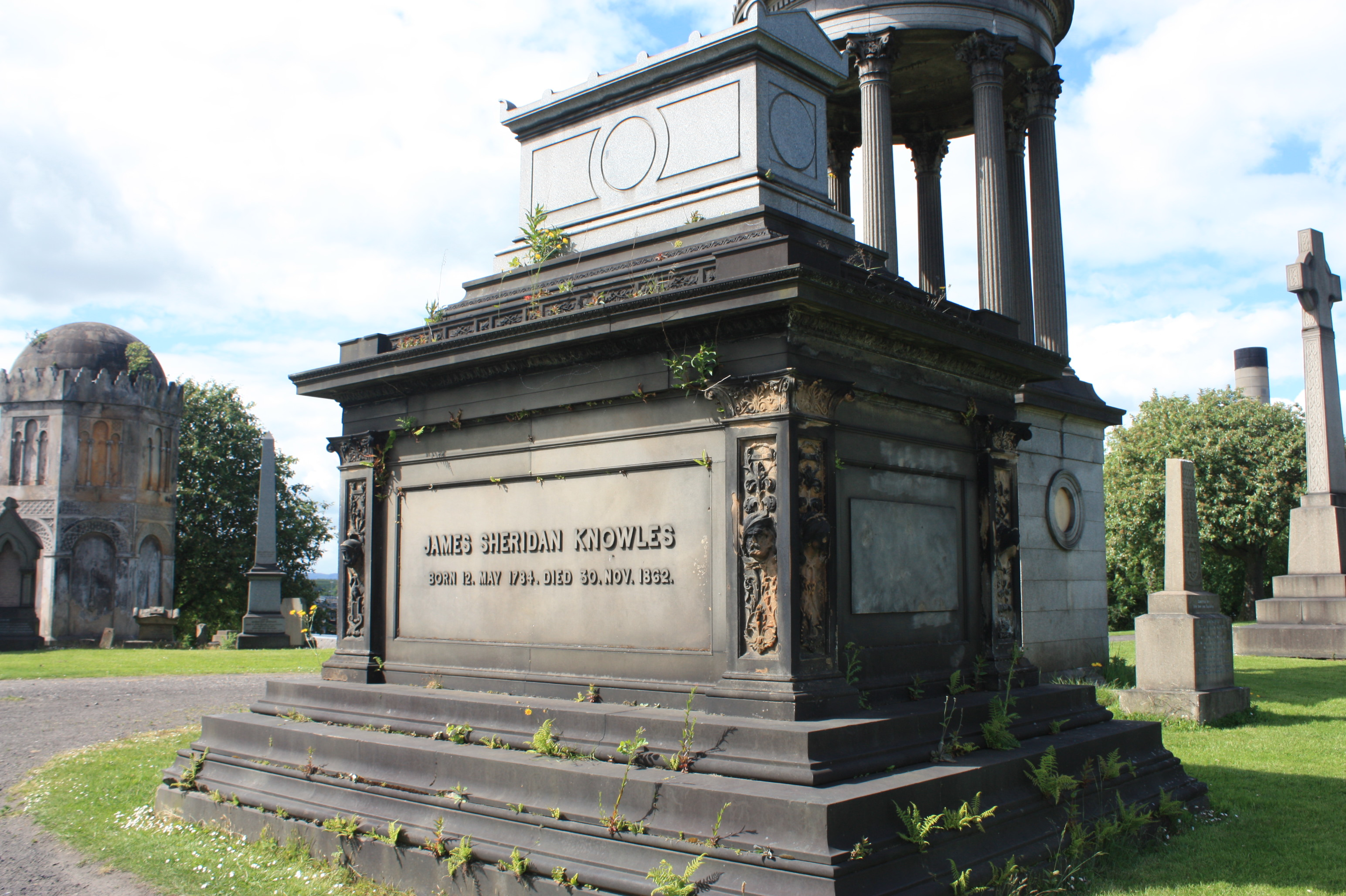
The grave of James Sheridan Knowles, Glasgow Necropolis

In his later years he forsook the stage for the pulpit, and as a Baptist preacher attracted large audiences at Exeter Hall and elsewhere. He published two polemical works: the Rock of Rome and the Idol Demolished by Its Own Priests in both of which he combated the special doctrines of the Roman Catholic Church. Knowles was for some years in the receipt of an annual pension of £200, bestowed by Sir Robert Peel in 1849. In old age he befriended the young Edmund Gosse, whom he introduced to Shakespeare. Knowles makes a happy appearance in Gosse's Father and Son.

He died at Torquay on 30 November 1862. He is buried under a huge tomb at the summit of the Glasgow Necropolis.

== Bibliography ==
A full list of the works of Knowles and of the various notices of him will be found in The Life of James Sheridan Knowles (1872), privately printed by his son, Richard Brinsley Knowles (1820–1882), who was well known as a journalist. It was translated into German.

== Works ==
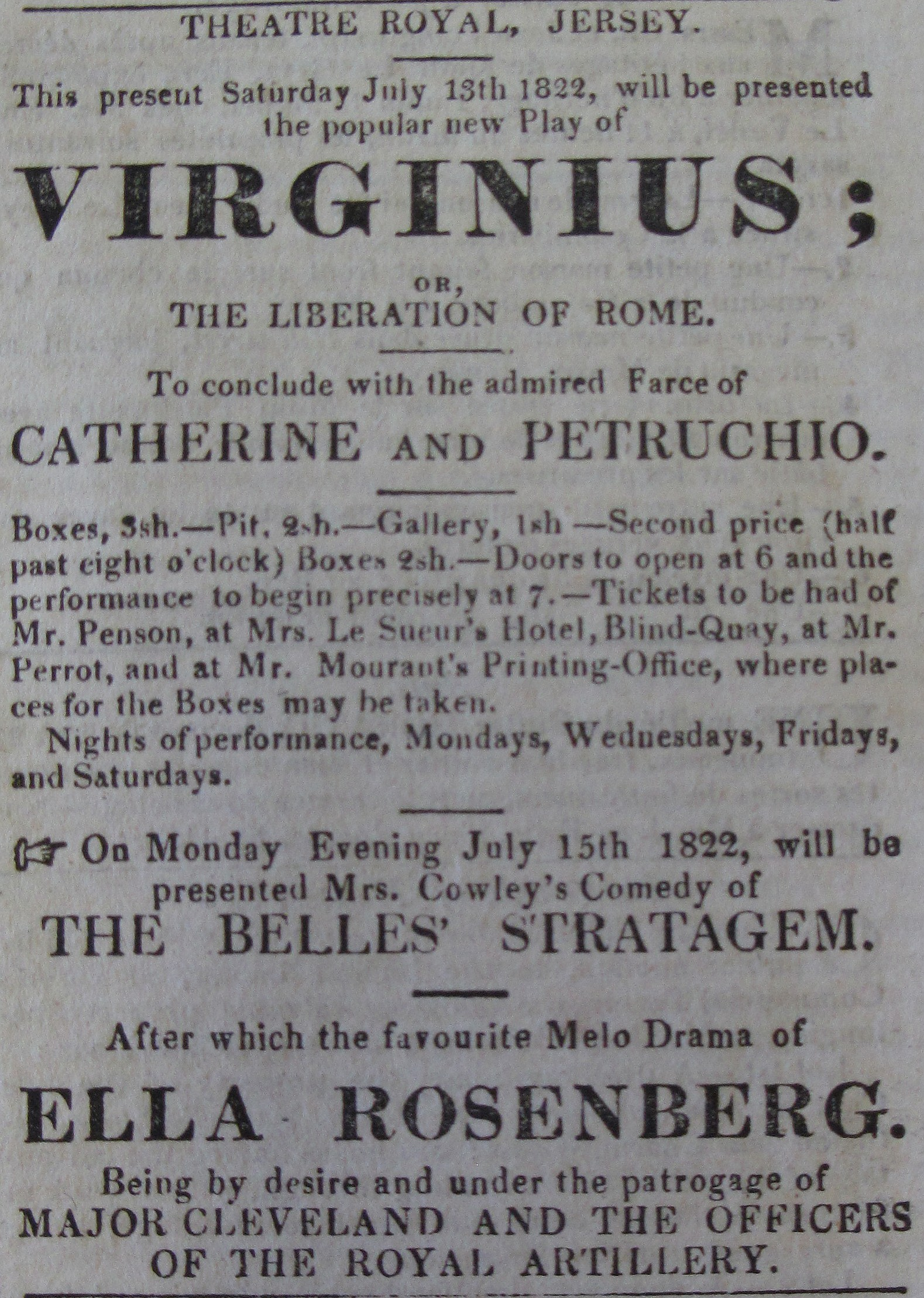
An advertisement for a performance of Virginius in Jersey on 13 July 1822

=== Plays ===
- Leo; or, The Gipsy (1810)
- Brian Boroihme; or, The Maid of Erin (1811)
- Caius Gracchus (1815)
- Virginius (1820) A Tragedy in Five Acts
- William Tell (1825)
- The Beggar's Daughter of Bethnal Green (1828)
- Alfred the Great; or The Patriot King (1831)
- The Hunchback (1832)
- A Masque (in one act and in verse on the death of Sir Walter Scott) (1832)
- The Wife; A Tale of Mantua (1833)
- The Beggar of Bethnal Green (1834)
- The Bridal (1837) (An adaptation of The Maid's Tragedy)
- The Daughter (1837)
- The Love Chase (1837)
- Woman's Wit (1838)
- The Maid of Mariendorpt (1838)
- Love (1839)
- John of Procida; or, The Bridals of Messina (1840)
- Old Maids (1841)
- The Rose of Arragon (1842)
- The Secretary (1843)
- Alexina; or, True unto Death (1866)

=== Novels and short stories ===
- The Magdalen and Other Tales (1832)
- Fortescue (1846)
- George Lovell (1847)

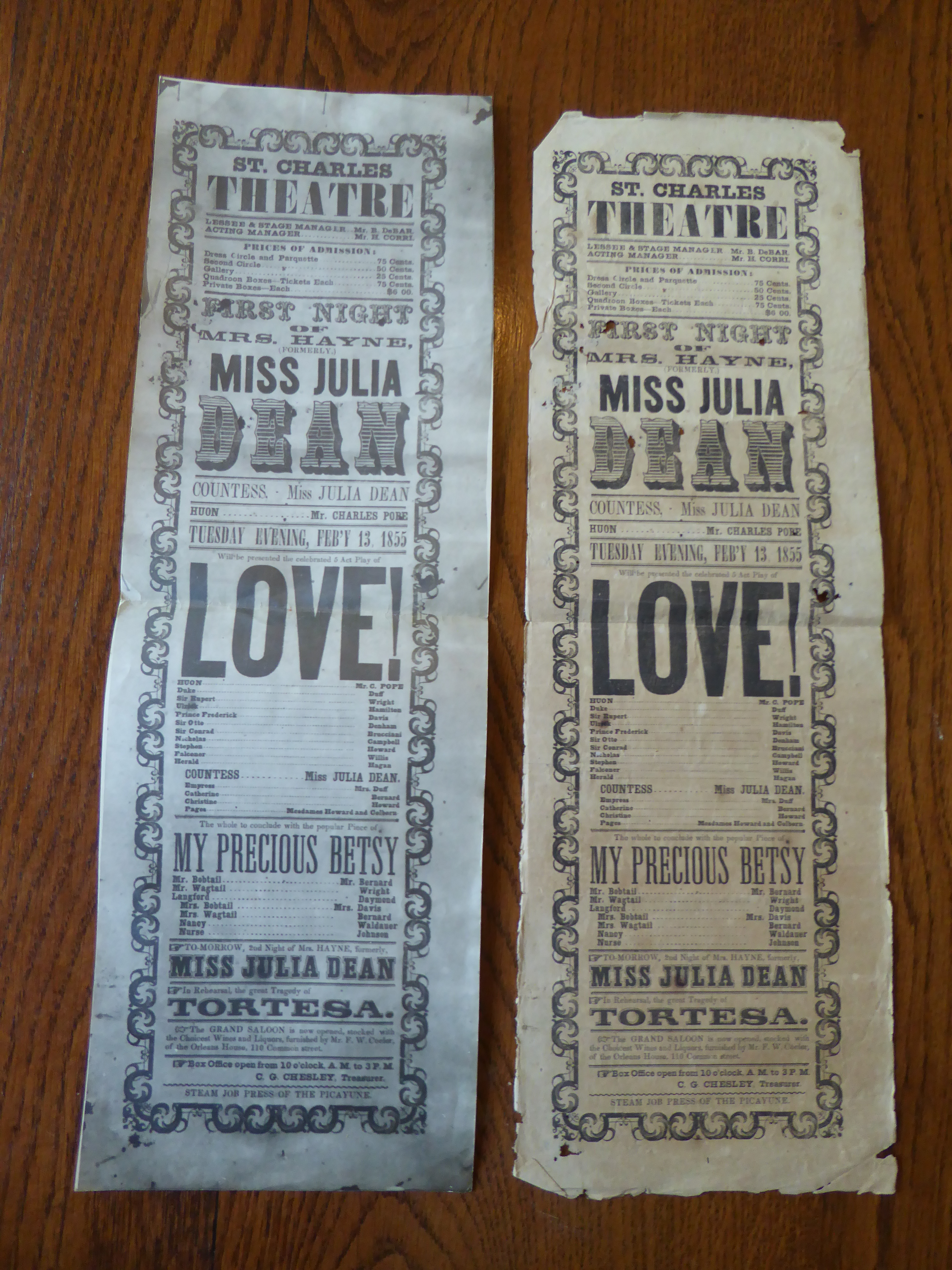
1855 playbill for "Love!" a play in five acts, St. Charles Theatre New Orleans Louisiana.

- Old Adventures (1859)
- Tales and Novelettes etc. (1874)

=== Poetry ===
- A Collection of Poems on Various Subjects (1810)
- Fugitive Pieces
- The Senate, or Social Villagers of Kentish Town, a Canto (1817)

=== Theological writings ===
- The Rock of Rome; or, The Arch Heresy (1849)
- The Idol Demolished by Its Own Priest (1852) (An answer to Cardinal Wiseman's Lectures on Transubstantiation.)
- The Gospel Attributed to Matthew in the Record of the Whole Original Apostlehood (1855)

=== Non-fiction ===
- The Elocutionist (1831) (A collection of pieces in prose and verse; peculiarly adapted to display the art of reading...)
- A Treatise on the Climate of Madeira (1850)
- The Debater's Handbook (1862)
- Lectures on Dramatic Literature (1875)
