= Walter Lacy =

English actor

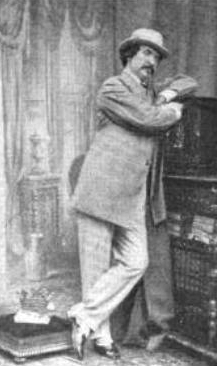
- Born: Walter Williams; 1809; Bristol, England
- Died: 13 December 1898 (aged 88–89); Brighton, England
- Burial place: Brompton Cemetery
- Occupation: Actor

Walter Lacy (1809 – 13 December 1898) was an English actor. In a long career he played leading roles in London theatres.

== Early life and career ==
Lacy was born, as Walter Williams, in Bristol in 1809, the son of a coach-builder, and was educated for the medical profession. He was first seen on the stage in Edinburgh in 1829, as Count Montalban in The Honey Moon; he was playing there again in 1832, and acted also in Glasgow, Liverpool, and Manchester.

His debut in London was at the Haymarket Theatre in August 1838, as Charles Surface in The School for Scandal. Harriette Taylor, who played Lady Teazle in the production, became Lacy's wife in 1839. After three years' engagement at the Haymarket, he accepted three years' engagement at Covent Garden, where he first appeared as Captain Absolute in The Rivals. He then joined the company of Drury Lane; his first appearance there was as Wildrake in James Sheridan Knowles's The Love Chase.

== Princess's Theatre ==
For seven years he was a member of the company at the Princess's Theatre in London, under the management of Charles Kean. He was first seen there in September 1852, as Rouble in the first performance of Dion Boucicault's The Prima Donna, and as Chateau Renaud in Boucicault's The Corsican Brothers. A reviewer wrote: "Rouble, the generous, wrong-headed millionaire, always fighting for his mistress, and always offending her, was admirably dressed and played by Mr Walter Lacy, who is a new addition to the company. His ludicrous distress, tempered in the oddest manner by a sort of cold nonchalance, made up one of those characteristic inconsistencies which stand out in the memory from the level of ordinary stage routine.... His performance of Chateau Renaud in The Corsican Brothers... was a great instance of his care and judgment in a part quite out of his usual line, and in which he had all the disadvantage of appearing after an excellent predecessor."

Other parts played at this theatre included John of Gaunt in Richard II, Edmund in King Lear, and Lord Trinket in The Jealous Wife.

== Later career ==
He later appeared in various London theatres. In June 1860 he was, at the Lyceum Theatre, the Marquis of Saint Evremont in a dramatization of A Tale of Two Cities, and at Drury Lane in October 1864 was Cloten to Helena Faucit's Imogen in Cymbeline. He was Flutter in The Belle's Stratagem in October 1866 at St James's Theatre, where he was in November the first John Leigh in Boucicault's Hunted Down. In two Lyceum revivals of Romeo and Juliet he was Mercutio. In August 1868 he was, at the Princess's, the original Bellingham in Boucicault's After Dark.

He became Professor of Elocution at the Royal Academy of Music, and was absent from the stage for many years. He reappeared at the Lyceum in April 1879 as Colonel Damas in Sir Henry Irving's revival of The Lady of Lyons. A reviewer wrote: "Colonel Damas exhibited a nature gentler and more subdued than that with which most actors have been wont to invest that worthy soldier; yet there were still distinctly to be traced those enduring remains of a skilled and careful training which neither time nor long disuse are ever able wholly to efface."

He died on 13 December 1898 at 13 Marine Square, Brighton, and was buried at Brompton Cemetery on 17 December.

The drama critic Joseph Knight wrote: "Lacy was a respectable light comedian, but failed as an exponent of old men.... He was a familiar figure at the Garrick Club... and was almost to the last a man of much vivacity, and of quaint, clever, unbridled, and characteristic speech."

== Selected roles ==
- Baron Idenstein in The Maid of Mariendorpt by James Sheridan Knowles (1838)
- Ingoldsby in Master Clarke by Thomas Serle (1840)
- Lindsay in Glencoe by Thomas Talfourd (1840)
- Robert in Old Maids by James Sheridan Knowles (1841)
- St. Lo in Love's Sacrifice by George William Lovell (1842)
- Llaniston in Anne Blake by John Westland Marston (1852)
