= Maria Ann Lovell =

English actress and playwright

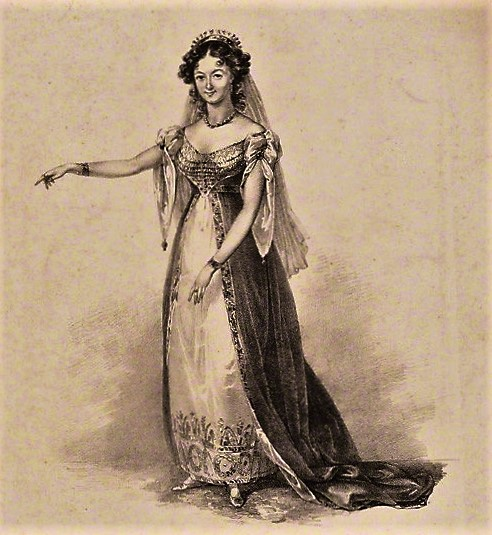
- Born: 1803
- Died: 1877 (aged 73–74)

Maria Ann Lovell or Maria Lovell; Maria Lacy; Maria Ann Lacy (1803–1877) was an English actress and playwright, often referred to as Mrs G. W. Lovell. She acted under the name Miss Lacy.

== Life ==
Lovell was born in London on 15 July 1803 to Willoughby Lacy of Drury Lane. She was a working actor by 1818 when she successfully appeared in Belfast. By 1820 she was appearing in Scotland with Edward Kean and Charles Young. In 1822 she appeared at Covent Garden with such success that in time she was given a three-year contract. By 1826 she had appeared in Love's Victory by Lady Mary Wroth and a lithograph recorded her role.

She retired from acting and married in 1830 George William Lovell, a well-known dramatist, author of The Provost of Bruges, The Wife's Secret, Love's Sacrifice, Look Before You Leap, and The Trial of Love.

Her father died in 1831.

Lovell published a five act play titled Ingomar the Barbarian from Der Sohn der Wildnis ("The Son of the Wilderness"), a German-language play by Eligius Franz Joseph, Freiherr von Munch-Bellinghausen, an Austrian who wrote as Friedrich Halm, and has been referred to as "Bellinghausen". The leading role of Parthenia was taken by Charlotte Vandenhoff when it was first performed at Drury Lane in 1851. Four years later she published another play, titled The Beginning and the End in four acts. It was performed at the Haymarket in 1855.

Lovell died in Hampstead on 2 April 1877.
