= The Rose of Arragon =

1842 play

- Original language: English
- Written by: James Sheridan Knowles
- Genre: Tragedy

Premiere
- Date: 4 June 1842
- Place: Haymarket Theatre, London

The Rose of Arragon is an 1842 tragedy by the Irish-born writer James Sheridan Knowles. It premiered at the Theatre Royal, Haymarket in London on 4 June 1842. The cast included Ellen Kean as Olivia, Charles Kean as Alasco, Henry Howe as the King of Arragon, Samuel Phelps as Almargo and Frederick Vining as Velasquez. It was similar in style to Knowles' earlier work The Wife of Mantua. In 1849 William Creswick opened his actor-management of the Surrey Theatre by playing Alasco in a revival.

== Bibliography ==
- Burwick, Frederick Goslee, Nancy Moore & Hoeveler Diane Long . The Encyclopedia of Romantic Literature. John Wiley & Sons, 2012.
- Nicoll, Allardyce. A History of Early Nineteenth Century Drama 1800-1850. Cambridge University Press, 1930.
