= James Robertson Anderson =

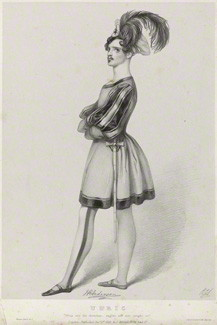
- Anderson as Ulric in Werner by Richard Lane
- Born: 8 May 1811; Glasgow, Scotland, British Empire
- Died: 3 March 1895 (aged 83); London, England, British Empire
- Cause of death: murdered

James Robertson Anderson (8 May 1811 – 3 March 1895) was a Scottish stage actor and dramatist.

== Life ==
Anderson was born in Glasgow on 8 May 1811. His father was an actor and he went to school on Leith Walk in Edinburgh. He acted as a toddler in 1813 in Edinburgh under William Henry Murray. He married in 1831 and his wife appeared in New York. Anderson acted in Nottingham around 1830 and around Newcastle upon Tyne until in 1834 he became the manager of the Leicester, Gloucester, and Cheltenham theatres. He married his second wife Georgina Stohwasser in Kensington in 1836.

He left his job as a theatre manager to make his London debut with William Charles Macready at Covent Garden as Florizel in the 1837 Winter's Tale. At the Theatre Royal, Drury Lane he was the first Basil Firebrace in Douglas Jerrold's Prisoner of War. He was also seen as Othello, Iago, Cassio and others. In 1846 he left for America, and cannily published his diary for 1847 on his return.

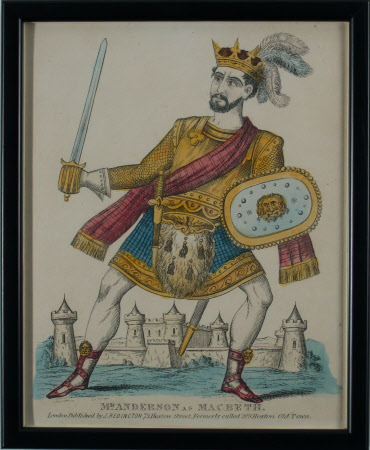
As Macbeth

On Boxing Day 1849, as manager of the Theatre Royal, Drury Lane, he opened with the Merchant of Venice. Among the pieces he produced was a play by Beaumont and Fletcher, Schiller's Fiesco, Dion Boucicault's Queen of Spades, and defined the name part in Maria Ann Lovell's Ingomar the Barbarian. Another role he made his own was in Laurent and Fitzball's Azael, the Prodigal Son, based on Auber's L'enfant prodigue.

In 1851 he retired from management, citing the postponement of the Great Exhibition and his losses which ran to thousands of pounds. Between 1853 and 1858 he frequented America, but he was also at the Theatre Royal, Drury Lane, as Rob Roy in 1855. In 1863 he joined the Surrey Theatre management. Before the theatre was burned to the ground in January 1865, Anderson produced one of his own plays, The Scottish Chief; and he played two parts in his production of Henry VI, Part 2. For his "benefit" in 1865 at Drury Lane, he played Marc Antony in Julius Caesar.

He arrived in Australia in 1867 a few weeks after Walter Montgomery, with the result that the two actors were inevitably compared: the younger Montgomery, playing Hamlet at the Theatre Royal, Melbourne as the "modern" Shakespearean follower of Charles Fechter, and Anderson the outmoded "elocutionary" school of Macready. A leading critic of Anderson was Dr J. E. Neild, of Melbourne's Argus and Australasian newspapers.

After visiting Australia he reappeared in 1874 at Drury Lane as Richard I in Andrew Halliday's adaption of Sir Walter Scott's novel The Talisman; and he played Marc Antony again but this time in Antony and Cleopatra. Besides The Scottish Chief, he wrote other dramas, of which Cloud and Sunshine was published in 1868.

Anderson had a good figure and, before he ruined it, a powerful voice. William Macready praised him, and John Westland Marston praised his Ulric in Werner (see picture). He wrote and published his autobiography in 1887. He frequented the Garrick Club. Returning one evening in February 1895 to home at the Bedford Hotel, Covent Garden, he was attacked and garrotted. He never recovered and died at the Bedford Hotel on 3 March 1895. He was buried at Kensal Green Cemetery.

In 1902, his autobiography, An Actor's Life, was published, with an introduction by W. E. Adams.
