= The Trial of Love =

1852 play

- Original language: English
- Written by: George William Lovell
- Genre: Drama

Premiere
- Date: 7 June 1852
- Place: Princess's Theatre in London

The Trial of Love is an 1852 play by the British writer George William Lovell. It premiered at the Princess's Theatre in London on 7 June 1852. It was his final play, and ran for 23 nights. The cast featured Charles Kean and Ellen Kean.

== Bibliography ==
- Nicoll, Allardyce. A History of Early Nineteenth Century Drama 1800-1850. Cambridge University Press, 1930.
- Stephen, Leslie & Lee, Sidney. Dictionary of National Biography, Volume 34.Smith, Elder, & Company, 1893.
