= Anne Blake =

1852 play

- Original language: English
- Written by: John Westland Marston
- Genre: Melodrama
- Setting: North Wales, present day

Premiere
- Date: 28 October 1852
- Place: Princess's Theatre, London

Anne Blake is an 1852 melodrama by the British writer John Westland Marston. It premiered at the Princess's Theatre in London on 28 October 1852. The original cast included Charles Kean as Thorold, Walter Lacy as Llaniston, Ellen Kean as Anne Blake. The same year it appeared at the Broadway Theatre in New York.

== Bibliography ==
- Booth, Michael R. Prefaces to English Nineteenth-century Theatre. Manchester University Press, 1980.
- Taylor, George. Players and Performances in the Victorian Theatre. Manchester University Press, 1993.
- Tucker, Herbert F (ed.) A New Companion to Victorian Literature and Culture. John Wiley & Sons, 2014.
