= Walter Montgomery (actor) =

American-British actor

Walter Montgomery

Walter Montgomery (1827–1871) was an American-born British actor, real name Richard Tomlinson.

== Life ==
Montgomery was born 25 August 1827, at Gawennis, Long Island, United States, but settled in England. While occupied in business in Cheapside with a shawl manufacturer named Warwick, he took part in amateur entertainments, appearing at the Soho Theatre in Othello.

Engaged by James Henry Chute, the manager of the Bath Theatre, he played there and in Bristol, Birmingham, Norwich, and Great Yarmouth. In Nottingham, where he became a favourite, he began on management.

== On the London stage ==
Montgomery's first appearance in London was at the Princess's Theatre, 20 June 1863, as Othello, and inspired little interest. On the 24th he played Romeo to the Juliet of Stella Colas. Under his own management he appeared as Shylock, 22 August. The following March he gave, at St. James's Hall, readings from Shakespeare, Thomas Hood, Alfred Tennyson, Thomas Babington Macaulay, and the Ingoldsby Legends.

At the Theatre Royal, Drury Lane, Montgomery replaced Samuel Phelps 6 March 1865 in Cymbeline, as Leonatus Posthumus to the Imogen of Helen Faucit, and in April, for the benefit of James Robertson Anderson, who acted Mark Antony, he played Cassius in Julius Caesar.'In July he undertook a temporary management of the Haymarket, at where, with Madge Robertson (Mrs. Kendal) as Ophelia, he appeared on the 29th as Hamlet, a moderate success. He also played Claude Melnotte in The Lady of Lyons, King John, Shylock, and Iago to the Othello of Ira Aldridge; and was the original Lorenzo in Fra Angelo, a tragedy in blank verse, by William Clark Russell, the not very successful experiment closing on 9 November.

In November 1866 Helen Faucit began a twelve nights' engagement at Drury Lane. There Montgomery was Orlando to her Rosalind, in As You Like It, and Sir Thomas Clifford in The Hunchback (James Sheridan Knowles) to her Julia.

== Last years ==
Montgomery made reputation in America and Australia, being well received as Louis XI and Sir Giles Overreach in A New Way to Pay Old Debts. On 31 July 1871 he began with Hamlet a short and unprosperous season at the Gaiety Theatre, in the course of which he played also Meg Merrilies (Guy Mannering). On 1 September, at 2 Stafford Street, Bond Street, he shot himself, while, according to the verdict given at an inquest, of unsound mind. He was buried in Brompton cemetery.

== Family ==
Montgomery married on 30 August 1871 Laleah Burpee Bigelow, an American.
