= Strathmore (play) =

1849 play

- Original language: English
- Written by: John Westland Marston
- Genre: Tragedy
- Setting: Scotland, 1670s

Premiere
- Date: 20 June 1849
- Place: Theatre Royal, Haymarket, London

Strathmore is an 1849 historical tragedy by the British writer John Westland Marston. It premiered at the Theatre Royal, Haymarket in London on 20 June 1849. The original cast included Charles Kean as Halbert Strathmore, Henry Hughes as Sir Rupert Lorn, Henry Howe as Bycefield, John Baldwin Buckstone as Roland, Ellen Kean as Katharine Lorn and Fanny Fitzwilliam as Janet. It is set during The Killing Time amidst repression of the Scottish Covenanter religious movement in the seventeenth century.

== Bibliography ==
- Nicoll, Allardyce. A History of Early Nineteenth Century Drama 1800-1850. Cambridge University Press, 1930.
- Rowell, George. Victorian Dramatic Criticism. Routledge, 2015.
