= Ingomar, the Barbarian =

1908 film directed by D. W. Griffith

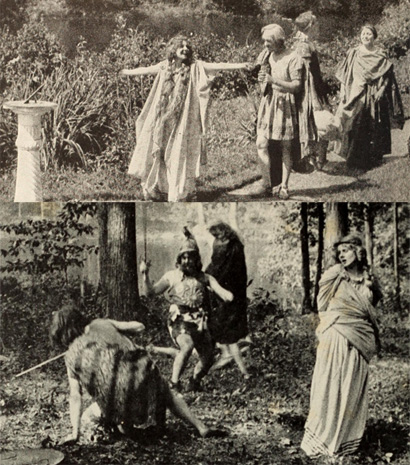
- Scenes from the film
- Directed by: D. W. Griffith
- Written by: D. W. Griffith; Ernest Thompson Seton
- Based on: Ingomar the Barbarian, play by Maria Ann Lovell from Der Sohn der Wildnis by Friedrich Halm
- Starring: Charles Inslee
- Cinematography: G. W. Bitzer
- Release date: October 13, 1908
- Running time: 13 minutes (one reel)
- Country: United States
- Language: Silent

Ingomar, the Barbarian is a 1908 American silent short drama film directed by D. W. Griffith. It has been placed in the same genre as the theatrical toga play. It is based on the play Der Sohn der Wildnis ("The Son of the Wilderness") by Friedrich Halm, translated by Maria Ann Lovell as Ingomar, the Barbarian.

== Plot ==
Parthenia seeks her father who is captured by barbarians. She starts the search alone and finds the barbarian camp. She is captured by the barbarians where Ingomar is the leader. The undaunted girl compels the admiration of Ingomar. He releases her father to seek for hidden money and keeps Parthenia as a hostage. She teaches him what love is. Ingomar at heart is “sterling”. At first amused, then interested he learns the true meaning of love. Admiration gives way to passion and Ingomar becomes her champion. Then there is a mutiny among the barbarians and they abduct Parthenia. Ingomar rescues her, forsakes his tribe and escorts Parthenia home where Polydor, an old suitor, starts trouble. He buys up the debt of her father and, because her father can’t pay his debts, demands Parthenia and her father to be slaves. Ingomar marvels at such “civilised” conduct and wants to kill Polydor. Parthenia prevents this and Ingomar offers himself in their place and Polydor accepts. When the barbarians besiege the city they think Ingomar is held against his will. Ingomar saves the city and Polydor is driven forth. Ingomar wins Parthenia and is made governor by the citizens.

== Cast ==
- Charles Inslee as Ingomar
- Harry Solter as Myron
- Florence Lawrence as Parthenia
- George Gebhardt as Polydor, the Merchant
- Linda Arvidson
- D. W. Griffith
- Arthur V. Johnson as Barbarian
- Wilfred Lucas
- Mack Sennett as Barbarian
