= Rosemary Barrow =

Welsh art historian

- Rosemary Barrow at Grove House, University of Roehampton
- Born: 9 April 1968; Skewen, South Wales
- Died: 21 September 2016 (aged 48)

Academic background
- Education: University of Leicester; King's College London
- Thesis: British classical-subject painting 1860–1910

Academic work
- Discipline: Art History
- Sub-discipline: Classical Reception Studies
- Institutions: University of Bristol; King's College London; University of Roehampton
- Notable works: Lawrence Alma-Tadema. Phaidon, London, 2001. ISBN 0714839183; The use of classical art and literature by Victorian painters, 1860–1912: Creating continuity with the traditions of high art. Edwin Mellen Press, Lewiston, New York, 2007. ISBN 978-0773454439

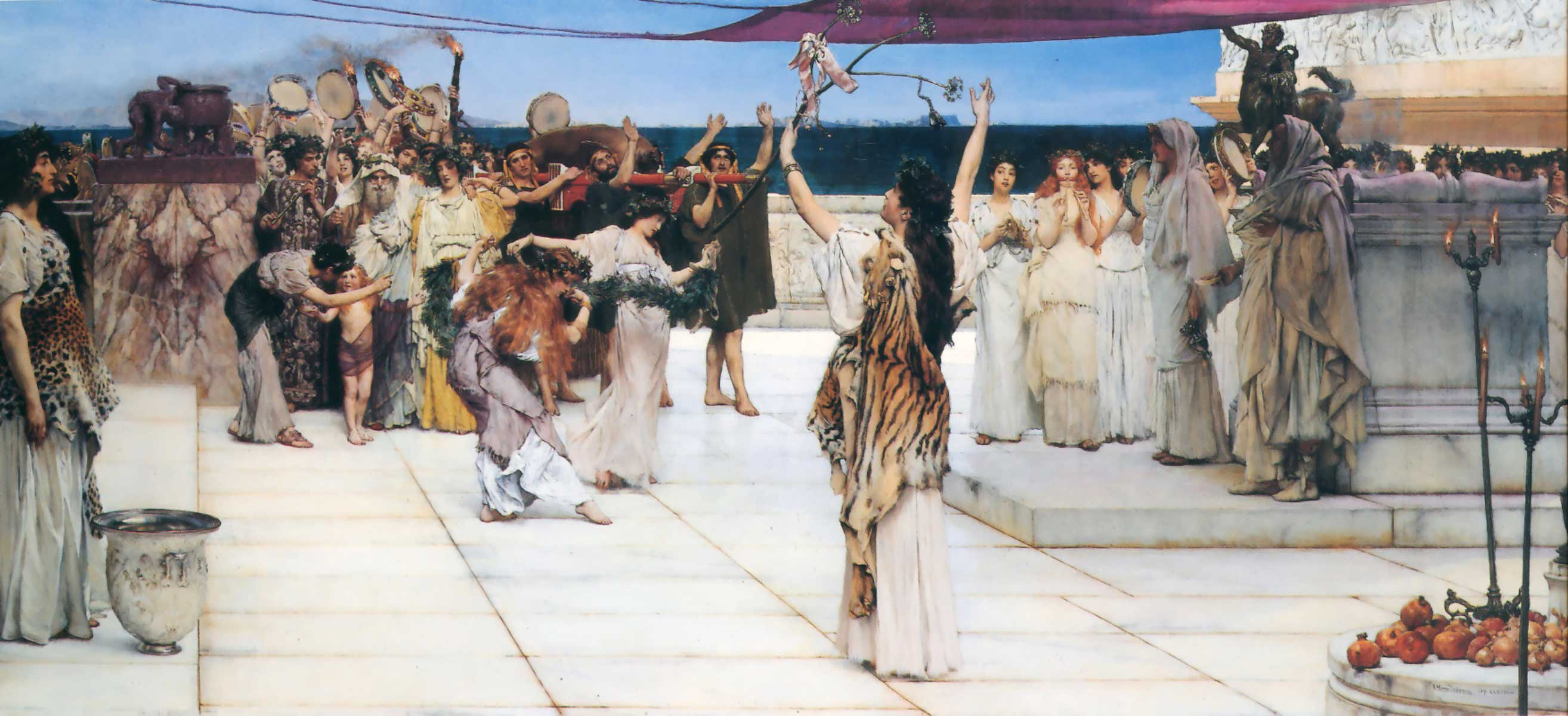
A dedication to Bacchus, Lawrence Alma-Tadema, Oil on Canvas, 1889, which featured on the cover of Barrow's book on the artist

Rosemary Julia Barrow (9 April 1968 – 21 September 2016) was a Welsh art historian who specialised in classical themes in Victorian art and the painting of Lawrence Alma-Tadema in particular, whose reputation she attempted to restore.

== Early life and education ==
Rosemary Barrow was born on 9 April 1968 in Skewen, south Wales, to Graham Barrow, a medical practitioner, and Jean Barrow, a housewife. Her father died when Rosemary was 18 months old and her mother remarried, to Antony Lewis who brought Rosemary up as his own child. She had two older siblings. Rosemary was educated first at a convent and from 16 at a local comprehensive school and received her B.A. from the University of Leicester. She then completed her PhD at King's College London in 1999 with a thesis on the subject of British classical-subject painting 1860–1910.

== Career ==
Barrow first lectured at the University of Bristol, where she was a Faculty of Arts Junior Research Fellow, and at King's College, London, where she was a lecturer in the School of Humanities, before becoming Reader in Classical Art and Reception at the University of Roehampton. She made her academic reputation with her insights into classical themes in Victorian art, beginning with her involvement in the exhibition of the work of the Dutch-born painter Lawrence Alma-Tadema at the Van Gogh Museum in Amsterdam. The exhibition subsequently moved to the Walker Art Gallery in Liverpool and then to New York. Barrow drew her ideas together in her book simply titled Lawrence Alma-Tadema (2001) in which she sought to rehabilitate Alma-Tadema's reputation which had been neglected for most of the twentieth century by arguing that he frequently used literary and archaeological allusions in his work to make subversive comments about apparently innocent subjects. This has come to be considered a definitive book on the subject.

In 2008, her book The use of classical art and literature by Victorian painters, 1860–1912 (2007), was described by Shelley Hales in Victorian Studies as "the first full overview of classical themes in Victorian art" and very useful for the undergraduate but suffering the consequences of being somewhat abbreviated with minimal footnoting and poor illustrations.

In 2010, Barrow contributed an essay on classicizing themes in the toga plays and tableaux vivants of London's late-Victorian and Edwardian popular stage shows to the Theatre Journal.

In 2014 The classical tradition: Art, literature, thought, co-written with Michael Silk and Ingo Gildenhard, was published. An edited extract from the book, ‘Wagner and the Classical Tradition: Ideas and Action’, won the 2013 AGPRD Ars Longa Prize. When diagnosed with cancer in 2015, she had recently begun work on her fourth book, Gender and the Body in Greek and Roman Art. She completed the first draft manuscript in the last months of her life, and it was published posthumously by Cambridge University Press.

She was a fellow of the Higher Education Academy, a member of the Classical Association, the College Art Association, the Hellenic Society, and the Classical Studies Reception Network.

At Roehampton, she taught modules on Classical Art, Classical reception in modern art, Classics and cinema, and Pompeii.

== Personal life ==
Barrow married her husband Mark Betz, a lecturer in film studies, in 2004 after they met at King's College. They divorced in 2010. She later met and formed a relationship with Ryan Cooper, who was 20 years younger than Barrow and had earlier been her student at Roehampton. Barrow was a vegetarian and practised Yoga. She was known for her individual sense of style which The Times attributed to her punk rock-influenced teenage years and which was evident in the videos she prepared for her students, some of which can be seen on the 'Athena Roehampton' YouTube channel.

Barrow was diagnosed with lung cancer on her 47th birthday, when she also decided to give up smoking. She died on 21 September 2016.

== Selected publications ==
- Lawrence Alma-Tadema. Phaidon, London, 2001. ISBN 0714839183
- The use of classical art and literature by Victorian painters, 1860–1912: Creating continuity with the traditions of high art. Edwin Mellen Press, Lewiston, New York, 2007. ISBN 978-0773454439
- "Toga plays and tableaux vivants: Theatre and painting on London's late-Victorian and Edwardian popular stage", Theatre Journal, Vol. 62, No. 2 (May 2010), pp. 209–226.
- The classical tradition: Art, literature, thought. Wiley-Blackwell, Chichester, 2014. (With Michael Silk and Ingo Gildenhard) ISBN 978-1405155496
- Gender, Identity and the Body in Greek and Roman Sculpture, Cambridge University Press, 2018
