= Glencoe (play) =

1840 play

- Original language: English
- Written by: Thomas Talfourd
- Genre: Tragedy
- Setting: Scotland, 1690s

Premiere
- Date: 23 June 1840
- Place: Theatre Royal, Haymarket, London

Glencoe; or, the Fate of the Macdonalds is a historical tragedy by the British writer Thomas Talfourd. It premiered at the Theatre Royal, Haymarket on 23 June 1840. The cast included William Macready as Halbert MacDonald, Helena Faucit as Helen Campbell, Henry Howe as Henry MacDonald, Benjamin Webster as MacIan, Samuel Phelps as Captain Robert Campbell, Priscilla Horton as Alaster MacDonald, Walter Lacy as Lindsay and Mary Warner as Lady MacDonald. Talfourd dedicated the published version to the literary critic Lord Jeffrey. It was revived at the Surrey Theatre in October 1849.

It is inspired by the Massacre of Glencoe which took place in 1692 the wake of a failed Jacobite Rising in Scotland. The current dispute between Jacobites and supporters of William III is subsumed into the long-standing rivalry between the MacDonalds and their arch-enemies the Campbells.

== Bibliography ==
- Macqueen-Pope, Walter. Haymarket: Theatre of Perfection. W.H. Allen, 1948.
- Nicoll, Allardyce. A History of Early Nineteenth Century Drama 1800-1850. Cambridge University Press, 1930.
