= Ion (Talfourd play) =

1836 play

- Original language: English
- Written by: Thomas Talfourd
- Genre: Tragedy

Premiere
- Date: 26 May 1836
- Place: Theatre Royal, Covent Garden, London

Ion, a Tragedy is a tragedy by the British writer Thomas Talfourd. Published in 1835, it was first performed at the Theatre Royal, Covent Garden in London on 26 May 1836. The Covent Garden cast included William Macready as Ion, Ellen Tree (and subsequently Helena Faucit) as Clemanthe, John Vandenhoff as Adrastus, King of Argos, Charles Thompson as Medon, George John Bennett as Phocion, Henry John Wallack as Ctesiphon, John Langford Pritchard as Agenor, Harriette Deborah Lacy as Abra.

== Bibliography ==
- Nicoll, Allardyce. A History of Early Nineteenth Century Drama 1800-1850. Cambridge University Press, 1930.
- Woolford, John & Karlin, Daniel (ed.) The Poems of Browning: Volume Two: 1841-1846. Routledge, 2014.
