= William Creswick =

English actor

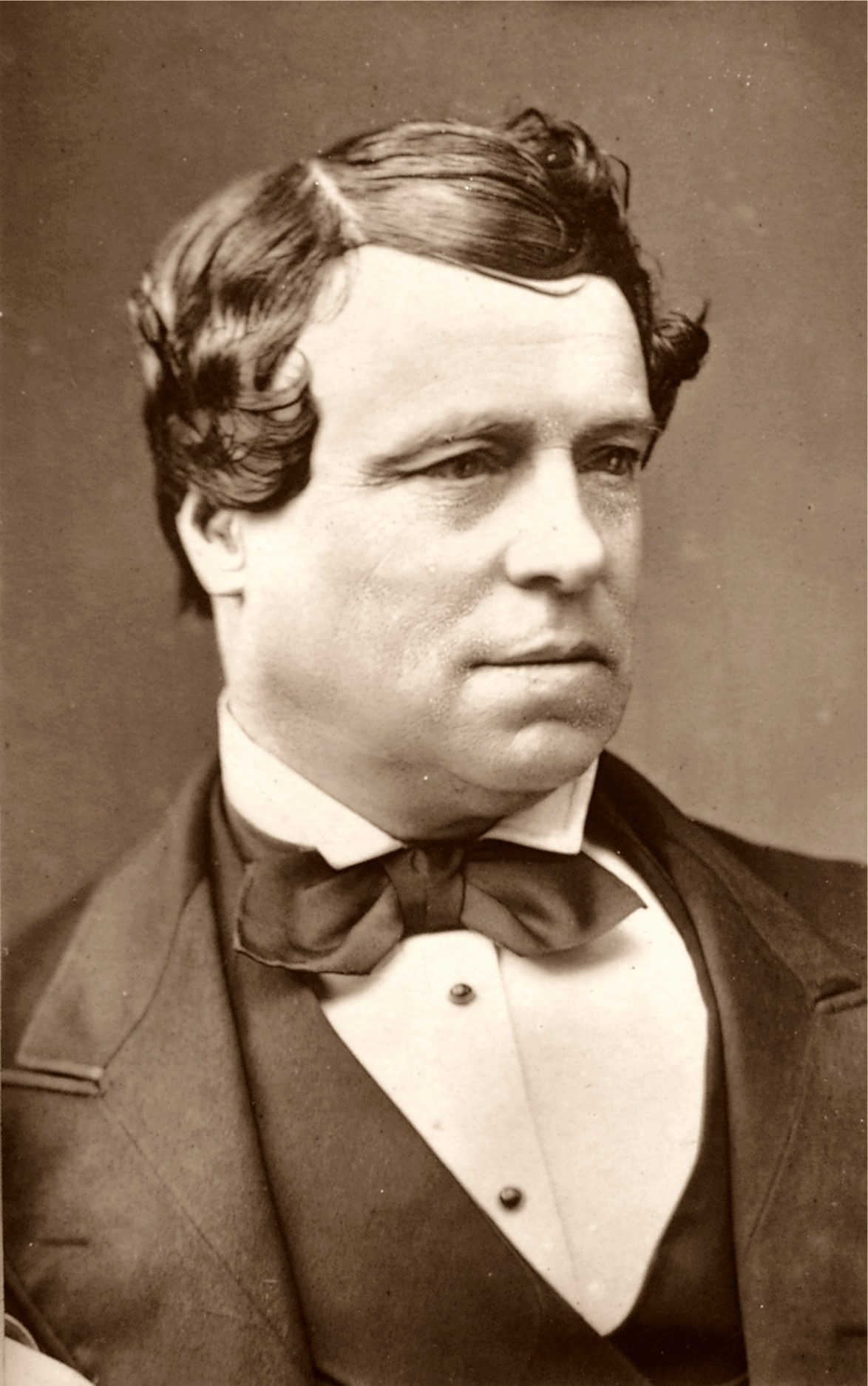
- Born: 27 December 1813; Covent Garden, London, England
- Died: 17 June 1888 (aged 74); Kennington, London, England
- Occupation: Actor

William Creswick (27 December 1813 – 17 June 1888) was an English actor. A popular tragedian on the London stage, he appeared with many leading actors of his day, including William Charles Macready, Edwin Booth and Fanny Kemble and was well known for his Shakespearean and melodrama roles in Britain, the U.S. and Australia.

== Early years ==
Creswick was born near Covent Garden, London. He was intended for a mercantile career, but the death of his father when Creswick was 17 left him free to follow his theatrical vocation.

Under the name of "Master Collins" Creswick appeared in 1831 at a theatre in the East End, playing an Italian boy as a victim of "burking" (murder with the motive of selling the victim's body to anatomists). He appeared with travelling companies in Suffolk and Kent and then played leading roles in the north of England. There, in 1834, he met Elizabeth Page (1809–1876), whose stage name was Miss Paget, whom subsequently he married. His next appearance in London was at the Queen's Theatre, Tottenham Street on 16 February 1835, as Horace Meredith in Douglas William Jerrold's comedy, Schoolfellows.

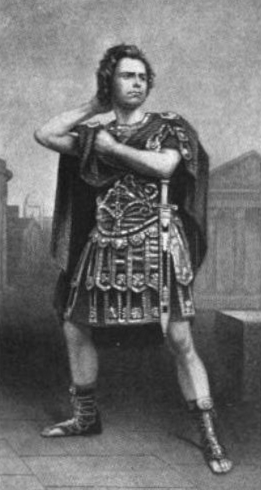
As Coriolanus

Returning to touring in York, he played the leading part in Ion, continuing to tour in the provinces. In April 1839, he appeared at the Lyceum Theatre, London, first in Silver Crescent. In 1839, Creswick and his wife travelled to the U.S., staying for nearly four years, where Creswick greatly increased his reputation. They began with engagements in New York and then joined the company of the Tremont Theatre in Boston for the season of 1840-41, afterwards touring throughout North America. Upon their return to England, Creswick resumed touring in the North.

On 25 July 1846 Creswick joined Samuel Phelps's company at Sadler's Wells, playing Hotspur and other parts. At the Princess's Theatre in April 1847, he played Master Walter in The Hunchback to Fanny Kemble's Julia, and subsequently supported her in other roles. At the same theatre he played with William Charles Macready, opposite whom his Shakespearean roles included Cassius, Macduff and Edgar. Creswick was engaged for three years at the Haymarket Theatre, where he first appeared in July 1847 as Claude Melnotte to the Pauline of Helen Faucit in The Lady of Lyons by Edward Bulwer-Lytton. In October of that year he was the first Vivian Temple in Westland Marston's Heart and the World. He was also seen as True-worth in The Love Chase, Mordaunt in The Patrician's Daughter, Proteus in Two Gentlemen of Verona (December 1848), the Ghost in Hamlet, and Cassio in Othello.

== Later years ==
In 1849, Creswick, in partnership with Richard Shepherd took over the management of the Surrey Theatre, opening as Alasco in James Sheridan Knowles's The Rose of Arragon. At the Surrey he appeared for three years in roles including the Stranger, Virginius, Richelieu and Hamlet, and in February 1849, he was the first Laroque in Henry Fothergill Chorley's Old Love and New Fortune. He was also seen as Damon in Damon and Pythias, Adam Bede, and other roles. He starred as Count Fosco in the 1860 dramatization of "The Woman in White" at the Surrey Theatre. Retiring from management in 1862, he played at Drury Lane and other theatres as Othello, Iago, Macbeth, and Iachimo. Rejoining Shepherd in 1866, he played Martin Truegold in Angiolo Robson Slous's nautical drama, True to the Core.

In 1871 Creswick made a second trip to America, appearing first as Joe, the idiot foundling, in Watts Phillips's Nobody's Child, a part in which he had been seen at the Surrey Theatre in 1867, and played with Charlotte Cushman and Edwin Booth. Upon his return to England, he appeared with Phelps, at Drury Lane for several years. In 1877, after being given a benefit at the Gaiety Theatre, in which he played Macbeth, he went to Australia, where he opened in Melbourne in the title role of Sheridan Knowles's Virginius, and was enthusiastically received. He repeated this role at the Surrey upon his return to England, also playing at the Standard and other theatres thereafter.

Creswick was a founder member and governor of the Shakespeare Memorial Association in Stratford-upon-Avon, where he acted in the festival of 1883, playing Falstaff, Lear and Shylock. For his farewell benefit he appeared at Drury Lane on 29 October 1885, in a scene from King Lear, as part of a miscellaneous entertainment in which others appearing included Henry Irving, Wilson Barrett, George Grossmith, Lionel Brough, William Farren Jr., John Martin Harvey and George Alexander.

Creswick died at his home in Kennington on 17 June 1888, a few days after a severe fall. He was buried at Kensal Green Cemetery on 22 June 1888. The Dictionary of National Biography said of him in 1901,

He belonged to the old-fashioned and oratorical school, of which he was one of the last survivors. He was popular in tragedy, and won acceptance in melodrama, but had little subtlety or insight.

The Era said of him,

He was everywhere recognised as a most intelligent and estimable companion, a scholarly critic of dramatic literature and a deeply read Shakespearian student.
