= Ellen Kean =

19th-century English actress

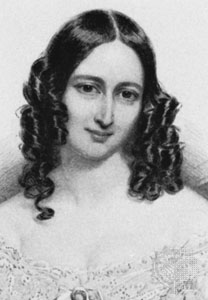
- 1844 engraving of Kean
- Born: Eleanora Tree; 12 December 1805
- Died: 20 August 1880 (aged 74); Bayswater, City of Westminster, England
- Occupation: Actress
- Spouse: Charles Kean (m. 1842; died 1868)

Ellen Kean (12 December 1805 – 20 August 1880) was an English actress. She was known as Ellen Tree until her marriage in 1842, after which she was known both privately and professionally as Mrs Charles Kean and always appeared in productions together with her husband.

== Biography ==
=== Early years ===
Ellen Kean was born Eleanora Tree, the third of four daughters of Cornelius Tree, an official of the East India Company in London. Her three sisters became actresses, but, unlike Ellen, retired from the stage when they married. Her professional stage debut was in a musical version of Twelfth Night in London in 1822 as Olivia alongside her sister Maria as Viola. She gained experience touring in the provinces, and from 1826 was a regular member of the companies at the Drury Lane and Haymarket Theatres, making a success in The Wonder and The Youthful Queen. At Covent Garden she took on the roles of Shakespeare's Romeo to the Juliet of Fanny Kemble, Françoise de Foix in Francis the First, and Lady Townley in The Provoked Husband.

=== Leading lady ===
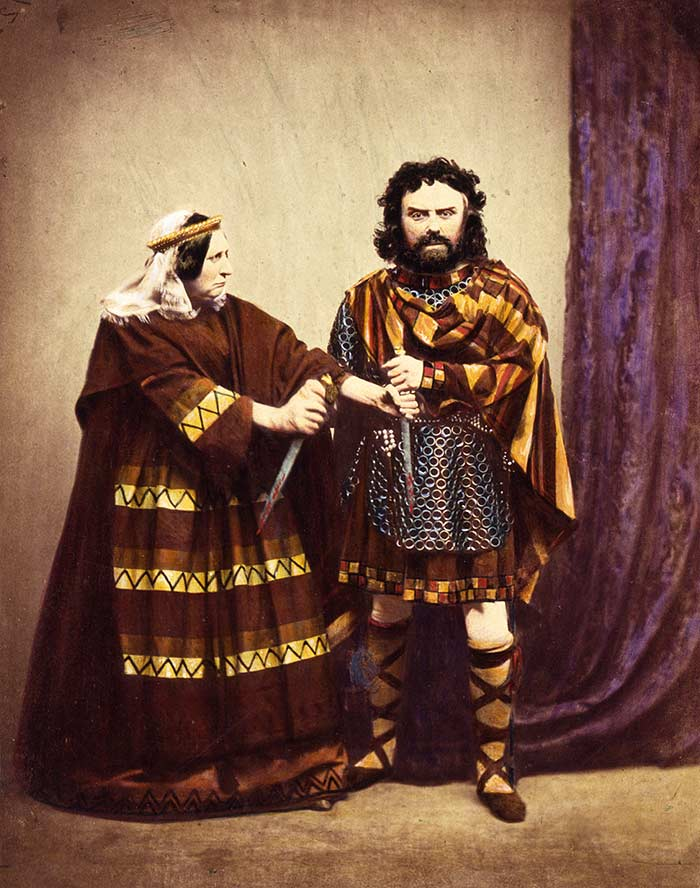
Ellen and Charles Kean in Macbeth

In 1832, by now established as a leading actress, Tree accepted an engagement in Hamburg, Germany, where a junior member of the company was Charles Kean. He had made an undistinguished debut at Drury Lane in 1827, and he and Tree had acted together in 1828 in a play called Lovers' Vows and later in Othello. In the German season they fell in love, but were persuaded by family and friends not to marry in haste. Tree returned to London and resumed her successful West End career, including a considerable success in Ion in another breeches role. At the end of 1836, Tree went to America, where she toured in Shakespeare for more than three years, playing heroines such as Rosalind, Viola and Beatrice, among other roles. By the time of her return to England in 1839, she had made a profit of £12,000 on the tour, equivalent to at least £1 million in modern terms.

By 1841 Charles Kean had established himself as a successful actor, and he and Tree appeared together in Romeo and Juliet at the Haymarket Theatre. They were married the next year, and she at once switched her professional name from Ellen Tree to Mrs Charles Kean. For the next nine years they appeared together at the Haymarket, completing a tour of William Shaftoe Robertson's Lincoln Circuit in 1845, where she gave 'an exquisite impersonation' of Miss Halley in The Stranger, and in The Honey Moon she was described as 'perfectly inimitable'; they attracted profitable houses before making a joint visit to the U.S. in 1846. In 1850, Kean took over the management of the Princess's Theatre in London. The Times called this "the most important period of Mrs Kean's career.... Hitherto she had been the Rosalind and the Viola of the stage; henceforward her name was to be associated with characters of a more matronly type" in roles including Lady Macbeth and Gertrude in Hamlet. The same writer also credited her for "the good taste and artistic completeness" of Kean's productions. Ellen Terry, who made her first stage appearance as the boy Mamillius in The Winter's Tale, remembered Kean "as Hermione wearing a Greek wreath round her head and a crinoline with many layers of petticoats."

=== Last years ===
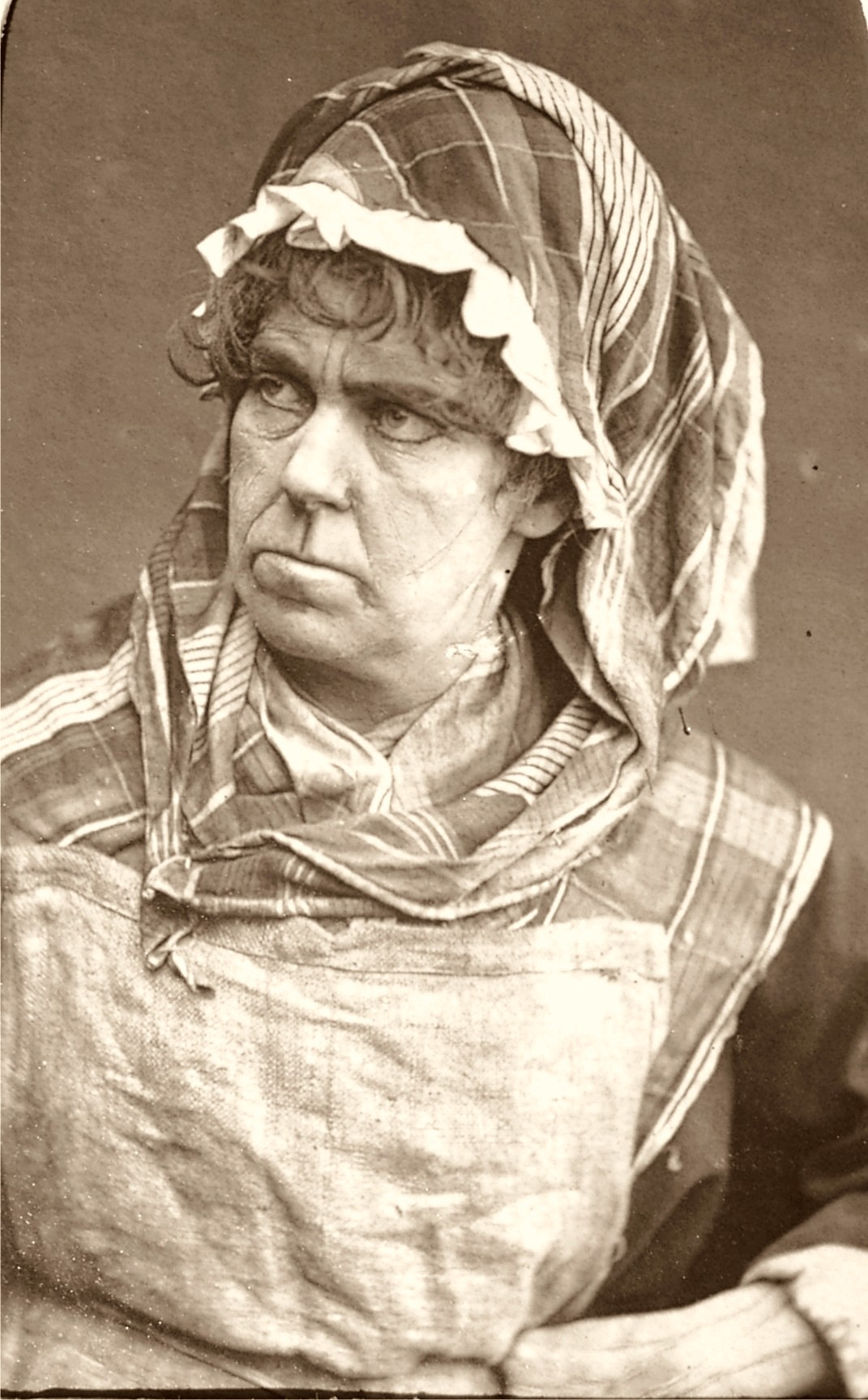
Ellen Kean

Charles Kean died in 1868, and his widow retired from the stage, living quietly in Bayswater, in the City of Westminster, where she died, aged 73. The Times in its obituary said, "Mrs Kean is not to be numbered with the greatest votaries of the English stage, but her acting was distinguished by considerable power, tenderness and refinement." She was buried in a vault alongside her husband at Catherington, Hampshire.

== Selected roles ==
- Georgiana in Forget and Forgive by James Kenney (1827)
- Blanche of Bourbon in Don Pedro, King of Castile by Lord Porchester (1828)
- Francois de Foix in Francis the First by Fanny Kemble (1832)
- Mariana in The Wife by James Sheridan Knowles (1833)
- Myrrha in Sardanapalus by Lord Byron (1834)
- Christine in The Minister and the Mercer by Alfred Bunn (1834)
- Clemanthe in Ion by Thomas Talfourd (1836)
- Constance in The Provost of Bruges by George William Lovell (1836)
- Louise de la Vallière in The Duchess de la Vallière by Edward Bulwer-Lytton (1837)
- Countess in Love by James Sheridan Knowles (1839)
- Olivia in The Rose of Arragon by James Sheridan Knowles (1842)
- Lady Eveline Amyott in The Wife's Secret by George William Lovell (1846)
- Katharine Lorn in Strathmore by John Westland Marston (1849)
- Anne Blake in Anne Blake by John Westland Marston (1852)
