= George William Lovell =

English dramatist and novelist

George William Lovell (1804 – 13 May 1878) was an English dramatist and novelist. His most successful play was The Wife's Secret, staged at the Haymarket Theatre with Charles Kean and his wife Ellen in the principal roles, and revived several times.

== Life ==
Lovell was for many years secretary of the Phœnix Insurance Company, but devoted his leisure to writing plays. His first play was The Avenger, produced at the Surrey Theatre in 1835, when Samuel Butler represented the chief character. This was followed by The Provost of Bruges, with William Macready as the hero, at Covent Garden in February 1836. The play was founded on The Serf, a story in Leitch Ritchie's Romance of History, and attained great popularity.

A novel, The Trustee, appeared in 1841, and further advanced Lovell's literary fame; Love's Sacrifice, or the Rival Merchants, a five-act drama, was brought out at Covent Garden in September 1842, under Charles Kemble's management, and the comedy Look Before You Leap, at the Haymarket Theatre in October 1846.

Lovell's most famous play, The Wife's Secret, was purchased by Charles Kean for £400 before a line of it was written. It was originally produced at the Park Theatre, New York, in October 1846, and was brought out in London at the Haymarket in January 1848, when it ran for 36 nights, with Mr and Mrs Kean in the principal roles. There were revivals in 1850 at the Princess's Theatre and in 1861 at Drury Lane, with further revivals during the following years. After Kean's death in 1868, Lovell wrote a new version of the play that was published in 1869. A reviewer of the original London production wrote that the play "is a plain story effectively told, with the advantage that the ruling sentiment, though often treated before, is one that is sure to appeal to a large portion of an audience." (The Times, 18 January 1848.)

His last drama was The Trial of Love, acted at the Princess's Theatre in January 1852, with Mr and Mrs Kean in the lead roles; it ran for 23 nights.

Lovell married in 1830 Maria Ann Lacy, an actress. On her marriage she retired from the stage, and wrote the plays Ingomar the Barbarian and The Beginning and the End.

The majority of Lovell's dramatic pieces were printed. He died at his home in Hampstead, London on 13 May 1878, in his seventy-fifth year. He left at least one daughter and one son, William Henry Lovell.
