= The Wife (play) =

1833 play

- Original language: English
- Written by: James Sheridan Knowles
- Genre: Historical drama

Premiere
- Date: 24 April 1833
- Place: Theatre Royal, Covent Garden, London

The Wife: A Tale of Mantua (also known as The Wife of Mantua is an 1833 historical play by the Irish writer James Sheridan Knowles. It premiered at the Theatre Royal, Covent Garden in London on 24 April 1833. The cast included Sheridan Knowles as Julian St. Pierre, Ellen Kean as Mariana, Charles Kean as Leonardo, James Prescott Warde as Ferrardo, George Bennett as Antonio, William Abbot as Lorenzo, Edwin Ransford as Hugo, Drinkwater Meadows as Bartolo and William Payne as Pietro. The epilogue was written by Charles Lamb. It is set in Mantua during the reign of the House of Gonzaga.

== Bibliography ==
- Meeks, Leslie Howard. Sheridan Knowles: And the Theatre of His Time. Principia Press, Incorporated, 1933.
- Marshall, Gail. Shakespeare in the Nineteenth Century. Cambridge University Press, 2012.
- Nicoll, Allardyce. A History of Early Nineteenth Century Drama 1800-1850. Cambridge University Press, 1930.
