= Francis the First (play) =

1832 play

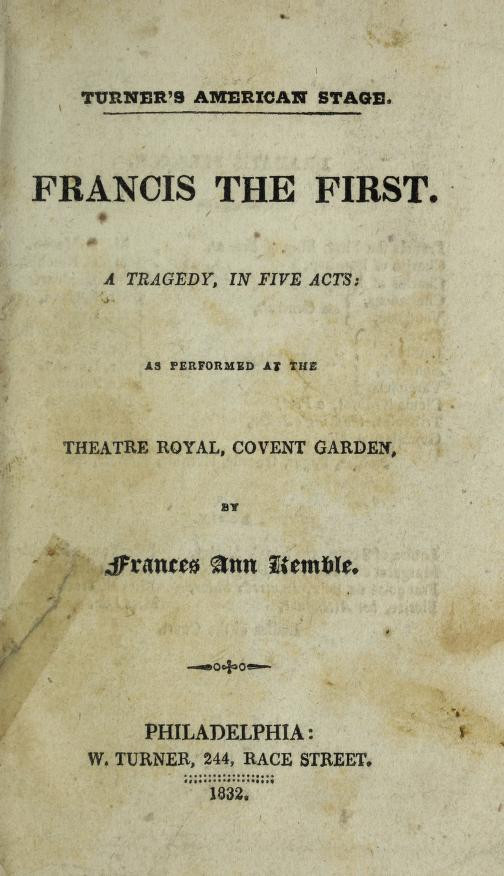
- Original language: English
- Written by: Fanny Kemble
- Genre: Tragedy
- Setting: Kingdom of France, 16th century

Premiere
- Date: 15 March 1832
- Place: Theatre Royal, Covent Garden, London

Francis the First is an 1832 historical tragedy written by the British actress Fanny Kemble. It is based on the reign of Francis I of France in the sixteenth century. It premiered at the Theatre Royal, Covent Garden in London on 15 March 1832. The original cast included Kemble herself as Louisa of Savoy, Mason as Francis the First, Charles Kemble as Charles of Bourbon, Daniel Egerton as Chabannes, George Bennett as Laval, William Abbot as Clement Marot, Robert Keeley as Triboulet, John Duruset as Bonnivet, James Prescott Warde as Gonzales, Harriette Taylor as Margaret Valois and Ellen Kean as Francois de Foix. Kemble had originally conceived it as a historical novel before converting it into a stage play. Kemble was paid a large sum for the rights by publisher John Murray, and it enjoyed brief success on stage, although she herself was later critical of its "stilted declamation"

== Bibliography ==
- David, Deirdre. Fanny Kemble: A Performed Life, Philadelphia. University of Pennsylvania, 2007
- Nicoll, Allardyce. A History of Early Nineteenth Century Drama 1800-1850. Cambridge University Press, 1930.
