= The Hunchback (play) =

1832 play

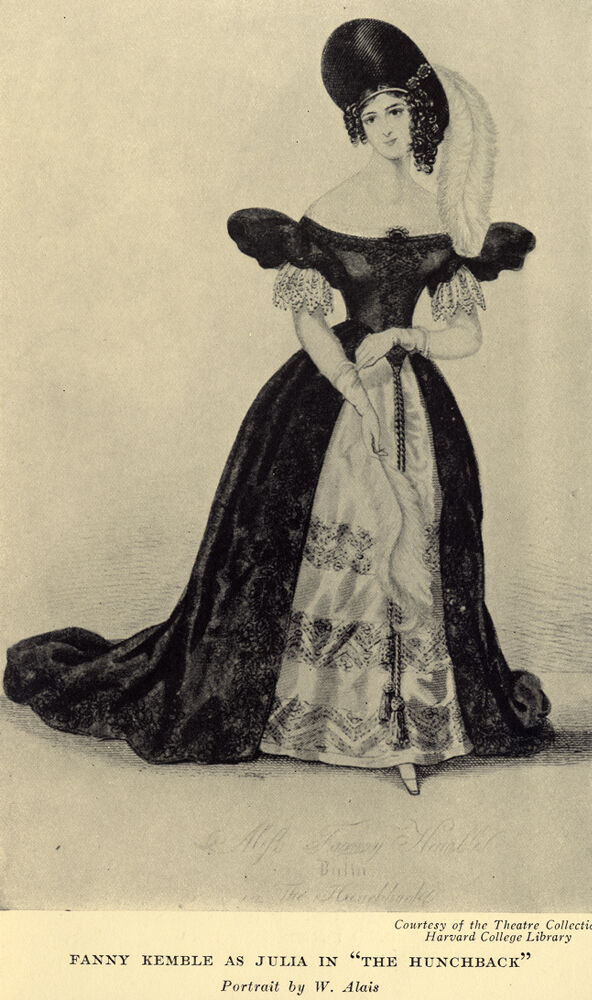
- Original language: English
- Written by: James Sheridan Knowles
- Genre: Comedy
- Setting: England, present day

Premiere
- Date: 5 April 1832
- Place: Theatre Royal, Covent Garden, London

The Hunchback is an 1832 comedy play by the Irish writer James Sheridan Knowles. Knowles wrote it in the wake of the disastrous reception of his previous comedy The Beggar's Daughter of Bethnal Green in 1828. It premiered at the Theatre Royal, Covent Garden in London's West End on 5 April 1832. The cast included Sheridan Knowles himself as Master Walter, Fanny Kemble as Julia, Hariette Taylor as Helen, Charles Kemble as Sir Thomas Clifford, Benjamin Wrench as Lord Tinsel, William Abbot as Modus, Drinkwater Meadows as Fathom and William Payne as Stephen. It was Fanny Kemble's last performance in England before embarking on a tour of the United States with her father, where she married and retired from the stage.

The Hunchback was staged on Broadway at the Garrick Theatre in 1902 with a cast led by Eben Plympton as Master Walter, Viola Allen as Julia, Adelaide Prince as Helen, Aubrey Boucicault as Sir Thomas Clifford, J. Harry Benrimo as Lord Tinsel, Jameson Lee Finney as Modus, and C. Leslie Allen as Fathom.

== Bibliography ==
- Nicoll, Allardyce. A History of Early Nineteenth Century Drama 1800-1850. Cambridge University Press, 1930.
