= Love's Sacrifice (Lovell play) =

1842 play

- Original language: English
- Written by: George William Lovell
- Genre: Drama
- Setting: Palais-Royal, Paris

Premiere
- Date: 12 September 1842
- Place: Theatre Royal, Covent Garden, London

Love's Sacrifice is an 1842 play by the British writer George William Lovell. It premiered at the Theatre Royal, Covent Garden on 12 September 1842. The original cast included John Vandenhoff as Matthew Elmore, Walter Lacy as St. Lo, Alfred Wigan as Morluc, William Payne as Du Viray, Drinkwater Meadows as Jean Ruse, Charlotte Vandenhoff as Margaret, Harriette Deborah Lacy as Herminie de Vermont. It opened at the Bowery Theatre in New York the following year. It was well known in America by the 1850s.

== Bibliography ==
- Grossman, Barbara Wallace. A Spectacle of Suffering: Clara Morris on the American Stage. SIU Press, 2009.
- Nicoll, Allardyce. A History of Early Nineteenth Century Drama 1800-1850. Cambridge University Press, 1930.
