= The Wife's Secret =

1846 play

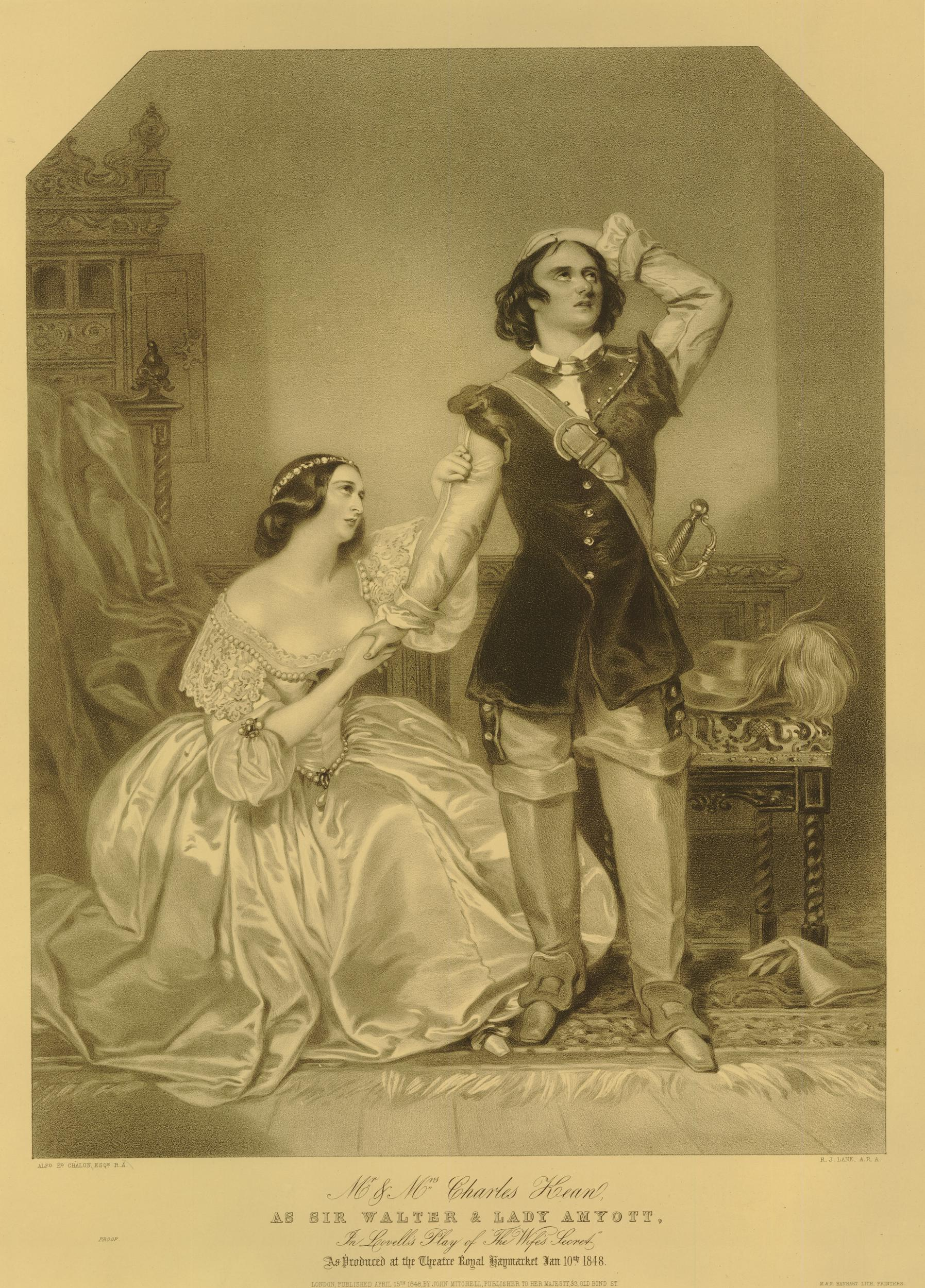
- Charles and Ellen Kean in their roles in 1848.
- Original language: English
- Written by: George William Lovell
- Genre: Historical
- Setting: Dorset, 1655

Premiere
- Date: 12 October 1846
- Place: Park Theatre, New York City

The Wife's Secret is an 1846 historical play by the British writer George William Lovell. The play takes place in Dorset during the rule of Oliver Cromwell after the English Civil War. It premiered at the Park Theatre in Manhattan on 12 October 1846 with Charles Kean in the lead. It made its London debut at the Theatre Royal, Haymarket on 17 January 1848. The Haymarket cast included Charles Kean as Sir Walter Aymott, Henry Howe as Lord Arden, Ellen Kean as Lady Eveline Amyott, Benjamin Nottingham Webster as Jabez Sneed and Mary Anne Keeley as Maud. The Times praised Ellen Kean's performance, noting "the wife, is played to perfection".

Kean bought the rights to the drama, but after his death in 1868, Ellen Kean sold the copyright to Lovell. Afterwards, Lovell revisited The Wife's Secret and made a number of alterations and additions to the play; the new version was published and publicly performed for the first time in 1869.

== Plot ==
Although various aspects of the play differ between the 1846 and 1869 versions of the text, the general plot remains the same:

Lady Eveline discovers that her servant, Jabez Sneed, has been stealing money from her and reprimands him. Shortly thereafterwards, she finds herself hiding her brother, Lord Arden, in her house after he and his fellow Cavaliers are defeated in their attempt to overthrow the Commonwealth of England. While Lady Eveline posits that her husband, Sir Walter, though a Parliamentarian, will have mercy on her brother if he reveals himself, Lord Arden insists on remaining hidden, as he fears that Sir Walter will have him arrested if he discovers him. Through Jabez's prompting, Sir Walter comes to suspect that Lady Eveline is keeping a lover hidden in the house, and threatens to kill him. Lady Eveline reveals the truth and Sir Walter, although sceptical at first, comes to believe her, and decides to protect Lord Arden. Jabez Sneed attempts to escape arrest for theft and flee by boarding a ship- but his plot is discovered by Sir Walter, who plans to report him to the authorities.

== Novelization ==
In 1848, The Wife's Secret was novelized as a short story of the same name in the serial, and later anthology, Tales of the Drama, along with other dramatic works that appeared on the London stage in the late 1840s.

== Bibliography ==
- Nicoll, Allardyce. A History of Early Nineteenth Century Drama 1800-1850. Cambridge University Press, 1930.
- Pascoe, Charles Eyre. Our Actors and Actresses. The Dramatic List. David Bogue, 1880.
- Taylor, George. Players and Performances in the Victorian Theatre. Manchester University Press, 1993.
- Lovell, George. The Wife's Secret. Samuel French, 1869.
