= Look Before You Leap =

1846 play

- Original language: English
- Written by: George William Lovell
- Genre: Comedy
- Setting: Oxford, Present day

Premiere
- Date: 29 October 1846
- Place: Theatre Royal, Haymarket, London

Look Before You Leap is an 1846 comedy play by the British writer George William Lovell. It premiered at the Theatre Royal, Haymarket in London's West End on 29 October 1846. The cast included Henry Howe as Brandon, John Baldwin Buckstone as Tom Tilly, William Farren as Mr. Oddington, Benjamin Nottingham Webster as Jack Spriggs, Julia Glover as Miss Brown, Priscilla Horton as Mary Oddington, Mrs Edwin Yarnold as Elinor Mortimer, Julia Bennett as Fanny Hardman.

== Bibliography ==
- Nicoll, Allardyce. A History of Early Nineteenth Century Drama 1800-1850. Cambridge University Press, 1930.
- Sargent, Epes. The Modern Standard Drama: A Collection of the Most Popular Acting Plays, with Critical Remarks. J. Douglas, 1847.
