= Drinkwater Meadows =

English actor (1799–1869)

Drinkwater Meadows (1799 – 12 June 1869) was an English actor.

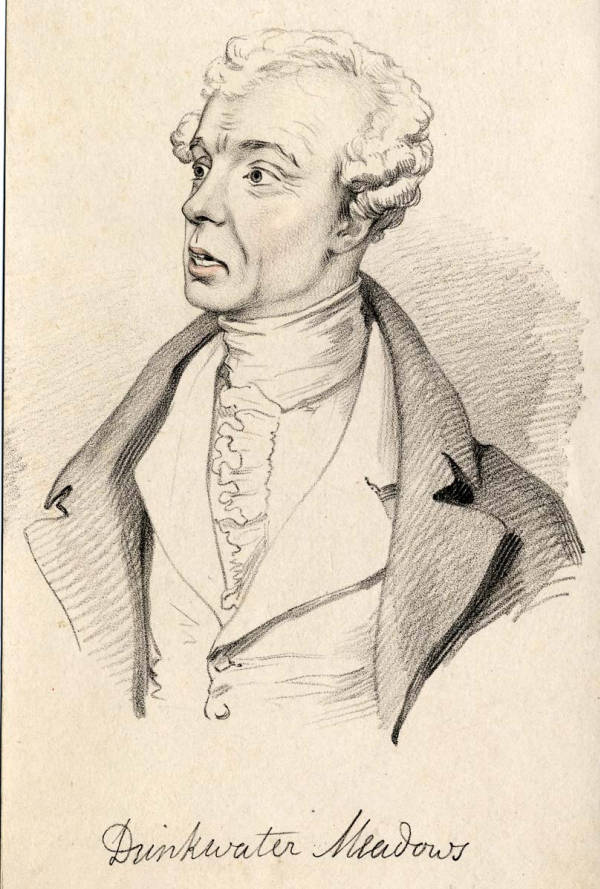
Portrait of Drinkwater Meadows

== Biography ==
Meadows was a native of Yorkshire, or, according to another account, of Wales, born in 1799, joined a theatrical company established in Kendal, and played in various towns in Westmoreland and Yorkshire. Subsequently he became member of a second company, playing in Lincoln, Leicester, Peterborough, and Birmingham, at which last named town he was seen and engaged by Charlton, the manager of the Bath Theatre. Meadows made his first appearance at Bath on 4 November 1817 as Fogrum, Liston's part, in Morton's musical drama "The Slave." He played on the 24th Scrub in the "Beaux Stratagem," and on 6 December Clincher, jun., in The Constant Couple The following season he was Hempseed in the younger Colman's "X. Y. Z.," Simon in the "Rendezvous," Molino in the "Blind Boy," Adam Winterton in "The Iron Chest," Solomon Lob in "Love Laughs at Locksmiths," and Old Philpot in the "Citizen;" in 1819–20 Ratcliffe in the "Heart of Midlothian," First Gravedigger in "Hamlet" to Kean's Hamlet, Slender in the "Merry Wives of Windsor," Dromio of Syracuse, Clod in the "Young Quaker," and in 1820–1 Peter in the "Stranger," Laurence in the "Fate of Calas," Peter Pastoral, and Interpreter in "All's well that ends well." On 28 September 1821, as Scrub, he made his first appearance at Covent Garden. Here he played his old characters, replaced Liston, the original Dugald Dalgetty, in Pocock's "Montrose, or the Children of the Mist," and was seen as Crabtree in the "School for Scandal," and Filch in the "Beggar's Opera."

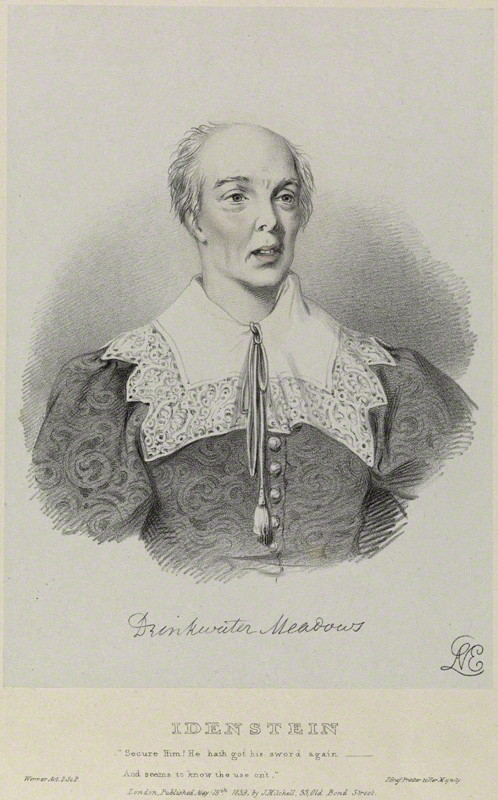
Drinkwater Meadows as Idenstein in "Werner".

In following seasons he was, among other characters, Don Pedro in the "Wonder," the original Timothy Quaint in Howard Payne's "Soldier's Daughter," Pacheco in "Brother and Sister," the original Nimpedo in "Clari, or the Maid of Milan" (8 May 1823), Fainwou'd in "Raising the Wind," Baron Altradoff in the "Exile," Blaise in the "Forest of Bondy, or the Dog of Montargis," the original Spado in "Pride shall have a Fall," attributed to Croly (11 March 1824), Jaquez in the "Honeymoon," Sampson in "Isabella," Jeffrey in "Animal Magnetism," Launcelot Gobbo, Medium in "Inkle and Yarico," Stephen in "Every Man in his Humour," Baron Piffleberg in "Of Age Tomorrow," the original Robin in Poole's "Scapegoat" (25 November 1825), Simon Pure in "A Bold Stroke for a Wife," Shallow in the "Merry Wives of Windsor," Squire Richard in Cibber's "The Provoked Husband," the original Raubvogel in Planché's "Returned Killed" (31 October 1826), Apothecary in "Romeo and Juliet," the original Salewit, a poet, in Planché's "Merchant's Wedding" (5 February 1828), adapted from "A City Match" by Jasper Mayne, the original Oliver in Moncrieff's "Somnambulist" (19 February 1828), Heeltap in "The Mayor of Garratt," Marrall in "A New Way to pay Old Debts," Thomas Appletree in the "Recruiting Officer," the original Bronze in Pocock's "Home, Sweet Home" (19 March 1829), Tester in the "Suspicious Husband," the original Torpid in the "Night before the Wedding and the Wedding Night" (17 November 1829), and the original Jotham Riddel in "Wigwam, or the Men of the Wilderness," founded on the "Pioneers" of Cooper.

From the close of Genest's "History" Meadows is not easily traced. At Covent Garden he remained until 1844, being the original Fathom in Sheridan Knowles's "Hunchback" in 1832, and the following year the original Bartolo in the "Wife" of the same author. He was on 10 February 1836 at Drury Lane, the original Philippe in Lovell's The Provost of Bruges but returned to Covent Garden, where in September 1842 he made a success as a miserly old clerk in Lovell's Love Sacrifice played one of the witches in "Macbeth," was the original Gallop, a trainer, in Mark Lemon's farce the "Turf," and played in Robert Bell's "Mothers and Daughters." In 1844 he acted under the Keeley management at the Lyceum (1844–7), and remained under the succeeding management of C. Mathews. At the revival of the "Merry Wives of Windsor" in December 1848 he was Sir Hugh Evans. After joining the Kean and Keeley management of the Princess's he was the original Boaz in Douglas Jerrold's "Prisoner of War," first given at Windsor Castle, under Charles Kean's direction, on 24 January 1851; on 6 March was the original Joe Harrup, a toothless old huntsman, in Boucicault's "Love in a Maze," and on 22 November 1852 played "Shallow" in the "Merry Wives of Windsor." He remained at the Princess's under Harris until his retirement in 1862. He died at Prairie Cottage, the Green, Barnes, on 12 June 1869, one account says at the age of seventy-five. A careful, retiring man, shunning publicity, he was much respected and little noticed. A careful, conscientious, and trustworthy actor, he was lacking in inspiration, homely, dry, and quaint in style, and seen to most advantage in eccentric comedy. In a catalogue of actors in the "Dramatic and Musical Review" of 2 October 1847, with qualifying adjectives he is called "Meek Meadows." He was secretary to the Covent Garden Theatrical Fund, and contributed some recollections and other articles to the press. A portrait of him as Raubvogel in "Returned Killed" is in the Mathews collection in the Garrick Club.
