= Joseph Knight (critic) =

English dramatic critic and theatre historian

(John) Joseph Knight (1829–1907) was an English dramatic critic and theatre historian.

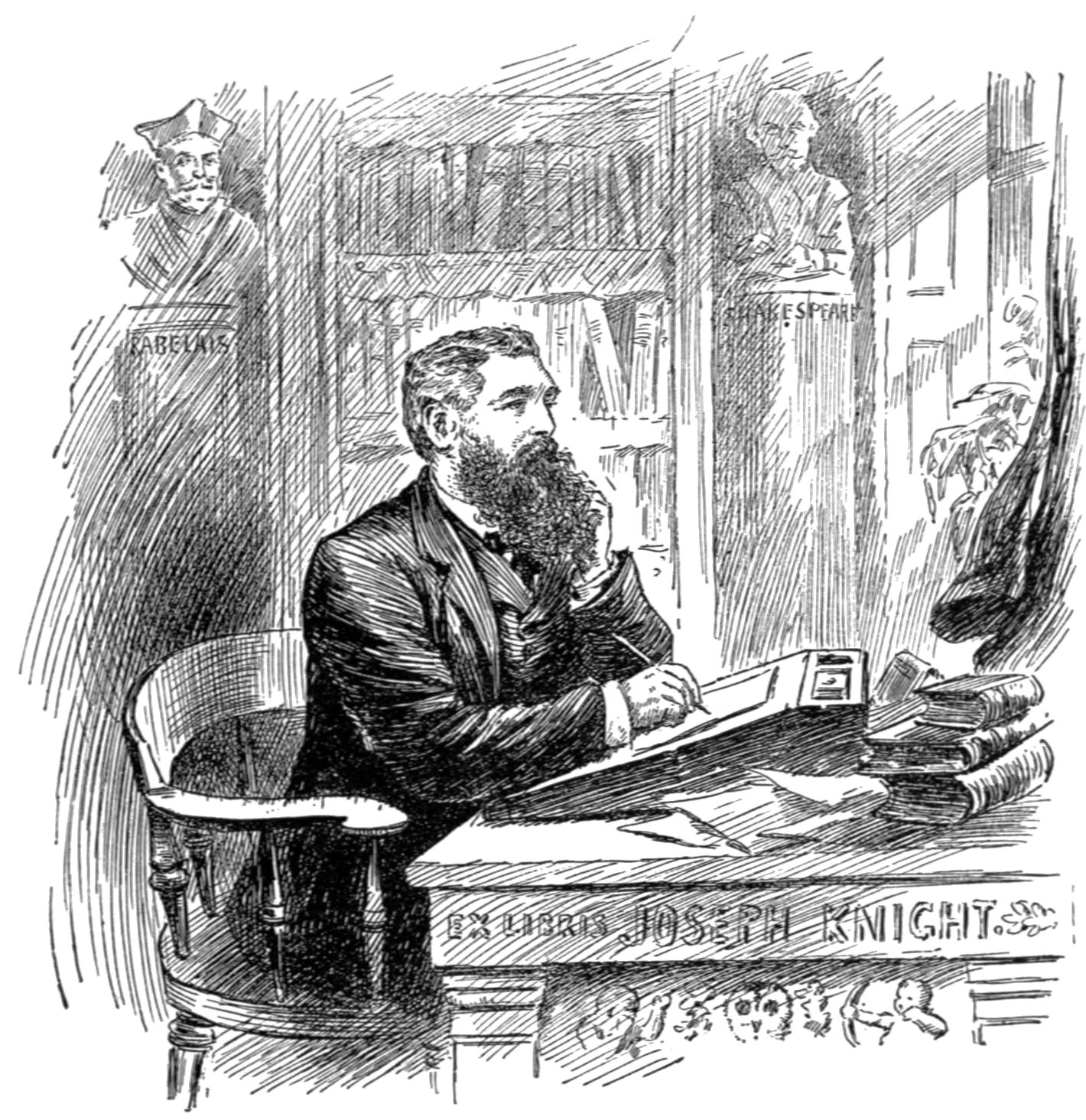
Joseph Knight, from a book plate

== Life ==
Born at Leeds on 24 May 1829, he was elder son of Joseph Knight, a cloth merchant from Carlisle, and Marianne, daughter of Joseph Wheelwright. He was educated at Bramham College near Tadcaster.

Joining his father in business at age 19, Knight began collecting books. With Alfred Austin, his junior by six years, he helped to found a Mechanics' Institute at Leeds, at which he lectured on literary subjects. On 7 April 1854 he lectured on The Fairies of English Poetry to the Leeds Philosophical and Literary Society. At Leeds, too, he made the acquaintance of William Edward Forster, who stayed at Knight's house while he was parliamentary candidate for the constituency in 1859. Knight seconded Forster's nomination.

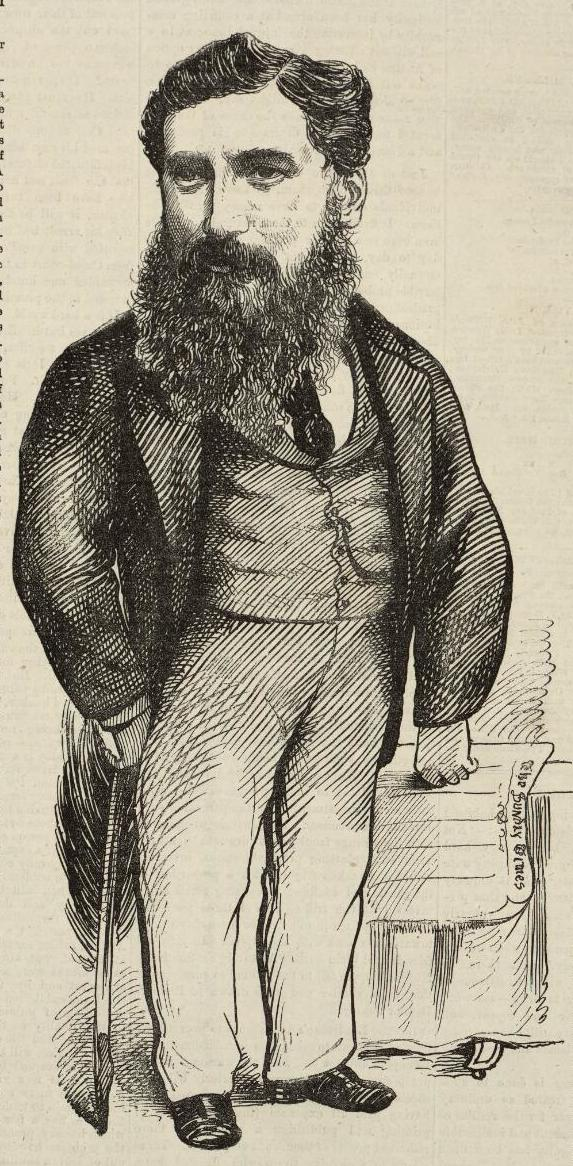
1876 caricature of Joseph Knight

In 1860 Knight moved to London as a journalist. He found early employment as dramatic critic for the Literary Gazette, through a chance meeting with the editor John Morley. He then concentrated on writing about the contemporary stage. In 1869 he succeeded John Abraham Heraud, as dramatic critic of the Athenæum, and retained the post for the rest of his life.

In 1871, during the siege of Paris, Knight used his influence to secure the invitation to the Comedie Française to act at the Gaiety Theatre in London. He also acted as dramatic critic for the Sunday Times, The Globe, and for the Daily Graphic from 1894 to 1906.

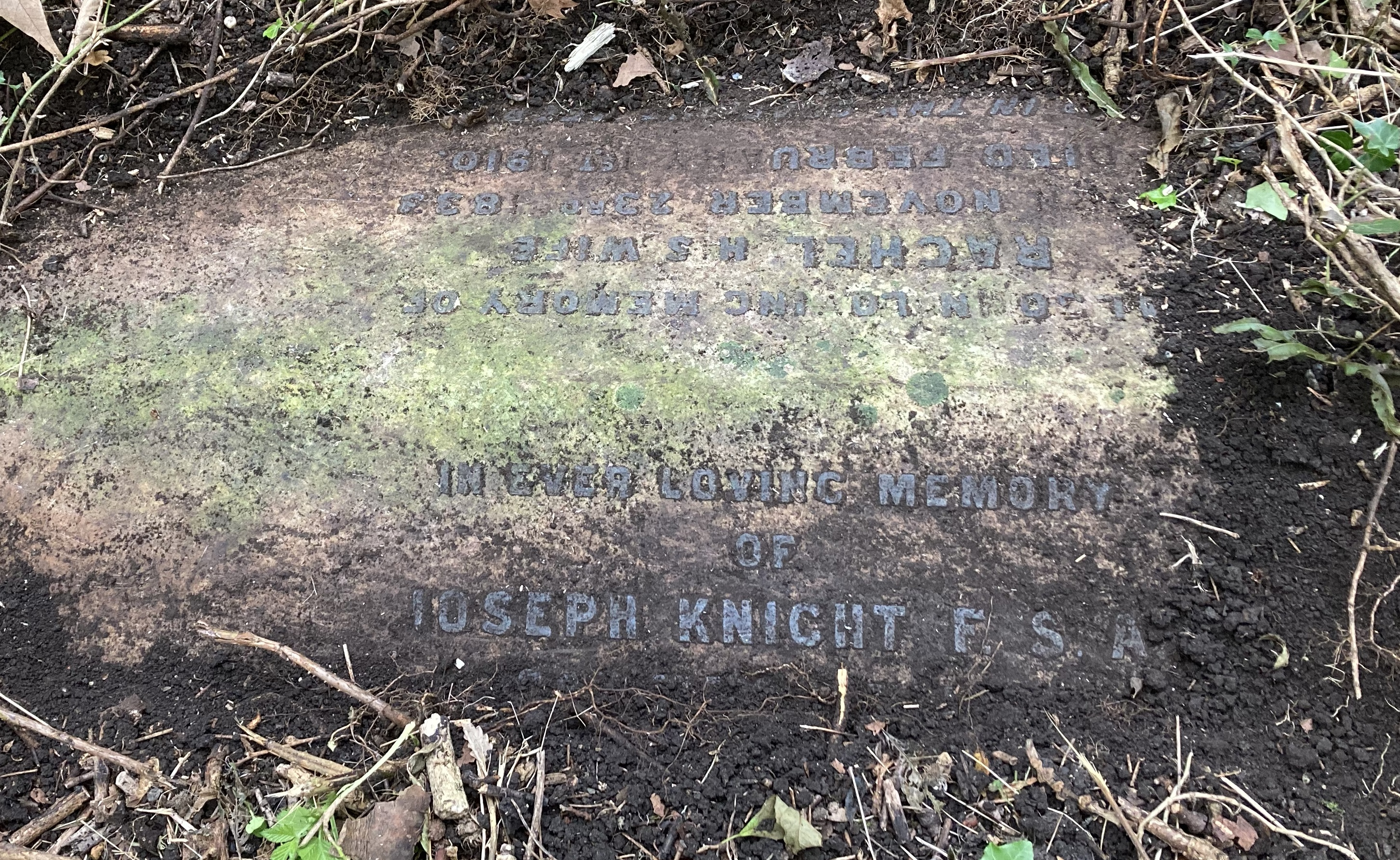
Grave of Joseph Knight in Highgate Cemetery

In London Knight moved in literary and dramatic circles. Early associates included John Westland Marston and Sebastian Evans. At Marston's house he met authors and playwrights; Thomas Purnell introduced him to Swinburne, to whom and Dante Gabriel Rossetti he became close.

Knight contributed the causerie signed "Sylvanus Urban" to the Gentleman's Magazine from 1887 till near his death, and he was a reviewer of general literature for the Athenæum. In July 1883, on the death of Henry Frederic Turle, he became editor of Notes and Queries, and retained the position for life. A bohemian and clubman, he was a leading member of the Arundel Club; after 1883, when he was elected to the Garrick Club (3 March), he was mainly found there. On 4 July 1905 the dramatic profession entertained him, as the oldest living dramatic critic, to dinner at the Savoy Hotel. Sir Henry Irving took the chair, and Benoît-Constant Coquelin and Gabrielle Réjane were among the guests.

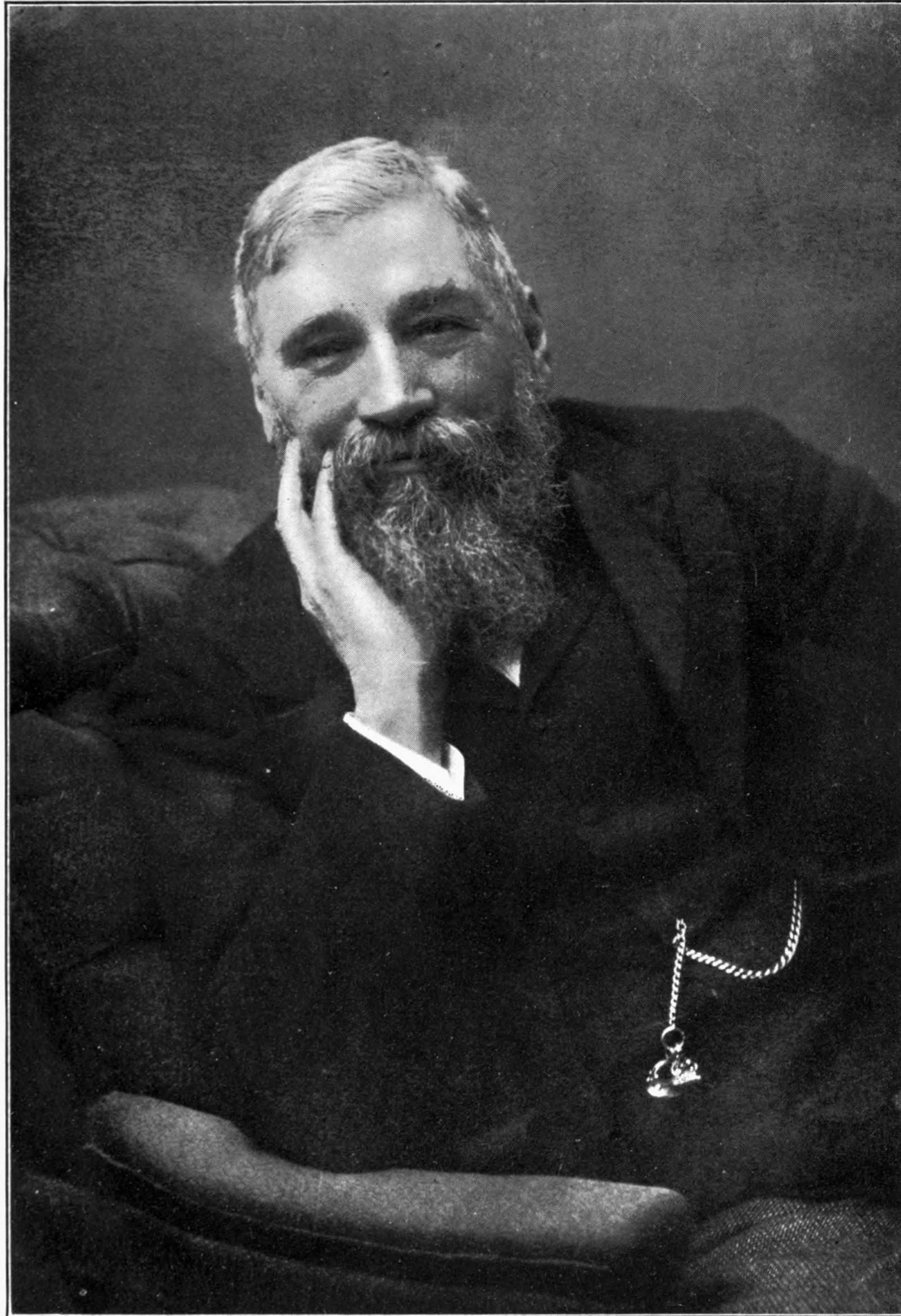
Joseph Knight, age 67

On 4 May 1893 Knight was elected Fellow of the Society of Antiquaries of London. A book collector through life, he twice had to sell up, on the second occasion in 1905.

He died at his house, 27 Camden Square, on 23 June 1907, and was buried on the eastern side of Highgate cemetery. A posthumous portrait in oils by Margaret Grose was presented to the Garrick Club in 1912 by Knight's friend Henry Benjamin Wheatley.

== Works ==
Knight wrote on theatre history, and was the main contributor of the lives of actors to the Dictionary of National Biography, first edition and first supplement. His articles numbered over 500. The biography of David Garrick was the basis of a separate memoir (1894). He published in 1893 Theatrical Notes 1874-1879 (1893), a collection of articles on the drama from the Athenæum, and he edited in 1886 the Roscius Anglicanus of John Downes. In 1887 Knight published the Life of Rossetti in the "Great Writers series".

== Family ==
Knight married at the parish church, Leeds, on 3 June 1856, Rachel (d. 1 February 1910), youngest daughter of John Wilkinson of Gledhall Mount near Leeds. He had issue a son Philip Sidney, b. 2 Feb. 1857, who emigrated to Australia; and two daughters, Gertrude who married Ian Forbes Robertson, parents of Beatrice Forbes-Robertson Hale; and Florence Mabel, who married Edward Mansel Sympson, of Lincoln, on 3 October 1888.

== Notes ==
Attribution

This article incorporates text from a publication now in the public domain: Lee, Sidney, ed. (1912). "Knight, Joseph (1829-1907)". Dictionary of National Biography (2nd supplement). Vol. 2. London: Smith, Elder & Co.
