= Toga play =

Antiquity-themed theatrical genre

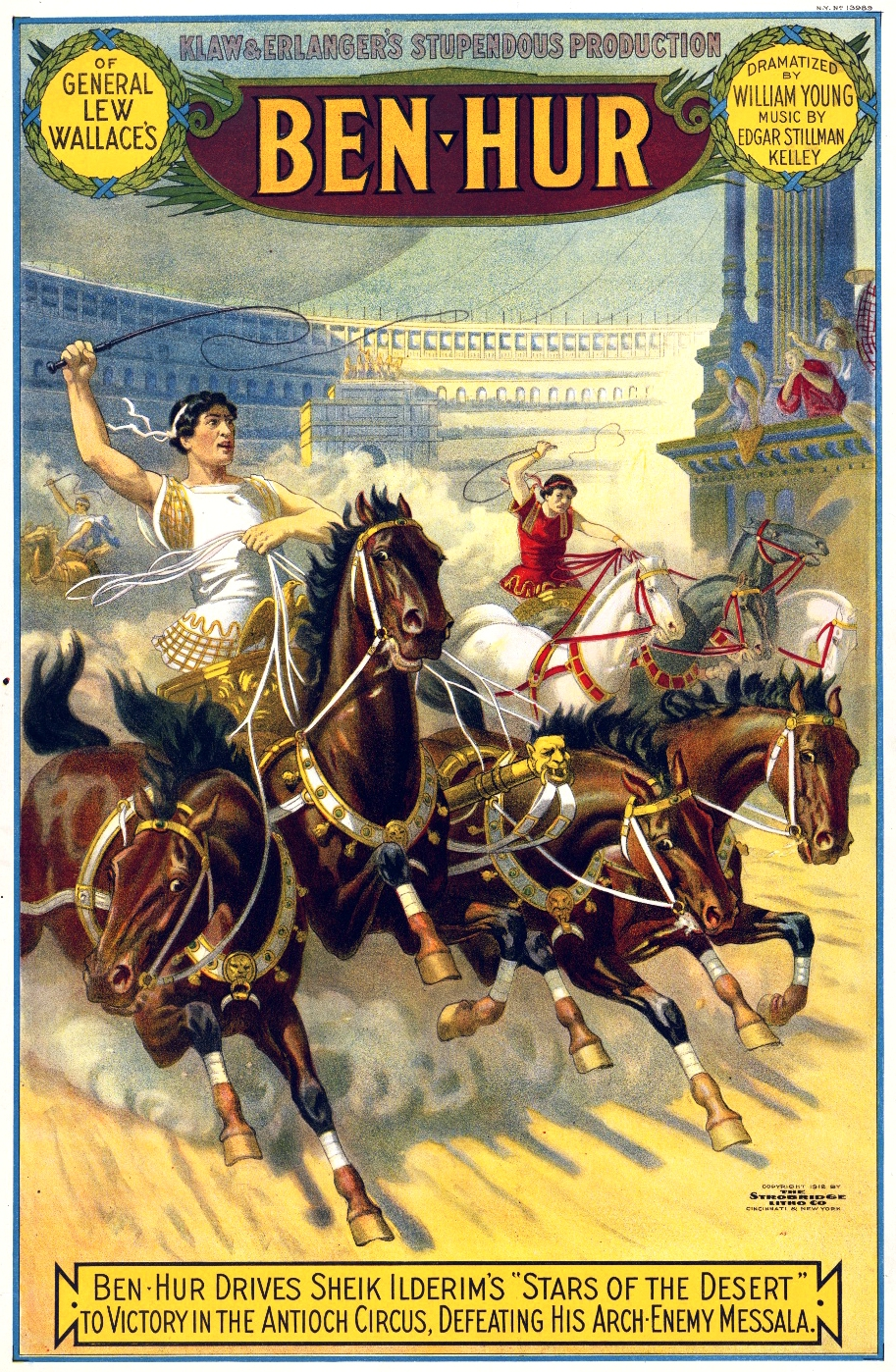
1899 poster from the Broadway premiere of Ben-Hur.

The toga play was a theatrical genre popular at the end of the nineteenth century and the start of the twentieth century. It combined plots from popular novels with inspiration from Victorian painters and composers, all set against a classically themed background.

== Content ==
The toga play combined plots from popular novels with visual inspiration from contemporary Victorian painters such as Lawrence Alma-Tadema and Frederick Lord Leighton, and music from composers such as Charles Gounod, Giacomo Meyerbeer and Alexandre Luigini, all set against a classically themed background.

The plays have been described by David Mayer as reflecting the cultural and social anxieties of their age, such as the rise of feminism, fears about mass migration, class conflict, and the future of the British Empire.

== Notable examples ==
Toga plays appeared both in mainstream theatre and in music hall entertainments from around the 1880s and were popular in Great Britain and the United States until the start of the twentieth century. Among the notable examples were Claudian (1883), The Sign of the Cross (1895), and Ben-Hur (1899). They crossed over into silent film, for example, in Ben-Hur (1907) and The Barbarian Ingomar (1908).

== See also ==
- Tableau vivant
