= The Provost of Bruges =

1836 play

- Original language: English
- Written by: George William Lovell
- Genre: Tragedy
- Setting: Bruges, 1127

Premiere
- Date: 10 February 1836
- Place: Theatre Royal, Covent Garden, London

The Provost of Bruges is a historical tragedy by the British writer George William Lovell. It premiered at the Theatre Royal, Covent Garden in London on 10 February 1836. The original cast featured William Macready as Bertulphe, Provost of Bruges, James Prescott Warde as Tancmar, Charles James Mathews as Gautier, Drinkwater Meadows as Phillipe, William Payne as Denis, Robert William Honner as Page, Ellen Kean as Constance and Mary Gossop Vining as Ursula.

== Bibliography ==
- Nicoll, Allardyce. A History of Early Nineteenth Century Drama 1800-1850. Cambridge University Press, 1930.
- Taylor, George. Players and Performances in the Victorian Theatre. Manchester University Press, 1993.
