= Ingomar the Barbarian (play) =

1851 play

- Original language: English
- Written by: Maria Ann Lovell
- Genre: Historical
- Setting: Massilia, Antiquity

Premiere
- Date: 9 June 1851
- Place: Theatre Royal, Drury Lane, London

Ingomar the Barbarian is an 1851 historical play by the British writer and former actress Maria Ann Lovell. It was based on the German play Der Sohn der Wildnis by Friedrich Halm. It premiered at the Theatre Royal, Drury Lane on 9 June 1851. The original cast included John Garside Neville as the Timarch of Masillia, James Robertson Anderson as Ingomar and Charlotte Vandenhoff as Parthenia. It appeared frequently on the American stage for the remainder of the nineteenth century.

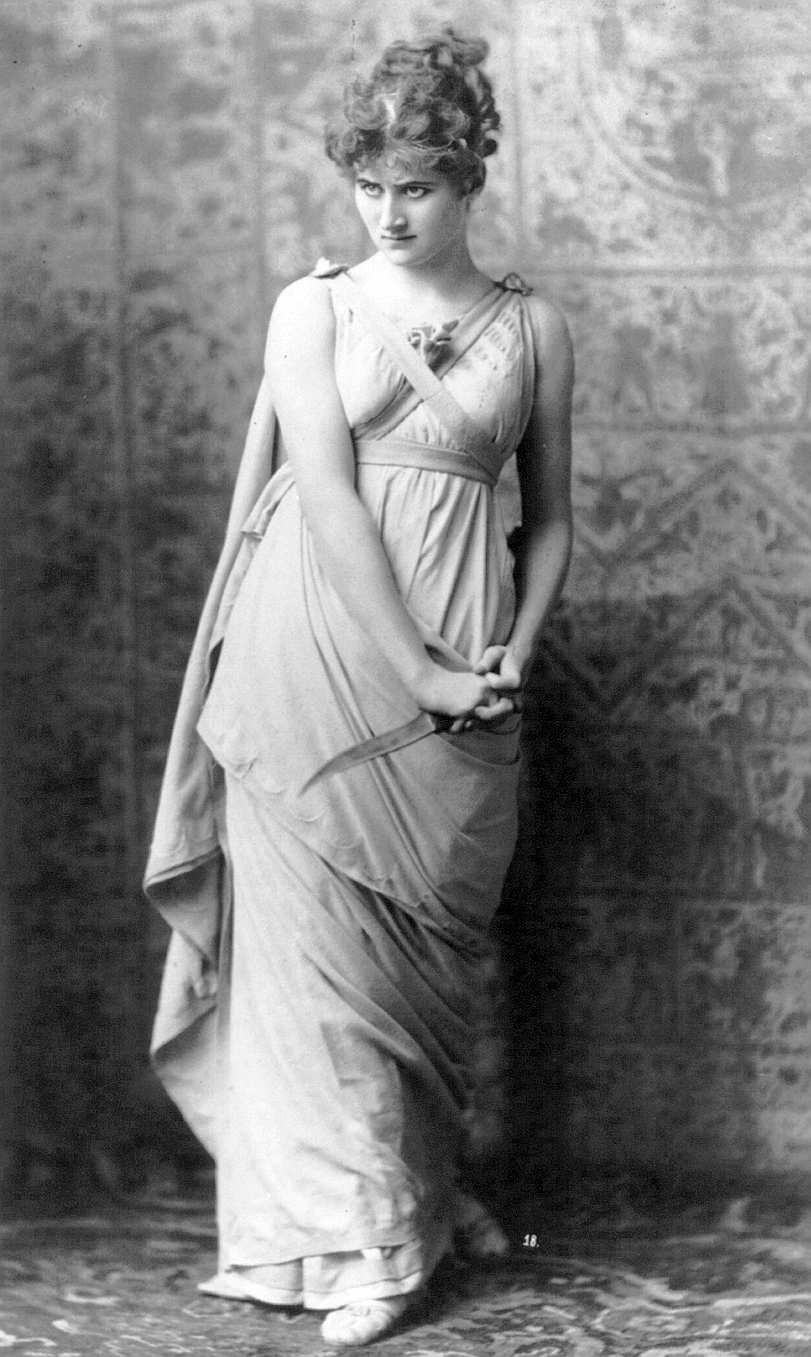
Mary Anderson as Parthenia in 1883.

== Adaptation ==
In 1908 it provided the basis for the American short silent film Ingomar, the Barbarian directed by D. W. Griffith.

== Bibliography ==
- Jackson, Allan Stuart. The Standard Theatre of Victorian England. Fairleigh Dickinson Univ Press, 1993.
- Mayer, David. Stagestruck Filmmaker: D. W. Griffith and the American Theatre. University of Iowa Press, 2009.
