= Henry Howe (actor) =

English actor

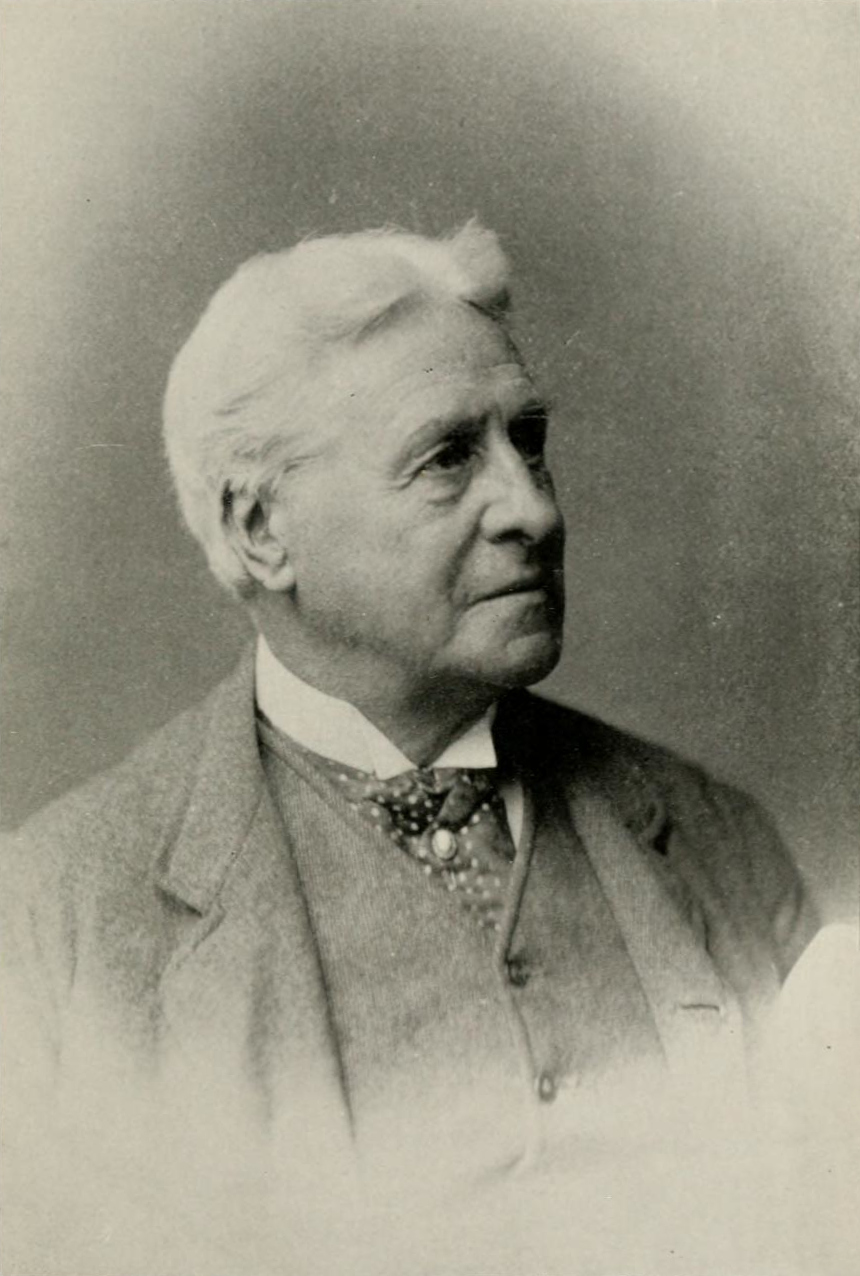
Henry Howe

Henry Howe (born Henry Howe Hutchinson; 31 March 1812 – 9 March 1896) was an English actor, appearing in prominent roles at London theatres. He was a member of the company at the Haymarket Theatre for forty years.

== Life ==
Howe was born of Quaker parents in Norwich on 31 March 1812. After some experiments as an amateur under the name Halsingham, he made his debut at the Royal Victoria Theatre in London in October 1834, as Rashleigh Osbaldistone in a dramatization of Rob Roy. At East End and suburban theatres he played Antonio in The Merchant of Venice, and Tressel in Richard III; and at the Strand, under William John Hammond in 1837, was Winkle in Samuel Weller, or, The Pickwickians by William Thomas Moncrieff. In the same year he acted with William Macready at Covent Garden, and in February 1838 he took part there in the original performance of The Lady of Lyons by Edward Bulwer-Lytton. For Macready's farewell appearance in 1839, in the title role in Julius Caesar, Howe was Mark Antony.

=== Haymarket Theatre ===
Joining the Haymarket Theatre under Benjamin Webster, he remained there without a break in his engagement for the almost unprecedented term of forty years. Among innumerable original parts were: Brandon in George William Lovell's Look Before You Leap in October 1846, Ernest de Fonblanche in The Roused Lion in November 1847, and Lord Arden in Lovell's The Wife's Secret in January 1848.

His characters included the title role in Fazio by Henry Hart Milman, Sir George Airy in The Busie Body, Archer in The Beaux' Stratagem, Benedick in Much Ado About Nothing, Joseph Surface in The School for Scandal, Sir Anthony Absolute in The Rivals, Sir Peter Teazle in The School for Scandal, Malvolio in Twelfth Night, Jaques in As You Like It, Macduff in Macbeth and Harry Dornton in The Road to Ruin. His performance in The Provoked Husband by John Vanbrugh was reviewed in The Athenaeum (24 November 1855): "Miss Cushman was carefully supported by Mr Howe, who, in the part of Lord Townly, rose to a degree of excellence that will serve to confirm the steady progress which he has lately been making in the good opinion of the public. In the pathos of the concluding scene he showed a power of producing a state of feeling in the house not always possessed by actors of greater name."

He used to state that there were pieces (such as The Lady of Lyons) in which, during his gradual rise, he had played every male part from the lowest to the highest.

=== Vaudeville Theatre and Lyceum Theatre ===
In August 1879, at the Vaudeville Theatre, Howe was the first Rev. Otho Doxey in Richard Lee's Home for Home, and he played William Farren Jr.'s part of Clench in Our Girls by Henry James Byron. Soon afterwards he took Henry Irving's role of Digby Grant in a revival of James Albery's Two Roses. In December 1881, as Mr Furnival in the same piece, he appeared at the Lyceum, with which his closing years were connected. Here he played characters such as Old Capulet in Romeo and Juliet, Antonio in Much Ado about Nothing and Twelfth Night, Germeuil in Robert Macaire by Benjamin Antier, Farmer Flamborough in Olivia by W. G. Wills, Burgomaster in Faust, and very many others.

Howe accompanied Henry Irving to America, and he died in Cincinnati, Ohio on 9 March 1896.

His son, Henry A. Hutchinson Howe, music and theatre critic on the Morning Advertiser, predeceased him, dying on 1 June 1894, aged sixty-one.

John Joseph Knight wrote: "He was a thoroughly conscientious actor, and an exceptionally worthy and amiable man, whose one delight was to cultivate his garden at Isleworth."
