= Friedrich Halm =

Austrian dramatist, poet and novella writer

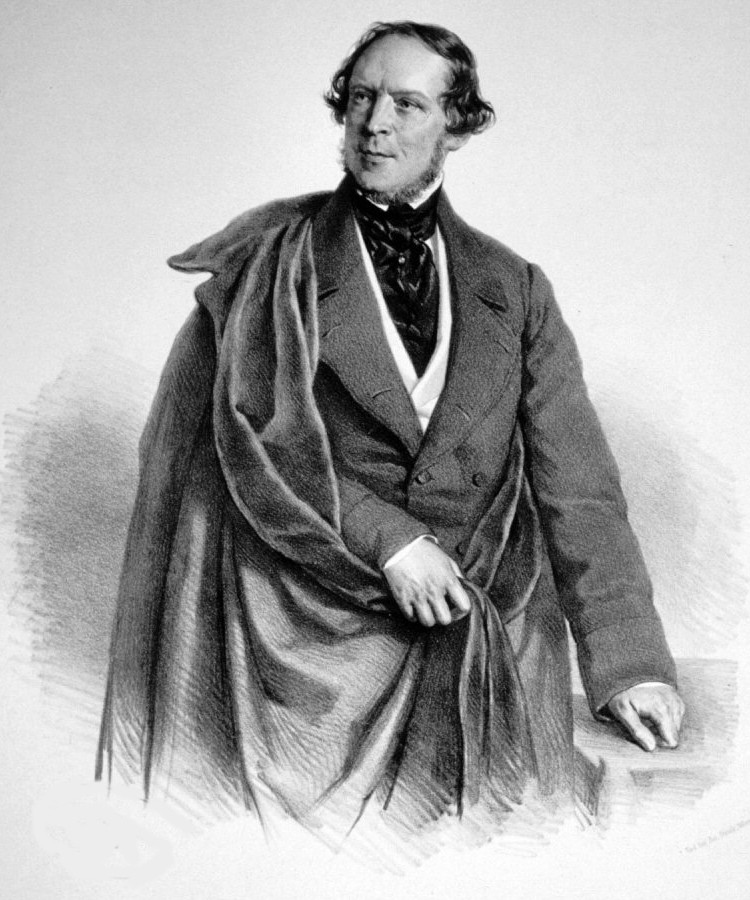
Eligius Franz Joseph von Münch-Bellinghausen (Friedrich Halm); lithograph by Joseph Kriehuber

Baron Eligius Franz Joseph von Münch-Bellinghausen (German: Eligius Franz Joseph Freiherr von Münch-Bellinghausen) (2 April 1806 – 22 May 1871) was an Austrian dramatist, poet and novella writer of the Austrian Biedermeier period and beyond, and is more generally known under his pseudonym Friedrich Halm.

== Life and career ==
He was the son of a district judge at Kraków in Poland, at this time part of the Austrian Empire. Early in his literary career he adopted the nom de plume of Friedrich Halm ("Halm" means a blade of grass or a blade of straw), and became one of the most popular dramatists in Vienna around the middle of the 19th century. His novellas are now regarded as more significant from a literary point of view than his dramatic writings.

Münch-Bellinghausen was educated at the seminary of Melk Abbey and later at Vienna, where he studied philosophy and jurisprudence, and where he began his career in 1826.

As a boy he took a keen interest in the theater, and from 1833 enjoyed the friendship of his former teacher, the Benedictine Michael Leopold Enk von der Burg, who encouraged the poet to offer his drama Griseldis to the Hofburg theatre. Its successful production in 1835 established Halm's reputation as a playwright and henceforth he continued to write for the stage with varying success.

Münch-Bellinghausen became Regierungsrat (government councillor) in 1840 and Kustos (chief keeper) of the Court Library in 1844, a position that Franz Grillparzer had sought in vain. He was elected member of the Austrian Academy of Sciences in 1852, and life member of the Austrian Herrenhaus in 1861. In 1867, he was appointed superintendent of the two court-theatres (the Burgtheater and the Court Opera, the current Vienna State Opera), but three years later resigned this position which disputes had made distasteful to him. His health also had been failing.

== Literary work ==
Friedrich Halm's earliest full-length drama, Schwert, Hammer, Buch, completed in 1833 but not published until 2022, explores three various routes in quest of happiness: that of the warrior, that of the artisan, and that of the artist (cf. scholarly research article on Schwert, Hammer, Buch, by Dr. Tony Page entitled: 'Friedrich Halm's Earliest, Large-Scale Drama, Schwert, Hammer, Buch, An Original Research Article', Blade Publications, Bangkok, 2025). This massive drama of several hundred pages, although an early work, has numerous effective passages, deep philosophical musings, a Christian/Buddhist mystical dimension, and anticipates the literary talent that was to burst upon the Viennese literary scene just three or four years later with the publication of Halm's tragedy, Griseldis. Of his many dramatic works the best known are, indeed, Griseldis (1837); Der Adept (1836; publ. 1838), Camoens (1838), Der Sohn der Wildnis (1842), and Der Fechter von Ravenna (1857). Griseldis is based on the well-known story of the faithful wife whose loyalty and devotion are put to the severest tests but who triumphs in the end. Der Sohn der Wildnis ("The Son of the Wilderness") is a romantic drama depicting the power of womanly love and virtue over rude barbarian strength. It was presented on the English stage under the title of Ingomar the Barbarian. Der Fechter von Ravenna ("The Gladiator of Ravenna"), regarded as one of Halm's best dramas, is a tragedy having for its hero Thumelicus the son of Arminius, the liberator of Germany from Roman rule. According to the Encyclopædia Britannica Eleventh Edition, "[his plays] are distinguished by elegance of language, melodious versification and clever construction, and were for a time exceedingly popular."

Halm's numerous other dramas include the vivid and powerful Sampiero (1856, depicting the tragic loss of humanity attendant upon political fanaticism); Iphigenie in Delphi (1856); Begum Somru (1863); Wildfeuer (1864); a German version of Shakespeare's Cymbeline that appeared on the stage in 1842, and an extremely effective and humorous comedy entitled Verbot und Befehl ("Prohibition and Decree", 1856).

He is also the author of lyrics, short stories, and of a narrative poem Charfreitag ("Good Friday") (1864). His poems, Gedichte, were published in Stuttgart, 1850 (new ed. Vienna. 1877). His pessimistic weltanschauung seems to have been formed very early on in life and never to have deserted him, as evidenced by early poems such as Eine Makame and later poems, Schwere Jahre. These describe how life is seen as essentially a vale of tears and filled with suffering, and only made bearable by the hope of a blissful and tranquil life of the spirit. These will supervene after physical death.

Halm's high reputation during his lifetime is indicated by the stone bust which was carved of him and which still sits on top of the famous Burgtheater in Vienna, alongside those of Schiller, Goethe, Grillparzer and Shakespeare (amongst others).

From an early age, Halm showed an aptitude for fictional narrative, perhaps first exemplified in Die Abendgenossen, written when Halm was in his early twenties and containing seeming support for close (possibly homo-amorous) male bonding and friendship. Another early novella from this period, Ein Abend zu L, likewise contains insights on sex and homosexuality which anticipate Freudian psycho-analytical notions. Dr. Tony Page writes on this:

"In view of its daring delineations of human sexuality and repressed sexual urges, its potentially progressive view of same-sex love and general exploration of the human psyche in the grip of passion, Ein Abend zu L. constitutes a remarkable early 19th-century literary document, providing pre-echoes of psycho-analytical ideas that would take the Western world by storm less than a century later."

Halm's other short stories and novellas, which tend to focus on spiritual issues and self-destructive monomaniacal characters, are psychologically insightful—especially his earliest major story, Das Auge Gottes ("The Eye of God"), a lengthy novella written in 1826, about the supernatural reverberations of the blasphemous act of the desecration of a holy icon, and his final narrative piece, Das Haus an der Veronabrücke ("The House on Verona Bridge"), centering on the inner collapse of a man given over to a morally repellent but overriding idée fixe (the enforced sexual coupling of his wife with another man). His novella, Die Marzipan-Lise ("Marzipan Lise"), is credited with being one of the first "criminal fiction tales" of German literature and is now available as an audio book on CD. Furthermore, the composer, Brahms, used some of Halm's verses as the basis for a number of his Lieder, as did composer Pauline Volkstein.

Overall it can be said that it is as a short-story or "novella" writer that Halm has secured a place in the history of German/Austrian literature. His novellas mark Halm out as a writer of talent, psychological penetration and substance. His novella, The House at Verona Bridge (Das Haus an der Veronabruecke) alone stands as a milestone in 19th-century Austrian literature for its probing and insightful treatment of an obsessive mentality that inevitably leads its possessor into tragedy and death.

His collected works, Samtliche Werke, were published arranged in chronological order in eight volumes (1856–1864), to which four posthumous volumes were added in 1872. Also published were Ausgewählte Werke, ed. by Anton Schlossar in 4 vols. (1904). Published for the first time in the 21st century (in Amazon Kindle format) by Dr. Tony Page were a collection of poems entitled Unpublished Poems of Friedrich Halm (2011), also for the first time the complete text of Halm's novella, Das Auge Gottes (2011), as well as Halm's novella, Ein Abend zu L. (2012), plus Halm's earliest full-length novella, St. Sylvesterabend (2017), in addition to Halm's essay on literary aesthetics, Sendschreiben an J. C. R. (2012), as well as his massive drama, Schwert, Hammer, Buch (2022) and the earlier melodrama, Die Nacht der Rache (2024), all transcribed, edited and introduced by Dr. Tony Page.

== Works ==
=== Plays ===
- Die Nacht der Rache, written 1826, published 2024
- Schwert, Hammer, Buch, written 1833 but never published until 2022
- Griseldis, 1835
- Der Adept, 1836
- Camoens, 1837
- Imelda Lambertazzi, 1838
- Ein mildes Urteil, 1840
- König und Bauer, 1841
- Der Sohn der Wildnis, 1842
- Sampiero, 1844
- Maria da Molina, 1847
- Verbot und Befehl, 1848
- Der Fechter von Ravenna, 1854
- Eine Königin, 1857
- Iphigenie in Delphi, 1857
- Vor hundert Jahren, 1859
- Begum Somru, 1860
- Wildfeuer, 1864

=== Stories ===
- St. Sylvesterabend, composed 1823, published 2017
- Das Auge Gottes, 1826, first published in full 2011
- Die Abendgenossen, written in 1828, published in 2026
- Ein Abend zu L., written in 1828, published in 2012
- Die Marzipanliese, 1856
- Die Freundinnen, 1860
- Das Haus an der Veronabrücke, 1864

=== Collections ===
- Gedichte, 1850
- Gesammelte Werke, 8 vols., 1856–1864
- Erzählungen

== See also ==
- List of Austrian writers
