= Harriette Deborah Lacy =

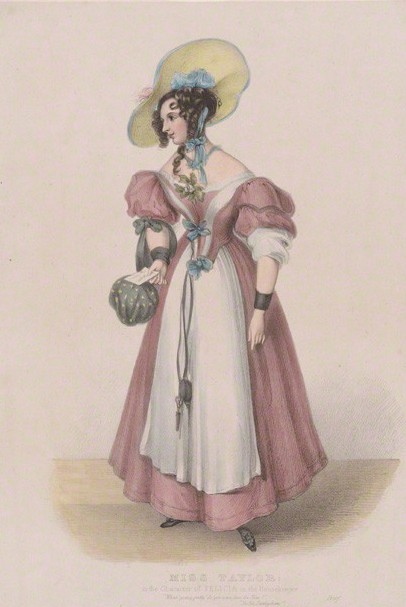
Harriette Deborah Lacy, in character as Felicia in The Housekeeper

Harriette Deborah Lacy (1807–1874) was an English actress.

Born in London, she was the daughter of a tradesman named Taylor. Her first appearance on the stage was at Bath in 1827 as Julia in The Rivals, and she was immediately given leading parts there, in both comedy and tragedy.

Taylor's first London appearance was in 1830 as Nina, in William Dimond's Carnival of Naples. Her Rosalind, Aspatia (to Macready's Melantius) in The Bridal, and Lady Teazle to the Charles Surface of Walter Lacy (whom she was married in 1839) confirmed her position and popularity. She was the original Helen in The Hunchback (1832), and also created Nell Gwynne in Douglas William Jerrold's play of that name, and the heroine in his Housekeeper. She was considered the leading Ophelia of her day. She retired in 1848.
