= John Westland Marston =

English dramatist and critic (1819–1890)

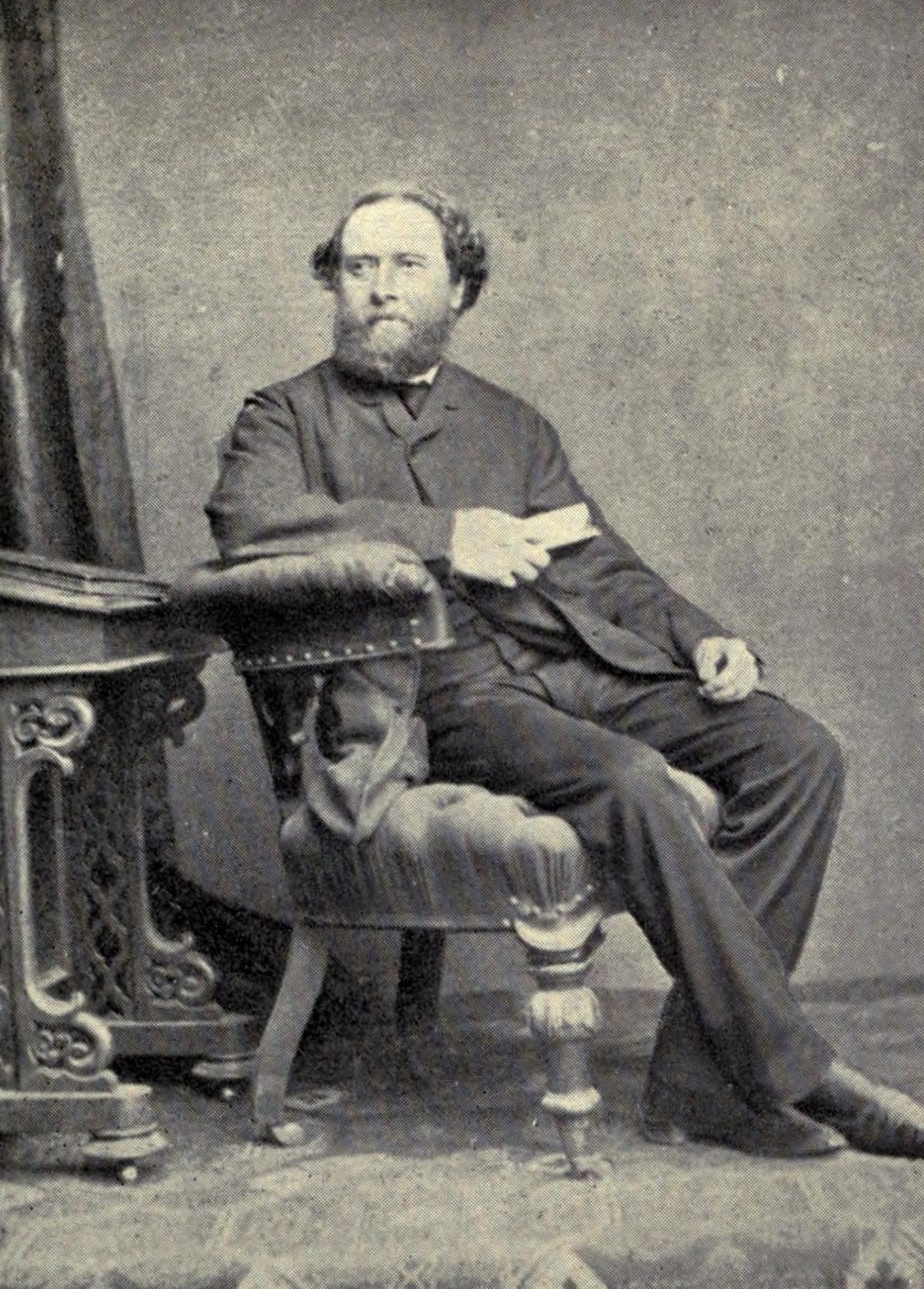
John Westland Marston.

John Marston (30 January 1819 – 5 January 1890) was an English dramatist and critic.

== Early life and career ==
He was born at Boston, Lincolnshire, on 30 January 1819, was son of the Rev. Stephen Marston, minister of a Baptist congregation. In 1834, he was apprenticed to his maternal uncle, a London solicitor; but although he was not inattentive to the duties of the office after obtained a fair knowledge of law, literature and the theatre had much greater attractions for him. His evenings were devoted to the theatre and becoming acquainted with Heraud, Francis Barham, and other members of the group which gathered around James Pierrepont Greaves. In 1847, the author Richard Bedingfield dedicated his domestic verse tragedy, Madeline, to Marston, who was a good friend of his.

He contributed to Heraud's magazine The Sunbeam, and himself became editor of a mystical periodical entitled The Psyche. Among its chief supporters were some wealthy ladies near Cheltenham, Through them he made the acquaintance of Eleanor Jane Potts, eldest daughter of the proprietor of Saunders's News-Letter, who had retired to Cheltenham. She was not, as has been stated, a member of the Earl of Mayo's family. A warm and durable attachment on both sides was the consequence, which resulted in marriage in May 1840, notwithstanding the strongest opposition on the part of the lady's family. Marston idealised and inverted his love story in his first play, The Patrician's Daughter (1841, 8vo), performed in December 1842. Marston had already produced a little volume entitled Gerald, a Dramatic Poem, and other Poems (1842, 12mo), respectable, like everything he wrote.

The Heart and the World (1847) was a failure, but in 1849 Marston, laying his theories aside for a time, appeared with a historical drama, Strathmore, which obtained great success, and which he himself regarded as his best work. It has fine literary qualities, although the author's inability to think himself into the age he exhibits constitutes a grave defect. The same may be said of Philip of France and Marie de Meranie (1850), 'a stirring tragedy, of which the verse has an appropriate martial ring,' and in which Helen Faucit produced a great impression. It is based to some extent on G. P. R. James's novel Philip Augustus.

== Middle Period ==
In the interim (1862) had appeared Anne Blake another domestic drama, clever, but marred by such situations and denouements as only occur on the stage. In A Life's Hansom (1857) the domestic and historical elements are in some measure blended, the action being laid at the revolution of 1688. Such a piece might be easily produced by a man of Mareton's literary ability, but his next tragi-comedy, A Hard Struggle (1858), required genuine feeling in the author and great command over the resources of the stage. Being written in prose, it produces a greater impression of reality than his more ambitious efforts; it drew tears and enthusiastic praise from Charles Dickens, and obtained a greater success than any of his pieces, owing in part to the powerful acting of Dillon.

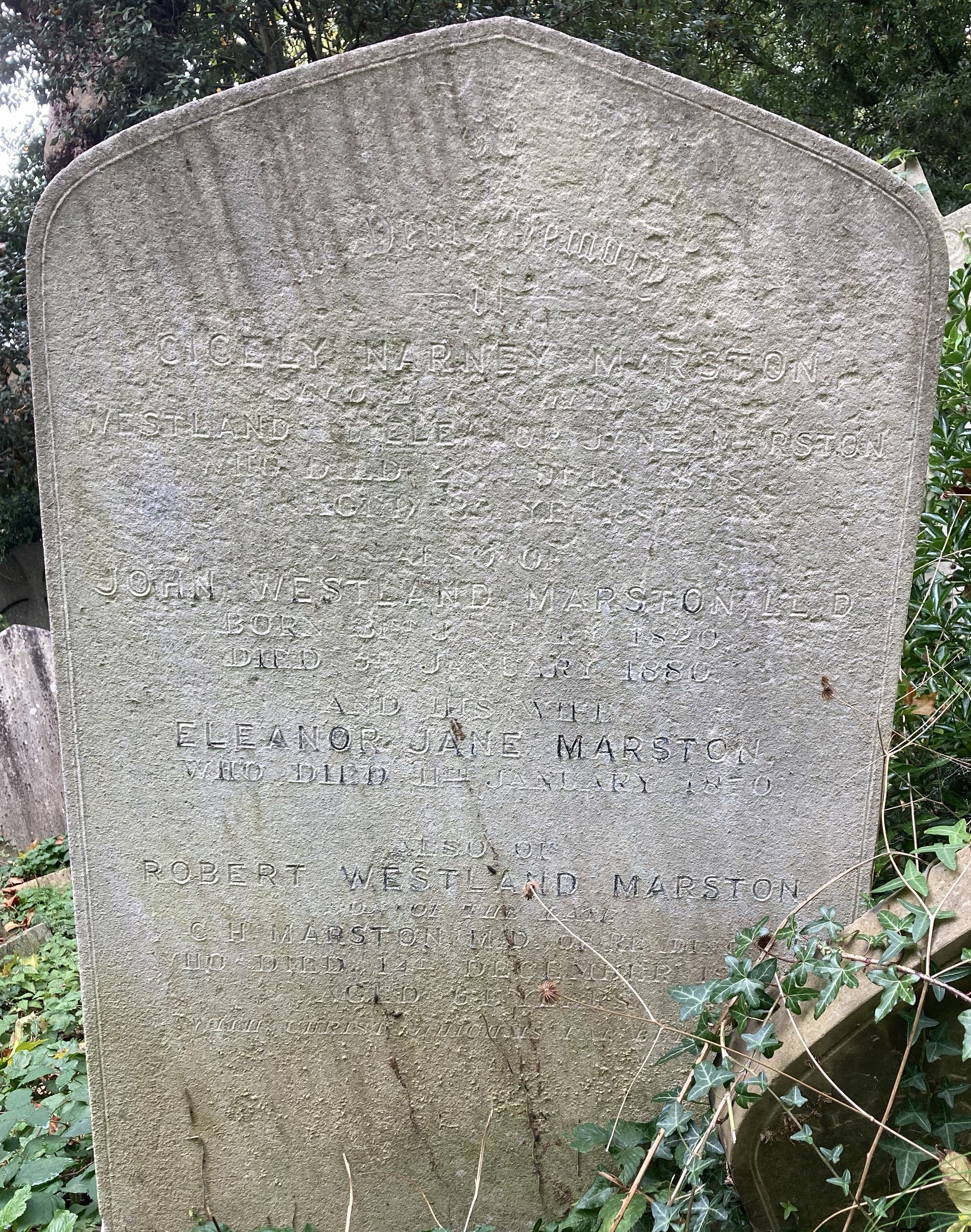
Grave of John Westland Marston in Highgate Cemetery

After his marriage, Marston lived entirely in London, except for occasional visits to France and short lecturing tours in Scotland and Lancashire. He had become well known in London literary society, especially to Dickens and his circle, and had taken a part in Bulwer Lytton's comedy of Not So Bad as We Seem, acted for the benefit of the Guild of Literature and Art. About the same time a tragedy on the history of Montezuma, which would have afforded ample scope for scenic display, was written for and purchased by Charles Kean, but never produced.

In 1857, Marston undertook the editorship of the National Magazine in conjunction with John Saunders. The early numbers had excellent contributions from Sydney Dobell, Mrs. Crowe, and other writers of mark, and illustrations after young artists of genius like Arthur Hughes and W. L. Windus, and with adequate capital the enterprise would probably have succeeded. Relinquishing it, and also renouncing vain attempts in fiction, for which, strangely enough, he did not appear to possess the slightest qualification, Marston returned to the theatre, and produced successively The Wife's Portrait (1862) and Pure Gold (1863), prose dramas of little account; Donna Diana (1863), the best of all his plays, but mainly taken from Moreto's masterpiece, El Desden con el Desden; and The Favourite of Fortune (1866). It achieved a conspicuous success upon its production.

The same remark applies to A Hero of Romance, adapted from Octave Feuillet in 1867, and Life for Life (1869), written for Miss Neilson. Broken Spells followed in 1873, but with his last play, Under Fire (1885), he experienced a mortifying failure. The piece was the weakest he ever wrote, and he had entirely lost touch with the time.

From about 1863, Marston contributed much poetical criticism to the Athenæum. The celebrated review of Atalanta in Calydon was written by him. Criticism, indeed, seemed rather his forte than original composition. His theoretical knowledge of the histrionic art was also profound; but though he showed little disposition to cultivate it practically, he was an excellent mimic, and Miss Neilson, like many other actors and actresses, owed much to his tuition. No one judged an actor more accurately, and the admonitions of few were more valuable. He proved his power as a critic of acting in his Our Recent Actors: Recollect ions of late distinguished Performers of both Sexes, 1888.

From 1860 to about 1874, Marston's circumstances were prosperous, and his house near the Regent's Park was a favourite meeting-place for poets, actors, and literary men. The latter years of his life were clouded by calamity, especially the successive deaths of his wife in 1870, of his two daughters, Eleanor, wife of Arthur O'Shaughnessy, in February 1879, and Cicely in July 1878, and of his gifted and only son, Philip Bourke Marston. His circumstances also became much impaired; but his friend Mr. Henry Irving generously organised (1 June 1887) a special performance of Werner for his benefit at the Lyceum Theatre.

The full receipts, amounting to £928 16s., were paid to Marston; all the expenses being borne by Mr. Irving.

Marston died at his lodgings in the Euston Road, 5 January 1890, after a long illness, and was interred with his wife and children on the eastern side of Highgate Cemetery (plot no.28199).
