= Princess's Theatre, London =

Coordinates: 51°30′57″N 0°8′16″W

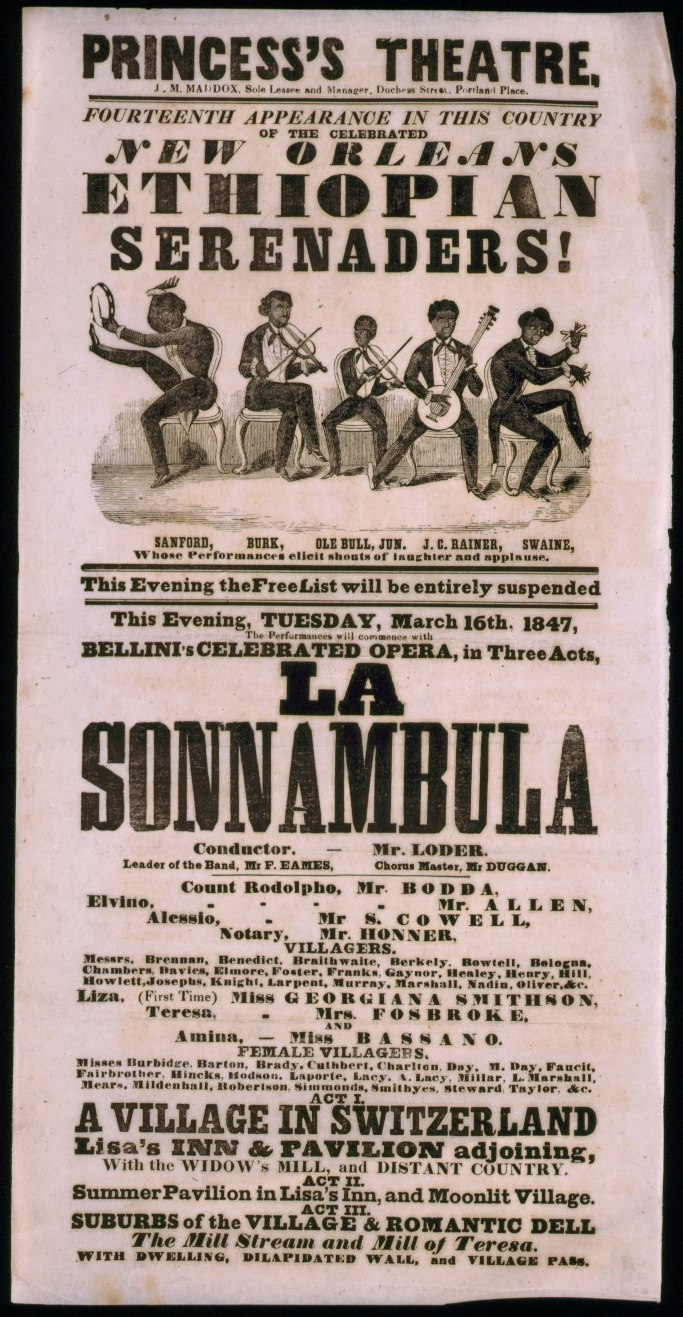
1847 poster for the Princess's Theatre

The Princess's Theatre or Princess Theatre was a theatre in Oxford Street, London. The building opened in 1828 as the "Queen's Bazaar" and housed a diorama by Clarkson Stanfield and David Roberts. It was converted into a theatre and opened in 1836 as the Princess's Theatre, named for then Princess Victoria before her accession as queen. After an unsuccessful series of promenade concerts, alterations were made on the interior, and the theatre was reopened on 26 December 1842 with Vincenzo Bellini's opera La sonnambula. The theatre, by now under the management of John Medex Maddox, presented operas and other entertainments, such as General Tom Thumb.

The theatre is best remembered for Charles Kean's Shakespeare revivals, beginning in 1849 and continuing for ten years. Kean presented these in lavish and well-researched "authentic" productions and also presented French drama. Dion Boucicault became the theatre's leading actor, and Ellen Terry and Henry Irving got their starts at the theatre. Thereafter, the theatre presented mainly melodrama. H. J. Byron wrote a series of Christmas pantomimes for the theatre, beginning in 1859 with Jack the Giant Killer, or, Harlequin, King Arthur, and ye Knights of ye Round Table and followed the next year by Robinson Crusoe, or Harlequin Friday and the King of the Caribee Islands! In 1863, Sefton Parry, recently returned from Cape Town, appeared as Cousin Joe in the farce The Rough Diamond. In 1864, a particularly popular drama was presented at the theatre called The Streets of London. The theatre was demolished and rebuilt in 1879–80. After this, the theatre continued to present melodramas, including The Lights o' London (1881) and The Silver King (1882).

In 1887, the theatre hosted the farcical comedy Romany Rye written by George Robert Sims, performed by the company of Gilbert Elliott, and the show toured from there to the Theatre Royal, Exeter, where the opening night resulted in the Exeter Theatre Royal fire, which was the deadliest theatre disaster in UK history, killed 186 people.

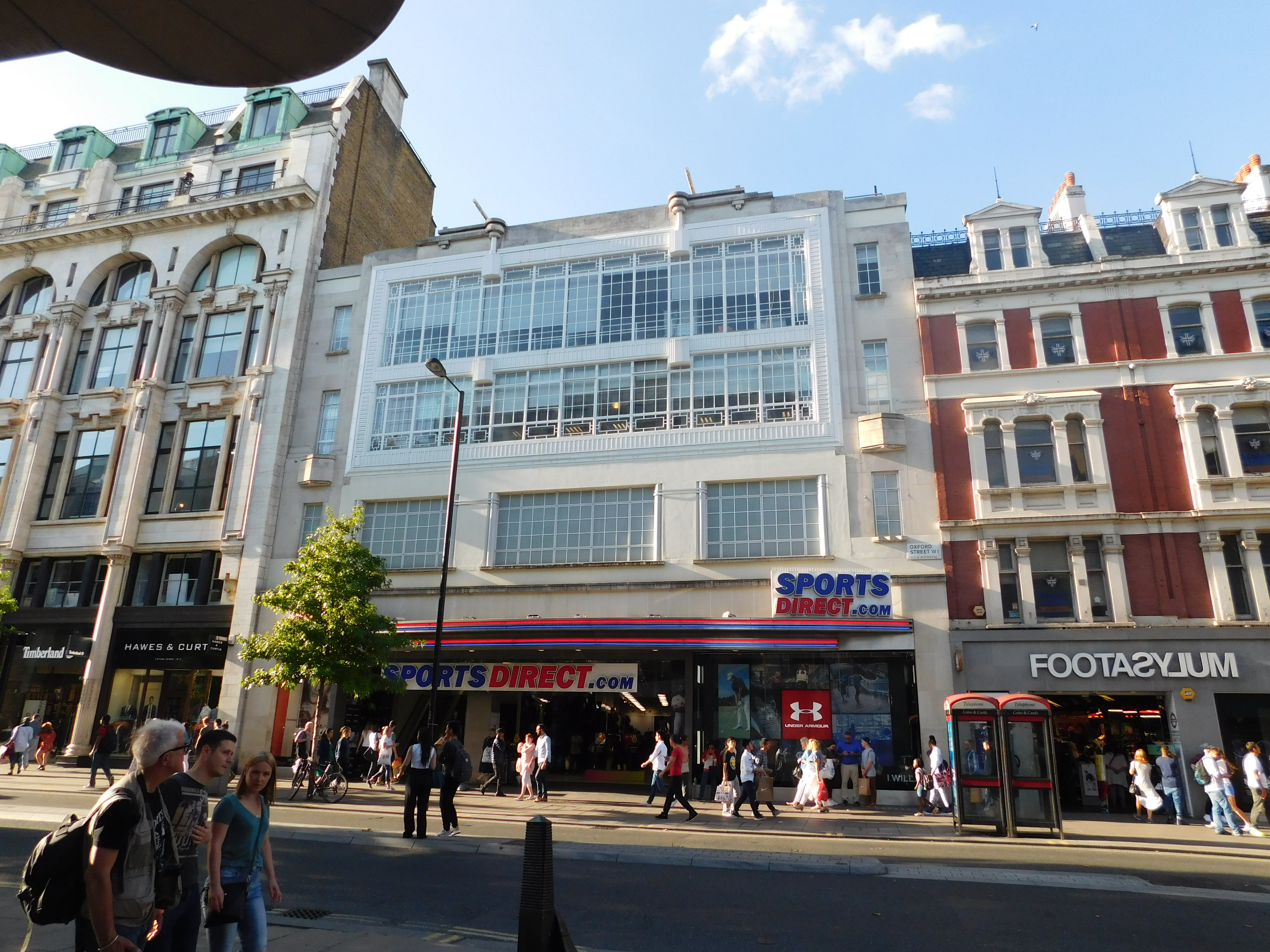
Princess House has stood on the site of the theatre since 1931.

The theatre closed permanently in 1902 after its last success, The Fatal Wedding by Theodore Kremer, and the building became a warehouse. It was demolished in 1931 and replaced by the art deco Princess House (at 150 Oxford Street). This initially housed a Woolworths store, then subsequently (in 1986) the flagship HMV store, which closed in 2014 and was replaced by a Sports Direct store.
