= Charles Kean =

19th-century English actor

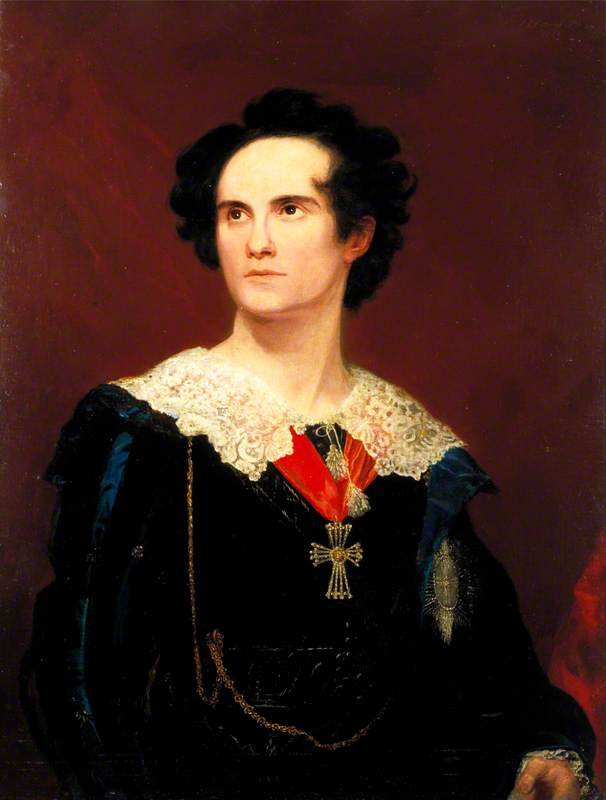
Charles Kean (1811–1868), as Hamlet in "Hamlet" by William Shakespeare, Samuel John Stump (1838)

Charles John Kean (18 January 1811 – 22 January 1868) was an Irish-born English actor and theatre manager, best known for his revivals of Shakespearean plays.

== Life ==
Kean was born in Waterford, Ireland, a son of actor Edmund Kean and actress Mary Kean (nee Chambers). After preparatory education at Worplesdon and at Greenford, near Harrow, he was sent to Eton College, where he remained three years. In 1827, he was offered a cadetship in the East India Company's service, which he was prepared to accept if his father would settle an income of £400 on his mother. The elder Kean refused to do this, and his son determined to become an actor. He made his first appearance at Drury Lane on 1 October 1827 as Norval in Home's Douglas, but his continued failure to achieve popularity led him to leave London in the spring of 1828 for the provinces. In Glasgow, on 1 October in that year, father and son acted together in Arnold Payne's Brutus, the elder Kean in the title-part and his son as Titus.

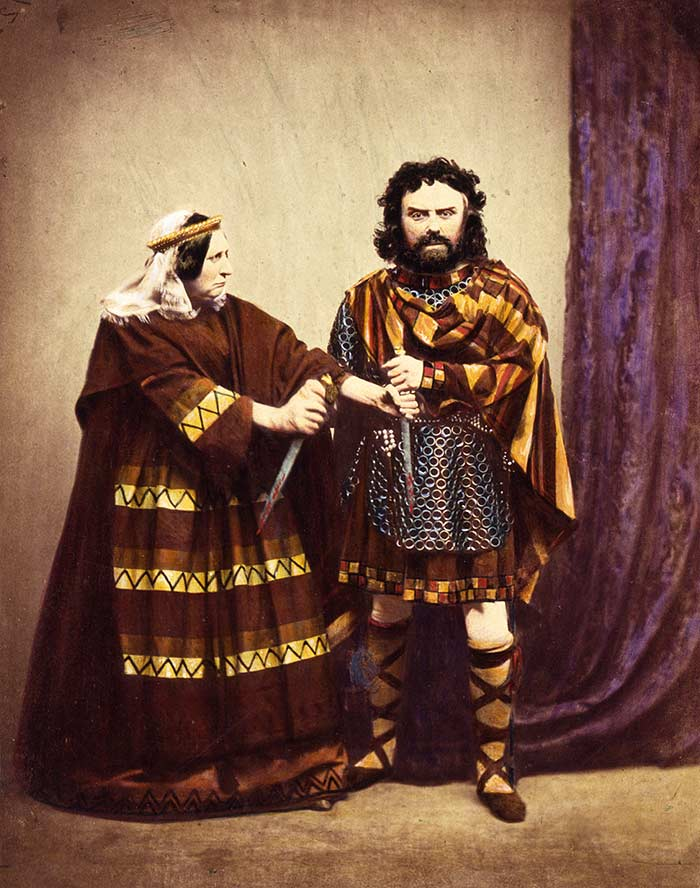
Kean and his wife as Macbeth and Lady Macbeth, in costumes that aimed to be historically accurate (1858).

After a visit to the United States in 1830, where he was received with much favour, he appeared in 1833 at Covent Garden as "Sir Edmund Mortimer" in Colman's The Iron Chest, but his success was not pronounced enough to encourage him to remain in London, especially as he had already won a high position in the provinces. In January 1838, however, he returned to Drury Lane, and played Hamlet with a success which gave him a place among the principal tragedians of his time. He married the actress Ellen Tree (1805–1880) on 25 January 1842, they performed on the Lincoln Circuit in April and May 1845 appearing at Stamford, Peterborough, Boston, Lincoln (where the theatre was uncommonly well attended) and the Georgian Angles Theatre, Wisbech before making a second visit to America with her from 1845 to 1847.

Returning to England, he entered on a successful engagement at the Haymarket Theatre, and in 1850, with Robert Keeley, became lessee of the Princess's Theatre, London. The most noteworthy feature of his management was a series of gorgeous Shakespearean revivals that aimed for "authenticity". Kean also mentored the young Ellen Terry in juvenile roles. In melodramatic parts such as the king in Dion Boucicault's adaptation of Casimir Delavigne's Louis XI, and Louis and Fabian dei Franchi in Boucicault's adaptation of Dumas's The Corsican Brothers, his success was complete. In 1854 the writer Charles Reade created a play The Courier of Lyons for Kean to appear in, which became one of the most popular plays of the Victorian era.

From his "tour round the world" Kean returned in 1866 in broken health, and died in London on 22 January 1868 at the age of 57. He is buried at Horndean, Hampshire.

== Family ==
His daughter Mary Maria Kean, married the eminent military surgeon, Surgeon general Cosmo Gordon Logie.
