= 1847 in literature =

This article contains information about the literary events and publications of 1847.

== Events ==
- January – The novel Vanity Fair: Pen and Pencil Sketches of English Society begins serial publication in Punch magazine (London) in yellow covers, with illustrations by the author, William Makepeace Thackeray, writing for the first time in his own name. The novel was printed in 20 monthly parts between January 1847 and July 1848. The first three had already been completed before publication, while the others were written after it had begun to sell. Vanity Fair was the first work that Thackeray published under his own name and was extremely well-received at the time. After the conclusion of its serial publication, it was printed as a bound volume by Bradbury & Evans in 1848 and was quickly picked up by other London printers as well. As a collected work, the novel bore the subtitle A Novel without a Hero. (Note: In addition to its other intentions, the name was a jab at Thomas Carlyle's "Lectures on Hero and Hero-Worship".) By the end of 1859, royalties on Vanity Fair had only given Thackeray about £2000, a third of his take from The Virginians, but the novel was responsible for his still more lucrative lecture tours in Britain and the United States. (Note: In the letter where he recorded these sums, Thackeray noted "Three more years please the Fates and the girls will have eight or ten thousand a-piece that I want for them: we must n't say a word against filthy lucre for I see the use and comfort of it every day more and more. What a blessing not to mind about bills.")
- March–April – Ivan Goncharov's debut novel A Common Story («Обыкновенная история», Obyknovennaya istorya) is published in Sovremennik (Saint Petersburg).
- March 20 – The String of Pearls, probably written by James Malcolm Rymer and Thomas Peckett Prest, concludes its serial publication in the 'penny dreadful' The People's Periodical issued by Edward Lloyd in London, begun in November 1846. This is the first literary appearance of Sweeney Todd.
- April – Robert Browning settles with his wife and fellow poet Elizabeth Barrett Browning in Florence.

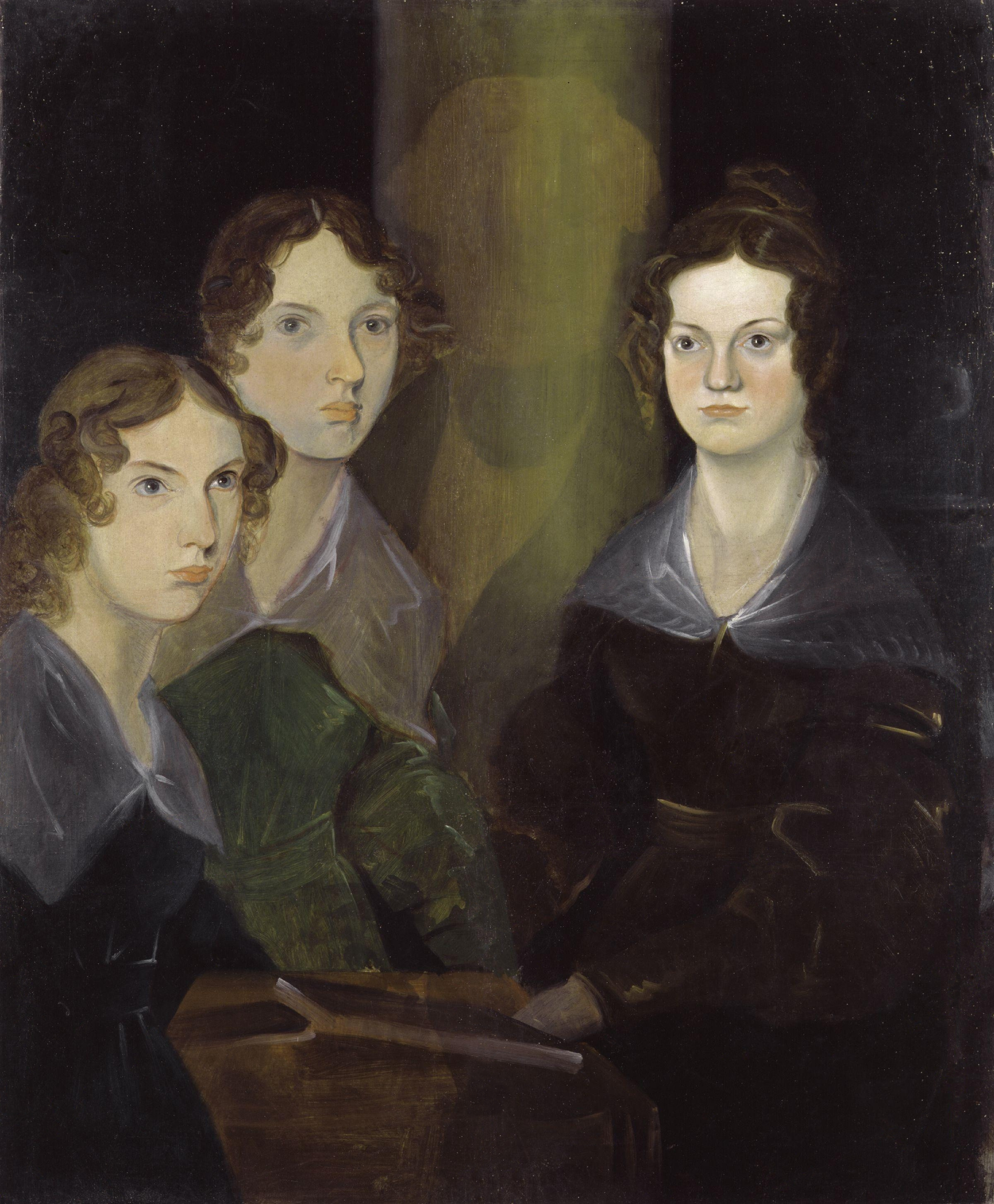
Anne, Emily, and Charlotte Brontë, by their brother Branwell (who has painted himself out of the picture)

- June
  - Elizabeth Gaskell's first published work of fiction, the story "Life in Manchester: Libbie Marsh's Three Eras", appears in Howitt's Journal of Literature and Popular Progress under the pen name Cotton Mather Mills.
  - Hans Christian Andersen begins his first visit to Britain, during which he meets Charles Dickens.
- June 10 – The fictional date at the end of Anne Brontë's The Tenant of Wildfell Hall is presumed to be that of the novel's completion.
- July – The London publisher Thomas Cautley Newby accepts for publication Emily Brontë's Wuthering Heights and Anne Brontë's Agnes Grey.
- August 7–24 – Charlotte Brontë completes Jane Eyre at Haworth and sends the manuscript to her publisher, who has rejected The Professor.
- September – Varney the Vampire; or, the Feast of Blood, probably written by James Malcolm Rymer and Thomas Preskett Prest, having been published serially since 1845 as a 'penny dreadful' by Edward Lloyd in London, is first issued in book format. It introduces many of the tropes of vampire fiction.
- September 16 – William Shakespeare's house of birth in Stratford-upon-Avon in England is bought by the United Shakespeare Company for preservation. This year also, Schiller's house in Weimar is opened to the public as a museum.
- October 19 – Charlotte Brontë's Jane Eyre is published (as "an autobiography, edited by Currer Bell") in London by Smith, Elder & Co. in 3 volumes.
- November – Dmitry Grigorovich's anti-serfdom novel Anton Goremyka («Антон-горемыка», "Luckless Anton") is published in Sovremennik with its politically sensitive last scene rewritten by a censor.
- November 1 – John Maddison Morton's one-act farce Box and Cox (adapted from the French) opens at the Lyceum Theatre, London (under the new management of Madame Vestris and her husband Charles James Mathews) with John Pritt Harley and John Baldwin Buckstone in the title roles.
- December 14 – Emily Brontë's Wuthering Heights and Anne Brontë's Agnes Grey are published in a three-volume set under the pen names of Ellis and Acton Bell respectively, in London by T. C. Newby. Wuthering Heights will be Emily's only published novel, as she dies a year later, aged 30.
- unknown date – The London publisher E. Churton brings out the first six of George Sand's books to be issued in English, as translated by Matilda Hays, Eliza Ashurst and Rev. Edmund Larken.

== New books ==
=== Fiction ===
- Honoré de Balzac – Le Cousin Pons and "Cousin Bette"
- Anne Brontë (as Acton Bell) – Agnes Grey
- Charlotte Brontë (as Currer Bell) – Jane Eyre
- Emily Brontë (as Ellis Bell) – Wuthering Heights
- Benjamin Disraeli – Tancred
- Alexandre Dumas – The Vicomte of Bragelonne: Ten Years Later (Le Vicomte de Bragelonne, ou Dix ans plus tard; serialization begins; in English usually in three parts, The Vicomte of Bragelonne, Louise de la Vallière, The Man in the Iron Mask)
- Ivan Goncharov – A Common Story
- Catherine Gore – Castles in The Air
- Dmitry Grigorovich – Anton Goremyka
- James Sheridan Knowles – George Lovell
- Eliza Lynn Linton – Azeth, The Egyptian
- Herman Melville – Omoo
- G. W. M. Reynolds – Faust: A Romance of the Secret Tribunals
- George Sand – Le Péché de M. Antoine (The Sin of M. Antoine)
- Harriet Anne Scott – The Hen-Pecked Husband
- The Sobieski Stuarts – Tales of the Century: or Sketches of the romance of history between the years 1746 and 1846
- Eugène Sue
  - Martin l'enfant trouvé ou Mémoires d'un valet de chambre (Martin the Foundling, publication completed)
  - Les Sept pêchés capitaux (The Seven Deadly Sins, publication begins)
- William Makepeace Thackeray – Vanity Fair (serialisation)
- Charlotte Elizabeth Tonna – The System
- Anthony Trollope – The Macdermots of Ballycloran

=== Children and young people ===
- Frederick Marryat – The Children of the New Forest

=== Drama ===
- John Baldwin Buckstone
  - The Flowers of the Forest
  - The Green Bushes
- Gustav Freytag – Graf Waldemar
- Richard Brinsley Peake –
  - Gabrielli
  - The Title Deeds

=== Poetry ===
- Heinrich Heine – Atta Troll
- Henry Wadsworth Longfellow – Evangeline
- Petar II Petrović-Njegoš, Prince-Bishop of Montenegro – The Mountain Wreath (Горски вијенац, Gorski vijenac), Serbian epic verse drama
- Edgar Allan Poe – Ulalume
- Raja Ali Haji or his sister Saleha – Syair Abdul Muluk
- Christina Rossetti – Verses by Christina G. Rossetti
- Alfred Tennyson – The Princess

=== Non-fiction ===
- Hans Christian Andersen – The Fairy Tale of My Life (Das Märchen meines Lebens ohne Dichtung, autobiography)
- William Wells Brown – Narrative of William W. Brown, a Fugitive Slave, Written by Himself
- Andrew Jackson Davis – The Principles of Nature
- Søren Kierkegaard – Works of Love (Kjerlighedens Gjerninger)
- Karl Marx – The Poverty of Philosophy (Misère de la philosophie)
- William H. Prescott – A History of the Conquest of Peru

== Births ==
- January 6 – Milovan Glišić, Serbian dramatist and translator (died 1908)
- January 8 – Matei Donici, Bessarabian Romanian poet and professional soldier (died 1921)
- January 9 – Oyyarathu Chandu Menon, Indian Malayalam-language novelist (died 1899)
- January 27 – Ella Dietz, American actress and author (died 1920)
- April 2 – Flora Annie Steel (Flora Annie Webster), English writer (died 1929)
- April 7 – Jens Peter Jacobsen, Danish novelist (died 1885)
- April 10 – Joseph Pulitzer, Hungarian American newspaperman (died 1911)
- April 10 – Clarissa Caldwell Lathrop, American social reformer and autobiographer (died 1892)
- June 16 – Luella Dowd Smith, American educator and author (died 1941)
- August 20 – Bolesław Prus (Aleksander Głowacki), Polish novelist (died 1912)
- September 2 – George Robert Sims, English writer (died 1922)
- September 22 – Alice Meynell (Alice Thompson), English poet (died 1922)
- October 1 – Annie Besant, English women's rights activist, writer and orator (died 1933)
- October 3 – Lilian Whiting, American journalist, editor, and author (died 1942)
- October 18 – E. E. Brown, American author and artist (year of death unknown)
- October 19 – Aurilla Furber, American author, editor, and activist (died 1898)
- November 8 – Bram Stoker, Irish novelist and theater manager (died 1912)
- December 17 – Émile Faguet, French writer and critic (died 1916)
- December 26 – Hugh Conway, English novelist (died 1885)
- unknown date:
  - Eunice Gibbs Allyn, American correspondent, author, songwriter (died 1916)
  - Maria Fetherstonhaugh, English novelist (died 1918)

== Deaths ==
- January – Abbasgulu Bakikhanov, Azerbaijani historian and philosopher (born 1794)
- February 8 – George Walker, English Gothic novelist (born 1772)
- April 23 – Erik Gustaf Geijer, Swedish historian, poet, philosopher, and composer (born 1783)
- May 4 – Alexandre Vinet, Swiss critic and theologian (born 1797)
- August 14 – Frans Michael Franzén, Swedish writer (born 1772)
- August 28 – Eugène Bourgeois, French dramatist (born 1818)
- September 16 – Grace Aguilar, English novelist (born 1816)
- October 13 – Johann Heinrich van Ess, German theologian (born 1772)
- October 22 – Henriette Herz, German salon hostess (born 1764)
- December 14 – Dorothy Ann Thrupp, hymnwriter and translator (born 1779)

== Sources ==
- Milne, Kirsty (2015), At Vanity Fair: From Bunyan to Thackeray, Cambridge: Cambridge University Press, ISBN 9781107105850.
- Sutherland, John (1988), The Longman Companion to Victorian Fiction, Pearson Education, ISBN 9781317863335, reprinted 2009 by Routledge.
- Wilson, James Grant; et al. (1970), Thackeray in the United States: 1852–3, 1855–6: Including a Record of a Variety of Thackerayana, vol. I & II, New York: Haskell House Publishers.
