= 1846 in literature =

This article contains information about the literary events and publications of 1846.

== Events ==
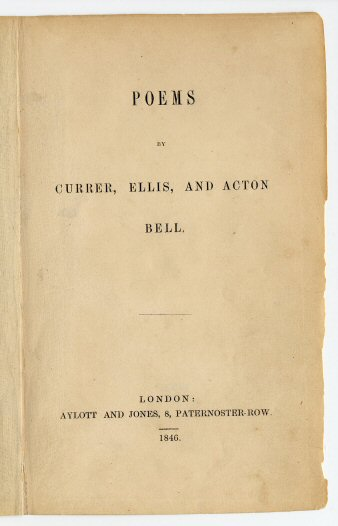
One of the year's least successful publications

- January 3 – The American author Edgar Allan Poe issues the final edition of the Broadway Journal, a journal he owned for just a few months. The Broadway Journal attempted to be a more serious intellectual journal, compared to others at the time. Because of this, it had a smaller audience and was less financially successful. It emphasized literary reviews but also featured criticism of Art, theater, and music as well as poetry and articles on politics.
- January 15 – Fyodor Dostoevsky's first original novel, Poor Folk (Бедные люди, Bednye Lyudi), is published in the St. Petersburg Collection. Poor Folk explores poverty and the relationship between the poor and the rich, common themes of literary naturalism. Largely influenced by Nikolai Gogol's The Overcoat, Alexander Pushkin's The Stationmaster and Letters of Abelard and Heloise by Peter Abelard and Héloïse d’Argenteuil, it is an epistolary novel composed of letters written by Varvara and her close friend Makar Devushkin. The name of the book and the main female character were adapted from Nikolai Karamzin's Poor Liza.
- January 21 – The daily newspaper The Daily News, edited by Charles Dickens, first appears in London. It was conceived as a radical rival to the right-wing Morning Chronicle. After 17 issues Dickens hands over as editor to his friend John Forster. Forster ran the paper until 1870. The newspaper continued until 1930, when it merged with the Daily Chronicle to form the centre-left News Chronicle.
- April
  - Hans Christian Andersen's Fairy Tales are first translated into English, beginning with "The Little Mermaid" in Bentley's Miscellany.
  - Poe's essay "The Philosophy of Composition" is published in Graham's Magazine.
- c. May 22 – The Brontë sisters' first published work, the collection Poems by Currer, Ellis, and Acton Bell, appears in London. It sells only two copies in the first year.
- June 27 – Charlotte Brontë completes the manuscript of her novel The Professor. It is offered to several publishers during the year but rejected.
- August 15 – The Scott Monument to Sir Walter Scott in Edinburgh (Scotland) is inaugurated.
- September 12 – The poets Elizabeth Barrett and Robert Browning marry privately in St Marylebone Parish Church, London, and depart for the continent a week later.
- October 1 – Serial publication of Charles Dickens's Dombey and Son begins.
- November 21 – The String of Pearls: a Romance, probably written by James Malcolm Rymer, begins serialization in Britain. This is the first literary appearance of Sweeney Todd.
- unknown dates
  - Mary Howitt's Wonderful Stories for Children is the first English translation of works by Hans Christian Andersen to be published in book format.
  - Isaac D. Baker and Charles Scribner form the New York City publisher Baker & Scribner, predecessor of Charles Scribner's Sons.

== New books ==
=== Fiction ===
- Honoré de Balzac - Cousin Bette (written)
- Charlotte Brontë - The Professor (written)
- Edward Bulwer-Lytton – The Children of the Night
- James Fenimore Cooper – The Redskins
- Charles Dickens – The Battle of Life (novella)
- Fyodor Dostoevsky
  - The Double: A Petersburg Poem («Двойник», Dvoynik (novella))
  - Poor Folk («Бедные люди», Bednye Lyudi)
- Alexandre Dumas, père
  - Le Chevalier de Maison-Rouge (The Knight of the Maison-Rouge: A Novel of Marie Antoinette)
  - The Count of Monte Cristo (Le Comte de Monte-Cristo, serialization concluded; first English translation)
- Thomas Dunn English – MDCCCXLII, or The Power of the "S. F"
- Dmitry Grigorovich – The Village («Деревня», Derevnya)
- Nathaniel Hawthorne – Mosses from an Old Manse
- Douglas Jerrold
  - The Chronicles of Clovernook
  - Mrs Caudle's Curtain Lectures
- Mór Jókai – Weekdays (Hétköznapok)
- James Sheridan Knowles – Fortescue
- Frederick Marryat – The Privateersman
- Herman Melville – Typee
- James Malcolm Rymer - The String of Pearls
- George Sand – La Mare au Diable (The Devil's Pond)

=== Children ===
- Anne Knight – School-Room Lyrics
- Hannah and Mary Townsend – The Anti-Slavery Alphabet

=== Drama ===
- Paul Bocage – Échec et mat
- Carolina Coronado – El cuadro de la esperanza
- Gustav Freytag – Die Valentine
- Eugène Marin Labiche and Auguste Lefranc – Frisette
- George William Lovell
  - Look Before You Leap
  - The Wife's Secret
- Martins Pena – first performances
  - A Barriga do Meu Tio
  - Os Ciúmes de um Pedestre, ou O Terrível Capitão do Mato
  - As Desgraças de uma Criança
  - Os Meirinhos
  - Um Segredo de Estado
  - O Usurário
- Joseph Isidore Samson – La Famille poisson

=== Poetry ===
- Gottfried Keller – Gedichte (Poems)
- Edward Lear – Book of Nonsense
- Henry Wadsworth Longfellow – The Belfry of Bruges

=== Non-fiction ===
- Selim Aga – Incidents Connected with the Life of Selim Aga, A Native of Central Africa
- Mary Anne Atwood (as Θυος Μαθος) – Early Magnetism in its Higher Relations to Humanity
- Curtis H. Cavender (as H.C. Decanver) – Catalogue of Works in Refutation of Methodism
- Charles Dickens – Pictures from Italy
- F. W. Fairholt – Costume in England
- George Grote – A History of Greece (publication begins)
- George W. Johnson – A Dictionary of Gardening
- Søren Kierkegaard – Concluding Unscientific Postscript to Philosophical Fragments (Afsluttende uvidenskabelig Efterskrift til de philosophiske Smuler)
- David Strauss – The Life of Jesus, Critically Examined, translated by George Eliot from Das Leben Jesu, kritisch bearbeitet
- Theodor Waitz – Grundlegung der Psychologie (Foundation of Psychology)
- William Whewell – Elements of Morality

== Births ==
- March 17 – Kate Greenaway, English book illustrator and writer (died 1901)
- March 20 – Rebecca Richardson Joslin, American non-fiction writer (died 1934)
- March 25 – Helen Zimmern, German-born English writer and translator (died 1934)
- April 4 – Comte de Lautreamont (pen name of Isidore Lucien Ducasse), Uruguayan-born French poet and writer (died 1870)
- April 24 – Marcus Clarke, Australian novelist and poet (died 1881)
- May 5 – Henryk Sienkiewicz, Polish novelist (died 1916)
- May 25 – Naim Frashëri, Albanian poet (died 1900)
- June 3 – Estelle Mendell Amory, American educator and author (died 1923)
- June 30 – Frances Margaret Milne, Irish-born American author and librarian (died 1910)
- July 5 – Christian Reid (pen name of Frances Christine Fisher Tiernan), American author (died 1920)
- August 2 – Lucy Clifford (née Lucy Lane), English novelist, dramatist and screenwriter (died 1929)
- August 5
  - Louise Manning Hodgkins, American educator, author, and editor (died 1935)
  - Alvilde Prydz, Norwegian novelist (died 1922)
- September 3 – Emma Shaw Colcleugh, American author (died 1940)
- October 1 – John Cadvan Davies, Welsh poet and Wesleyan Methodist minister (died 1923)
- October 21 – Edmondo De Amicis, Italian novelist, journalist, poet and short-story writer (died 1908)
- unknown date – Mary Foot Seymour, American businesswoman and writer (died 1893)

== Deaths ==
- January 6 – Lewis Goldsmith, Anglo-French journalist (born c. 1763)
- February 9 – Henry Gally Knight, English writer and traveler (born 1786)
- March 10 – Harriette Wilson, English memoirist (born 1786)
- June 24 – Jan Frans Willems, Flemish poet and political activist (born 1793)
- July 12 – Charlotte Elizabeth Tonna, English novelist (born 1790)
- September 4 – Victor-Joseph Étienne de Jouy, French dramatist (born 1764)
- November 23 – George Darley, Irish poet, novelist, and critic (born 1795)
- December 13 – Pasquale Galluppi, Italian philosopher (born 1770)

== Awards ==
- Chancellor's Gold Medal – Edward Henry Bickersteth
- Newdigate Prize – G. O. Morgan

== Sources ==
- Apollonio, Carol (2009). Dostoevsky's Secrets: Reading Against the Grain. Northwestern University Press. ISBN 978-0-8101-2532-2.
- Frank, Joseph (2009). Dostoevsky: A Writer in His Time. Vol. 1–5. Princeton University Press. ISBN 978-0-691-12819-1.
- Mochulsky, Konstantin (1973). Dostoevsky: His Life and Work. Princeton University Press. ISBN 0-691-01299-7.
