= Radishchevskoye Urban Settlement =

Radishchevskoye Urban Settlement is the name of several municipal formations in Russia.

- Radishchevskoye Urban Settlement, a municipal formation which the work settlement of Radishchev in Nizhneilimsky District of Irkutsk Oblast is incorporated as
- Radishchevskoye Urban Settlement, a municipal formation which Radishchevsky Settlement Okrug in Radishchevsky District of Ulyanovsk Oblast is incorporated as

== See also ==
- Radishchevsky
