= Radishchevo =

Radishchevo (Russian: Радищево) is the name of several inhabited localities in Russia.

Urban localities

- Radishchevo, Ulyanovsk Oblast, a work settlement under the administrative jurisdiction of Radishchevsky Settlement Okrug in Radishchevsky District of Ulyanovsk Oblast

Rural localities

- Radishchevo, Kaluga Oblast, a village in Maloyaroslavetsky District of Kaluga Oblast
- Radishchevo, Krasnodar Krai, a selo in Sovetsky Rural Okrug of Novokubansky District of Krasnodar Krai
- Radishchevo, Moscow Oblast, a settlement in Peshkovskoye Rural Settlement of Solnechnogorsky District of Moscow Oblast
- Radishchevo, Novgorod Oblast, a village in Tregubovskoye Settlement of Chudovsky District of Novgorod Oblast
- Radishchevo, Omsk Oblast, a village in Novotroitsky Rural Okrug of Nizhneomsky District of Omsk Oblast
- Radishchevo, Oryol Oblast, a village in Troitsky Selsoviet of Orlovsky District of Oryol Oblast
- Radishchevo, Penza Oblast, a selo in Annenkovsky Selsoviet of Kuznetsky District of Penza Oblast
- Radishchevo, Novoburassky District, Saratov Oblast, a selo in Novoburassky District of Saratov Oblast
- Radishchevo, Novouzensky District, Saratov Oblast, a settlement in Novouzensky District of Saratov Oblast

== See also ==
- Radishchev, an urban locality (a work settlement) in Irkutsk Oblast, Russia
