= Radishchev (disambiguation) =

Radishchev is an urban locality (an urban-type settlement) in Irkutsk Oblast, Russia.

Radishchev may also refer to:

- Alexander Radishchev (1749-1802), Russian author and social critic

== See also ==
- Radishchevo, several inhabited localities in Russia
