= Radishchevsky =

Radishchevsky (masculine), Radishchevskaya (feminine), or Radishchevskoye (neuter) may refer to:

- Radishchevsky District, a district of Ulyanovsk Oblast, Russia
- Radishchevskoye Urban Settlement, several municipal urban settlements in Russia
