= Anton Goremyka =

1847 novel by Dmitry Grigorovich

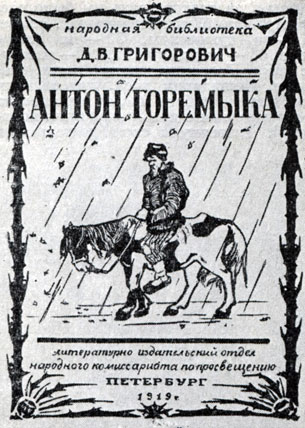
- Author: Dmitry Grigorovich
- Original title: Антон-горемыка
- Language: Russian
- Publisher: Sovremennik
- Publication date: 1847
- Publication place: Russian Empire
- Media type: Print (hardback & paperback)
- Preceded by: The Village

Anton-Goremyka (Russian: Антон-горемыка, Luckless Anton) is a novel by Dmitry Grigorovich, first published by Sovremennik, in 1847, vol. 6, issue XI. In retrospect it is regarded as arguably the strongest anti-serfdom statement in the Russian literature of its time.

== Background ==
Grigorovich wrote Anton Goremyka in the summer of 1847, while in the country. The plot had been conceived in Saint Petersburg earlier that year. The young author also had talks with Nikolay Nekrasov who assured him that he would be more than happy to see the novel published in his own magazine. "Before my leaving the city for the country, and later in a personal letter, Nekrasov insisted that I should send the novel promptly to his journal," Grigorovich later remembered. "By this time I've already had more experience, so the storyline could be constructed more carefully. Besides, I now had better knowledge of the common people's ways and language. Nevertheless, this novel demanded no lesser work, may be even more than the first one," the author wrote in his autobiographical notes. After the novel (which he himself felt very pleased with) was finished, Grigorovich sent it to Nekrasov and soon learned that "both Nekrasov and Panayev liked it a lot."

Grigorovich has read the novel for the first time in Nekrasov's house. Ivan Panayev's cousin, also a member of the audience, remembered how touched and disturbed were all present. "Avdotya Panayeva burst into tears. Panayev and Nekrasov sat still without motion, I sobbed in the fartherst corner of a divan. 'Do not be ashamed of your tears and mark my words,... what Grigorovich has just read, will have enormous bearing not just on the state of our literature, but on the nation in general,' Panayev pronounced, addressing the teenager.

== History ==
Originally Anton Goremyka ended with a scene of riot, serf peasants setting manager Nikita Fyodorovich's house on fire and pushing the hated tyrant into it. As such it was promptly rejected by the censorship committee. Alexander Nikitenko, an influential censor who happened to be a member of the Sovremennik staff, managed to persuade his colleagues in the Committee otherwise. What he did first, though, was completely re-write the final scene himself. "Without informing anybody, Nikitenko made up the finale of his own, in which the manager remains alive, while the rioters, before the deportation, repent publicly," Grigorovich wrote. "Censors have all but crashed it, then the finale was changed, the scene of a mob riot removed," Vissarion Belinsky informed Vasily Botkin in a letter.

Anton Goremyka was included into the list of the "most dangerous publications of the year," alongside articles by Belinsky and Hertzen, by the Special Literature and Publishing Committee.

== Reception and legacy ==
As The Village a year earlier, Anton Goremyka caused controversy and divided the critics. Vissarion Belinsky supported the author wholeheartedly. "The first two books by D. Grigorovich which triggered heated discussions, have been greeted most sympathetically by our critic. [Belinsky] recognised in them the dawning of a new era when young gifted authors would start to reveal the truth, particularly about the realities of our rural life," Pavel Annenkov wrote in his memoirs.

Anton Goremyka was praised by Mikhail Saltykov-Shchedrin who wrote years later: "The Village and Anton Goremyka - I remember them as vividly as if it were yesterday. It was like the first fruitful spring rain pouring upon us, first human tears sprinkling upon the Russian literature's soil. The notion of Russian muzhik as a human being was brought to the Russian literature by Grigorovich."

In his October 17, 1893, letter Leo Tolstoy wrote to Grigorovich: "You are a man most dear to me, especially due to the unforgettable effect your first two novels have had upon me… How enraptured and touched was I, the 16 year old boy, as I've read Anton Goremyka for the first time to marvel at this unbelievable revelation, that one could write about muzhik, our nurturer and, if I may say so, spiritual teacher, not as of a landscape's detail, but as of a real man, and to write with love, respect and even some trepidation."

Alexander Hertzen remembered how Anton Goremyka had awakened in him deep patriotic feelings and made him look closer at the life of common people in Russia. "I read Anton Goremyka for the first time in 1848, while in Naples. This stark story of a peasant man prosecuted by a burmister whom he'd compiled a report on, dictated by fellow villagers... seemed especially harsh in the atmosphere of the revolutionary movement in Italy, under the sweet caressing touch of Mediterranean air. I felt ashamed to be where I was at the time. The picture of a simple man, emaciated, good-natured and meek, innocent and yet shackled and making his way to Siberia, has been haunting me for some time."

According to Chernyshevsky, "the early works by Grigorovich and Turgenev have prepared the readership for the scathing satire of Saltykov-Shchedrin, by sawing the seeds of a profound notion, that to start moving towards prosperity Russia should learn to see itself in true light first."

According to the modern Grigorovich scholar A.Meshcheryakov, Anton Goremyka "in certain ways opened up a new literary horizons, being the protean epic peasant life novel, the subgenre, later to be successfully exploited by many prominent Russian writers, including Grigorovich himself."
