= Catalogue of Works in Refutation of Methodism =

Book by Curtis H. Cavender

Catalogue of Works in Refutation of Methodism: from its Origin in 1729, to the Present Time
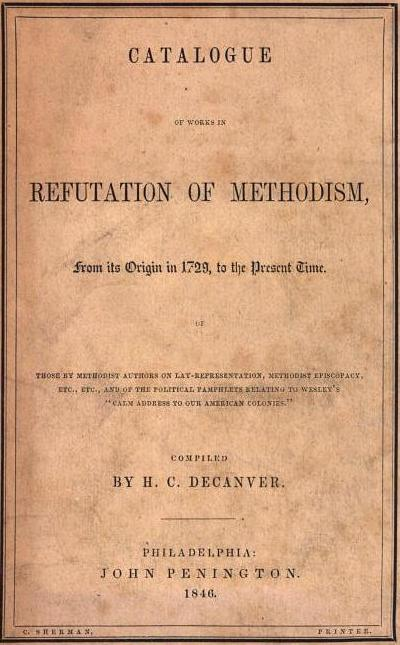
- A photocopyed facsimile of a lightly corroded front cover from the original, first paperback edition of Catalogue of Works in Refutation of Methodism, printed in 1846.
- Author: H.C. Decanver (Curtis H. Cavender)
- Language: English
- Subject: Anti-Methodism
- Genre: Reference work
- Publisher: John Penington
- Publication date: 1846
- Publication place: United States
- Media type: Print (hardcover, paperback)
- Pages: 54
- OCLC: 314794301

Catalogue of Works in Refutation of Methodism: from its Origin in 1729, to the Present Time (often referred to as Catalogue of Works in Refutation of Methodism) is the title of an antiquarian bibliography or catalogue first published in America in 1846 by the 19th century author Curtis H. Cavender, who compiled the work under the anagrammatic pen name of H.C. Decanver.

A reference work of religious criticism, the Catalogue is Decanver's debut publication, and his only written work. It is notable as one of the most prominent writings critical of Methodist doctrine ever written, and remains the only compilation of books written from a primarily anti-Methodist perspective.

== Background ==
An otherwise virtually unknown individual, the only evidence which suggests that the author Decanver ever existed was the publication of his Catalogue in 1846. He was self-evidently opposed to the doctrines of Methodism, a branch of Protestant Christianity which emerged from the teachings of John Wesley in 18th century England, and in 1846 compiled the catalogue under the full title of Catalogue of Works in Refutation of Methodism: from its Origin in 1729, to the Present Time: of Those by Methodist Authors on Lay-Representation, Methodist Episcopacy, Etc., Etc., and of the Political Pamphlets Relating to Wesley's "Calm Address to Our American Colonies". The pseudonym "H.C. Decanver" is an anagram of the author's actual name, Curtis H. Cavender.

The book was first published in both hardback and paperback by the presently-defunct John Penington publishing company, once located on 10 South Fifth Street in eastern Philadelphia. The original printings were attributed to an individual "C. Sherman, printer" from 19 St. James Street in the same city.

There are several editions of the book, some including minor changes deviating from former editions.

The catalogue as a whole lists over 100 individual documents, books, pamphlets and articles — many of which today are regarded as historical texts. As a whole the works listed assumedly refute certain doctrines of Methodist thought, although – if somewhat ironically – many of them are by Methodist authors themselves.

== Contents ==
The book is divided into two sections, the first being a preface entitled either "Prefatory Remarks" or "Preliminary Remarks", depending upon the edition of the book (the first edition of the work was printed containing the latter title), and the second being the catalogue proper – in all editions simply deemed "Catalogue". The Catalogue section is itself divided further, the first group of works representing those called "Anti-Methodistical", the second group listed under "Methodist Authors" (being by Methodist authors themselves), the third called "Miscellaneous", and the last group listed as "Political".
