= The Fishermen (Grigorovich novel) =

The Fishermen (Russian: Рыбаки) is a novel by Dmitri Grigorovich, first published in 1853.

== Setting ==
The Fishermen is a story of life among the peasants of northern Tula, where the broad Oka River flows through a level country to empty into the Volga at Nizhni Novgorod. These peasants get their living by fishing. Grigorovich, like most Russian writers, concerns himself with types of character.

Grigorovich was doubly an artist. His training as a painter and as the historian of art served him well in depicting the river landscape in every aspect. The landscape is described in all the varying seasons of the year. Many of the word pictures are veritable poems. Village life is also described with humor and realism. This is especially notable when some of the peasants visit the annual market, where episodes of traffic and of drunkenness occur.

== Plot ==
All the persons introduced are muzhiks; there is no introduction of “high life.” The plot is as simple as that of a Greek drama, but it touches the deepest springs of human life: honor and treachery, pure unselfish love and ignoble passion, joy and tragedy. The principal persons are found in the izba of the patriarchal old fisherman, Glyeb Savinitch, whose large family is increased at the beginning of the action by the adoption of a mischievous and surly little boy, Grishka, the son, born out of wedlock, to “Uncle Akim,” a distant relative of Glyeb's wife, Anna Savelyevna, a ne'er-do-well, boastful, idle, lazy and improvident, who comes to Glyeb's home to beg shelter and shortly afterward dies there, painfully and pathetically, leaving his “godson” for his relatives to bring up.

On the other side of the river lives Uncle Kondrati with his granddaughter, the gentle and charming Dunya. Glyeb and Kondrati are contrasted: the one proud, powerful, moody, violent-tempered (generally just and kindly), full of peasant wisdom often expressed in clever proverbs; the other calm, serene, religious and noble.

The story is a tragedy in humble life. Grigorovich, as few other modern writers, succeeds in truthfully contrasting vice and depravity with the virtues of unselfishness and pure love, the ugly traits of human nature with the finer qualities which often exist side by side in the same characters. But Grigorovich is never pessimistic; in the end some element of good triumphs.

== Editions ==
The Fishermen was published toward the end of Grigorovich's most brilliant and fruitful period, which lasted from 1847 until 1855. An English translation, anonymous, was published in New York in 1917, with a brief foreword by Angelo S. Rappoport.
