= The Village (Grigorovich novel) =

1846 novel by Dmitry Grigorovich

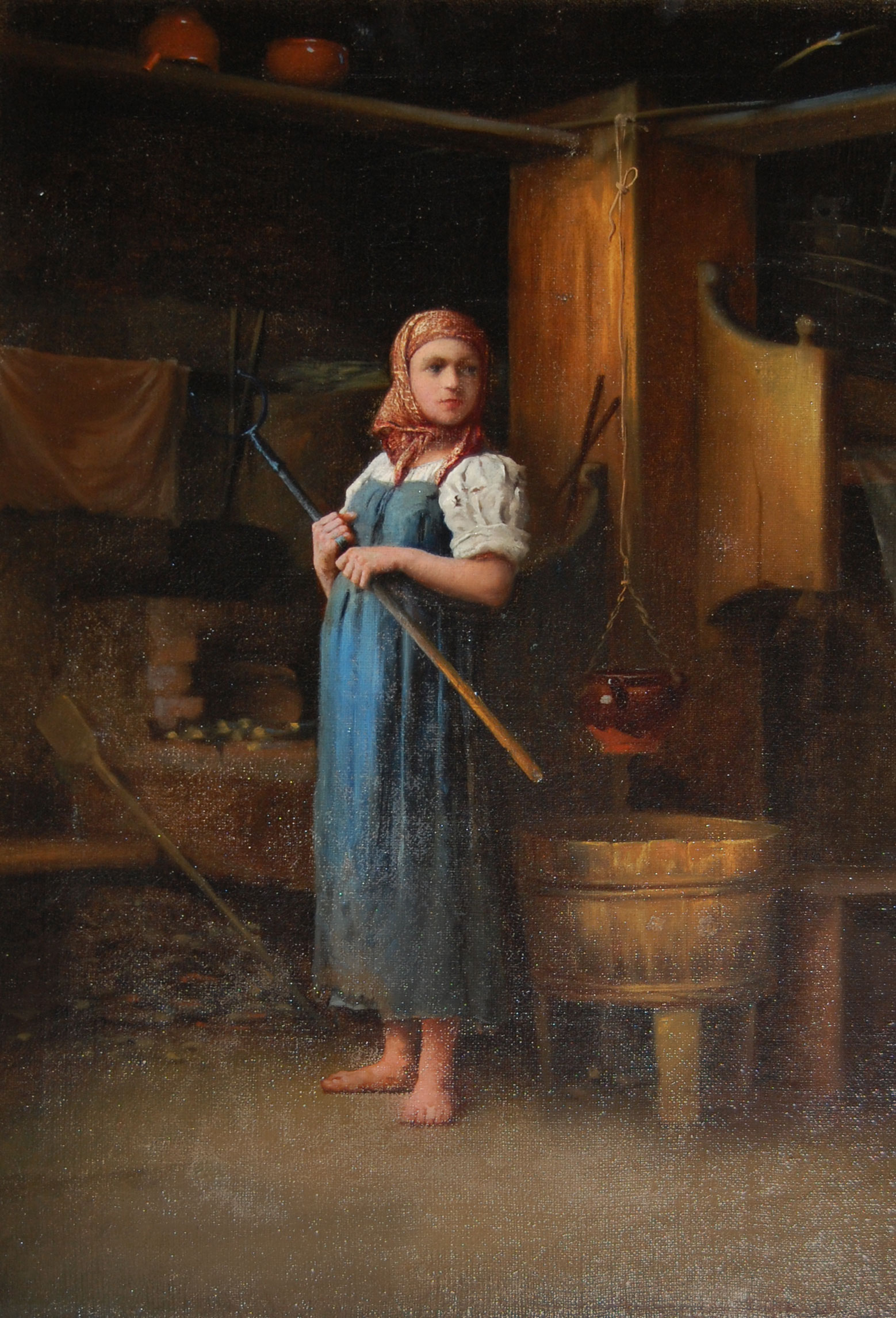
- Village Girl by Rafail Levitsky
- Author: Dmitry Grigorovich
- Original title: Деревня
- Language: Russian
- Publisher: Otechestvennye Zapiski
- Publication date: 1846
- Publication place: Russian Empire
- Media type: Print (hardback & paperback)
- Followed by: Anton Goremyka

The Village (Russian: Деревня, romanized: Derevnya) was the debut novel of Dmitry Grigorovich, first published by Otechestvennye Zapiski (Vol. XLIX, book 12) in 1846. It had a strong impact on Russian literary society, and was praised for being "the first work in the Russian literature to face the real peasant's life" by Ivan Turgenev.

== Background ==
1845-1846 were the years when Grigorovich was very close to authors of Otechestvennye Zapiski, its leading critic Vissarion Belinsky in particular. According to Fyodor Dostoyevsky, having published the Saint Petersburg Organ-Grinders in the spring of 1945, the young writer was planning to spend that summer in his village, but before departure stayed at the house of Nikolai Nekrasov. Not long before that, Belinsky published the Works by Alexey Koltsov, providing the foreword to it, which featured profound analysis of the poet's legacy. Grigoroivich took the book to the country with him and read it several times, enchanted by both Koltsov's verse and Belinsky's article. All of The Village' chapters are provided with epigraphs, and three of them (to Chapters 3, 4 and 8) come from poems by Koltsov.

== History ==
The story of Akulina told in The Village was based on a real life tragedy. In the village owned by Grigorovich's mother, a young woman was forcefully married and subsequently beaten to death by her husband.

"I worked over the text - especially of the first chapters - diligently, re-writing it many times. After four years of continuous writing I finally went with it to Petersburg," the author remembered. There he brought the manuscript to Sovremennik, but Nekrasov for some reason overlooked it and the novel was published by Andrey Krayevsky's Otechestvennye Zapiski. "Its success surpassed all my expectations, probably due to its subject matter's originality: nobody had ever written a novel about every day Russian peasantry life before," Grigorovich wrote later.

The novel was strongly supported by Vissarion Belinsky, first in his essay "The 1846 Russian Literature Review", then the article "The Answer to Moskvityanin". Choosing for an example the caricature by M.L. Nevakhovich in Yeralash magazine (1847, book I, page 5) where Grogorovich was shown as someone searching in a garbage can, he lashed against the critics for whom the novel was too realistic and, by default, 'dirty'.

According to modern critic and biographer A. Meshcheryakov, in The Village Grigorovich's attempt to make a move from a set-of-sketches kind of documentary collage to a novel genre was not entirely successful. The sketch-like quality here prevailed, especially in that the inner world of his heroine was obviously of a lesser interest to the author than myriads of details of the Russian rural life. Still, those were the years when the Natural School movement in Russia was getting closer to the very bottom of a real life and Grigorovich's debut has played a decisive role, according to the critic.

The Village proved to be a healthy antidote to the officially approved "peasant literature" propagated by journals like Mayak (Lighthouse), praising good-natured, God-loving Russian muzhik and his benevolent, caring master. The novel was regarded as the strongest statement against the system of serfdom of its time. Characteristically, the original version where Akulina's landlord was shown as a tyrant, has been changed to a more neutral portrait, a clear sign of the author's seeing the system, not its particular proponents, as the real evil, according to A. Meshcheryakov.
