= Frances Margaret Milne =

Irish-born American author and librarian

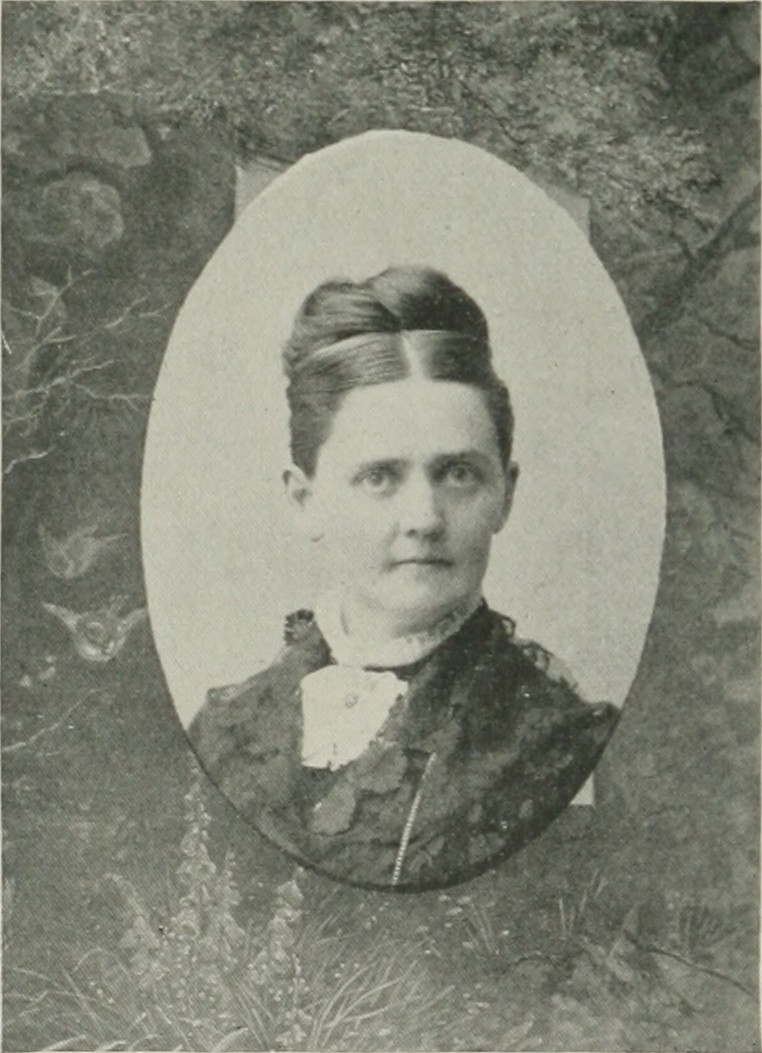
- Photo in A Woman of the Century
- Born: June 30, 1846; North of Ireland
- Died: April 1910 (aged 63); California, U.S.
- Occupations: writer, librarian
- Spouse: Mr. Milne
- Writing career
- Pen name: "Margaret Frances"
- Language: English

Frances Margaret Milne (pen name, Margaret Frances; June 30, 1846 – April 1910) was an Irish-born American author and librarian of the long nineteenth century. With her family, she removed from Ireland, to Pennsylvania, and then to California where she wrote for various journals. Her works included, For to-day : poems (1893), A cottage gray and other poems (1895), Heliotrope (1897), Our little roman, verses of childhood (1902), and Passing of the village (1902). She was interested in the single-tax movement.

== Biography ==
Frances Margaret Milne was born in the north of Ireland, June 30, 1846. In 1849, her parents came to the United States and settled in Pennsylvania. In 1869, her family moved to [California. She was educated mainly at home. From her 13th to her 16th year, she attended a public school. Her training was quite thorough, and her reading covered a wide range of authors.

Milne was married in California. She began to write, in both prose and verse, in early life, and her work attracted attention. She published poems in the San Francisco Star and many other prominent Pacific-coast journals. For some years, she made her home in San Luis Obispo, California, where she served as the librarian of the San Luis Obispo Free Public Library. In 1883, she became interested in the single-tax movement, and many of her songs were written in the interest of that movement. She made a profound study of economic and political questions, and with pen and voice, she aided in extending the discussion of the relations of progress and poverty, and of individuals and society. Subsequent to the publication of her earliest productions in the Cincinnati Christian Standard, she wrote and published much. In 1872, she issued a book, a story for young people. She wrote a number of poems, essays and sketches over the pen-name "Margaret Frances." In all her work on reform, she used her own name in full.

She died in California, April 1910.

== Selected works ==
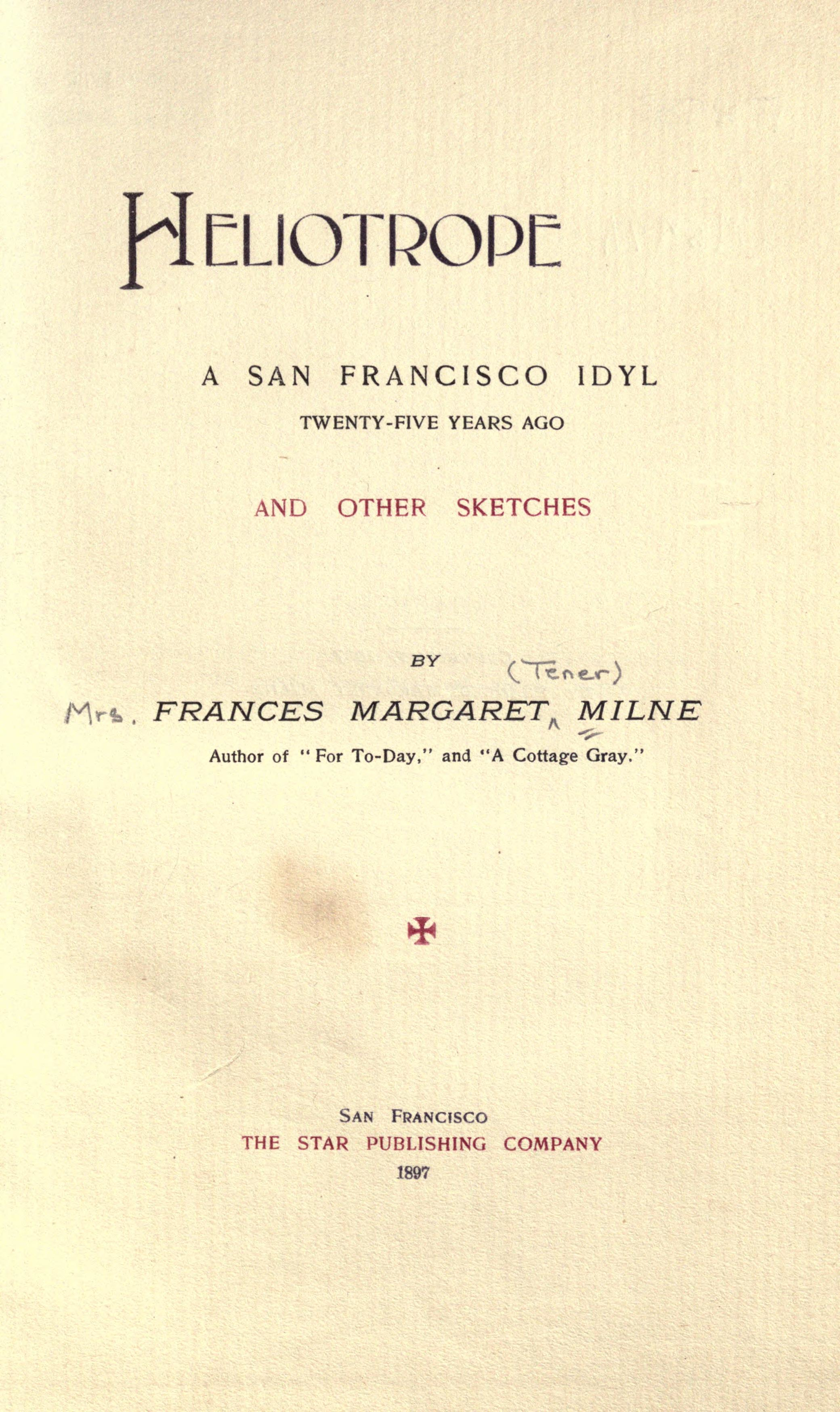
Heliotrope

- For to-day : poems (1893)
- A cottage gray and other poems (1895)
- Heliotrope (1897)
- Our little roman. verses of childhood. (1902)
- Passing of the village. (1902)
