= Pictures from Italy =

1846 book by Charles Dickens

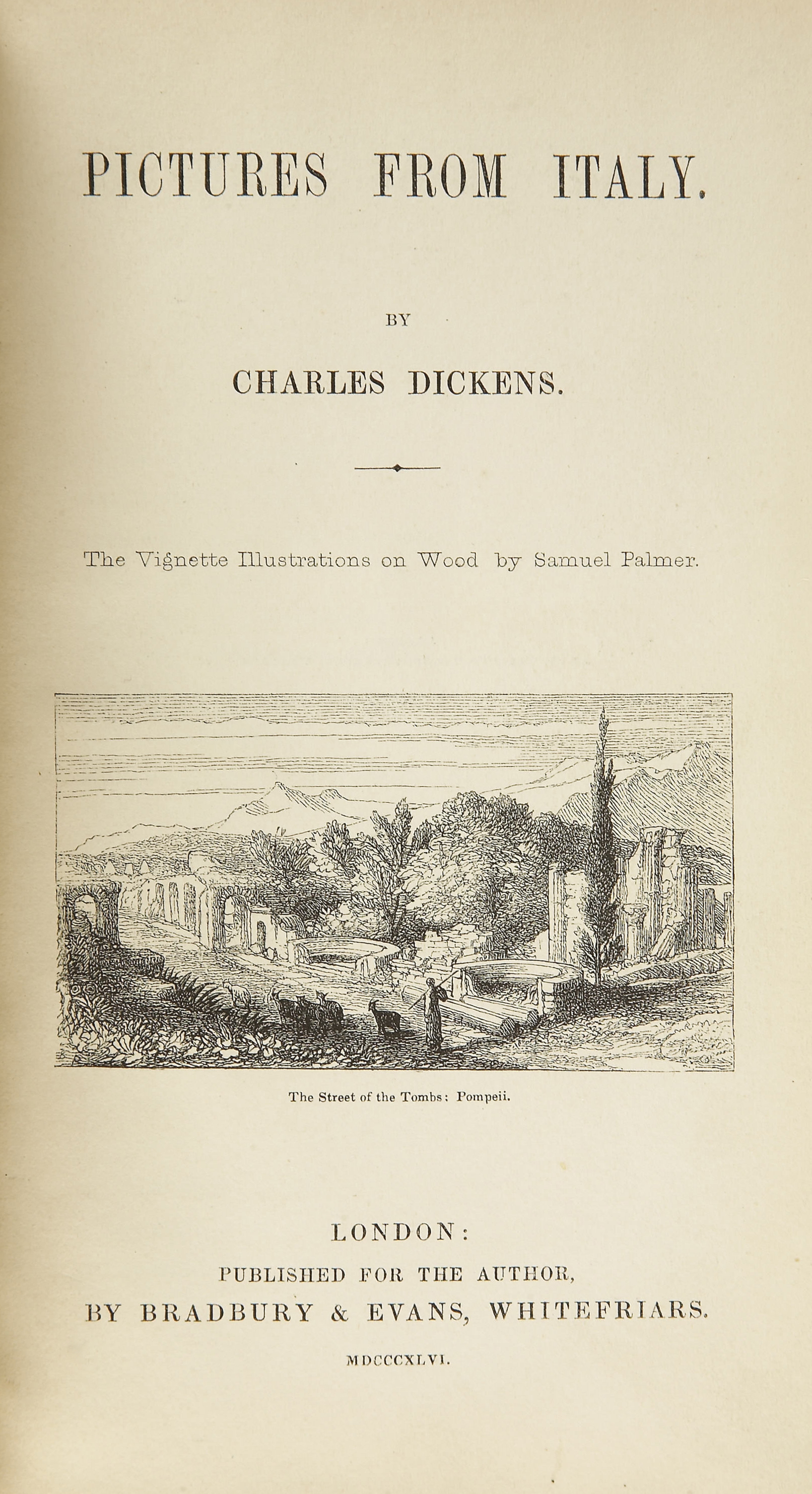
- Title page, first edition of 1846
- Author: Charles Dickens
- Illustrator: Samuel Palmer
- Language: English
- Genre: Nonfiction; Travelogue
- Publisher: London: Bradbury & Evans
- Publication date: 1846
- Publication place: England
- Media type: Print (Hardback, and Paperback)
- Preceded by: The Battle of Life
- Followed by: Dombey and Son

Pictures from Italy is a travelogue by Charles Dickens, written in 1846. The book reveals the concerns of its author as he presents, according to Kate Flint, the country "like a chaotic magic-lantern show, fascinated both by the spectacle it offers, and by himself as spectator".
