= Agnes Grey =

1847 novel by Anne Brontë

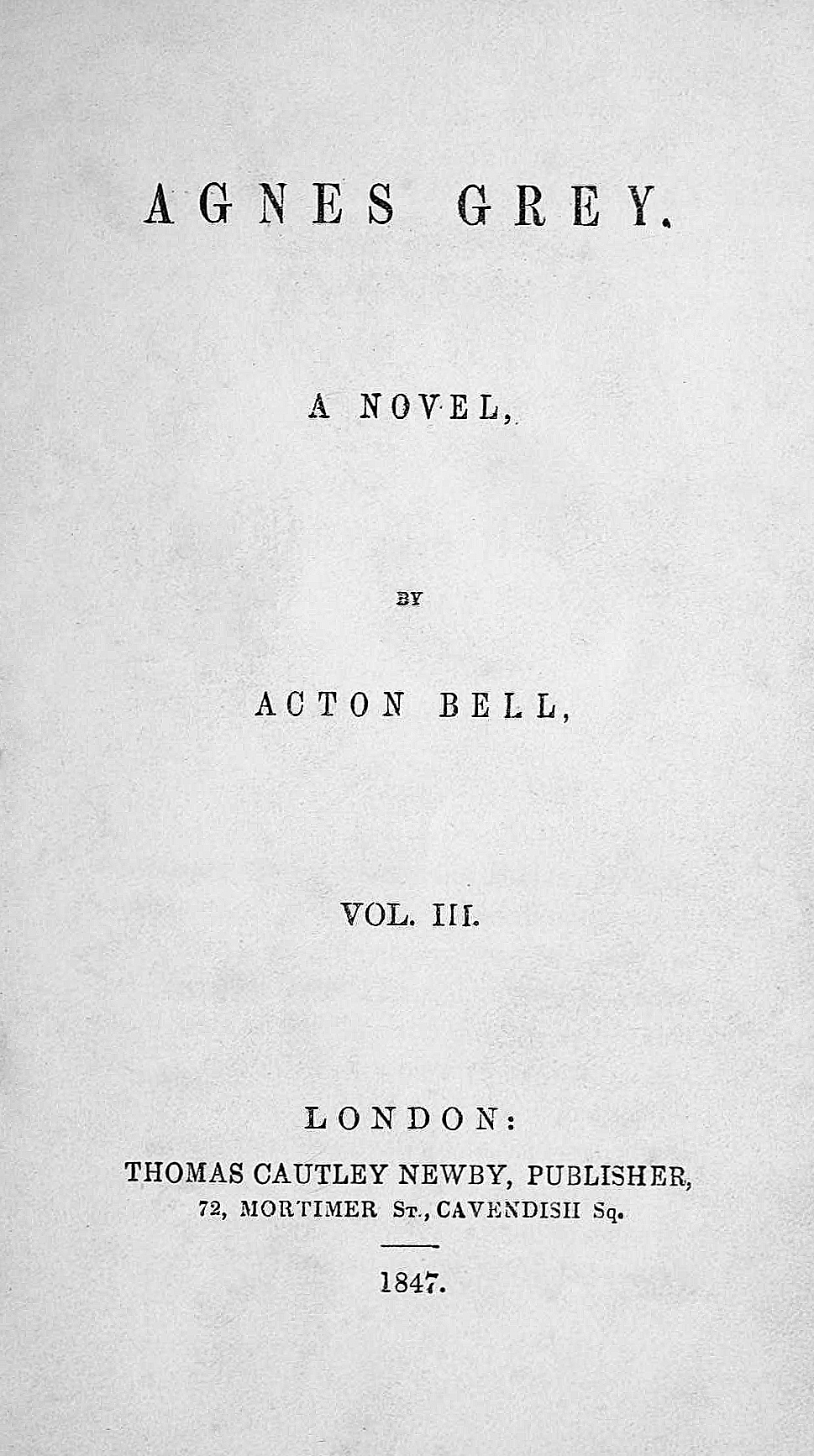
- Title page of the first edition, 1847. Wuthering Heights by Emily Brontë took up the first two volumes of the edition.
- Author: Anne Brontë
- Language: English
- Genre: Romance novel
- Set in: Northern England, mid-19th century
- Publisher: Thomas Cautley Newby
- Publication date: 24 November 1847
- Publication place: United Kingdom
- Media type: Print: hardback octavo
- Dewey Decimal: 823.8
- LC Class: PR4162 .A54
- Followed by: The Tenant of Wildfell Hall

Agnes Grey, A Novel is the first novel by English author Anne Brontë (writing under the pen name of "Acton Bell"), first published in December 1847, and republished in a second edition in 1850. The novel follows Agnes Grey, a governess, as she works within families of the English gentry. Scholarship and comments by Anne's sister Charlotte Brontë suggest the novel is largely based on Anne Brontë's own experiences as a governess for five years. Like her sister Charlotte's 1847 novel Jane Eyre, it addresses what the precarious position of governess entailed and how it affected a young woman.

The choice of central character allows Anne to deal with issues of oppression, abuse of women and governesses, isolation, and ideas of empathy. An additional theme is the fair treatment of animals. Agnes Grey also mimics some of the stylistic approaches of a bildungsroman, employing ideas of personal growth and coming of age.

The Irish novelist George Moore praised Agnes Grey as "the most perfect prose narrative in English letters," and went so far as to compare Anne's prose to that of Jane Austen. Modern critics have made more subdued claims admiring Agnes Grey with a less overt praise of Brontë's work than Moore.

== Background and publication ==
The genesis of Agnes Grey was attributed by Edward Chitham to the reflections on life found in Anne's diary of 31 July 1845.

It is likely that Anne was the first of the Brontë sisters to write a work of prose for publication, although Agnes Grey, Wuthering Heights, and Jane Eyre were all published within the same year: 1847. Anne's novel was eventually published by Thomas Newby in a triple-volume format: Emily's Wuthering Heights made up the first two volumes (by virtue of it being the longer), while Agnes Grey made up the third.

The original edition of Agnes Grey, published in 1847, had numerous orthographic, punctuation, and other issues attributed to neglect by the publisher Newby. However, the second edition, published in 1850, had many changes after the careful editing of Charlotte Brontë.

== Plot ==
Agnes Grey is the daughter of Mr Grey, a minister of modest means, and Mrs Grey, a woman who left her wealthy family and married purely out of love. Mr Grey tries to increase the family's financial standing, but the merchant to whom he entrusts his money dies in a shipwreck, and the lost investment plunges the family into debt.

Agnes, her sister Mary, and their mother all try to keep expenses low and bring in extra money, but Agnes is frustrated that everyone treats her like a child. To prove herself and to earn money, she is determined to get a position as a governess. Eventually, she obtains a recommendation from a well-placed acquaintance, is offered a position, and secures her parents' permission. With some misgivings, she travels to Wellwood house to work for the Bloomfield family.

The Bloomfields are rich and much crueller than Agnes had expected. Mrs Bloomfield spoils her children while Mr Bloomfield constantly finds fault with Agnes's work. The Bloomfield children are wild and unmanageable, yet Agnes is blamed for their behaviour despite having no real authority over them and is even required to address them formally as "Miss" and "Mister". Tom, the eldest, is especially cruel, delighting in tormenting smaller animals and showing no regard for discipline. His younger sisters, though less overtly vicious, are equally disobedient, going out of their way to defy Agnes's instructions and undermine her efforts. In less than a year, Agnes is relieved of her position, since Mrs Bloomfield thinks that her children are not learning quickly enough. Agnes returns home.

She then begs her mother to help her find a new situation. Agnes advertises and is given a position in an even wealthier family, the Murrays. The two boys, John and Charles, are both sent to school soon after her arrival, but the girls Rosalie and Matilda remain her charges. Matilda is a tomboy and Rosalie is a flirt. Both girls are selfish and sometimes unpleasant, and although Agnes's position is slightly better than it was at Wellwood house, she is frequently ignored or used in the girls' schemes.

Agnes begins to visit Nancy Brown, an old woman with poor eyesight who needs help reading the Bible; there, Agnes meets the new curate, Mr Edward Weston. The next day while on a walk Agnes is surprised by Mr Weston, who picks some wild primroses for her. Agnes later saves one of the flowers in her Bible. She learns that his mother has died not long ago. This new friendship is noticed by Rosalie Murray, who has now entered into society and is a favourite with nearly all suitors in the county.

Rosalie becomes engaged to Sir Thomas Ashby, a wealthy baronet from Ashby Park. She tells Agnes, but makes her promise to keep silent, as she is still going to flirt with other men before she is married. One day, she and Agnes go on a walk and meet Mr Weston. Rosalie begins to flirt with him, much to Agnes's chagrin.

Agnes receives a note from her sister Mary, who is now married to Mr Richardson, a parson of a rectory near their home. Mary warns that their father is dying and begs Agnes to come. Agnes arrives too late to see her father alive. After his funeral, Agnes opens a small school with her mother, leaving the Murrays.

She receives a letter from Rosalie, who asks Agnes to come for a visit. Agnes is shocked by the change in Rosalie from a merry girl to an unhappy young woman. Rosalie confides that she despises Sir Thomas Ashby (and her mother-in-law), and claims he only left London because he was jealous of all the gentlemen she was attracting. Agnes also hears that Mr Weston has left the area, and she grieves, believing she will not be able to see him again.

Agnes leaves Ashby Park and returns home. Several months after she arrives, she goes for a walk on the sea shore and encounters Mr Weston, who had been looking for her since he moved to the nearby parsonage.

He is introduced to Agnes's mother, and they forge a bond. Agnes finds her attraction to him growing, and she accepts his proposal of marriage. In the end, Agnes is happy as Edward Weston's wife, and the couple have three children.

== Characters ==
- Agnes Grey—Main protagonist and narrator of the story. She is the younger daughter of Richard Grey, and is determined to take care of herself, to save trouble for her mother.
- Edward Weston—A country parson whom Agnes meets while visiting the poor near the Murray's estate. He and Agnes fall in love, but Agnes believes that he loves the beautiful Rosalie Murray. In the end, he and Agnes marry.
- Richard Grey—Agnes’ father, a poor parson who loses his patrimony in a disastrous speculation which ruined his health.
- Alice Grey—Agnes’ mother, a lady who left her family to marry Richard Grey, and who opens a school with Agnes after her husband's death.
- Mary Grey—Agnes’ sister who later marries a parson, Mr Richardson.
- Mrs Bloomfield—Mistress of Wellwood. Agnes’ first employer, she is convinced that her incorrigible children are really very good, and that Agnes is a bad example to them.
- Mr Bloomfield—Master of Wellwood. He is convinced that Agnes is not competent, and as a result, often watches her, scolding her for the misbehavior of the children, which she could not prevent.
- Matilda Murray—The younger daughter of the Murray family. She is a tom-boy who has learned to swear from her father and the outdoors servant men. She does not want to learn anything, but is forced to by Agnes’ being there. She is very fond of horses and wants more than anything to go hunting with her father.
- Rosalie Ashby (formerly Rosalie Murray)—The oldest Murray child, who makes Agnes a sort of confidant. She is a selfish girl who flirts with any man she comes in contact with. She is jealous of Agnes because of Edward Weston, even though she told Agnes that Mr Weston was an “ugly blockhead.” She marries Sir Thomas Ashby because he is rich and has a title, and she adores Ashby Park. She later regrets her marriage, and becomes closer to Agnes.
- John Murray—Older of the two Murray boys. He is sent to school about a year after Agnes comes to be his family's governess.
- Charles Murray—The younger of the two Murray boys. He is sent to school about two years after Agnes comes to the Murray household.
- Mr Murray—Agnes's second employer. He is often out hunting, and has taught his daughter, Matilda to swear.
- Mrs Murray—Agnes's second employer's wife. She is a fashionable, showy woman who wants her daughters to marry well. Matilda drives her crazy because of her tom-boy ways. She convinces Rosalie that Lord Ashby's character is not as bad as is reported.
- Sir Thomas Ashby—Rosalie's husband. He has a terrible character, which Rosalie knows about when she marries him. While he is always talking about different women, he gets furious and jealous if Rosalie mentions one other man.
- Mr Hatfield—Rector near the Murray's estate. He has an attraction to Rosalie because of her fortune, and she flirts with him for a while. When he proposes, she laughs at him, and he ends up marrying a rich older woman.
- Nancy Brown—An older woman whom Agnes befriends. In her house, Agnes and Mr Weston meet. She is a great admirer of Mr Weston's.
- Tom Bloomfield—The oldest Bloomfield child. He is cruel to animals, something Agnes tries to stop, but fails as he is encouraged by his parents and his uncle.
- Mr Richardson—A middle-aged parson. He marries Mary Grey.

== Style ==
Agnes Grey has a "perfect" and simple prose style which moves forward gently but does not produce a sense of monotony. George Moore suggested that it conveyed a style with "all the qualities of Jane Austen and other qualities". Her style is considered both witty and apt for subtlety and irony.

Stevie Davies points to the intellectual wit behind the text:

The genuineness of texture and dialogue in Agnes Grey is the product of minute observations, focused by a fine authorial irony and delicate power of understatement.

== Genre ==
Cates Baldridge describes Agnes Grey as a novel which "takes great pains to announce itself as a bildungsroman" but in fact never allows its character to grow up or transform for ideological reasons. Baldridge says the early emphasis on Agnes' bourgeois upbringing allows the reader to form the supposition that the transformative bourgeois class will develop an ideal person of virtue. However, Agnes stalls in her development because of the corrupted nature of the household in which she is employed. As a result, she becomes a static member of the bourgeois, ambivalent to the Victorian value of moral transformation in virtue.

=== Autobiographical novel ===
Agnes Grey is also an autobiographical novel with strong parallels between its events and Anne's own life as a governess; indeed, according to Charlotte Brontë, the story of Agnes largely stemmed from Anne's own experiences as a governess. Like Agnes, "dear, gentle" Anne was the youngest child of a poor clergyman. In April 1839, she took up a position as a governess with the Ingham family of Blake Hall, Mirfield, in Yorkshire, about 20 miles away from Haworth, to whom the Bloomfields bear some resemblance. One of the more memorable scenes from the novel, in which Agnes kills a group of birds to save them from being tortured by Tom Bloomfield, was taken from an actual incident. In December 1839, Anne, like Agnes, was dismissed.

Anne found a post at Thorp Green, Little Ouseburn, near York, around 70 miles away, just as Agnes' second position is further from home, with older pupils—Lydia Robinson, 15. Elizabeth, 13, and Mary, 12. There was also a son, Edmund, who was eight when Anne began working there in the spring of 1840. Anne's brother Branwell became his tutor in January 1843. The fictional Murrays of Horton Lodge echo the Robinsons; like the "dashing" Mrs Murray, who "certainly required neither rouge nor padding to add to her charms", Mrs Lydia Robinson was a handsome woman of 40 when Anne came to Thorp Green.

Stevie Davies remarks that Agnes Grey could be called a "Protestant spiritual autobiography". First, the book retains a sober tone, and Agnes displays a very strong Puritan personality reflected in her name. Agnes is derived from the Greek for chaste, hagne, and Grey commonly is associated with "Quakers and quietists to express radical dissociation from gaudy worldiness".

F. B. Pinion is of the opinion that Agnes Grey "is almost certainly a fictionalized adaptation of Passages in the Life of an Individual". However, he also points to several sections that are "wholly fictitious":

the opening and Agnes's return home after failure in her first post; the love story which develops during her second period as a governess; the marriage and disillusionment of Rosalie Murray; and, above all, the happy ending.

== Themes ==
=== Social instruction ===
Throughout Agnes Grey, Agnes is able to return to her mother for instruction when the rest of her life becomes rough. F. B. Pinion identifies this impulse to return home with a desire in Anne to provide instruction for society. Pinion quotes Anne's belief that "All good histories contain instruction" when he makes this argument. He says that Anne felt that she could "Reveal life as it is...[so that] right and wrong will be clear in a discerning reader without sermonizing." Her discussion of oppression of governesses, and in turn women, can be understood from this perspective.

=== Oppression ===
Events representative of cruel treatment of governesses and of women recur throughout Agnes Grey. Additionally, Brontë depicts scenes of cruelty towards animals, as well as degrading treatment of Agnes. Parallels have been drawn between the oppression of these two groups—animals and females—that are "beneath" the upper class human male. To Anne, the treatment of animals reflected on the character of the person. This theme of oppression provided social commentary, likely based on Anne's experiences. Twenty years after its publication Lady Amberly commented that "I should like to give it to every family with a governess and shall read it through again when I have a governess to remind me to be human."

=== Animals ===
Beyond the treatment of animals, Anne carefully describes the actions and expressions of animals. Stevie Davies observes that this acuity of examination along with the moral reflection on the treatment of animals suggests that, for Anne, "animals are fellow beings with an ethical claim on human protection."

=== Empathy ===
Agnes tries to impart to her charges the ability to empathise with others. This is especially evident in her conversations with Rosalie Murray, whose careless treatment of the men who love her upsets Agnes.

=== Isolation ===
Maria H. Frawley notes that Agnes is isolated from a young age. She comes from a "rural heritage" and her mother brings up her sister and herself away from society. Once Agnes has become a governess, she becomes more isolated by the large distance from her family and further alienation by her employers. Agnes does not resist the isolation, but instead uses the opportunity for self-study and personal development.

== Critical reception ==
Agnes Grey was popular during what remained of Anne Brontë's life despite the belief of many critics at the time that the novel was marred by "coarseness" and "vulgarity," but it lost some of its popularity afterwards because of its perceived moralising. However, in the 20th century, there was an increase in examination by scholars of Agnes Grey and of Anne Brontë. In Conversation in Ebury Street, the Irish novelist George Moore provided a commonly cited example of these newer reviews, overtly praising the style of the novel. F. B. Pinion agreed to a large extent that Agnes Grey was a masterwork. However, Pinion felt that Moore's examination of the piece was a little extreme and that his "preoccupation with style must have blinded him to the persistence of her moral purpose" of Agnes Grey.
