= Dmitry Grigorovich (writer) =

Russian writer (1822–1900)

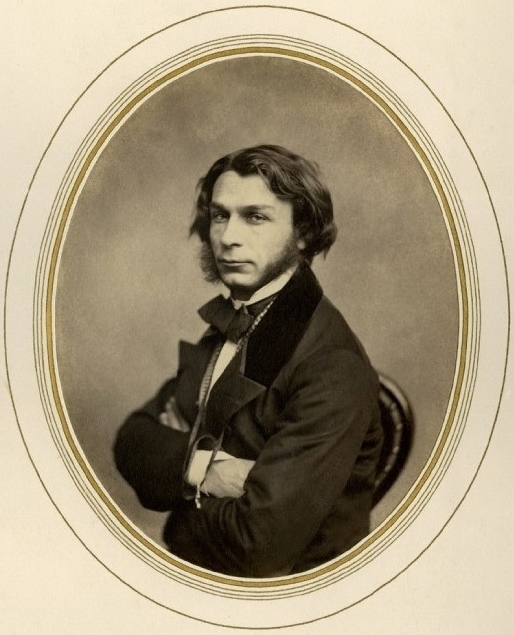
- Portrait by Sergey Lvovich Levitsky, 1856
- Born: 31 March 1822; Simbirsk, Russia
- Died: 3 January 1900 (aged 77); Saint Petersburg, Russia
- Education: Military engineering-technical university
- Writing career
- Period: 1840s–1890s
- Genres: Fiction, criticism, travel writing
- Subject: Social issues
- Notable work: The Village • Anton Goremyka

Dmitry Vasilyevich Grigorovich (Russian: Дми́трий Васи́льевич Григоро́вич) (31 March [O.S. 19 March] 1822 – 3 January 1900 [O.S. 22 December 1899]) was a Russian writer, best known for his first two novels, The Village and Anton Goremyka. He was lauded as the first author to have realistically portrayed the life of the Russian rural community and openly condemn the system of serfdom.

== Biography ==
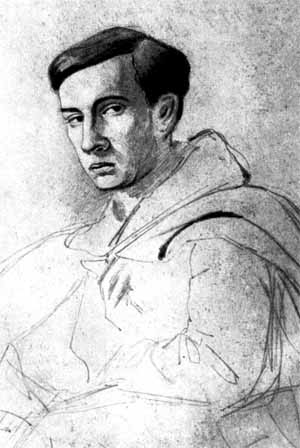
Self-portrait of the young Grigorovich.

Dmitry Grigorovich was born in Simbirsk to a family of the landed gentry. His Russian father was a retired hussar officer, his French mother, Cydonia de Varmont, was a daughter of a royalist who perished on guillotine in the times of the Reign of Terror. Having lost his father early in his life, Dmitry was brought up by his mother and grandmother, the two women who hardly spoke anything but French. Up until the age of eight the boy had serious difficulties with his Russian. "I was taking my lessons of Russian from servants, local peasants but mostly from my father's old kammerdiener Nikolai... For hours on end was he waiting for the moment I'd be let out to play and then he'd grab me by the hand and walk me through fields and groves, telling fairytales and all kinds of adventure stories. Cast in coldness of my lonely childhood, I was thawing only when having these walks with Nikolai," Grigorovich remembered later.

In 1832 Grigorovich entered a German gymnasium, then was moved to the French Monighetty boarding school in Moscow. In 1835 he enrolled at the Nikolayevsky Engineering Institute, where he made friends with his fellow student Fyodor Dostoyevsky who got him interested in literature. In 1840 Grigorovich quit the institute after the severe punishment he'd received for failing to formally greet the Grand Duke Mikhail Pavlovich, as the latter was passing by. He joined the Imperial Academy of Arts where Taras Shevchenko was his close friend. One of his first literary acquaintances was Nikolay Nekrasov whom he met while studying at the Academy studios.

=== Career ===
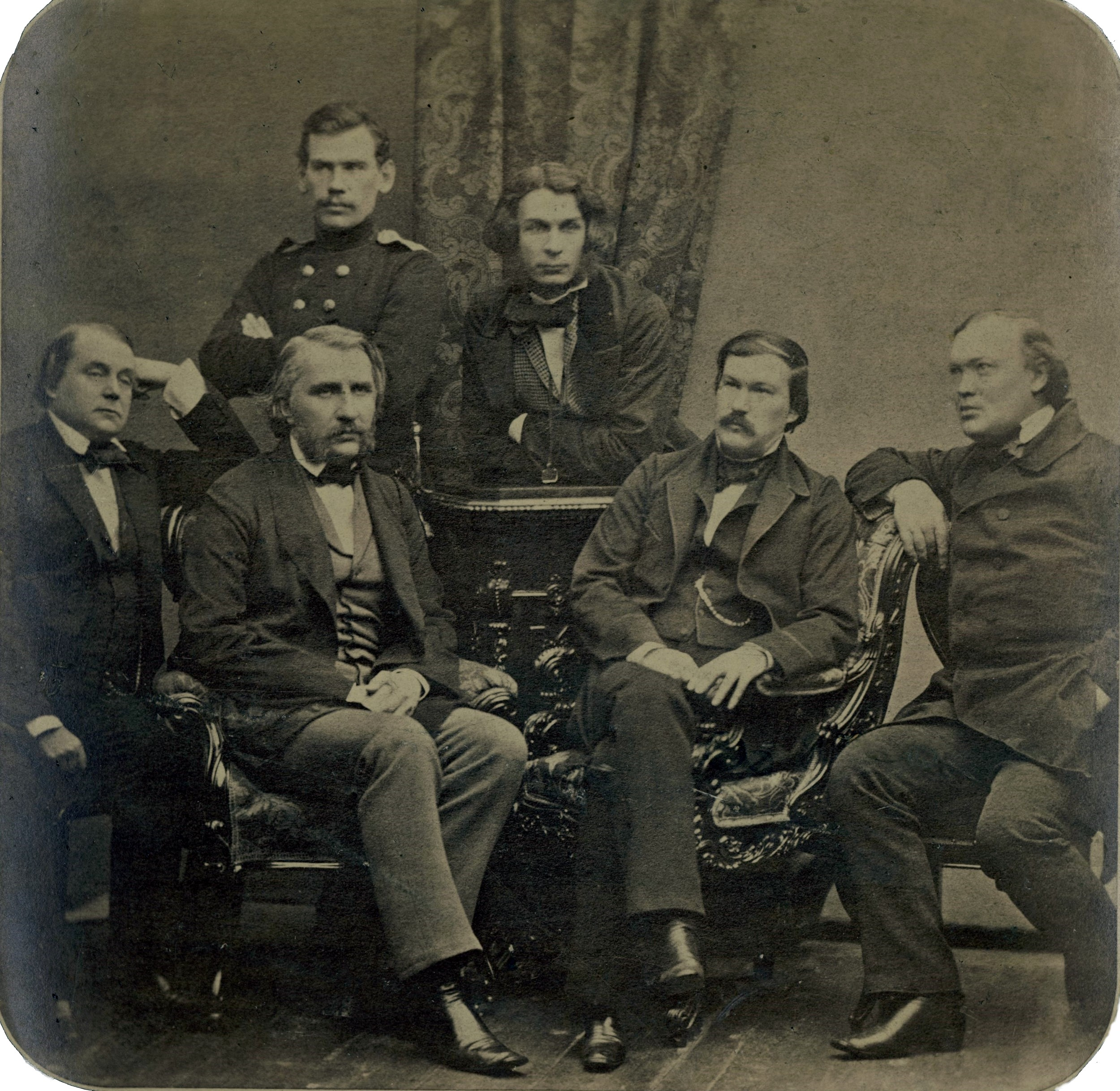
Contributors to Sovremennik: Grigorovich (top center) next to Leo Tolstoy, Bottom row: (from left) Goncharov, Turgenev, Druzhinin, and Ostrovsky. Photograph by Sergey Levitsky, 1856.

While working at the Academy of Arts' chancellery, Grigorovich joined the close circle of actors, writers and scriptwriters. Soon he started writing himself, and made several translations of French vaudevilles (The Inheritance, Champaigne and Opium, both 1843) into Russian. Nekrasov noticed his first published original short stories, "Theatre Carriage" (1844) and "A Doggie" (1845), both bearing strong Gogol influence, and invited him to take part in the almanac The Physiology of Saint Petersburg he was working upon at the time. Grigorovich's contribution to it, a detailed study of the life of the travelling musicians of the city called St. Petersburg Organ Grinders (1845), was praised by the influential critic Vissarion Belinsky, to whom Nekrasov soon introduced him personally.

In the mid-1840s, Grigorovich, now a journalist, specializing in sketches for Literaturnaya Gazeta and theatre feuilletons for Severnaya Ptchela, renewed his friendship with Dostoyevsky who in 1846 read to him his first novel Poor Folk. Greatly impressed, Grigorovich took the manuscript to Nekrasov, who promptly published it.

Also in 1846, Andrey Krayevsky's Otechestvennye Zapiski (Nekrasov, who had received the manuscript first, somehow gave it a miss and then forgot all about it) published Grigorovich's short novel The Village. Influenced by Dickens's Oliver Twist but based on a real life story of a peasant woman (from the village which belonged to his mother) who'd been forcefully married and then beaten by her husband to death, the novel became one of the first in Russian literature to strongly condemn the system of serfdom and "the first attempt in the history of our literature to get closer to real people's life," according to Ivan Turgenev.

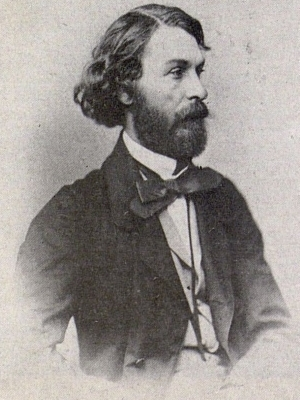
Dmitry Grigorovich in the late 1850s; photograph by Andrey Denyer

Grigorovich's second short novel, Anton Goremyka ('Luckless Anton', 1847), promptly published this time by Sovremennik, made the author famous. "Not a single Russian novel has yet brought upon me such an impression of horrible, damning doom," Belinsky confided in a letter to critic Vasily Botkin. The realistic treatment of the life of Russian peasants in these two novels was praised by fellow writers Mikhail Saltykov-Shchedrin and Leo Tolstoy among others, and had a considerable impact on the writing of that period. "There'd be not a single educated man in those times and in the years to come who'd read Luckless Anton without tears of passion and hatred, damning horrors of serfdom," wrote Pyotr Kropotkin. In a letter dated 25th October 1891, Tolstoy referred to Grigorovich's Anton Goremka (referred to by the letter's translator as, Hapless Anton) as having exerted a "very great" literary influence on him in his early years. Anton Goremyka was included into the list of the "most dangerous publications of the year," alongside articles by Belinsky and Alexander Hertzen, by the Special Literature and Publishing Committee.

In the late 1840 and early 1850s, Grigorovich's fame started to wane. Partly, it got eclipsed by the publication of Ivan Turgenev's A Sportsman's Sketches, but also, his own works of the so-called 'seven years of reaction', 1848-1855 period were not quite up to the standard set by his first two masterpieces. Highlighting the brighter sides of the life of the Russian rural community of the time, they were closer to liberal doctrines than to the radical views of Nikolai Chernyshevsky who was gaining more and more influence in Sovremennik. Several satirical short stories of this period ("Adventures of Nakatov", "Short Term Wealth", "Svistulkin") could hardly be called in any way subversive. The short novel Four Seasons (1849) has been described as "a kind of simplistic Russian low-life idyll" by the author himself. "Things are as bad as they've never been. What with censorship being now so fierce, whatever I'd choose to publish might get me into trouble," Grigorovich complained in an 1850 letter.

Grigorovich's epic, sprawling novel Cart-Tracks (Prosyolochnye Dorogi, 1852) with its gallery of social parasites came under criticism for being overblown and derivative, Gogol's Dead Souls considered the obvious point of reference. Better received was his The Fishermen (Rybaki, 1853) novel, one of the earliest works of Russian literature pointing at the emergence of kulak (rich, exploitative peasant) in the Russian rural environment. Hertzen in his detailed review praised the way the author managed to get rid of his early influences but deplored what he thought was the lack of one strong, positive character. The Fishermen, according to Hertzen, "brought us first signs that Russian society started to recognize an important social force in its [common] people." The emerging proletariat, though, drew little sympathy from the author. "The decline of morality in the Russian village is often caused by [vices of] the factory way of life," he opined.

Another novel dealing with the conflict between Russian serfs and their owners, The Settlers (Pereselentsy, 1855), was reviewed positively by Nikolai Chernyshevsky, who still refused to see (what he termed) 'philanthropy' as providing the means for mending profound social schisms. Critics of all camps, though, praised Grigorovich's pictures of nature, the result of his early fascination with fine arts; numerous lyrical extracts from his books have made their way into school textbooks. Both The Fishermen and The Settlers strengthened Grigorovich's reputation and Nekrasov has got him to sign a special contract making sure he (alongside Ivan Turgenev, Alexander Ostrovsky and Leo Tolstoy) would from then on write for Sovremennik exclusively.

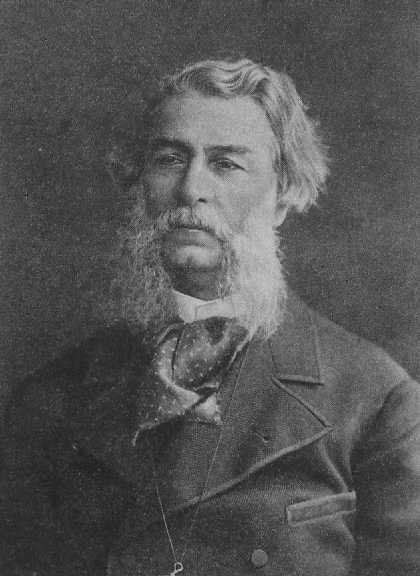
Dmitry Grigorovich in the 1880s

In the mid-1850s, as the rift between Socialist radicals and liberals in the Russian literature was becoming more and more pronounced, Grigorovich made a strong neutral stand and attempted to make Nekrasov see that his way of "quarrelling with other journals" has been causing harm to both himself and Sovremennik, as Grigorovich saw it. In keeping with this spirit of peace and compromise was his next small novel Ploughman (Pakhar, 1856), either a paean to the "strength of the Russian folk spirit," or a comment on a man of the land's utter endurance, depending upon a viewpoint. School of Hospitality (Shkola gostepriimstva, 1855), written under the influence of Alexander Druzhinin (and, allegedly, not without his direct participation), was in effect a swipe at Chernyshevsky, but the latter refused to be provoked and personal relations between the two men never soured, even if their ideological differences now were irreconcilable. Several years later, as Druzhinin and his fellow proponents of the 'arts for arts' sake' doctrine instigated a dispute along the lines of "free-thinking Pushkin versus overcritical Gogol," Grigorovich backed the Chernyshevsky-led Sovremennik group, despite being friends with Druzhinin.

Notes on Modern Ways (Otcherki sovremennykh nravov, 1857), published in Sovremennik, satirized Russian bureaucracy, but by this time signs of the forthcoming crisis have already been obvious. "Never before had I such doubts about myself, there are times when I feel totally downtrodden," he confessed in an 1855 letter to Druzhinin.

In 1858, Grigorovich accepted the Russian Navy Ministry's invitation to make a round-Europe voyage on warship Retvizan and later described it in The Ship Retvizan (1858–1863). Back in Russia, Grigorovich started his own Popular Readings project but this 10-book series failed to make an impact. Grigorovich was planning to comment on the demolition of serfdom in Two Generals (Dva Generala, 1864), but this novel, recounting the story of two generations of landowners, remained unfinished. In the mid-1860s he stopped writing altogether to concentrate on studying painting and collecting items of fine arts. "Painting has always interested me more than literature," admitted Grigorovich, whom many specialists considered a scholar in this field.

=== Later life ===
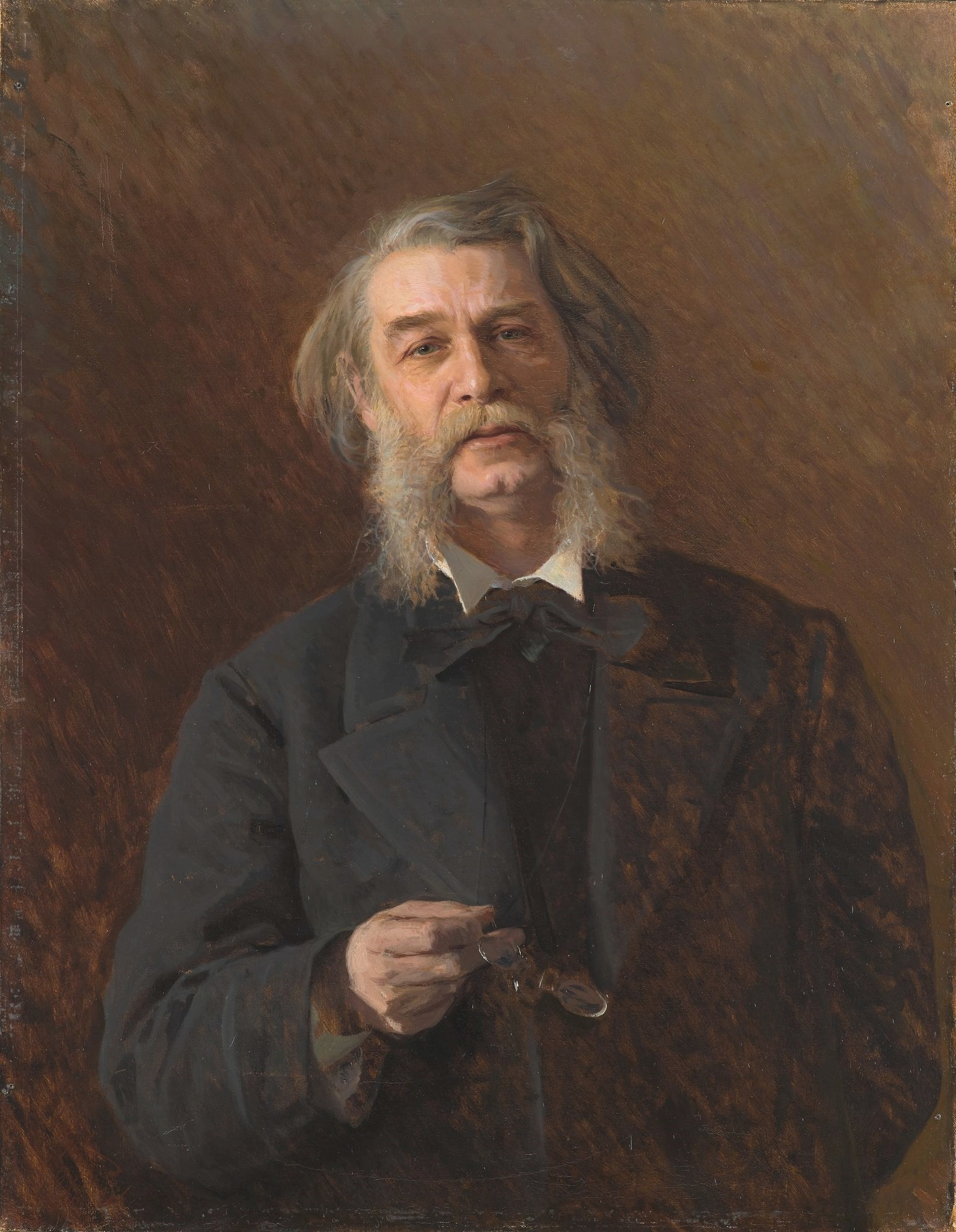
Portrait of Grigorovich by Ivan Kramskoy, 1876

In 1862 Grigorovich travelled to London to study the English fine arts at the 1862 International Exhibition, as well as several other galleries. In 1863 Russky Vestnik published an account of his studies, Paintings by English Artists at the 1862 London Exhibitions, by far the most comprehensive analysis of British painting to have appeared in the Russian press. He especially liked the works of William Holman Hunt.

In 1864 Grigorovich was elected the Secretary of the Russian Society for Encouraging Artists and held this post for twenty years, doing much to improve the art education throughout the country. The Museum of Art History he organized at the Society was credited with being one of the best in Europe of its kind. At the Society's School of Drawing Grigorovich gathered the best teachers from all over Russia, and made sure exhibitions and contests were being held regularly, with winners receiving grants from the Society. Grigorovich was the first to discover and support the soon-to-become famous painters Fyodor Vasilyev and Ilya Repin. His achievements as the head of the Society Grigorovich earned him the status of the Actual State Councilor and a lifetime pension.

In 1883 Grigorovich the writer made an unexpected comeback with the "Gutta-Percha Boy" (Guttaperchevy Maltchik) which was unanimously hailed as the author's 'little masterpiece'. The story of a teenage circus virtuoso's death made its way into the Russian classic children's reading lists and was adapted for the big screen twice, in 1915 and 1957. Also in 1883 Grigorovich translated Prosper Mérimée's "Le Vase Etrusque" into Russian, his version of it regarded in retrospect as unsurpassed. In 1885 his satirical novel Acrobats of Charity (Akrobaty blagotvoritelnosti) came out and caused much debate. Its title became a popular token phrase (used, notably, by Lenin in one of his 1901 works) and the play The Suede People based on this short story was produced at the Moscow Art Theatre by Konstantin Stanislavsky.

In 1886, Grigorovich famously encouraged young Anton Chekhov, telling him in a letter that he had a gift and should approach literature with more seriousness. "Your letter... struck me like a flash of lightning. I almost burst into tears, I was overwhelmed, and now I feel it left a deep mark on my soul," Chekhov replied. In his Literary Memoirs (1892–1993), Grigorovich created a vast panorama of the Russian 1840s–1850s literary scene and (while carefully avoiding political issues) left vivid portraits of the people he knew well, like Ivan Turgenev, Vasily Botkin and Leo Tolstoy.

Dmitry Vasilyevich Grigorovich died in Saint Petersburg on January 3, 1900. He is interred in Volkovo Cemetery.

== Legacy ==
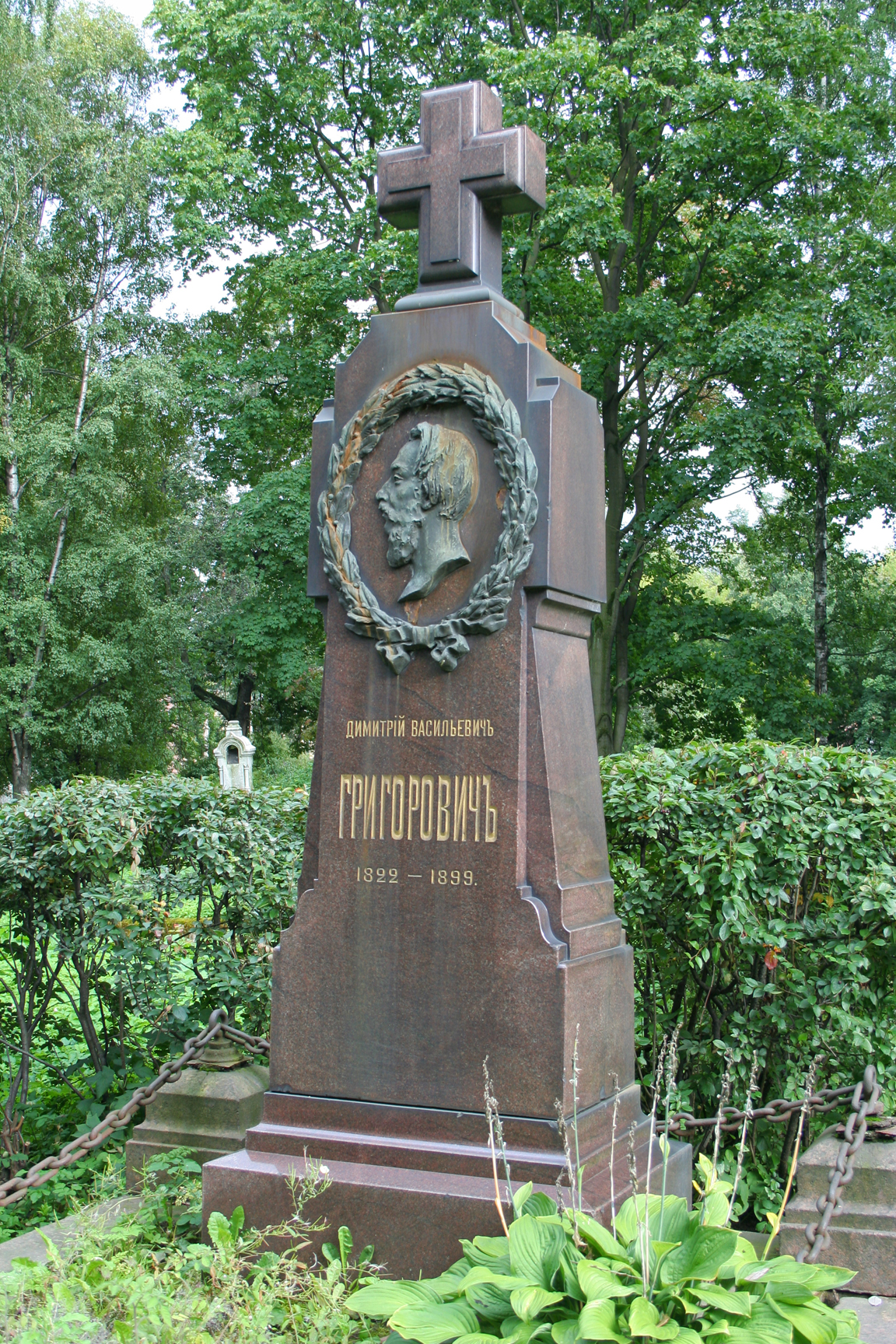
Grigorovich's grave. Volkovo Cemetery, Saint Petersburg

Dmitry Grigorovich is generally regarded as the first writer to have shown the real life of the Russian rural community in its full detail, following the tradition of the natural school movement to which he in the 1840s belonged. His first two short novels, The Village and Anton Goremyka, are seen as precursors for several important works by Ivan Turgenev, Leo Tolstoy and Nikolai Leskov. As harsh critic of serfdom, he's been linked to the line of Radishchev, Griboyedov and Pushkin.

Numerous writers, critics and political activists, Alexander Hertzen among them, noted the impact that his second novel Anton Goremyka have had upon the development of social consciousness in Russia. It greatly influenced the new, politically-minded generation of Russian intelligentsia of the mid-19th century and in many ways helped launch the early socialist movement in the country. Saltykov-Shchedrin called the first two books by Grigorovich "a springtime rain which invigorated Russian literary soil." Both made the Russian educated society aware for the first time of the plight of muzhik, as a human being, not an abstraction, according to the famous satirist. Leo Tolstoy praised Grigorovich for having portrayed Russian peasants "with love, respect and something close to trepidation," writing of enormous impact his "vast, epic tapestries like Anton Goremyka have made."

According to Semyon Vengerov, Grigorovich's first two novels marked the peak of his whole career. "All of his later books were written with the same sympathy for the common man, but failed to excite," this literary historian argued. Some critics belonging to the Russian left (Vengerov included) made much of the fact that Grigorovich (as well as Turgenev) allegedly 'hated' Chernyshevsky; others considered his works deficient, for being not radical enough. Critics from all camps, though, admired Grigorovich for his fine, simple, yet colourful language and praised him as a master of 'natural landscape'. This gift, developed apparently as a result of his love for fine arts and painting, was quite extraordinary for someone who'd been brought up by two French women and up until the age of eight spoke hardly any Russian at all.

== English translations ==
- The Cruel City, (novel-1855/56), Cassell Publishing Company, 1891. from Google Books
- The Peasant, (short novel), from Russian Sketches, Smith Elder & Co, 1913. from Archive.org
- The Fishermen, (novel-1853), Stanley Paul and Co, 1916. from Archive.org
