= E. E. Brown =

American writer and painter

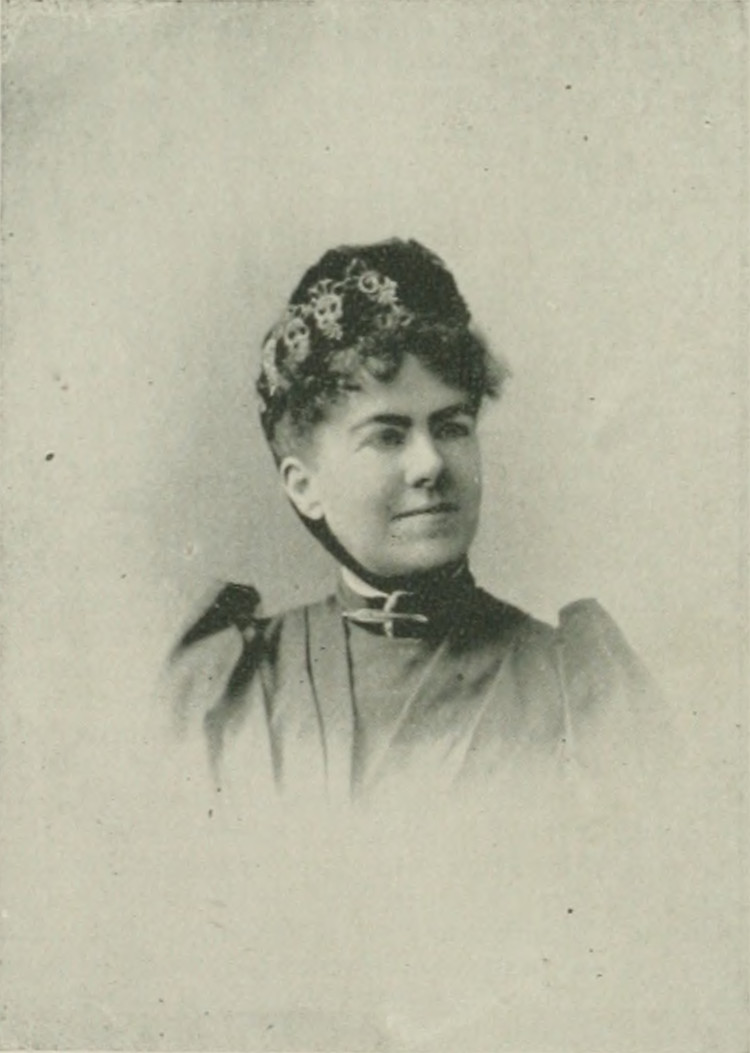
- Photo in A Woman of the Century
- Born: Emma Elizabeth Brown; October 18, 1847; Concord, New Hampshire, U.S.
- Died: March 24, 1937 (aged 89)
- Occupations: author; artist
- Writing career
- Pen name: B. E. E.; E. E. Brown
- Genres: prose; biographies; poetry

Emma Elizabeth Brown (October 18, 1847 – March 24, 1937), pen names B. E. E. and E. E. Brown, was an American author of prose, biographies, and poetry. She wrote for literary and religious magazines. Brown was also an artist. She exhibited watercolors in 1892.

== Early life and education ==
Emma Elizabeth Brown was born in Concord, New Hampshire, October 18, 1847. She was the daughter of John Frost and Elizabeth (Evans) Brown. Her father had no sons, his brother Henry never married, and, her grandfather Brown having been an only son, Emma was the last of her line to bear the family name. As stated by the late Henry Brown, who was a genealogist, this family of Brown in New England was of German origin, and the early spelling of the name was Braun.

Through her paternal grandmother, Susannah Frost Brown, Emma traced her descent from Edmund Frost, Ruling Elder of the church in Cambridge, Massachusetts. Elder Frost, said to have been son of John Frost, of Ipswich, England, came over in the ship Great Hope in 1635, and was made freeman at Cambridge, March 3, 1630. He died in July 1672. In his will, which was probated in October following, he left bequests to his widow Reana (his second wife), each of his eight children, something to the new college (Harvard) then building at Cambridge, and to George Alcock, a student.

Emma's father, John Frost Brown, for many years a bookseller in Concord, was an ardent lover of beauty, whether in nature or art. During her girlhood, as she took long outdoor tramps with him, he taught her to note the changing beauties of sky and land and sea, which in later years she was skillful in reproducing. During his busy life, he collected a large library of valuable books. He was a great reader himself, and he directed her reading, which dwelt mostly on outdoor themes and stories of golden deeds in ancient and modern history. This reading bore fruit in the many interesting volumes to which Emma's name was attached. Her mother, Elizabeth Evans, was also of English descent, but her family record shows more practical business men than scholars. She herself had great executive ability and an energetic temperament. Her parents were Artemas and Margaret (Sargent) Evans. The latter, Emma's grandmother, lived to be more than 100 years old, and when she was 92 had four sisters living who were over 90. Only two of the five, however, reached the century mark, and none of the later generation showed any striking longevity.

Though attending school, Brown also learnt at home, where her father would read to her and her siblings from his library. Her mother also inspired her and from both parents she received constant help and encouragement in her early efforts. Well-trained in the Concord schools, she was always a student at home and a keen observer as she travelled.

During her school-days she sent a poem to the Concord Monitor.

== Career ==
Brown produced contributions for various literary and religious magazines, including the Atlantic Monthly, The Aldine, Living Age, and others. Her only volume of poems was a brochure entitled A Hundred Years Ago (Boston, 1876). Six volumes of the "Spare Minute Series" were compiled, and five of the "Biographical Series" were of her writing. Her Sunday school books were From Night to Light (Boston, 1872), a story of the Babylonian captivity, and The Child Toilers of the Boston Streets (Boston, 1874). Her magazine stories — many under the pseudonym "B. E. E." — had a grace and tenderness. Her biographies of Washington, Grant, Garfield, and Oliver Wendell Holmes were in steady demand. Huldah, her book of patriotic verse, dedicated to a member of the Daughters of the American Revolution, was read with appreciation by lovers of graceful poetry.

The demand for her watercolors exceeded the supply. At her exhibition in 1892, the favored pictures were scenes at the Azores, where Brown had vacationed. In 1903, she sketched along the Massachusetts coast, while residing in Newton Highlands.

== Selected works ==
=== By B. E. E. ===
- From Night to Light, 1872

=== By E. E. Brown ===
- Life of Oliver Wendell Holmes, With a Portrait, 1884
- The Life and Public Services of James A. Garfield, 1881
- Life of Ulysses Simpson Grant, 1885
- Life of James Russell Lowell, 1887

=== By Emma E. Brown ===
- The Child Toilers of Boston Streets, With Twelve Drawings from Life, by Katherine Peirson, 1878
- Huldah: A Daughter of the Revolution, and Other Poems of American Patriotism, 1897
