= Johann Heinrich van Ess =

German Catholic theologian (1772–1847)

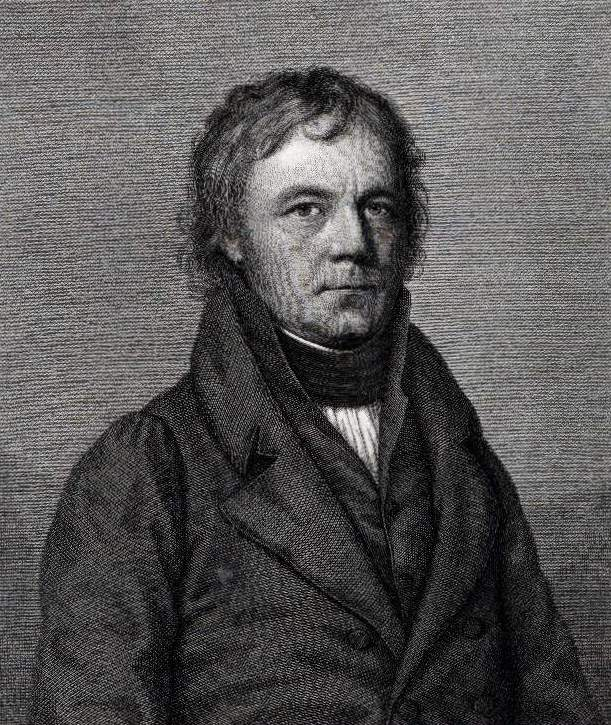
- Born: February 15, 1772; Warburg, Westphalia
- Died: October 13, 1847 (aged 75); Affolterbach, Odenwald
- Other names: Leander van Ess
- Occupation: Theologian
- Known for: translating the Bible into German from 1807 (publication of the New Testament) until 1836 (publication of the second part of the Old Testament)

Johann Heinrich van Ess (February 15, 1772 – October 13, 1847), was a German Catholic theologian, born at Warburg, Westphalia.

He was educated at the Dominican order gymnasium of his native town, and in 1790 entered, as a novice, the Benedictine abbey of Marienmunster, in the Bishopric of Paderborn. His Benedictine name was Leander. He was priest at Schwalenberg from 1799 to 1821 after which he became extraordinary professor of theology and joint-director of the teacher's seminary at Marburg. In 1818 he received the doctorate of theology and of canonical law.

In 1807 he and his cousin Karl van Ess had published a German translation of the New Testament, and since its distribution was disapproved by his superiors, he published a defense of his views in 1808, entitled Auszuge aus den heiligen Vätern und anderen Lehrern der katholischen Kirche über das nothwendige und nützliche Bibellesen. An improved edition of this tractate was published in 1816, under the title Gedanken über Bibel und Bibellehre, and in the same year appeared Was war die Bibel den ersten Christen? In 1822 he published the first part of a German translation of the Old Testament, which was completed in 1836.

In 1822 he resigned his offices at Marburg to devote his entire time to the defense of his views on Bible reading by the people, and to attempt to promote the spread of the scriptures. He was affiliated first with the Catholic Bible Society of Regensburg, and then with the British and Foreign Bible Society. He died at Affolterbach in the Odenwald.

== See also ==
- Bible translations into German
