= Radishchevo, Ulyanovsk Oblast =

Radishchevo Радищево
- Urban-type settlement
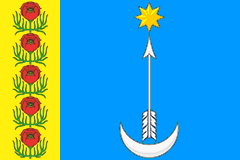
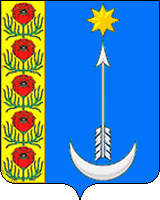
- Flag Coat of arms
- Interactive map of Radishchevo
- Location of Radishchevo Radishchevo (Ulyanovsk Oblast)
- Coordinates: 52.8521°N 47.8711°E
- Country: Russia
- Federal subject: Ulyanovsk Oblast
- Administrative district: Radishchevsky District
- Founded: 1699

Population (2010 Census)
  - Total: 4,598
  - Estimate (2021): 3,933 (−14.5%)
- Time zone: UTC+4 (UTC+04:00)
- Postal code: 433910
- OKTMO ID: 73634151051

Radishchevo (Russian: Ради́щево) is an urban locality (an urban-type settlement) in Radishchevsky District of Ulyanovsk Oblast, Russia. Population: 4,598 (2010 census); 4,888 (2002 census); 4,710 (1989 Soviet census).
