= Radishchevsky District =

Radishchevsky District Радищевский район (Russian)
- District
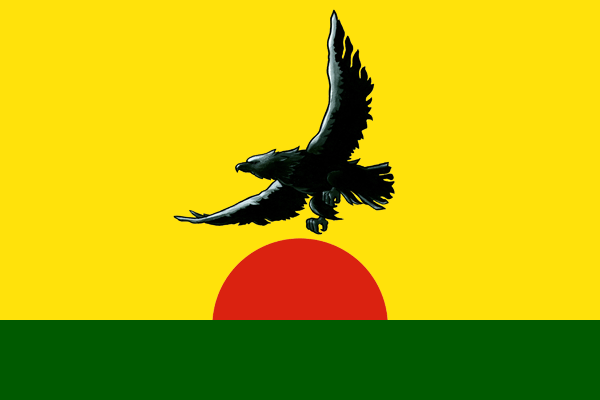
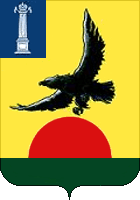
- Flag Coat of arms
- Location of Radishchevsky District in Ulyanovsk Oblast
- Coordinates: 52°51′N 47°53′E
- Country: Russia
- Federal subject: Ulyanovsk Oblast
- Established: 25 January 1935
- Administrative center: Radishchevo

Area
  - Total: 1,637 km^{2} (632 sq mi)

Population (2010 Census)
  - Total: 14,284
  - Density: 8.726/km^{2} (22.60/sq mi)
  - Urban: 32.2%
  - Rural: 67.8%

Administrative structure
  - Administrative divisions: 1 Settlement okrugs, 4 Rural okrugs
  - Inhabited localities: 1 urban-type settlements, 30 rural localities

Municipal structure
  - Municipally incorporated as: Radishchevsky Municipal District
  - Municipal divisions: 1 urban settlements, 4 rural settlements
- Time zone: UTC+4 (UTC+04:00)
- OKTMO ID: 73634000
- Website: http://www.radishevo.ulregion.ru/

Radishchevsky District (Russian: Ради́щевский райо́н) is an administrative and municipal district (raion), one of the twenty-one in Ulyanovsk Oblast, Russia. It is located in the south of the oblast. The area of the district is 1,637 square kilometers (632 sq mi). Its administrative center is the urban locality (a work settlement) of Radishchevo. Population: 14,284 (2010 Census); 15,770 (2002 Census); 15,809 (1989 Soviet census). The population of Radishchevo accounts for 32.2% of the district's total population.
