= Radishchev =

Radishchev Ради́щев
- Urban-type settlement
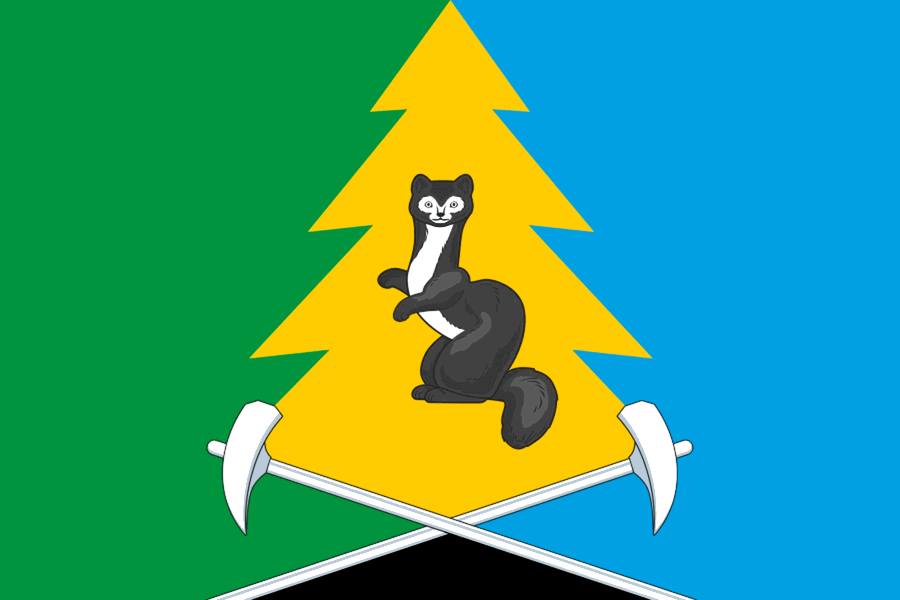
- Flag
- Interactive map of Radishchev
- Location of Radishchev Radishchev (Irkutsk Oblast)
- Coordinates: 57°13′30″N 103°29′24″E
- Country: Russia
- Federal subject: Irkutsk Oblast
- Administrative district: Nizhneilimsky District
- Elevation: 336 m (1,102 ft)

Population (2010 Census)
  - Total: 1,140
  - Estimate (2025): 865 (−24.1%)
- Time zone: UTC+8 (MSK+5)
- Postal code: 665698
- OKTMO ID: 25626162051

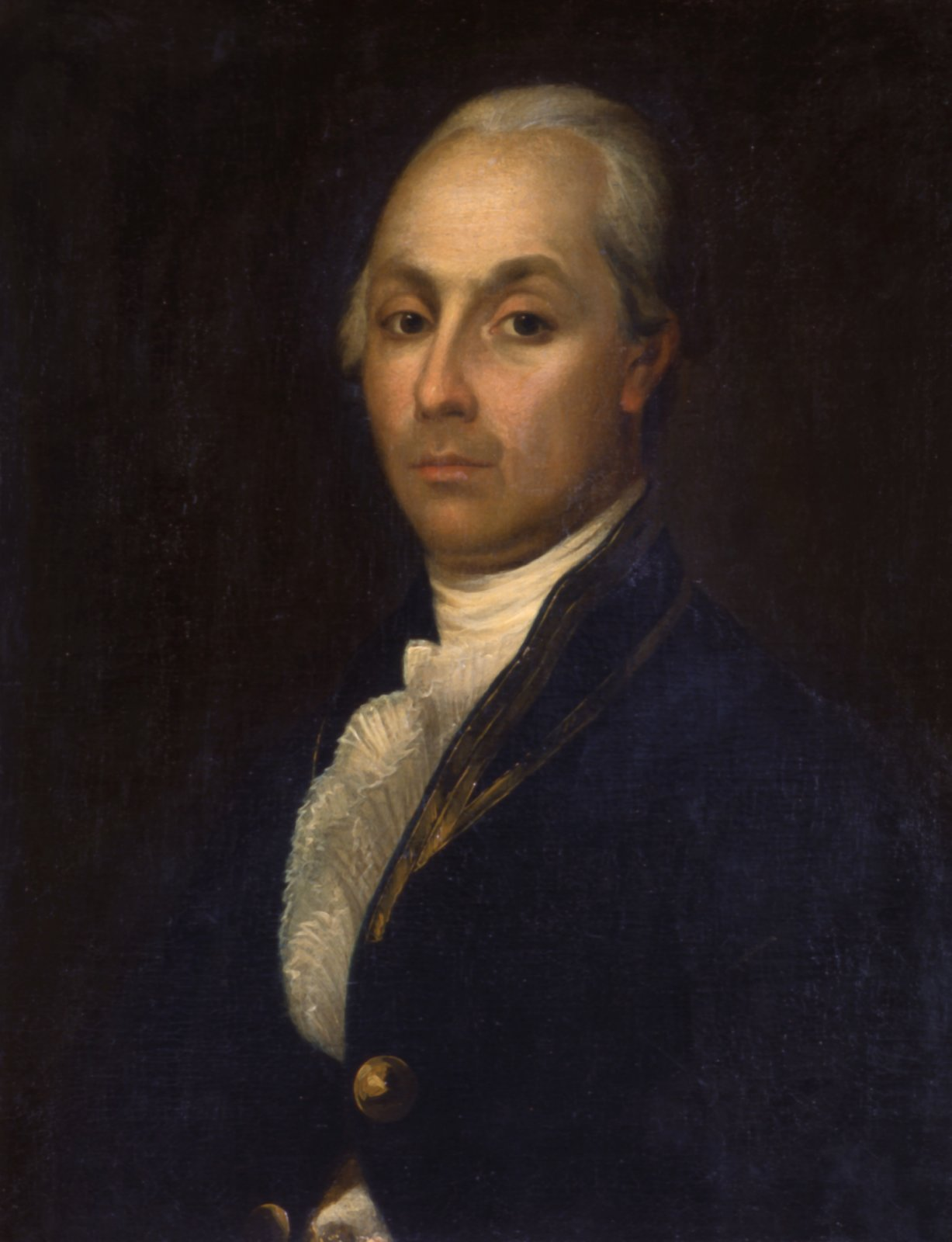
Alexander Radishchev, a Russian writer after whom the settlement was named

Radishchev (Russian: Ради́щев) is an urban locality (a work settlement) in Nizhneilimsky District of Irkutsk Oblast, Russia. Population: 1,140 (2010 census); 1,310 (2002 census); 1,395 (1989 Soviet census).
