= Catherine Norton Sinclair =

American actress

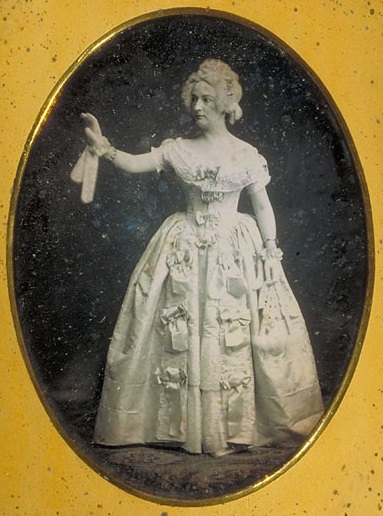
- Born: Catherine Norton Sinclair; February 20, 1817; London, England
- Died: June 9, 1891 (aged 74); New York City, US
- Resting place: Silver Mount Cemetery; Staten Island, United States
- Occupation: Actor/Theatre Manager
- Spouse: Edwin Forrest (m. 1837; div. 1852)

Catherine Norton Sinclair (1817–1891) was an actress-manager who worked with such notable actors as Junius Brutus Booth, Edwin Booth, and Laura Keene. Her sensational divorce from Edwin Forrest captivated the American public in the mid-1800s.

== Early life ==
Sinclair was born in London, the eldest of John and Catherine Sinclair's four children. The Sinclairs were originally from Edinburgh, Scotland. Mr. Sinclair became a successful drummer in the militia and later a well-known singer, who toured the U.S. in the early 1830s. She was well-educated, and welcomed in the social and cultural circles of London society. At age nineteen, Sinclair attended a performance of The Gladiator, starring the popular American actor, Edwin Forrest, as Spartacus. She arranged to meet him and on June 23, 1837, they were married at a church in Covent Garden. Shortly thereafter, the Forrests moved to New York and lived there for the next twelve years.

== Life in the U.S. and the Forrest Divorce Case ==
By many accounts, the Forrests lived as a happily married couple in New York from 1837–1849. Forrest became one of the prominent actors of his time, especially after his success in London, where previously American actors were not taken seriously. Forrest's acting work took him throughout the U.S., sometimes accompanied by Mrs. Forrest, who otherwise spent her time at their home on 22nd St. in New York City (NYC). Unfortunately, the Forrests had four children die during or immediately after childbirth.

Mrs. Forrest's parents and sisters also spent considerable time in the U.S. and lived much of the time with the Forrests in NYC. One sister, Mrs. Voorhees, lived with her husband in NYC. Whenever Forrest toured outside of NYC, Mrs. Voorhees usually stayed with her at the Forrest home on 22nd St.

Mrs. Forrest was an intellectual and a captivating conversationalist, who was quickly accepted into the social circle of the literary and artistic elite of NYC. The literati discussed such works as George Sand's novel,Consuelo, which proved fateful to the Forrests' marriage. Mrs. Forrest was known to socialize at home with other members of this social circle while Forrest was working onstage, either in New York or in other venues around the country. Forrest himself did not participate "and did not enjoy home company." (p. 347)

The Forrests' marriage began to unravel in 1848 when Forrest began to suspect that his wife had been unfaithful to him. The event that led to the Forrests' separation and divorce trial concerned Mrs. Forrest's relationship with George W. Jamieson, one of Forrest's fellow actors. While on tour in Cincinnati, Forrest left his wife in the company of Jamieson while running an errand. Apparently suspicious, he returned ahead of schedule and encountered Jamieson performing an amateur phrenological study of Mrs. Forrest's head. Forrest accepted this explanation but later took advantage of Mrs. Forrest's absence from home to read a letter Jamieson wrote to her in the form of George Sand's novel, Consuelo. According to Mrs. Forrest, who defended the novel, she had challenged Jamieson to write a love letter that rivaled Mrs. Sand's work in the novel. Mr. Forrest was unconvinced and immediately asked for a separation from Mrs. Forrest.

The Forrests made a pledge to avoid publicizing the reasons for their separation, but by December 1849/January 1850 they both made public accusations about infidelity. Forrest sued for divorce in Pennsylvania with Mrs. Forrest filing a countersuit in New York shortly thereafter. Forrest's suit was rejected for reasons of non-residency in the state of Pennsylvania. Both parties accused the other of numerous incidents of infidelity.

Their very sensational divorce publicized and provided vivid detail of the following accusations. Mrs. Forrest, represented by Charles O'Conor, accused Forrest of multiple affairs, most notably with the actress Josephine Clifton but also including several women living in New York. Forrest, represented by John Van Buren, accused his wife of scandalous and immoral behavior with several men, including Jamieson and the poet Nathaniel Parker Willis, who was named as a co-respondent in the case. Earlier, Willis published an anti-Forrest pamphlet, which led to Forrest beating Willis with a whip. Willis later filed another suit against Forrest as a result.

On January 24, 1852, after six weeks of testimony, the court found in favor of Mrs. Forrest. Forrest's career was unaffected although he left the stage for a number of years. The settlement called for Forrest to pay $3000 alimony per year. He challenged the ruling for sixteen years, but eventually paid $68,000 in arrears and was obligated to pay $4000 per year afterwards. Mrs. Forrest received $100,000 from his estate when he died in 1872.

== Life in the Theatre ==
Sinclair, circa 1868

Sinclair, who reverted to her maiden name after the divorce, had never intended a life on the stage and had never appeared onstage before her divorce, began her career as an actress shortly after the divorce, partly due to Forrest's challenge of the court ruling. She began working with the actor George Vandenhoff to prepare for a life of acting. On February 22, 1852, Sinclair appeared as Lady Teazle in School for Scandal at Brougham's Lyceum Theatre in New York. She ran to full houses for eight consecutive nights. Some of her lines mirrored her well-known personal experiences and were greeted with delight by the audiences.

In 1853, Sinclair moved to California to continue her acting career. In San Francisco, she appeared as Katherine opposite Edwin Booth's Petruchio in The Taming of the Shrew. In September, she played Portia to Booth's Shylock in The Merchant of Venice. Together they performed the melodrama The Marble Heart for an unprecedented forty three consecutive nights. Sinclair is reported to have worn a French gown worth $1200 ($19 was considered extravagant for a costume at that time).

By Christmas, she became one of the few female actress managers by leasing the Metropolitan Theatre, "a very grand house against which smelly little San Francisco Hall couldn't hope to compete." She opened on Christmas Eve with School for Scandal and hired Edwin Booth for juvenile leads and the rising star Laura Keene to play opposite him. Booth's brother, Junius, also worked for Sinclair at the Metropolitan. Keene and Booth opened in The Love Chase, which did not receive good reviews. Keene blamed this failure on "Booth's bad acting. Sinclair's Metropolitan Theatre, which she called the "most magnificent temple of histrionic art in America," offered melodramas, burlesques, and romances starring the famous actors of the day.

Throughout the 1850s, Sinclair acted in London, Australia, and the U.S. Her reviews lauded her physical beauty and stage presence, but her main attraction seems to have been her status as the former Mrs. Forrest. Her final performance was on December 18, 1859, at the Academy of Music in New York City. She retired the following year and lived with her sister, Mrs. Henry Sidley, in Staten Island.

== Later life and death ==
After her sister's death, Sinclair lived in New York City with her nephew. She later went completely blind before dying in 1891 from a cerebral embolism.
