= Tremont Theatre =

Tremont Theatre may refer to:

- Tremont Theatre, Boston (1827–1843), 88 Tremont Street, Boston, Massachusetts
- Tremont Theatre, Boston (1889), 176 Tremont St., Boston, Massachusetts
- Tremont Theatre, The Bronx, a theater that once featured Josephine Clifton
