= Epes Sargent (poet) =

American poet and journalist

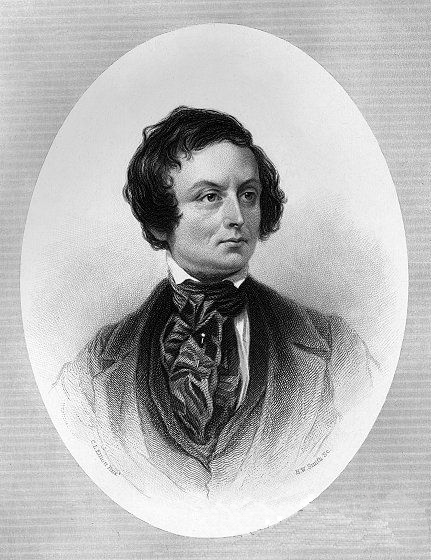

Epes Sargent (September 27, 1813– December 30, 1880) was an American editor, poet and playwright.

== Early life ==
Epes Sargent was the son of Epes Sargent (1784–1853) and Hannah Dane Coffin (1787–1819), and was born in Gloucester, Massachusetts, on September 27, 1813, where his father was a ship master. In 1818 the family moved to Roxbury, Massachusetts. From 1823 to 1829 he attended the Boston Latin School, but his education was put on hold while he traveled for six months to Saint Petersburg, Russia with his father. Upon his return he helped start the school's first literary journal, where he wrote about his travels to Russia. He then attended Harvard University where he contributed to the Harvard Collegian, a college literary journal which was started by his older brother, John Osborn Sargent (1811–1891), who became a successful politician and journalist.

== Career ==
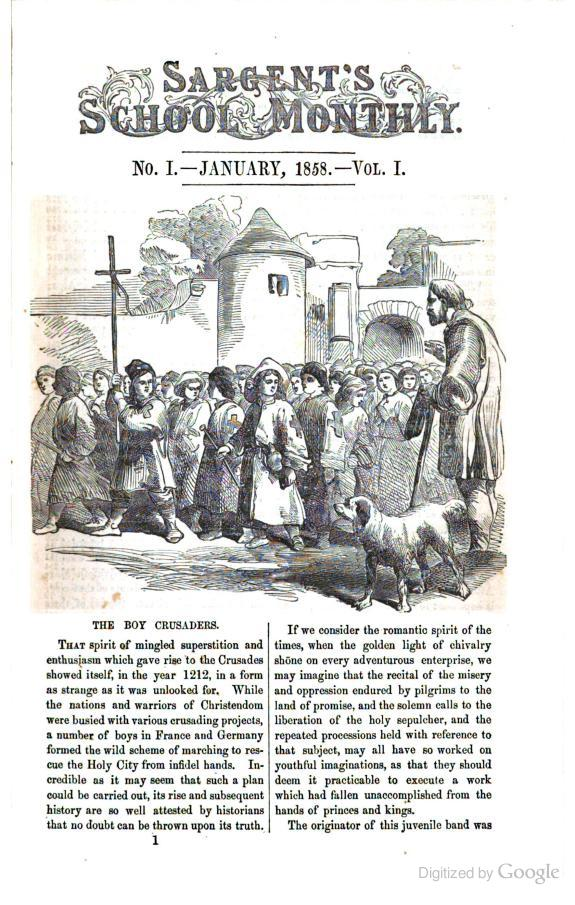
First masthead from Sargent's School Monthly, January 1858

By 1831 he was working as an editor for the Boston Daily Advertiser. He then went to work editing the Boston Daily Atlas where he also served as its Washington D.C. correspondent. While reporting political affairs he became friends with Henry Clay, Daniel Webster and John C. Calhoun. During this time he also collaborated with Samuel Griswold Goodrich, writing the Peter Parley books, which embellished the biographies of our founding fathers with "fancy and legend".

Sargent's first play, The Bride of Genoa, premiered at Boston's Tremont Theatre on February 13, 1837, with a lead role written for American actress Josephine Clifton. Set in Genoa in 1593, the play was based on the historical Antonio Montaldo, a commoner who falls in love with the daughter of a nobleman named Laura Catelli, a role given to Charlotte Cushman when it played at the Park Theater in New York in November. In 1837, he wrote the tragedy Velasco for British actress Ellen Tree. It was produced in several theaters in the United States and had moderate success in London. Velasco was critically admired by playwright Thomas Talfourd and Edgar Allan Poe, who wrote "compared with American tragedies generally, is a good tragedy — indeed, an excellent one, but, positively considered, its merits are very inconsiderable". Around this time, Sargent wrote the words to the song, "A Life on the Ocean Wave".

In 1839, Sargent moved to New York where he was associated with a succession of newspapers and magazines. He was first hired by George Pope Morris to edit the New York Mirror. Eventually he left the Mirror and went to work for Park Benjamin, Sr. as the editor of The New World. He published a biography on Henry Clay in 1842 and in 1843 started his own, short-lived, literary magazine, Sargent's New Monthly Magazine. In 1844 his collection The Light of the Lighthouse and Other Poems was published and then in 1845, he published his first novel, Fleetwood, or the Stain of Birth, a novel about American life. In 1846 he wrote and edited The Modern Standard Drama, a seven volume collection of the most popular acting plays of the time.

Sargent was considered a member of the "Knickerbocker group", a group which also included Washington Irving, William Cullen Bryant, James Kirke Paulding, Gulian Verplanck, Fitz-Greene Halleck, Joseph Rodman Drake, Robert Charles Sands, Lydia M. Child, and Nathaniel Parker Willis.

== Later years ==
Sargent was a very respected literary figure by the time he returned to Boston in 1847, when he became editor to The Boston Evening Transcript. It was noted that under his care the newspaper "showed an increasing tenderness toward the Abolitionists". In 1848 he married Elizabeth Weld (1820–1902); the couple had no children.

He developed a series of school books, The Standard Speaker and The Standard Reader, which were used in Boston schools for many years. In 1858 he started a children's monthly periodical, Sargent's School Monthly, but by the end of the year it was absorbed by the magazine, Forrester's Playmate. He continued to publish poems, fiction and dramas prodigiously.

Sargent became captivated with the notion of communicating with "the beyond". He hosted many séances, and philosophical discussions. He published Planchette, or the Despair of Science (1869), The Proof Palpable of Immortality (1875), and The Scientific Basis of Spiritualism (1880).

His monumental book, Harper's Cyclopaedia of British and American Poets (1881), was not published until after his death. Sargent died in Boston from oral cancer on December 30, 1880.

== Works ==
- The Bride of Genoa (1836)
- Velasco: A Tragedy in Five Acts (1839)
- Wealth and Worth: or, Which Makes the Man? (1842)
- The Light of the Lighthouse and Other Poems (1844)
- Fleetwood, or the Stain of Birth (1845)
- Songs of the Sea and Other Poems (1847)
- The Life and Services of Henry Clay (1848)
- Poems (1858)
- Peculiar: A Tale of the Great Transition (1864)
- Planchette, or the Despair of Science (1869)
- The Woman Who Dared (1870)
- The Proof Palpable of Immortality (1875)
- The Scientific Basis of Spiritualism (1880)
- Harper's Cyclopaedia of British and American Poets (1881)
- The Scientific Basis of Spiritualism (1891)
