= The Gladiator (play) =

1831 American drama

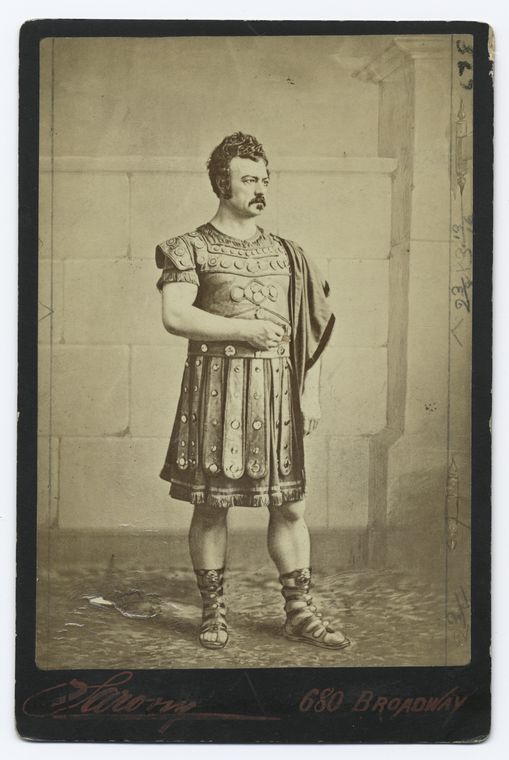
- Edwin Forrest as Spartacus
- Original language: English
- Written by: Robert Montgomery Bird
- Subject: Thracian slave revolt
- Genre: Melodrama
- Setting: Rome and parts of Italy, 73 B.C.

Premiere
- Date: 26 September 1831
- Place: New York City

The Gladiator is a tragic melodrama in five acts written by Robert Montgomery Bird originally starring Edwin Forrest. It first premiered on September 26, 1831, at the Park Theatre in New York City.

== Background ==
This theatrical piece was written at the request of Edwin Forrest, an American actor seeking to further his career. He wanted to solidify his fame by acquiring the rights to perform in plays customized to highlight his talents and physical attributes so he devised a contest to encourage dramaturgs to author new works in return for a cash prize. Metamora; or, The Last of the Wampanoags, a play by John Augustus Stone won Forrest's inaugural play prize in 1829. A huge success, Metamora inspired Forrest to continue offering the prize. Robert Montgomery Bird, a doctor without "an all-consuming passion for medicine," hearing of the prize, penned and submitted his first play, the blank verse tragedy Pelopidas, or The Fall of the Polemarchs. Although Pelopidas won the prize, it was not produced or published until 1919, possibly because Pelopidas does not dominate the action of his play in the way Metamora managed and therefore failed to show off Forrest's abilities adequately. However, Forrest found it well written and encouraged a second submission by Bird. The following year, Bird won Forrest's prize a second time with that play that would become his most impactful, The Gladiator. Bird's brother Henry, in a letter advised Robert to continue with The Gladiator as Spartacus was "altogether more suited to Forrest's Roman figure & actions." In fact, it turned out to be the perfect vehicle to showcase Forrest's “muscular acting style”. Thanks to The Gladiator, Forrest became “the most famous American actor of his day”.

== Characters ==
- Marcus Licinius Crassus – A Roman praetor.
- Lucius Gellius – A consul.
- Scropha – A quaestor.
- Jovius – A centurion.
- Mummius – Lieutenant to Crassius.
- Batiatus Lentulus – A Capuan lanista.
- Bracchius – A Roman Lanista.
- Florus – Son of Lentulus.
- Spartacus – A Thracian gladiator.
- Phasarius – Spartacus' brother.
- Ænomaiis – A gladiator from Gaul.
- Crixus – A German gladiator.
- boy – Son to Spartacus.
- Julia – Niece of Crassus.
- Senona – Wife of Spartacus.
- Citizens, soldiers, etc.

== Synopsis ==
The Gladiator tells the story of a man yearning to live freely and removed from the oppression of totalitarian masters. Spartacus is a gladiator who initially refuses to fight because he will not “slay a man for the diversion of Romans”. The play opens with Phasarius, a Thracian slave and other gladiators decrying the position of Rome and considering a revolt against the state left vulnerable by its colonizing and war-mongering generals. However, upon heading from his lanista, Bracchius, that a newly captured Thracian gladiator is an even better fighter than himself, Phasarius resolves to postpone his plans for coup. This newly captured slave is Spartacus, who agrees to battle so that he may free his also captured wife and child. He barters his services, “I will serve you Better than slave e'er served”, in exchange for his family, “Keep us together”. Upon meeting each other in the arena of the amphitheater, however, Phasarius and Spartacus recognize each other as brothers, refuse to fight and incite their fellow gladiators to revolt. They proclaim, “Death to the Roman fiends, that make their mirth Out of the groans of bleeding misery! Ho, slaves, arise! it is your hour to kill! Kill and spare not -For wrath and liberty!-”

I thank the gods I am barbarian;
For I can better teach the grace-begot
And heaven-supported masters of the earth,
How a mere dweller of desert rock
Can bow their crown'd heads to his chariot wheels.

— Spartacus, in Robert Montgomery Bird's The Gladiator (1831)

War ensues. The gladiator army, led by Spartacus is initially successful in their crusade against the Romans. However, the two brothers have differing agendas: while Spartacus wants to return with his wife, Senona and son to his beloved Thrace and his live as a shepherd, Phasarius wants to sack Rome. He declares, “Whilst this city stands, This ne'er can be; for just so long our country Remains a Roman province. Tear it down, And you enfranchise Thrace, and half the world". Phasarius eventually defects from his brother's army when Spartacus forbids his advance on Julia, the captured niece of Crassus, a Roman praetor. Splintered, the various rebelling armies are easily defeated by the Romans. Phasarius, reconciled and reunited with his brother's dwindling campaign, attempts to escort Senona and her son through a forest to safety. In this attempt, Senona and her child are slain by waiting Roman troops, while Phasarius manages to stumble back to Spartacus and deliver the tragic news before he too dies. Enraged, Spartacus refuses a pardon granted to him by the Romans. In his final bloody fight, Spartacus manages to kill his former captor, Lentulus, before he is felled by multiple Roman troops over the cries of Julia's protest. Though it does not have happy ending, The Gladiator conveys the huge sacrifice man has been willing to withstand throughout history for the sake of freedom.

== Production history ==
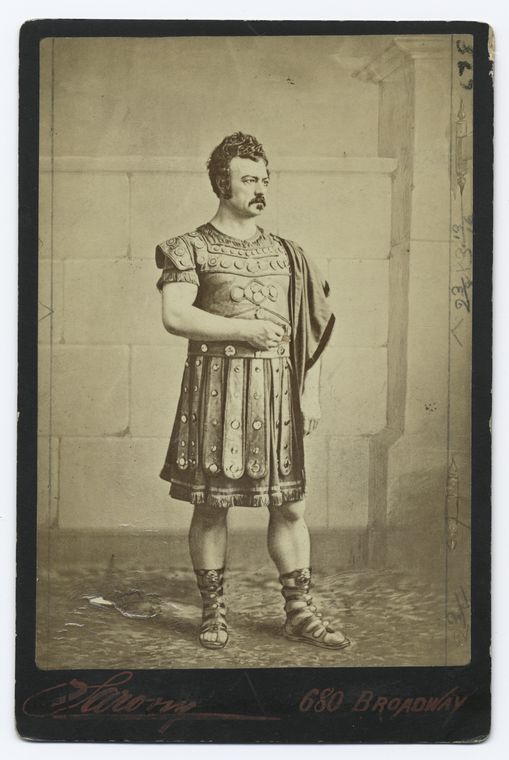
Forrest as Spartacus

The Gladiator premiered at New York's Park Theatre on September 26, 1831. Although the weather on opening night was poor, the actors in secondary roles of questionable distinction and the sets and costumes "wretchedly bad," the play was a massive success and was received with increasing enthusiasm each of the four nights it played. This original production was noted for the play's climatic Act Two in which Spartacus and Pharsarius refuse to slaughter each other. This scene was staged in a spectacular way, the likes of which had not yet been seen that century.

After such success in New York, the production moved to Philadelphia, where it was first produced on October 24 and Boston, where the play was seen in November.

The Gladiator was such a success for Forrest that he opened with it when he traveled to London in 1836. Although Forrest was a success at the Drury Lane Theatre on October 17 with The Gladiator, the audience demonstrated their desire to see Shakespeare as The Gladiator was seen by many in the audience as anti-British.

Although The Gladiator remained a central part of Forrest's repertoire, as with many pre-Civil War plays, it eventually fell out of favor as naturalism and "realistic representation" became more popular.

Even though Bird's work helped secure Forrest prominence, their partnership ended when Forrest failed to compensate Bird as they had originally agreed. In fact, Forrest's “poor treatment led Bird to become a novelist”. Notwithstanding the dissolution of their partnership, Forrest produced and starred in The Gladiator over 1000 times.

== Slavery in The Gladiator ==
The social relevance of The Gladiator is unquestionable. Spartacus is the “underdog who through thirst for individual freedom and love of family risks all in taking on a tyrannical government”. Certainly, 19th century American theater patrons could identify to this as the young country was still figuring out how to live up to the “promises of the Revolution”. But the impact reached far beyond the confines of mainstream American theater goers. Dealing with slave insurgency in Ancient Rome, The Gladiator implicitly attacks the institution of slavery in the United States by “transforming the Antebellum into neoclassical rebels”. Spartacus was born free just like the first generation of slaves in America and he valued that freedom above anything but family. Unquestionably, the play deals with many of the issues faced by the African slaves of the time including the inevitable shattering of family units resulting from individual slave sales. Spartacus’ yearning for his wife and son mirrored the plight of many slaves with family members scattered across multiple households or plantations. Although Spartacus finds himself “removed from anything like liberty and dignity”, he manages to rise from the “lowest of the low to become an inspiring role model who comes close to achieving freedom for himself and others”.

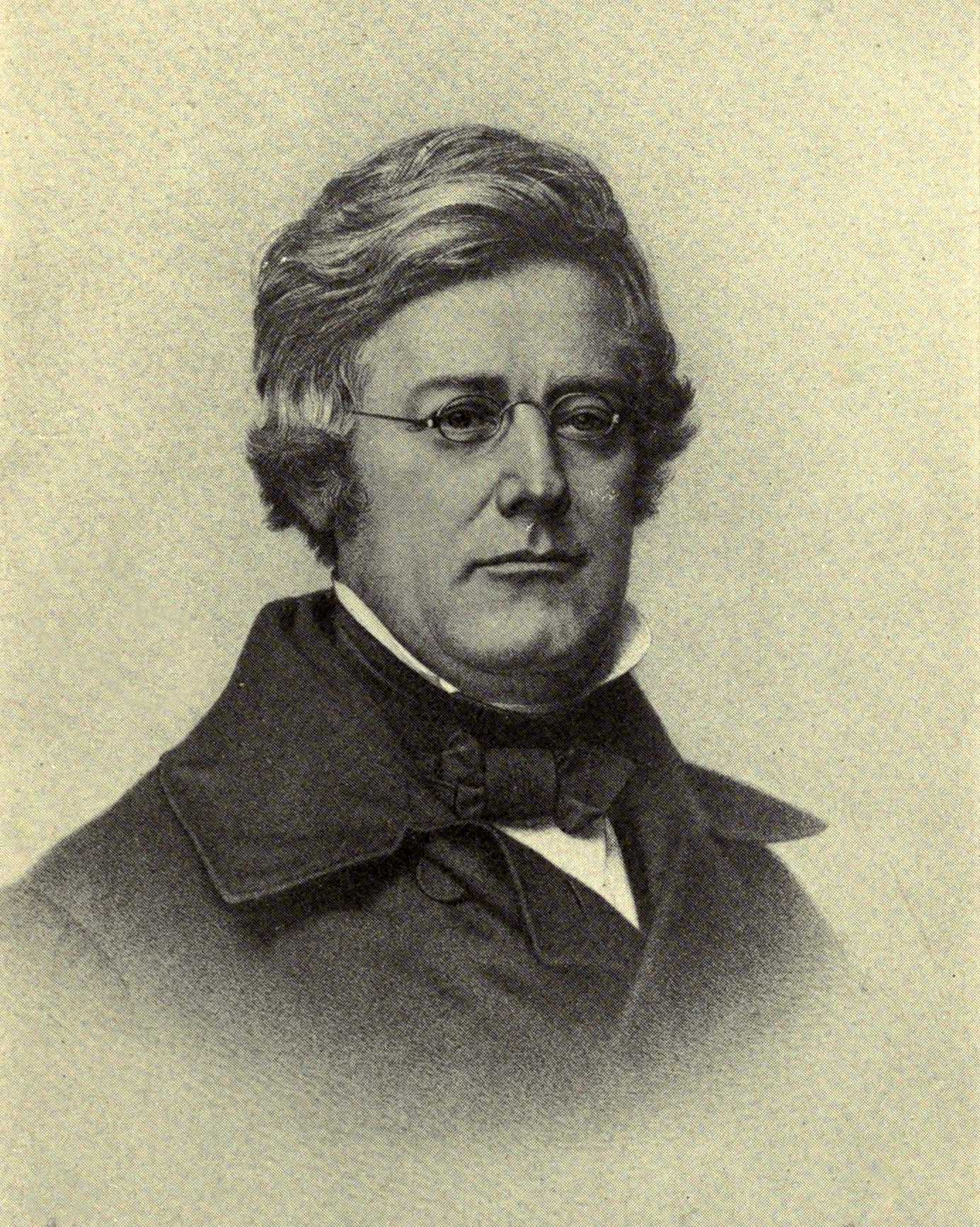
Robert Montgomery Bird

Bird's opinion on slavery in the United States is often questioned in regards to The Gladiator. The play was written in a time of great abolitionist activity: William Lloyd Garrison founded The Liberator, an influential anti-slavery newspaper, the same year as Bird wrote his play. Thus the timing of the first performance of The Gladiator was impeccable with it coinciding with the inception of The Liberator. It almost seemed to predict the slave uprising led by Nat Turner in Virginia which resulted in the deaths of many whites until Turner and his men were captured and executed.

In his appraisal of the work, Whitman insists that, "this play is as full of 'Abolitionism' as an egg is of meat." He called The Gladiator a calculated play to “make the heart of the masses well responsive to all those noble aspirations on behalf of mortal freedom”. Clearly, Whitman had no doubt of the play's abolitionist undertones. Jenna Gibbs states that Bird “used the story to denounce black slavery” and adds that, “Bird noted that his intention was an impassionate and strong dialogue about slavery”. Richards was also convinced of Bird's anti-slavery agenda stating, “The Gladiator seems intent in reminding audiences that it enacts a slave revolt”.

Yet later scholars have dissented from Whitman's surety. Though some still debate that it is not clear that he intentionally conceived The Gladiator as an abolitionist play, everyone agrees that he was fully aware of its incendiary potential in the South. Certainly, Bird did not want his play to be "damned" in the south. And while Bird himself was worried that, The Gladiator produced in a slave state would lead to, "the managers, players, and perhaps myself ... rewarded with the Penitentiary," he also differentiated between "nobel" Thracian rebels and "violent" African American slaves. Writing in his journal of the Nat Turner's Rebellion, Bird remarks, "if they had had a Spartacus among them to organize the half million of Virginia, the hundreds of thousands of the [other] states, and lead them on in the Crusade of Massacre, what a blessed example might they not give the world of the excellence of slavery."

Regardless of Bird's intention, the truth is that the play's setting could be easily changed from Rome to a Southern plantation without need to modify much else.

== Criticism ==
From the very first performance in New York City the play was a major success, both commercially and critically. Mr. Forrest's Spartacus was deemed “the perfection of the art histrionic” and “one of the gems that shone upon the stage”. Amongst other praise accorded The Gladiator, it was called "the best native tragedy extant," "decidedly the best drama ever written in this century" with "the stamp of genius in every lineament." The prominent Philadelphia critic, Wemyss called the play, upon its opening in that city, "the perfection of melodramatic tragedy." The play was indeed a huge success in Philadelphia as well as Boston and other cities in the Northeastern United States. Writing in The Brooklyn Eagle in late 1846, Walt Whitman also discusses Forrest's talent, citing the actor as "a deserved favorite with the public."

While the relationship between The Gladiator and its playwright to slavery is much debated (see above), the play is often seen as the pinnacle of romanticism in American drama. Written only a few years following the inauguration of Andrew Jackson, the play is Anti-imperial and anti-British where distant colonies are persecuted while ancient lineages reign dominant over "the new blood of the poor," a common theme in Jacksonian political rhetoric.

The Gladiator played successfully across the country for 70 years. A marker of its enormous success may be seen in how many performances were produced: by 1854, The Gladiator had been performed over 1000 times, a remarkable feat. It was considered to be the first time a play had reached such a threshold in the playwright's lifetime. Forrest retained the play in his repertoire until his death, and it was eventually taken up by John Edward McCullough and Robert Downing.

== Legacy ==
The Gladiator's legacy was a success from its very first performance. Its theatrical acclaim can be attributed to the appeal of its star, Edwin Forrest, in conjunction with the story of the oppressed seeking freedom from despotism. The story not only capitalized on the success of the American Revolution but it fed from the cultural and societal mood of the time. By subtly tying the story of Roman slavery to that of African American slaves, Bird created a framework through which he could express his human equality views. As a result, The Gladiator became a cornerstone of American dramaturgy awarding Bird his righteous place as one of the most acclaimed playwrights of the early 19th century. Having been performed over 1000 times, The Gladiator's longevity attests to the universality of its central story touching on themes ranging from freedom and family to the sacrifice sometimes required to achieve societal rather than individual goals.

Not only is the story of The Gladiator a universally appealing tale, but Forrest's foresight in having such a play custom fitted to his ability is also an important aspect of the legacy of this work. In fact, The Gladiator's "Spartacus was perfectly conceived to meet the actor's strengths" and completely suited to "Forrest's Roman figure and actions". Spartacus is "loud, dynamic, and anti-aristocratic" which perfectly suited Forrest's image. With Forrest talents and physical abilities determining the course of the play, it is one of the first instances where a particular actor's skills and physique dictate the tone and content of a theatrical offering. Today, theatrical vehicles are often created to fit the needs and desires of many superstars and even up- and comers who are believed to be worth the time and financial investment.

Published during the "Golden Era of the American Stage", The Gladiator stands as one of the first epics written by an American author. As a theatrical piece, its impact in the American entertainment industry is irrefutable. Bird's play, with its critical and financial success, demonstrated the potential of ancient history as fodder for entertainment. It can be considered a precursor to the many works inspired or set during the Roman Empire that are found in contemporary literature and portrayed in the theatre, television shows, and feature films. For example, Broadway's Her First Roman is based on Roman Empire characters though gladiators are not central to the story. Gladiators do abound in television and film. Spartacus’ story has been told by at least one long-running television series and a 2004 made-for-TV movie starring Goran Visnjic. On the big screen, Howard Fast's novel Spartacus was adapted into film in 1960 starring Kirk Douglas and it is considered a classic. Just like Bird's play, Fast's novel has social relevance in that it reflects the fight for the “political empowerment of the working class” (Joshel et al. 91). Perhaps the most successful Roman Empire movie is the 2000 film Gladiator starring Russell Crowe. Though not directly based on Bird's work, the influence of The Gladiator is evident throughout Crowe's film. Although the story is different, the heroic central figure, Maximus, is uncannily similar to Spartacus including the yearning for family, his failed attempt at escaping Roman rule, and his untimely sacrificial death. Just like Forrest, the actors in both of the films mentioned had input regarding the content of the films and used them as career building vehicles.

== See also ==
- Spartacus
- Edwin Forrest
- Robert Montgomery Bird
