= Robert Montgomery Bird =

American novelist, playwright, physician

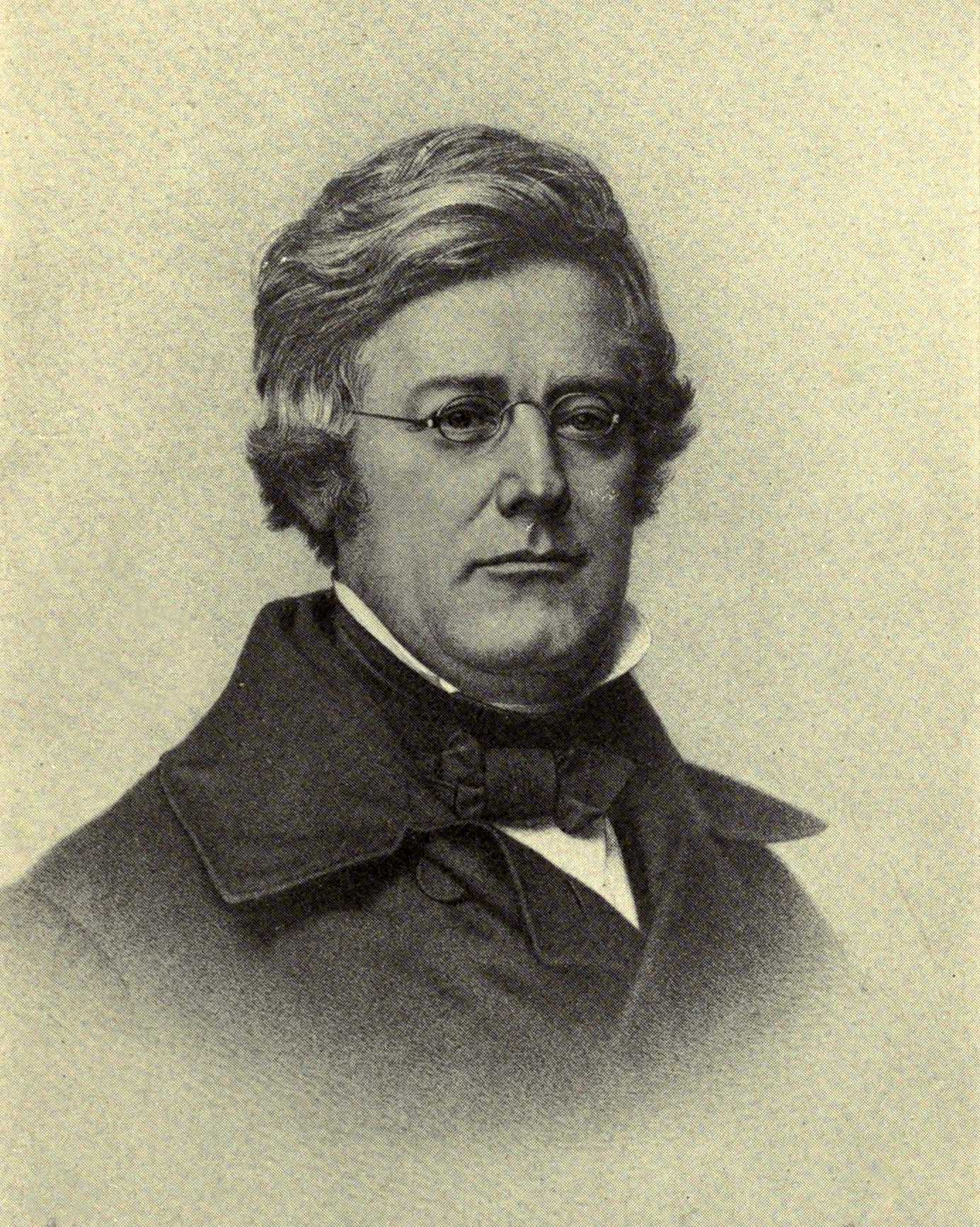
- Born: February 5, 1806; New Castle, Delaware, U.S.
- Died: January 23, 1854 (aged 47); Philadelphia, Pennsylvania, U.S.
- Resting place: Laurel Hill Cemetery, Philadelphia, Pennsylvania, U.S.
- Occupations: Novelist; playwright; physician

Robert Montgomery Bird (February 5, 1806 – January 23, 1854) was an American novelist, playwright, and medical doctor.

== Early life and education ==
Bird was born in New Castle, Delaware, on February 5, 1806. He was born into a pioneer family. His father was a prosperous partner in the firm of Bird and Riddle, Navy agents. Following the death of his father when Bird was four years old, his mother and brothers moved to Philadelphia, but he was taken in by a rich uncle, Nicholas Van Dyke, in New Castle. Bird then attended New Castle Academy, where he was encouraged to develop his musical skills. He later wrote that his school years were not pleasant. After attending the New Castle Academy and Germantown Academy, he graduated from the University of Pennsylvania in 1824.

Bird started to write commentary on Latin, American, and English literature, particularly the Elizabethan playwrights. He then started to write short poems and fiction during his time in medical school. He had little passion for medicine. By 1827, he had published items in the Philadelphia Monthly Magazine along with two comedies, 'Twas All for the Best and News of the Night. After graduating from medical school, he attempted to begin a medical practice, but became discouraged after one year and left medicine to pursue a literary career.

== Career ==
In a small notebook labeled "Useful Works- if well prepared," Bird set his goal to write nine biographies, thirty volumes of miscellaneous studies, three volumes of tales, some select novels of Boccaccio, the Arabian Nights, eleven tragedies, twelve comedies, thirty-three melodramas, and twenty-five novels. He did not approach his career casually. When he learned of Forrest's contest, he entered; in 1828, Bird's play Pelopidas won a $1000 prize offered by the actor Edwin Forrest, but was never produced because Forrest found the play unsuitable to highlight his strengths as a performer. With Forrest's guidance, Bird wrote another play, The Gladiator, which was produced in 1831. It was perfect to showcase Forrest's muscular acting style. It also went really well in the theatre. It was the first play to be performed so often in the author's lifetime. This launched Bird as a playwright. Bird and Forrest quickly became friends. Bird wrote several other plays for Forrest, some of them being Oralloossa, Son of the Incas and The Broker of Bogota. Forrest had promised to pay Bird more for these plays if they proved successful. Though they were, Forrest refused to give Bird additional money. He did not want to share in his success (which must have been at least a hundred thousand dollars on Gladiator alone). Bird's frustration with Forrest pushed him into writing novels. These include Calavar (1834), The Infidel (1835), The Hawks of Hawk-Hollow (1835), Sheppard Lee (1836), Nick of the Woods (1837) (his most successful novel), and The Adventures of Robin Day (1839). Calavar and The Infidel are notable for their graphic and accurate details and descriptions of Mexican history. In an 877-page study of American literature from the Revolutionary War through 1940, scholar Alexander Cowie found The Hawks of Hawk-Hollow second only to Logan by John Neal (1822) in its level of incoherence. His final novel was A Belated Revenge, and it was finished by his son, Frederick M. Bird (1889).

Bird also pursued a number of other interests. In 1837, he began a career as a journalist, working as the Associate Editor for The American Monthly Magazine. He became the editor of the North American Magazine and United States Gazette in 1847. He also taught medicine at the Pennsylvania Medical College and ran for Congress in 1842 (an attempt which was later aborted).

The five years from 1834 to 1839 were filled with too much activity: six novels and a part of a seventh, his marriage, the birth of his son, and his final bitter quarrel with Forrest. According to Christopher Looby, "Bird's biographers say that the intensity of these literary labors led to a breakdown of his health, possibly including a mental disorder, and that he retired to a farm on the Eastern Shore of Maryland in 1840 to restore himself."

In 1853, he was elected as a member to the American Philosophical Society.

He then changed his occupation again. He became the Professor of the Institutes of Medicine and Materia Medica at the Pennsylvania Medical College in Philadelphia (1841–1843). During this period he met Senator John M. Clayton, became interested in politics, was a delegate to the Whig Convention in Baltimore in 1844, and in 1848 wrote a campaign biography of General Zachary Taylor. He then bought a third interest in the Philadelphia North American and United States Gazett. This was his final profession. He became ill in the early winter of 1853, and it was too late to seek remedy in a change of occupation. He died on January 23, 1854, of effusion of the brain.

He is buried at Laurel Hill Cemetery in Philadelphia.
