= Tremont Theatre (Boston) =

Former playhouse

Coordinates: 42°21′27″N 71°03′39″W

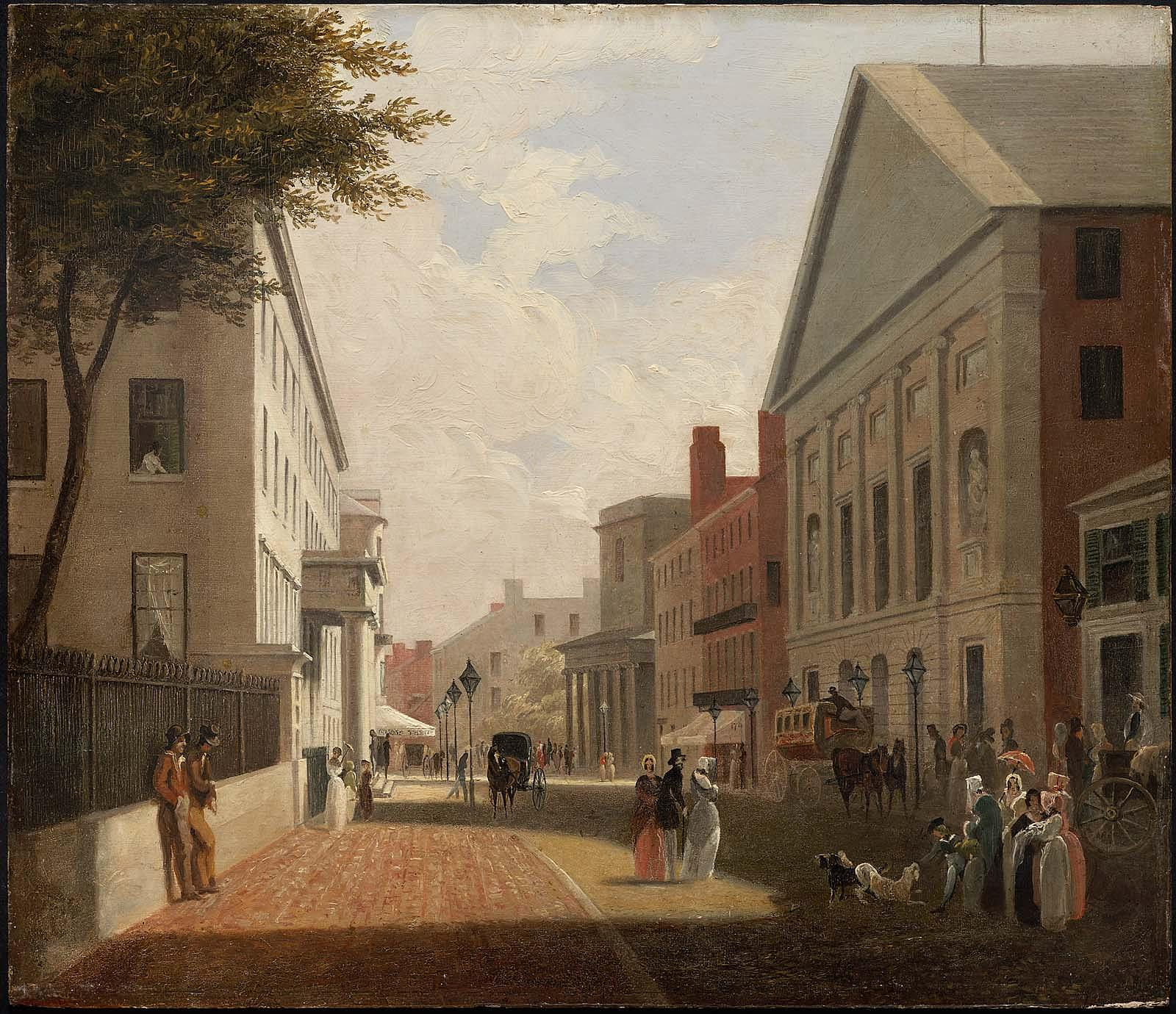
Tremont Theatre (at right), Tremont Street, Boston, ca. 1843 (Museum of Fine Arts, Boston)

The Tremont Theatre (1827–1843) on 88 Tremont Street was a playhouse in Boston. A group of wealthy Boston residents financed the building's construction. Architect Isaiah Rogers designed the original Theatre structure in 1827 in the Greek Revival style. The playhouse opened on 24 September 1827.

== History ==
In the early part of the 19th Century, Boston was still a small town, not yet the bustling metropolis it is today. The town already had one playhouse, the Federal Street Theatre, and the city's small population made supporting a second theatre difficult. The owners tried to bring in patrons by booking big-name performers. These included Junius Brutus Booth, Charlotte Cushman, George Washington Dixon, Fanny Elssler, Edwin Forrest, John Gilbert, Charles and Fanny Kemble, and Thomas D. Rice. Nevertheless, the Tremont never turned a profit during its 16-year life.

Around 1829 Tom Comer served as musical director.

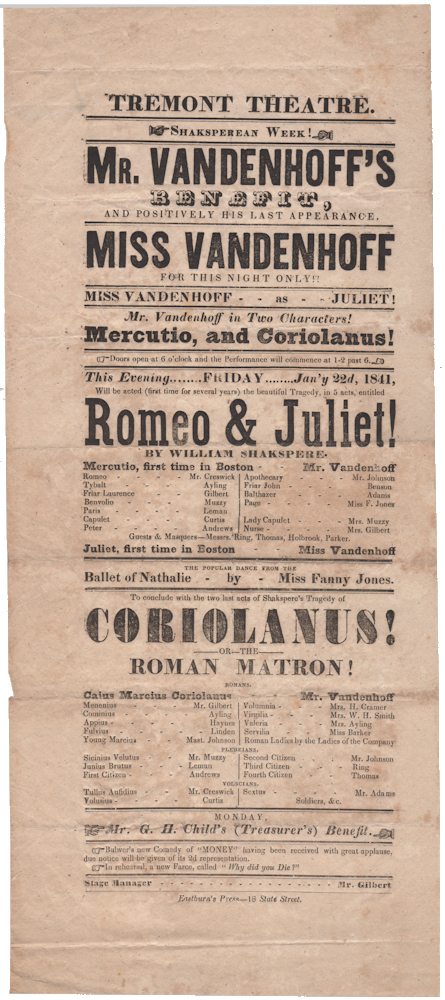
23 January 1841 in Boston

In 1841 leading British actors John and Charlotte Vandenhoff were in America. They had arrived in 1839 and appeared in New York and Philadelphia. They appeared at the Tremont Theatre in a benefit for John Vandenhoff. Charlotte played Juliette and her father in his "very last role" played Mercutio and on the same night he took the title role in Coriolanus.

On 28 December 1843, the Free Church Baptists bought the theatre and renamed it the Tremont Temple. Although the building was largely used for religious events after this, it still served as the venue for public events on occasion.

== Image gallery ==
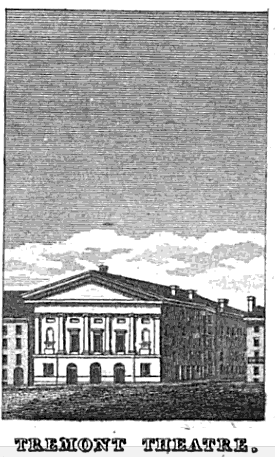
Tremont Theatre, ca.1838

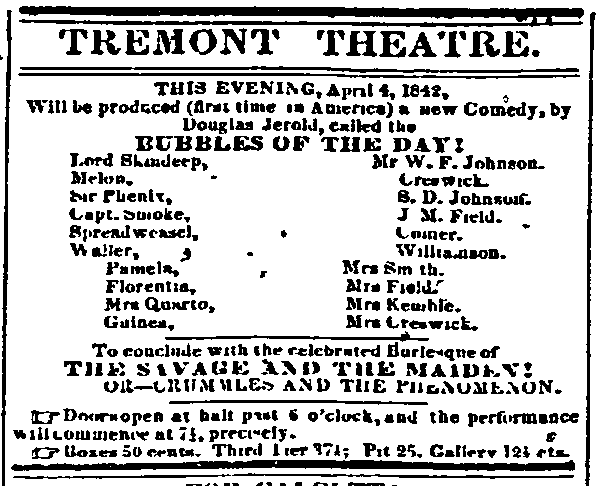
Advertisement for "Bubbles of the Day," 1842

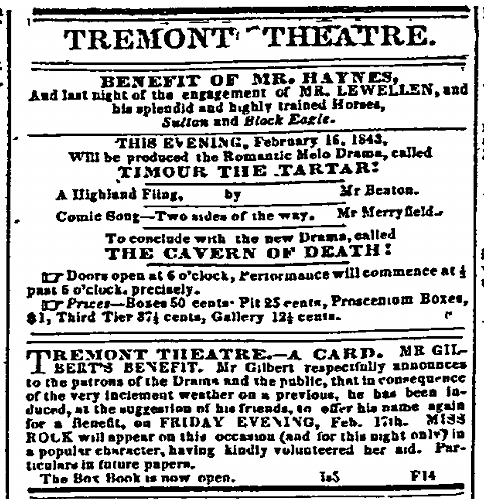
Advertisement for "Timour the Tartar" and "Cavern of Death," 1843

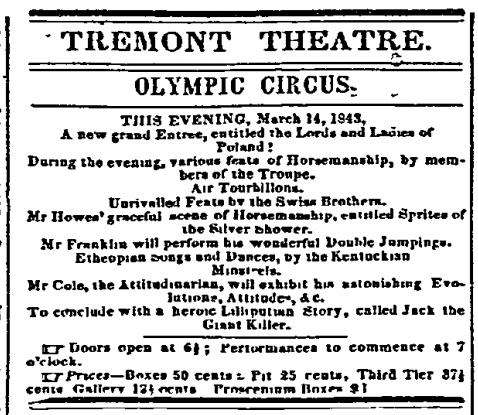
Advertisement for Olympic Circus, 1843

== See also ==
- Tremont Temple, est.1843
