= The Duchess de la Vallière =

1837 play

- Original language: English
- Written by: Edward Bulwer-Lytton
- Genre: Historical
- Setting: France, 17th century

Premiere
- Date: 4 January 1837
- Place: Theatre Royal, Covent Garden, London

The Duchess de la Vallière is an 1837 historical play by the British writer Edward Bulwer-Lytton. It is based on the life of Louise de La Vallière, a French aristocrat and mistress of Louis XIV in the seventeenth century. It premiered at the Theatre Royal, Covent Garden on 4 January 1837. The original cast included Helena Faucit as Louise de la Vallière, William Macready as the Marquis Alphonso de Bragelone, John Vandenhoff as Louis XIV, William Farren as the Duke of Lauzun, John Langford Pritchard as the Count de Grammont, William Harries Tilbury as Bertrand and Sarah West as Madame la Vallière.

It benefited from the more liberal licensing regime of Charles Kemble, who passed it without a protest. It was not a success, running for eight nights, and being attacked in the press for immorality. It appeared at the Park Theatre in New York on 13 May of the same year, where the title role was played by Ellen Kean.

== Bibliography ==
- Downer, Alan Seymour. The Eminent Tragedian William Charles Macready. Harvard University Press, 1966.
- Foulkes, Richard. Church and Stage in Victorian England. Cambridge University Press, 1997.
- Nicoll, Allardyce. A History of Early Nineteenth Century Drama 1800-1850. Cambridge University Press, 1930.
