= Josephine Clifton =

American actress

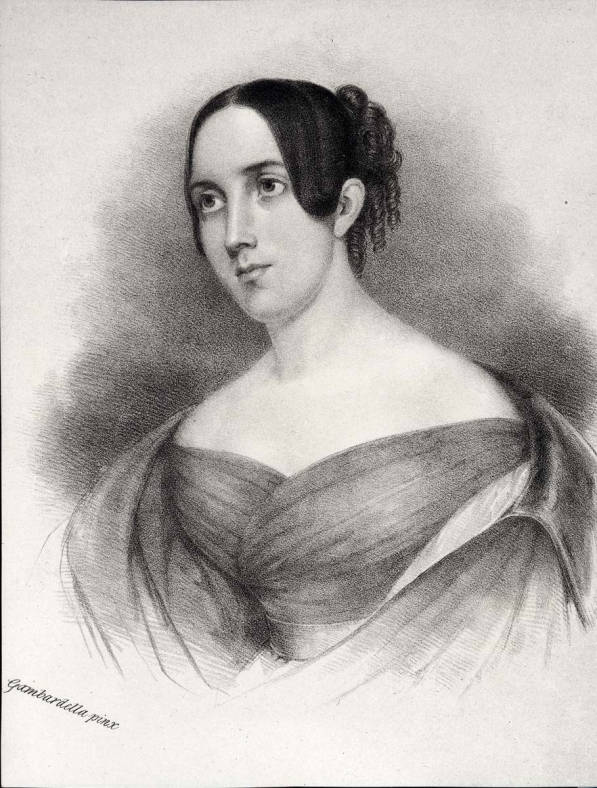
Josephine Clifton

Josephine Clifton (1813?-1847) was a stage actress who became known as "the first American actress to star in London".

== Life and career ==
The early years of Josephine Clifton seem to be lost, what little information exists is controversial. Most historians believe she was born in New York and her surname was Miller, others think she may have come from Philadelphia.

In the fall of 1831, Clifton met Thomas Hamblin, actor and manager of the Bowery Theater. He was well known for his philandering ways, so although she had no acting experience and because she was a great beauty, Hamblin made her his protegee and gave her the "beautiful ingenue" role in many of his productions. On September 21, 1831, she made her debut as Belvidera in Venice Preserved. She was Elvira in Pizarro and played Lady MacBeth. She moved to the Park Theatre to play Bianca in Fazio.

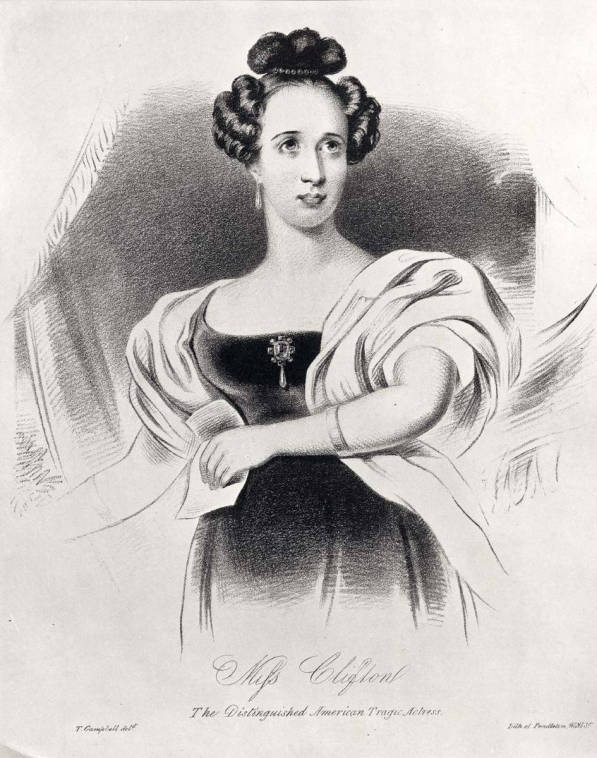
Josephine Clifton in character

Around 1834, amidst rumors of affairs, Clifton moved to London where she appeared at Drury Lane and became "the first American actress to star in London." She returned to New York where in 1836, Epes Sargent wrote a five-act play, The bride of Genoa, for her which was successfully produced by the Tremont Theatre. She then performed her most famous role, the title part in Bianca Visconti, based on the career of Francesco I Sforza. This play was written for her by Nathaniel Parker Willis in 1837, when he won the $1000 prize in a contest given by her for the best blank verse tragedy to suit her talents.

== Later years ==
She spent some of her later years in Philadelphia where she often played opposite the actor Edwin Forrest. In 1846, she married Robert Place, the manager of the American Theater in New Orleans, but she died unexpectedly the next year. After her death it was reported that her relationship with Forrest had been much more than professional, and Clifton was named as a factor during Forrest's notorious divorce.
