= George W. Jamieson =

American actor

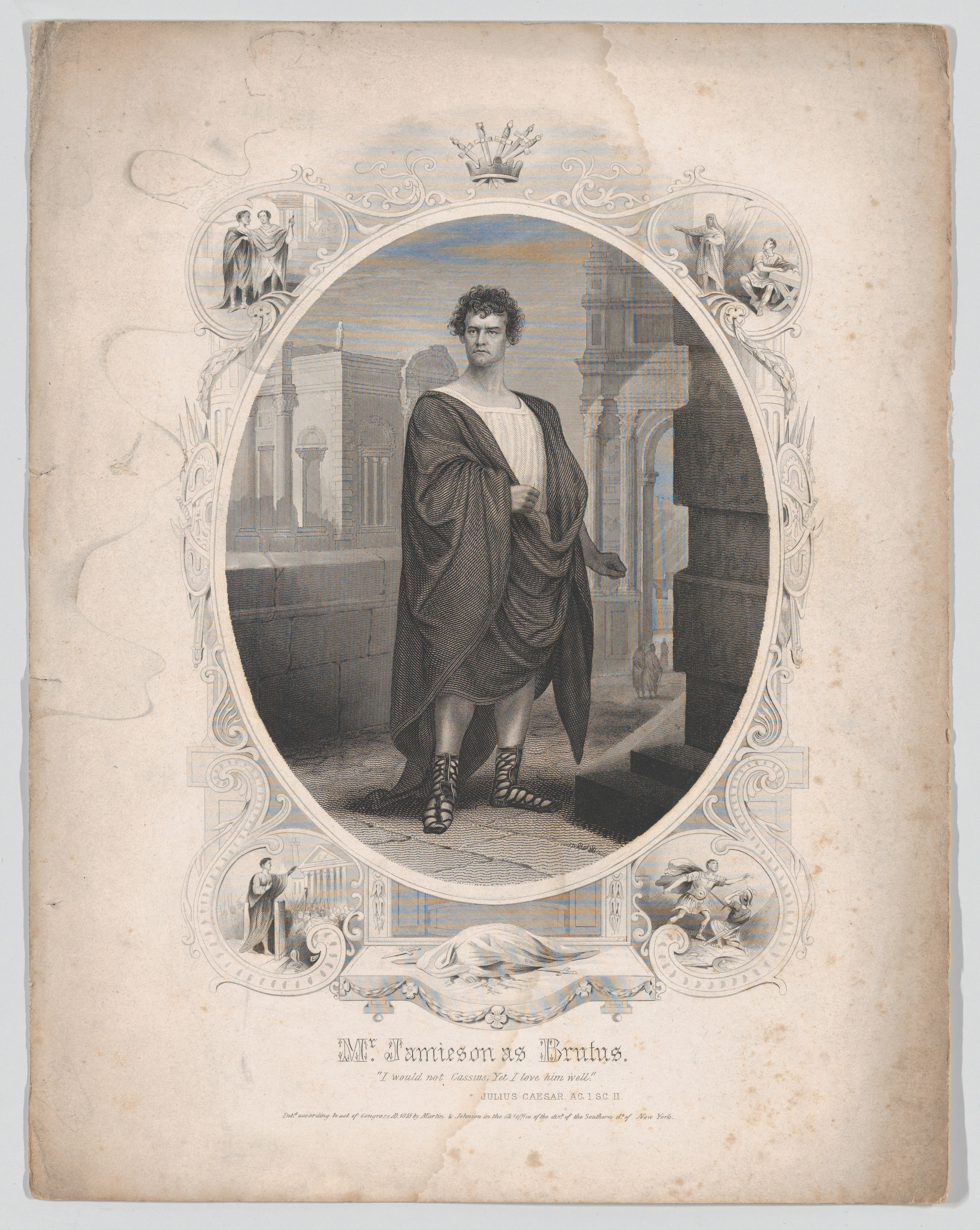
George Jamieson as Brutus in Julius Caesar, 1855

George W. Jamieson (1810-1868) was an American actor and lapidary, born in Varick Street, New York. His mother was an American of remarkable talents; his father was an Irishman. At an early age he was apprenticed to a lapidary, and in cutting gems he acquired facility, — his cameos being considered models of artistic beauty and truth. In early manhood he went to Washington, where he made excellent cameo portraits — of Henry Clay, and of other distinguished men — and where he became a favorite, both as a man and as an artist. His taste and desire, however, impelled him toward the Stage, and for that profession he studied and practised assiduously in several amateur dramatic societies.

His first regular professional appearance was made at the Bowery Theatre, New York, under the management of Hamblin, in 1835, in his own farce, "The Chameleon." his success was good and he remained an actor all his days. He was engaged in the National Theatre (Church street, New York), in 1839; he appeared in Philadelphia for the first time on October 9, 1840; and he made a professional visit to England in 1861. At one time he played opposite parts to the elder Booth and to Edwin Forrest. His Iago was his best Shakespearean impersonation, although he played Othello well, and he was a superb reader of Hamlet: but he did not make a name as a Shakespearean actor. He was later accused of having an affair with Forrest's wife, Catherine Norton Sinclair, which led to the sensational Forrest Divorce Case in the early 1850s.

His last professional appearance was made in Yonkers, where he resided for several years and was highly esteemed, and where he met an awful fate. The express train on the Hudson River Railroad that left New York on Saturday evening, October 3, 1868, bore with it his death. He had gone on an earlier train and been carried beyond the Yonkers station and landed at Glenwood, where he walked back on the railway line, and was struck and instantly killed by the express train. On Tuesday afternoon, October 6, 1868, in the village of Yonkers, friends of George W. Jamieson assembled in the church of St. John to perform funeral rites over his remains and to lay them in the grave. His grave is in a little cemetery near Yonkers.
