= Charlotte Vandenhoff =

English actress

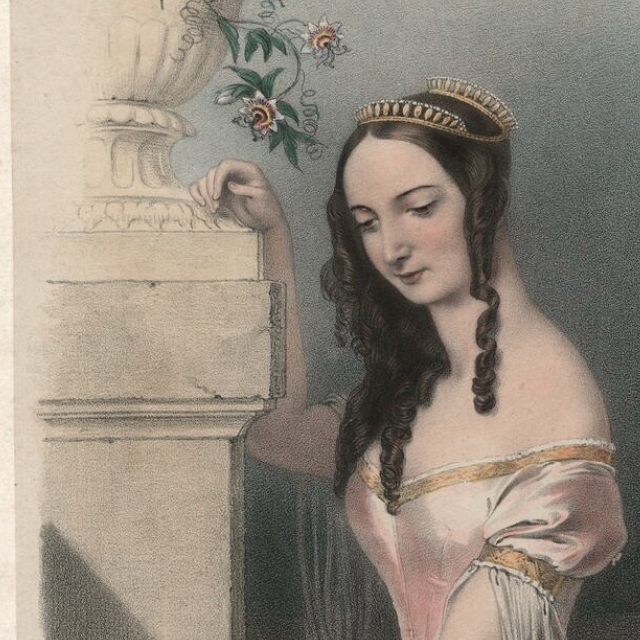
- Detail from "Miss Vandenhoff as Juliet" by Richard James Lane
- Born: 1818; Liverpool, England
- Died: 31 July 1860 (aged 41–42); Handsworth, Staffordshire, England
- Other names: Charlotte Swinbourne
- Occupation: leading actor
- Spouse: Thomas Swinbourne

Charlotte Elizabeth Vandenhoff (1818 – 31 July 1860), later Charlotte Swinbourne, was a British actress who appeared in leading theatres in London, New York and Philadelphia.

== Life ==
Vandenhoff was born in Liverpool in 1818. Her parents were Elizabeth (born Pike) and the actor John Vandenhoff. Her younger brother was the elocutionist and actor George Vandenhoff.

Her debut as an actress was in the role of Juliet at Drury Lane on 11 April 1836. She soon appeared at the other leading theatres of Covent Garden and the Haymarket. She played several roles in The Lady of Lyons (Imogen, Cordelia, and Pauline). In 1837 she took the role of Lydia in the first production of The Love Chase by Sheridan Knowles.

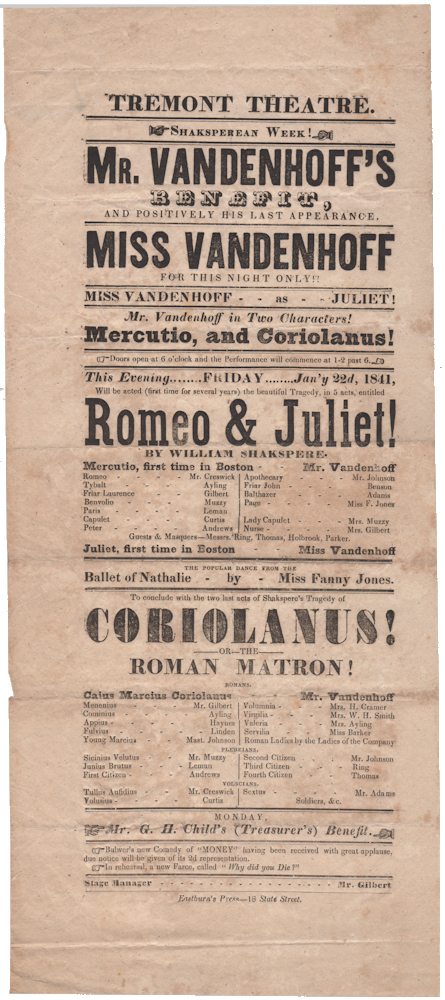
23 January 1841 in Boston

In 1852, she was chosen to be in John Tallis's "Shakespeare Gallery" in a painting titled Miss Vandenhoff as Juliet (with a quote from Act 3, scene ii). Engravings were made and potters in Stoke made figurines of her.

In 1839 she went to America where she acted in New York. Her father had acted in New York two years before. She played the role of Julia in a production called The Hunchback at the National Theatre. She went on to the Chestnut Street Theatre in Philadelphia where she created the same role.

In January 1841 she and her father were still in America. They appeared at the Tremont Theatre in Boston in a benefit for her father. Charlotte again played Juliette and her father in his "very last role" in America. Her father played Mercutio in the same play and on the same night the title role in Coriolanus.

In 1845 she and her father appeared at Covent Garden in Sophocles. Her father played Creon and she played, in what some thought her "great triumph", "Antigone".

On 7 July 1856 she married another actor Thomas Swinbourne at St Mary's Church in Hull. Almost immediately she tried to undo the marriage. The following year she joined her father as he went to Edinburgh where he played Wolsey in Henry VIII with Henry Irving in the role of "Surrey".

Having taken ill in Birmingham, Vandenhoff died in 1860 in Handsworth, Staffordshire. Her father died in the following year.
