= Edwin Forrest =

American actor (1806–1872)

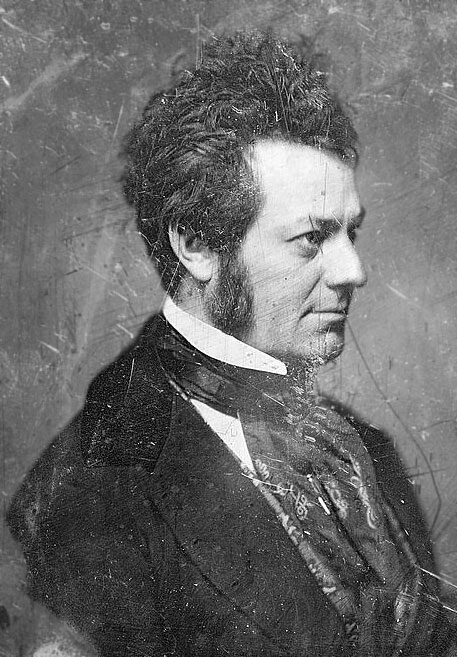
- Daguerreotype of Forrest by Mathew Brady
- Born: March 9, 1806; Philadelphia, Pennsylvania, U.S.
- Died: December 12, 1872 (aged 66); Philadelphia, Pennsylvania, U.S.
- Occupation: Actor
- Spouse: Catherine Norton Sinclair (m. 1837; div. 1852)

Signature
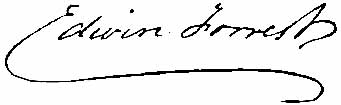

Edwin Forrest (March 9, 1806 – December 12, 1872) was a nineteenth-century American Shakespearean actor. His feud with the British actor William Macready was the cause of the deadly Astor Place Riot of 1849.

== Early life ==
Forrest was born in Philadelphia, Pennsylvania, the son of Rebecca (née Lauman) and William Forrest. His father, a Scottish merchandise peddler, moved from Dumfriesshire to Trenton, New Jersey in 1791. His mother was a member of an affluent German-American family. A business setback led William to relocate to Philadelphia, where he married Rebecca and was able to secure a position with a local branch of the United States Bank. As boys, Forrest and his brother William joined a local juvenile thespian club and participated in theatrical performances staged in a sparsely decorated woodshed.

At the age of 11, Forrest made his first appearance on the legitimate stage at Philadelphia's South Street Theatre, playing the female role Rosalia de Borgia in the John D. Turnbull melodrama Rudolph: or, The Robbers of Calabria. After Forrest's father died in 1819, he attempted to apprentice with a printer, a cooper, and finally a ship chandler. When attending a lecture in early 1820, he volunteered to participate in an experiment on the effects of nitrous oxide. While under the influence of the gas, he broke into a soliloquy from Shakespeare's Richard III that impressed eminent Philadelphia lawyer John Swift so much that Swift arranged an audition at the Walnut Street Theatre; this led to Forrest's formal stage debut on November 27, 1820, as Young Norval in John Home's Douglas.

== Early acting career ==
The theatres of New York and Philadelphia were already crowded with trained and successful actors, mostly the offspring of well-known British theatrical families or at least with British training. Few American actors were able to make much headway in these theaters, whose managers were highly skeptical of the quality of local talent.

Forrest therefore accepted an offer from Joshua Collins and William Jones, who owned theatres in Pittsburgh, Cincinnati and Lexington, and were scouting Philadelphia for actors who were willing to face the rigors of performing in the new cities along the Ohio and Mississippi River valleys. His tour through a rough country—with the inconveniences of long distances, the necessity of presenting his plays in rude halls, insufficient support, and poor scenery—was not altogether successful, but the discipline to mind and body was felt in all his subsequent career.

In 1824 he travelled from Louisville down to New Orleans, where he had been invited to join the company of the American Theatre, under the management of William Caldwell. There he began to act in a higher quality of production - though usually in roles secondary to Caldwell - and began to attract favorable responses from New Orleans audiences. However, Forrest vied with his employer for the affections of the leading actress of the company, Jane Placide. In a fury of jealousy, he quit the company and spent two months living in the Louisiana wilderness. Later Forrest would claim he spent much of this time in the company of a Choctaw Indian chief named Push-ma-ta-ha, though recent scholarship has come to question much of his account. By 1825 he was back in Philadelphia, and then went north to act with the Pearl Street Theatre in Albany, New York, where he was able to act with, and learn from, such eminent actors as William Conway and Edmund Kean.

== New York success ==
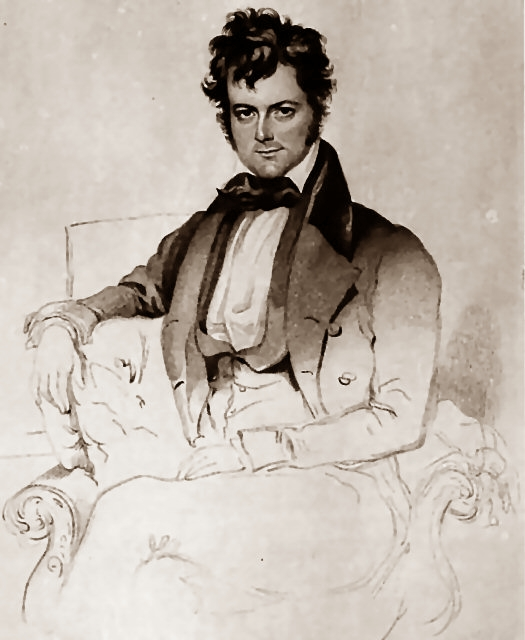
Forrest at 21

In 1826, he had a great success at the Bowery Theatre in New York City as Othello. The management employed him at a salary far below his worth, and he was at once offered increased payment at another theatre; but he refused to break his word, and carried out the contract to his own detriment. This strict sense of honor was characteristic of him throughout his career.

His New York success was repeated in every city he visited. British writer Thomas Hamilton marveled at, and dissented from, the acclaim that Forrest enjoyed at that time:

He is a coarse and vulgar actor, without grace, without dignity, with little flexibility of feature, and utterly common-place in his conceptions of character. There is certainly some energy about him, but this is sadly given to degenerate into rant. The audience, however, were enraptured. Every increase of voice in the actor was followed by louder thunders from box, pit, and gallery, till it sometimes became matter of serious calculation, how much longer one's tympanum could stand the crash.

In 1829 Forrest was featured as Metamora in the play Metamora; or, The Last of the Wampanoags by John Augustus Stone. After a few years of profitable labor, during which he had encouraged native talent by liberal offers for new American plays, he went to Europe for rest and travel and larger observation, and was received with much courtesy by actors and scholars.

He returned to Philadelphia in 1831, and played there and in New York and elsewhere with triumphant success until September 1836, when he sailed for England, this time professionally, and made his first appearance at Drury Lane as Spartacus in The Gladiator in 1836. The play was not a success, although his own role was noted favorably. During a season of ten months he performed in that historic theatre the parts of Macbeth, Othello, and King Lear. His social triumphs were as great as were his professional; he was entertained by William Macready and Charles Kemble, and at the end of the season was complimented by a dinner at the Garrick Club, presided over by Thomas Talfourd.

During this engagement he married, in June 1837, Miss Catherine Norton Sinclair, daughter of John Sinclair, a popular English singer. He returned to Philadelphia in November of the same year and began an engagement. His wife made a deep impression wherever she was presented, and it was argued that domestic happiness would be the fitting crown of his public career. But these predictions were disappointed.

== Playwriting contest ==
Canting arms of Edwin Forrest

Edwin Forrest began a playwriting contest from 1828 to 1847. The only rule the plays had to follow was that the lead Character had to fit Forrest and the plays typically followed American themes. The first play to win the contest was Metamora by John Augustus Stone in 1828. The winner the following year was The Gladiator by Robert Montgomery Bird. Other winning titles include Richard Penn Smith's Caius Marcus; two other plays by Robert Montgomery Bird: Oralloosa and The Broker of Bogota; and Robert T. Conrad's Jack Cade. Forrest was now known as a great Shakespearean actor as well as a supporter of emerging American playwrights. However, though his contest did raise the general reputation of American playwrights, it did little to help get the winners' plays produced elsewhere. Metamora, The Gladiator, and Jack Cade so well suited Forrest's strengths as a performer, showing off his strong voice and well-developed physique, that they remained in Forrest's personal repertory for the rest of his career.

== Rivalry with Macready ==
Forrest visited London a second time in 1845, accompanied by his wife, who was welcomed in the intellectual circles of English and Scottish society. He acted at the Princess's Theatre in London. He met with great success in Virginius and other parts, but when he attempted to personate Macbeth, a character unsuited to his physique and style of acting, the performance was hissed by the audience. Forrest attributed the hissing to the professional jealousy and machinations of Macready, although that artist had been kind and helpful to him when he first came before London audiences.

A few weeks later, when Macready was playing Hamlet in Edinburgh, Forrest stood up in a private box and hissed the English actor. This act evoked reproaches from the British press and destroyed the respect in which he had been held by the public. A letter by Forrest printed in The Times aggravated the offence. The incident was fatal to his popularity in Britain. His jealousy of Macready resulted in the Astor Place riot in May 1849. The public feud had exacerbated rifts in New York City social and political life. An estimated 10,000 people filled the streets outside the theater where Macready was playing Macbeth, fighting running battles with authorities and vainly trying to set fire to the Astor Opera House. Dozens of rioters were killed, and around 250 civilians, policemen and soldiers were injured.

== Divorce ==
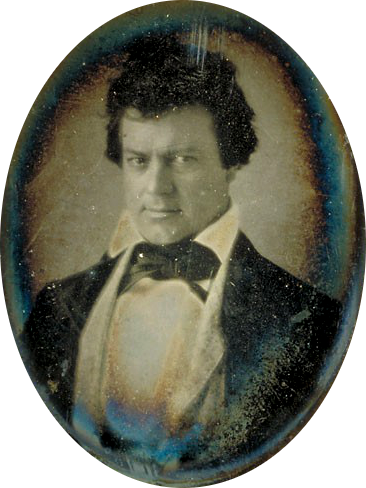
Early daguerreotype of Forrest

In 1850, Forrest and his wife sought divorce, after Forrest's affair with actress Josephine Clifton; he claimed that he had found a love letter to his wife from fellow actor George W. Jamieson. Forrest and Catherine separated in April 1849 and he moved to Philadelphia where he filed for divorce in February 1850, though the Pennsylvania legislature denied his divorce application. Under the advice of Parke Godwin, Catherine hired Charles O'Conor as her lawyer. The divorce became a cause célèbre and the well-known writer Nathaniel Parker Willis was caught in the middle. Willis defended Catherine, who maintained her innocence, in his magazine Home Journal and suggested that Forrest was merely jealous of her intellectual superiority. On June 17, 1850, shortly after Forrest had filed for divorce in the New York Supreme Court, Forrest beat Willis with a gutta-percha whip in New York's Washington Square, shouting "this man is the seducer of my wife". Willis, who was recovering from a rheumatic fever at the time, was unable to fight back. Willis's own wife soon received an anonymous letter suggesting that Willis was, in fact, involved with Forrest's wife. Willis later sued Forrest for assault and, by March 1852, was awarded $2,500 plus court costs. In the divorce case, Charles O'Conor was the counsel for Catherine, the defendant, with John Van Buren representing Edwin. Throughout the Forrest divorce case, which lasted six weeks, several witnesses made additional claims that Catherine Forrest and Nathaniel Parker Willis were having an affair, including a waiter who claimed he had seen the couple "lying on each other". As the press reported, "thousands and thousands of the anxious public" awaited the court's verdict; ultimately, the court sided with Catherine Forrest and Willis's name was cleared. O'Conor won a national reputation by winning the case, and secured a liberal alimony for Catherine. The whole affair hurt Forrest's reputation and soured his temper.

== Later stage career ==
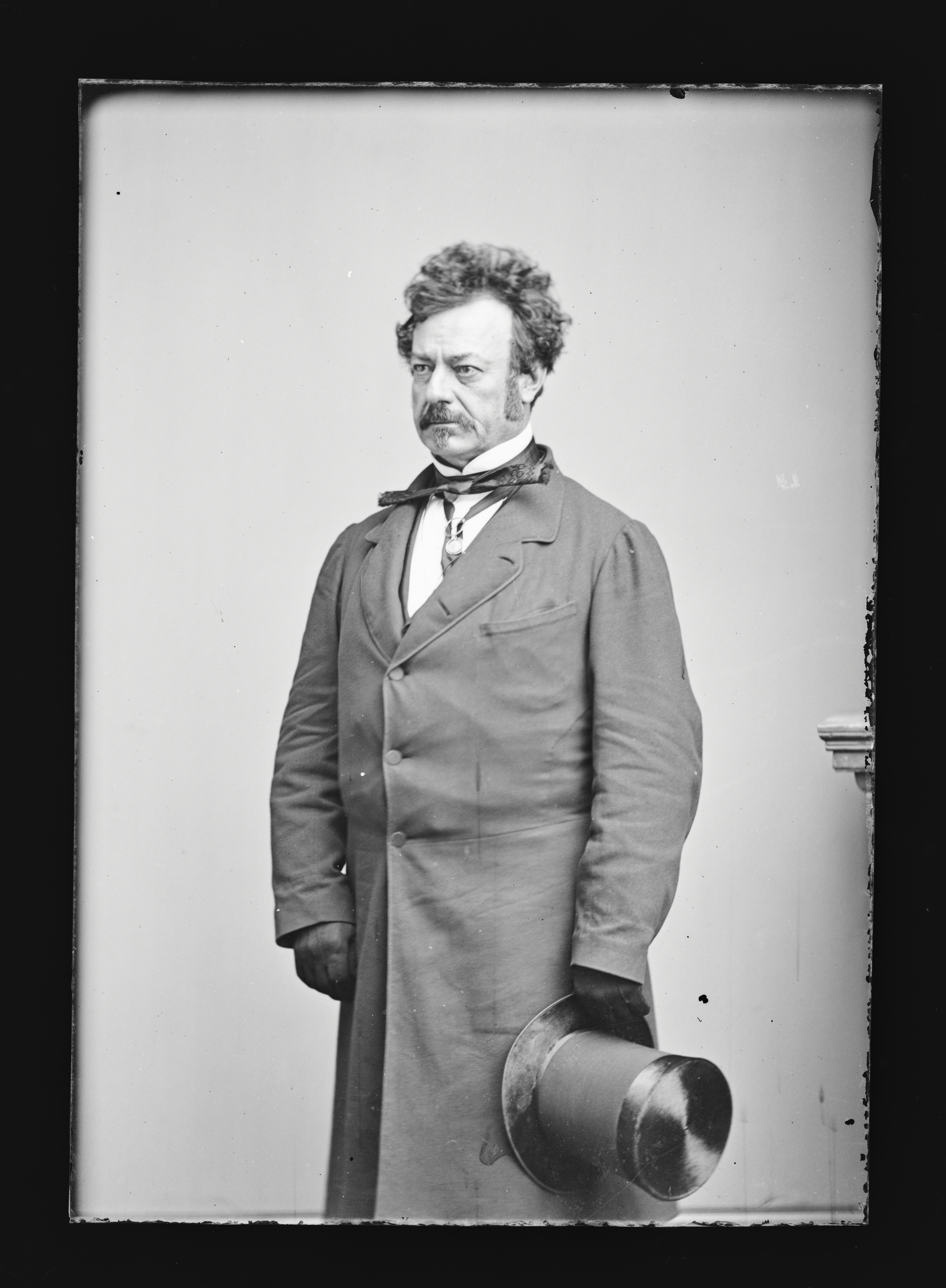
Forrest c. 1860-70

In 1853, he played Macbeth, with a strong cast and fine scenery, at the Broadway Theatre for four weeks—an unprecedented run at that date. He became interested in politics, being spoken of as a candidate for congress. In 1860, he appeared at Niblo's Garden, New York, as Hamlet, and played the most successful engagement of his life. Some news reports at that time said he had been retired from acting for several years, although there are also numerous newspapers accounts of his performances in different cities between 1853 and 1860. Hereditary gout developed itself in a malignant form in 1865, during an engagement at the Holliday Street Theatre in Baltimore, Maryland the sciatic nerve was paralyzed, and he never regained the use of his hand or his steady gait. His California tour in 1866 was a failure. He played his last New York engagement in February 1871, the plays being Richelieu and King Lear. The weather was cold, and the houses empty.

In October 1871, Forrest commenced his last annual tour, starting at the Walnut Theater in his home town of Philadelphia. He passed through Columbus, OH; Cincinnati, OH; New Orleans, LA; Galveston, TX; Nashville, TN; Kansas City, MO; Leavenworth, KS; St. Louis, MO; Pittsburgh, PA; Detroit, MI; Buffalo, NY; and by late February the Opera House in Rochester, NY; February 27 through March 1. From Rochester he traveled on to Boston, MA.

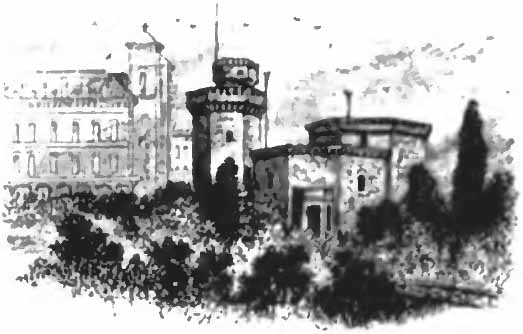
Forrest's castle-like mansion by the Hudson River in New York

On the night of March 25, 1872, he appeared in Boston, Massachusetts at the Globe Theatre, as Lear, played this part six times, and was announced for Richelieu and Virginius, but on the intervening Sunday he caught cold. He struggled through the role of Richelieu on Monday night, and rare bursts of eloquence lighted the gloom, but he labored piteously against the disease which was fast conquering him. Being offered stimulants, he signed them away, with the words, "If I die, I will still be my royal self." This was his last appearance as an actor. He eventually recovered from the severe attack of pneumonia. The craving for public applause, which was his only happiness, induced him to give readings from Shakespeare in several large cities. The scheme failed, and was abandoned, to his deep mortification.

A stroke of paralysis ended his life suddenly and without pain. His servant found him dead, alone, and apparently asleep, in his home in Philadelphia December 12, 1872. His body was interred in Old Saint Paul's Episcopal Church Cemetery, Philadelphia. The large sums that he had earned on the stage were judiciously and fortunately invested, and resulted in his amassing a large fortune. He had purchased, about 1850, a site on the banks of the Hudson, on which he erected a castellated structure. This estate, which he named Fonthill, he afterward sold at a large advance for a convent, which later became the College of Mount Saint Vincent. In 1855 he purchased his mansion in Philadelphia, to which he retired after his temporary abandonment of the stage. There he collected the largest dramatic library in the United States. By avoiding New York and by legal evasions he succeeded in escaping the payment of alimony to his wife, but left his estate heavily in her debt.

== Philanthropic efforts ==
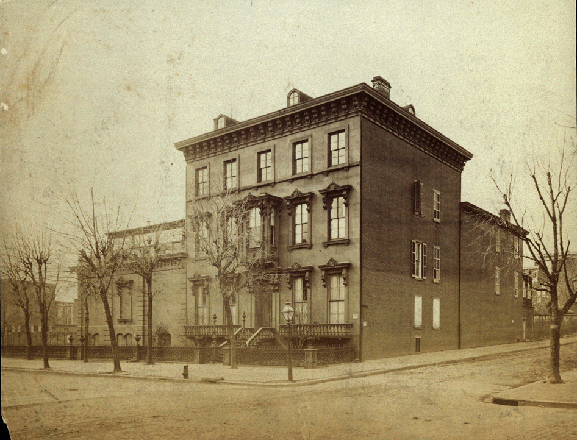
Edwin Forrest home in Philadelphia

His love of the theatre was unbounded, and he is one of the few whose memory survives to this day, for he used his considerable accumulated wealth to support his fellow actors.

This began in 1865, the year of Lincoln's assassination by the actor John Wilkes Booth, a time when the public held those in the acting profession in low regard, if not contempt. He sheltered actors at his Summer home near Philadelphia and, in 1876, four years after his death at the age of 66, his will instructed that there should be formed the Forrest Home for retired actors in Philadelphia, which was to last for over one hundred years before being folded into the much larger Actors Fund facility in Englewood, New Jersey. There his name lives on, in the Edwin Forrest Wing. His will also instructed that a two thousand dollars bequest be provided to Actors' Order of Friendship, whose New York City Lodge was named after him.

In the 1920s, architect Herbert J. Krapp was chosen to design two new theatres, one in New York City and the other in Philadelphia. Both were initially named the Forrest Theatre in honor of Forrest and his contributions to the theatre world. While the Philadelphia location is still called the Forrest Theatre, the building in New York has changed names over the years and is currently known as the Eugene O'Neill Theatre.

== See also ==
- Lawrence Barrett's Edwin Forrest (Boston, 1881)
- Edwin Forrest House
- Edwin Forrest School

== Bibliography ==
- Baker, Thomas N. (2001). Nathaniel Parker Willis and the Trials of Literary Fame. New York: Oxford University Press. ISBN 978-0-19-512073-8.
- Beers, Henry A. (1913). Nathaniel Parker Willis. Boston: Houghton Mifflin Company.
- Moody, Richard (1960). Edwin Forrest: First Star of the American Stage. New York: Alfred A. Knopf.
- Yellin, Jean Fagan (2004). Harriet Jacobs: A Life. Cambridge, Massachusetts: Basic Civitas Books. ISBN 978-0-465-09288-8.
