= John Vandenhoff =

English actor (1790–1861)

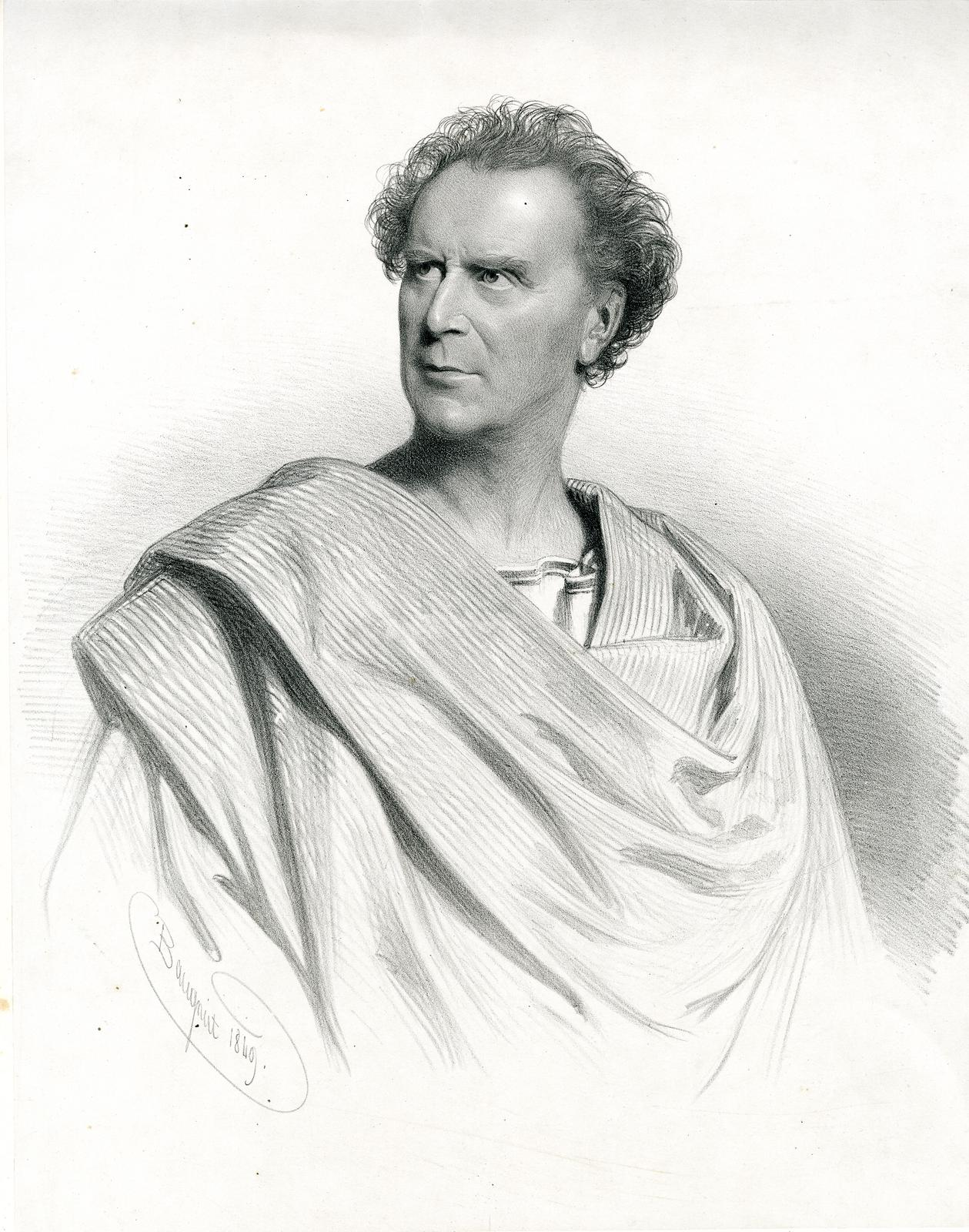
Lithograph by Charles Baugniet (1849)

John Michael Vandenhoff (31 March 1790 – 4 October 1861) was an English actor. He performed in London theatres, and also in Edinburgh and Liverpool; he played leading roles including those in Shakespearean tragedy.

== Life ==
Vandenhoff was born in 1790 in Salisbury, where his family, of Dutch extraction, coming over, it is said, in the train of William of Orange, appear to have been dyers. He was educated at Stonyhurst College, with a view to the priesthood. For a year he taught classics in a school.

=== Early career ===
His first appearance on the stage was at Salisbury in May 1808, as Osmond in The Castle Spectre. After playing at Exeter, Weymouth, and elsewhere, with Edmund Kean, and at Swansea with John Cooper, he made his first appearance at Bath in October 1813 as Jaffier in Venice Preserv'd. During the season 1813–1814 he played Alcanor in Mahomet, Freehold in The Country Lasses and King Henry in First Part of Henry IV. In 1814 he was a member of the company at the Lyceum Theatre, London under Samuel James Arnold. In the same year he made his first appearance in Liverpool, where he became a great favourite, playing also in Manchester, Dublin, and elsewhere.

=== Covent Garden, and return to Liverpool ===
In December 1820, as Vandenhoff from Liverpool, he made as Lear his first appearance at Covent Garden. He had got rid of an awkwardness that before had afflicted him, and made a good impression. During the season he was seen as Sir Giles Overreach in A New Way to Pay Old Debts, and in the title roles of Coriolanus, and Pizarro by Richard Brinsley Sheridan. He was also Leicester in Kenilworth in March. He retired in some disgust at the treatment he received from his manager, and his name does not appear the following season.

He returned to Liverpool, but the preference there for a local actor named Salter in place of Vandenhoff caused the "Salter riots", intended to drive Vandenhoff away. The theatre management eventually engaged both actors, and they appeared alternately, until it was acknowledged that Vandenhoff was the better actor.

=== In Edinburgh, London and America ===
In January 1823 he appeared in Edinburgh as Coriolanus, returning in January 1826 as Macbeth, and again in February 1830, when he played Cassius in Julius Caesar, and Othello. He was a favourite in Edinburgh, where his Coriolanus inspired great enthusiasm. He appears to have played there many consecutive years between January and March.

In 1834 he was seen at the Haymarket in Hamlet. In 1835–1836 he played at both Drury Lane and Covent Garden, alternate nights being given to opera. On the transference of Thomas Talfourd's Ion from Covent Garden to the Haymarket in August 1836, he played Adrastus: on the whole, according to William Macready, a "very tiresome" performance. Among his original characters were Eleazer in The Jewess in the season of 1835–1836, Louis XIV in Edward Bulwer-Lytton's The Duchess de la Vallière (Covent Garden, January 1837), and Pym in Robert Browning's Strafford in May. Of his performance in the character last named, John Forster in The Examiner said that "he was positively nauseous with his whining, drawling, and slouching". The same critic said, however, of Vandenhoff's Creon in Antigone that it was performed with "solid dignity and picturesque effect".

In September 1837 he went to America; he appeared at the National Theatre in New York, and, as Caius Marcus in Coriolanus, appeared at the Chestnut Street Theatre in Philadelphia.

On his return to England, he became in September 1838 a member of the company of Covent Garden when Macready opened the theatre as manager. After 1839, when Macready's management ended, Vandenhoff played chiefly in the provinces, although he was seen occasionally at Drury Lane.

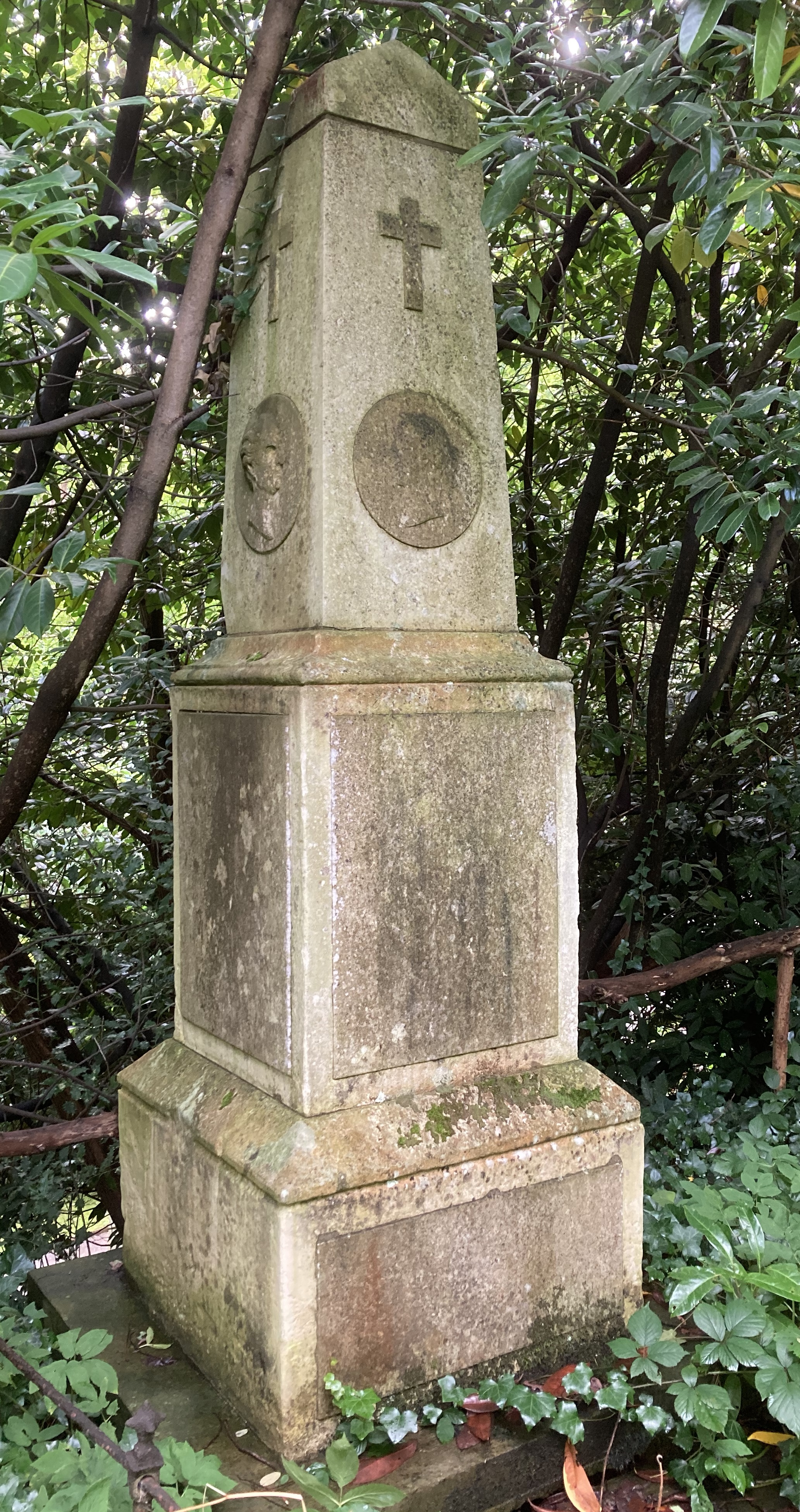
Grave of John Vandenhoff in Highgate Cemetery

=== Final appearances ===
In January 1857 Vandenhoff, with his daughter, paid a starring visit to Edinburgh, bidding it farewell on 26 February as Wolsey in Henry VIII, Henry Irving playing Surrey. On 29 October 1858, at Liverpool, he took farewell of the stage as Brutus and Wolsey. He died on 4 October 1861 at his home in North Bank, Regent's Park, London and is buried on the western side of Highgate Cemetery (plot no.10494).

== Family ==
In 1810 in Barnstaple he married Elizabeth Pike; they had several children, of whom Charlotte Vandenhoff and George Vandenhoff became actors.

== Critics' opinions ==
Upon Vandenhoff's first appearance in London, The New Monthly Magazine described him as "possessor of a tall figure, intelligent but not strongly marked features, and a voice sufficiently powerful but rather of a coarse quality". His Overreach was said to be pitched in too low a key, but to display judgement. The Literary Gazette "damns with faint praise" his Richard III. John Westland Marston credits him with great dignity, and with thinking out happily his characters, praising highly his Coriolanus and Creon, but speaking of his Othello and Macbeth as deficient in pathos and passion. His Iago is said to have had a mask of impulsive light-heartedness and bonhomie, and "a sort of detestable gaiety in his soliloquies and asides".
