= George Vandenhoff =

American actor

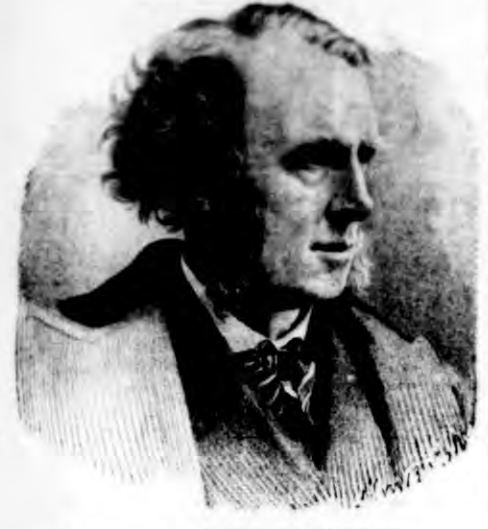
- Vandenhoff in 1873
- Born: 18 February 1820; England
- Died: 15 June 1885 (aged 65); England

George Vandenhoff (18 February 1820 - 15 June 1885) was an English actor and elocutionist who performed in Britain and the United States.

== Life ==
Vandenhoff was born in 1820 in England, a son of Elizabeth (born Pike) and English actor John Vandenhoff. His elder sister was the actress Charlotte Vandenhoff. He debuted in Rule a Wife and Have a Wife at the Covent Garden Theatre on 14 October 1839. He came to the United States in 1842, debuting in a performance as Hamlet, and appeared in productions in New York. In 1846, he gave the "Opening Address" at the new Howard Athenaeum in Boston.

Vandenhoff married American actress Mary E. Makeah in Boston in 1855. After leaving acting, he began practicing as a lawyer (in which profession he had previously been trained) by 1858.

He also authored books about performing and reading in public. Well known for his skills in public speaking, in 1869, Vandenhoff was lured by author Charles Reade to read a large portion of his 1866 novel Griffith Gaunt to the jury in a defamation trial.

He died in Brighton, England, in June 1885.

== Selected works ==
- The Clay Code, or Text-Book of Eloquence (1844)
- A Plain System of Elocution (1845)
- Dramatic Reminiscences, or Actors and Actresses in England and America (1860)
- Leaves from an Actor's Note-Book (1860)
- The Clerical Assistant, or Elocutionary Guide (1862)
- A Lady's Reader, with Rules for Reading Aloud (1862)
- The art of elocution (1862)
- The art of reading aloud (1878)
