= Lanista =

Scientific classification
- Kingdom: Animalia
- Phylum: Arthropoda
- Clade: Pancrustacea
- Class: Insecta
- Order: Orthoptera
- Suborder: Ensifera
- Family: Tettigoniidae
- Tribe: Copiphorini
- Genus: Lanista; Bolívar, 1890

Genus of cricket-like animals

Lanista is a genus of African bush crickets (Orthoptera: Tettigoniidae) in the subfamily Conocephalinae.

== Species ==
- Lanista affinis Bolívar, 1906
- Lanista annulicornis (Walker, 1869)
- Lanista crassicollis Bolívar, 1906
- Lanista varelai Bolívar, 1906
