= Tremont Theatre (Bronx) =

Former theater in the Bronx, New York

Coordinates: 40.849°N 73.899°W

- Interactive map of Tremont Theatre
- Former names: Tremont Yiddish Theatre; Cinema Tremont; Moss's Tremont Avenue; Hamilton Theater
- Address: The Bronx, New York City; United States
- Location: Webster Avenue and East 178th Street
- Capacity: 942 seats
- Type: Movie theater

Construction
- Built: Around 1910
- Closed: Around 1960

Tremont Theatre was a theater constructed in about 1910 with seating for 942. It was located on Webster Avenue and East 178th Street, beside a New York Telephone Company building. One of the earliest purpose-built cinemas, it was known by various names during its use including Tremont Yiddish Theatre, Cinema Tremont, Moss's Tremont Avenue, and the Hamilton Theater. The theater closed around 1960.

Organ Specifications: It had a II/7 "Style 3" Wurlitzer, Op. 9 in 1912 and an M. P. Moller pipe organ, Opus 2952, 3 Manual/17 Rank installed in 1921 at a cost of $8,000.
